= Johnny Gill discography =

Artist discography

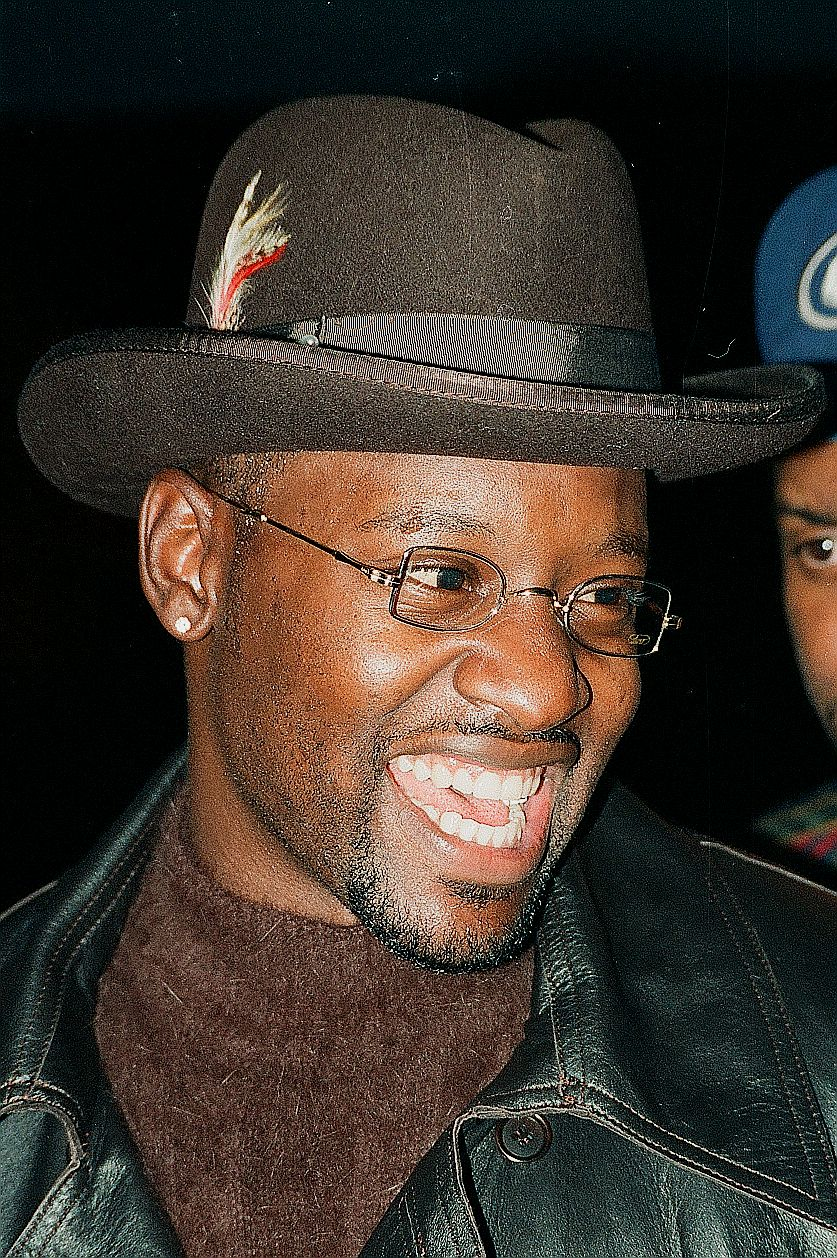
- Gill in 1998
- Studio albums: 8
- Compilation albums: 3
- Singles: 37
- Collaboration albums: 1

The discography of Johnny Gill, an American R&B singer, consists of eight solo studio albums, thirty-seven singles, and three official compilation albums. In addition to solo albums, he has recorded one duet album with Stacy Lattisaw, as well as three albums as a member of New Edition and two albums as a member of supergroup LSG. Gill is also a member of supergroup Heads of State, but the group has yet to release an album.

== Albums ==
=== Studio albums ===
List of studio albums, with selected details, peak chart positions and certifications
| Title | Album details | Peak chart positions | | | | | | | | Certifications |
| Title | Album details | US | US R&B | US Ind. | AUS | CAN | NED | NZ | UK | Certifications |
|---|---|---|---|---|---|---|---|---|---|---|
| Johnny Gill (1983 album) | Released: 1983; Label: Cotillion; Formats: LP, CD, cassette | — | 64 | — | — | — | — | — | — | |
| Chemistry | Released: 1985; Label: Cotillion; Formats: LP, CD | — | 51 | — | — | — | — | — | — | |
| Johnny Gill (1990 album) | Released: April 17, 1990; Label: Motown; Formats: LP, CD, cassette | 8 | 1 | — | 110 | 29 | 73 | 47 | — | RIAA: 2× Platinum; MC: Gold |
| Provocative | Released: June 8, 1993; Label: Motown; Formats: LP, CD, cassette | 14 | 4 | — | 31 | 36 | 64 | — | 42 | RIAA: Gold |
| Let's Get the Mood Right | Released: October 8, 1996; Label: Motown; Format: CD | 32 | 7 | — | 146 | — | — | — | — | RIAA: Gold |
| Still Winning | Released: October 11, 2011; Label: Notifi; Format: CD | 17 | 4 | 3 | — | — | — | — | — | |
| Game Changer | Released: December 9, 2014; Label: J Skillz, Caroline; Format: CD | 56 | 6 | 4 | — | — | — | — | — | |
| Game Changer II | Released: September 6, 2019; Label: J Skillz, Kavalry; Format: CD | — | — | 15 | — | — | — | — | — | |
"—" denotes a title that did not chart, or was not released in that territory.

=== Collaboration album ===
List of collaboration albums, with selected details and peak chart positions
| Title | Album details | Peak chart position | |
| Title | Album details | US | US R&B |
|---|---|---|---|
| Perfect Combination (with Stacy Lattisaw) | Released: February 1984; Label: Cotillion; Formats: LP, CD | 139 | 27 |

=== Compilation albums ===
List of compilation albums, with selected details
| Title | Album details |
|---|---|
| Favorites | Released: November 11, 1997; Label: Motown; Format: CD |
| Ultimate Collection | Released: March 26, 2002; Label: Hip-O; Format: CD |
| 20th Century Masters – The Millenium Collection: The Best of Johnny Gill | Released: June 17, 2003; Label: Motown; Format: CD |

== Singles ==
=== As lead artist ===
List of singles as lead artist, with selected peak chart positions
| Title | Year | Peak chart positions | | | | | | | Album |
| Title | Year | US | US R&B | US Dance | AUS | NED | NZ | UK | Album |
|---|---|---|---|---|---|---|---|---|---|
| "Super Love" | 1983 | — | 29 | — | — | — | — | — | Johnny Gill (1983 album) |
| "When Something Is Wrong with My Baby" | 1983 | — | 57 | — | — | — | — | — | Johnny Gill (1983 album) |
| "Perfect Combination" (with Stacy Lattisaw) | 1984 | 75 | 10 | — | — | — | — | — | Perfect Combination |
| "Heartbreak Look" (with Stacy Lattisaw) | 1984 | 75 | 10 | — | — | — | — | — | Perfect Combination |
| "Block Party" (with Stacy Lattisaw) | 1984 | — | — | 48 | — | — | — | — | Perfect Combination |
| "Baby It's You" (with Stacy Lattisaw) | 1984 | — | — | — | — | — | — | — | Perfect Combination |
| "Half Crazy" | 1984 | — | 26 | — | — | — | — | — | Chemistry |
| "Can't Wait Til Tomorrow" | 1985 | — | 49 | — | — | — | — | — | Chemistry |
| "Rub You the Right Way" (Note: "Rub You the Right Way" is Gill's only single to date to be certified gold.) | 1990 | 3 | 1 | 16 | 59 | 27 | 41 | 77 | Johnny Gill (1990 album) |
| "My, My, My" | 1990 | 10 | 1 | — | 122 | 37 | 31 | 89 | Johnny Gill (1990 album) |
| "Fairweather Friend" | 1990 | 28 | 2 | — | 142 | — | — | — | Johnny Gill (1990 album) |
| "Wrap My Body Tight" | 1991 | 84 | 1 | 48 | — | 47 | — | 57 | Johnny Gill (1990 album) |
| "Giving My All to You" | 1991 | — | — | — | — | — | — | — | Johnny Gill (1990 album) |
| "I'm Still Waiting" | 1991 | — | 27 | — | — | — | — | — | Music from the Motion Picture New Jack City |
| "Let's Just Run Away" | 1992 | — | — | — | — | — | — | — | Mo' Money: Original Motion Picture Soundtrack |
| "There U Go" | 1992 | — | — | — | — | — | — | — | Boomerang: Original Soundtrack Album |
| "The Floor" (Note: "The Floor" also peaked at #32 on the Billboard Rhythmic Top 40 chart.) | 1993 | 56 | 11 | — | 6 | 45 | 29 | 53 | Provocative |
| "I Got You" | 1993 | — | 35 | — | — | — | — | — | Provocative |
| "Long Way from Home" | 1993 | — | 42 | — | — | — | — | — | Provocative |
| "A Cute, Sweet, Love Addiction" | 1993 | — | — | — | 89 | — | — | 46 | Provocative |
| "Quiet Time to Play" | 1994 | — | 25 | — | — | — | — | — | Provocative |
| "Tell Me How U Want It" | 1994 | — | — | — | — | — | — | — | Provocative |
| "Let's Get the Mood Right" | 1996 | 53 | 17 | — | 155 | — | — | — | Let's Get the Mood Right |
| "It's Your Body" | 1996 | 43 | 19 | — | — | — | — | — | Let's Get the Mood Right |
| "Maybe" | 1996 | — | — | — | — | — | — | — | Let's Get the Mood Right |
| "Having Illusions" | 1996 | — | — | — | — | — | — | — | Let's Get the Mood Right |
| "Love in an Elevator" | 1997 | — | 59 | — | — | — | — | — | Let's Get the Mood Right |
| "In the Mood" | 2011 | — | 33 | — | — | — | — | — | Still Winning |
| "It Would Be You" | 2012 | — | 60 | — | — | — | — | — | Still Winning |
| "Just the Way You Are" | 2012 | — | 78 | — | — | — | — | — | Still Winning |
| "Behind Closed Doors" | 2014 | — | — | — | — | — | — | — | Game Changer |
| "Game Changer" | 2015 | — | — | — | — | — | — | — | Game Changer |
| "This One's for Me and You" (featuring New Edition) | 2015 | — | — | — | — | — | — | — | Game Changer |
| "5000 Miles" (featuring Jaheim) | 2017 | — | — | — | — | — | — | — | Game Changer |
| "What Is This" | 2017 | — | — | — | — | — | — | — | Game Changer |
| "Soul of a Woman" | 2019 | — | — | — | — | — | — | — | Game Changer 2 |
| "Perfect" (featuring Ralph Tresvant) | 2019 | — | — | — | — | — | — | — | Game Changer 2 |
"—" denotes a title that did not chart, or was not released in that territory.

=== As featured artist ===
List of singles as featured artist, with selected peak chart positions
| Title | Year | Peak chart positions | | | | Album |
| Title | Year | US | US R&B | US Dance | UK | Album |
|---|---|---|---|---|---|---|
| "Where Do We Go from Here" (Stacy Lattisaw featuring Johnny Gill) | 1989 | — | 1 | 20 | — | What You Need (Stacy Lattisaw album) |
| "Word to the Mutha!" (Note: "Word to the Mutha!" peaked at number 37 on the Billboard Hot 100 Airplay chart and at number 11 on the New Zealand RIANZ chart.) (Bell Biv DeVoe featuring Bobby Brown, Ralph Tresvant and Johnny Gill) | 1991 | — | — | — | — | WBBD-Bootcity!: The Remix Album (Bell Biv DeVoe album) |
| "Silent Prayer" (Shanice featuring Johnny Gill) | 1992 | 31 | 4 | — | — | Inner Child (Shanice album) |
| "Slow and Sexy" (Note: "Slow and Sexy" also peaked at number 36 on the Billboard Rhythmic Top 40 chart.) (Shabba Ranks featuring Johnny Gill) | 1992 | 33 | 4 | 4 | 17 | X-tra Naked (Shabba Ranks album) |
"—" denotes a title that did not chart, or was not released in that territory.

== Music videos ==
List of music videos
| Title | Year | Director |
|---|---|---|
| "Half Crazy" | 1985 | |
| "Rub You the Right Way" | 1990 | |
| "My, My, My" | 1990 | Richard Friedman |
| "Wrap Your Body Tight" | 1990 | |
| "Fairweather Friend" | 1990 | |
| "I'm Still Waiting" | 1991 | |
| "The Floor" | 1993 | Julien Temple |
| "I Got You" | 1993 | Sanji |
| "Let's Get the Mood Right" | 1996 | Joseph Kahn |
| "It's Your Body" | 1996 | Paul Hunter |
| "Love in an Elevator" | 1997 | Johnny Gill; Jonathan Jardine |
| "In the Mood" | 2011 | |
| "Behind Closed Doors" | 2014 | Matt Alonzo |
| "This One's for Me and You" | 2015 | |
