= The Blues (Tony! Toni! Toné! song) =

Single by Tony! Toni! Toné!

from the album The Revival
- Released: March 29, 1990
- Recorded: 1989
- Genre: R&B
- Length: 4:13
- Label: Wing
- Songwriters: D'Wayne Wiggins, Timothy Christian Riley
- Producer: Tony! Toni! Toné!

Tony! Toni! Toné! singles chronology
"For the Love of You" (1989)	"The Blues" (1990)	"Feels Good" (1990)

"The Blues" is a number-one R&B single by the band Tony! Toni! Toné!. The song spent one week at number one on the U.S. R&B singles chart and peaked at number 46 on the Billboard Hot 100 in 1990. The single also peaked at number 43 on the Hot Dance Club Play chart, and number 92 on the UK Singles Chart.

== See also ==
- List of Hot R&B Singles number ones of 1990
