= Love on a Two-Way Street =

1968 soul ballad written by Sylvia Robinson and Bert Keyes

Single by the Moments

from the album Not on the Outside, But on the Inside, Strong!
- B-side: "I Won't Do Anything"
- Released: March 1970
- Genre: R&B, soul
- Length: 3:05 (single edit); 3:46 (album version)
- Label: Stang Records; All Platinum
- Songwriters: Sylvia Robinson; Bert Keyes
- Producer: Sylvia Robinson

The Moments singles chronology
"I Do" (1969)	"Love on a Two-Way Street" (1970)	"If I Didn't Care" (1970)

"Love on a Two-Way Street" is a soul ballad written by Sylvia Robinson and Bert Keyes in 1968. The song was originally recorded by Lezli Valentine, an artist signed to All Platinum, the record label that Sylvia Robinson co-owned with her husband, Joe. The song was then recorded by the Moments, an R&B vocal group signed to All Platinum subsidiary Stang Records, as filler for their 1968 album Not on the Outside, But on the Inside, Strong!. Sylvia and Joe decided to release the song as a single in March 1970 and it went on to become one of the biggest R&B hits of that year, spending five weeks at number 1 on Billboard's Soul Singles chart and reaching number 3 on the Hot 100 chart. Billboard ranked the record as the No. 25 song of 1970. It was also certified Gold by the RIAA for sales of one million copies.

== Musical composition ==
Willie and The Mighty Magnificents provided most of the musical backing on the song and Bert Keyes created the string arrangement that was overdubbed onto the track while also playing piano on the recording session.

According to the song's original vocalist, Lezli Valentine, she was a third contributor to the song, writing most of the song's lyrics:

Sylvia came into the office on the morning Two Way Street was created and said that she had a dream but that the only thing she remembered was "Love on a Two-way Street, Lost on a lonely Highway."--We went into Bert's office . . . Sylvia asked Bert to play what he felt (that became the melody) . . . I, Lezli Valentine, began to write the story line . . . "True love will never die, so I've been told but now I must cry, it is finally goodbye, I know . . . With music softly playing his lips were gently saying honey I love you". . .Sylvia wrote "he held me in desperation, I thought it was a revelation and then he walked out". . . I, Lezli Valentine wrote . . ."how could I be so blind to give of love the very first time, to be fooled is a hurting thing". . . Sylvia wrote "to be loved and fooled is a crying shame". . .Lezli Valentine wrote "while I bear the blame, as he laughs my name", the rest was completed, I recorded it; the lead sheets were hand delivered by one of the original Moments, John, who lived in DC. The original application was altered without my knowledge (omitting Lezli Valentine's name as a lyric writer . . . there are three writers on I Found Love On A Two-Way Street) Joseph Robinson, Sr. definitely knew this, (Joseph R.Robinson, Sr. said he would rectify this, evidently he never did. Each time I telephoned him on this he said he would take care of it) as did Ebert Mahon . . . AKA Bert Keyes and several recording artists in the Soul Sound Studios at the time! This was nerve-racking and resulted in hospitalizations.

== Chart history ==
=== Weekly charts ===
Chart (1970)	Peak position
Canada RPM Top Singles	13
U.S Billboard Hot 100	3
U.S. Billboard R&B	1
U.S. Cash Box Top 100	8

=== Year-end charts ===
Chart (1970)	Rank
U.S. Billboard Hot 100	25
U.S. Billboard R&B	2
U.S. Cash Box	69

== Certifications ==
Region	Certification	Certified units/sales
United States (RIAA)	Gold	1,000,000^{^}
^{^} Shipments figures based on certification alone.

== Stacy Lattisaw version ==
"Love on a Two-Way Street"

Single by Stacy Lattisaw

from the album With You
- B-side: "Baby I Love You"
- Released: June 1981
- Recorded: 1981
- Genre: R&B; soul
- Length: 4:11
- Label: Cotillion
- Songwriters: Sylvia Robinson; Bert Keyes
- Producer: Narada Michael Walden

Stacy Lattisaw singles chronology
"Let Me Be Your Angel" (1980)	"Love on a Two-Way Street" (1981)	"Attack of the Name Game" (1982)

In 1981, 14-year-old artist Stacy Lattisaw covered "Love on a Two-Way Street." It was the lead single from her With You LP. The song peaked at number two R&B, and number 26 on the Hot 100. As well as number 19 on the US Adult Contemporary chart. This version also peaked at number 23 on the Cash Box Top 100 during August of that year. The song was her second U.S. Top 40 hit.

=== Charts ===
Chart (1981)	Peak position
Canada RPM Top Singles	39
U.S. Billboard Hot 100	26
U.S. Billboard R&B	2
U.S. Billboard Adult Contemporary	19
U.S. Cash Box Top 100	23

== Other cover versions ==
- American jazz guitarist Grant Green also covered the song for his 1971 album, Visions.
