= Whatever You Want (Tony! Toni! Toné! song) =

Single by Tony! Toni! Toné!

from the album The Revival
- B-side: "Feels Good"
- Released: February 13, 1991
- Recorded: 1989
- Genre: R&B
- Length: 4:51
- Label: Wing
- Songwriters: Carl Wheeler & D'wayne Wiggins
- Producer: Tony! Toni! Toné!

Tony! Toni! Toné! singles chronology
"It Never Rains (In Southern California)" (1990)	"Whatever You Want" (1991)	"House Party II (I Don't Know What You Come to Do)" (1991)

"Whatever You Want" is the title of a number-one R&B single written by Tony! Toni! Tone! member Dwayne Wiggins and also performed by the group. It was the fourth and final single released from their second album, The Revival. The song spent two weeks at number one on the US R&B chart and peaked at number forty-eight on the Billboard Hot 100. It is their first single that did not feature Raphael on lead vocals.

The song was sampled in a number of songs including Kelly Price's "Soul of a Woman", in the remix of Ludacris's "Splash Waterfalls" with Raphael Saadiq and Sandy Coffee, in "Luven' Me" by rapper Nelly, in "OTW" by DJ Luke Nasty, and in "Whatever You Need" by Meek Mill.

== Track listings ==
7-inch single

1. "Whatever You Want" (7" Edit) – 4:10
2. "Whatever You Want" (Instrumental) – 4:51

Cassette single

1. "Whatever You Want" (7" Edit) – 4:10
2. "Whatever You Want" (Instrumental) – 4:51
3. "Feels Good" (Excerpt) – 0:45
4. "Don't Talk About Me" (Excerpt) – 0:45
5. "Let's Have a Good Time" (Excerpt) – 0:45

12-inch maxi-single

1. "Whatever You Want" (7" Edit) – 4:10
2. "Whatever You Want" (Instrumental) – 4:51
3. "Feels Good" (House Mix) – 6:59
4. "Feels Good" (Instrumental) – 5:20

== See also ==
- List of Hot R&B Singles number ones of 1991
