= List of Hot R&B Singles number ones of 1990 =

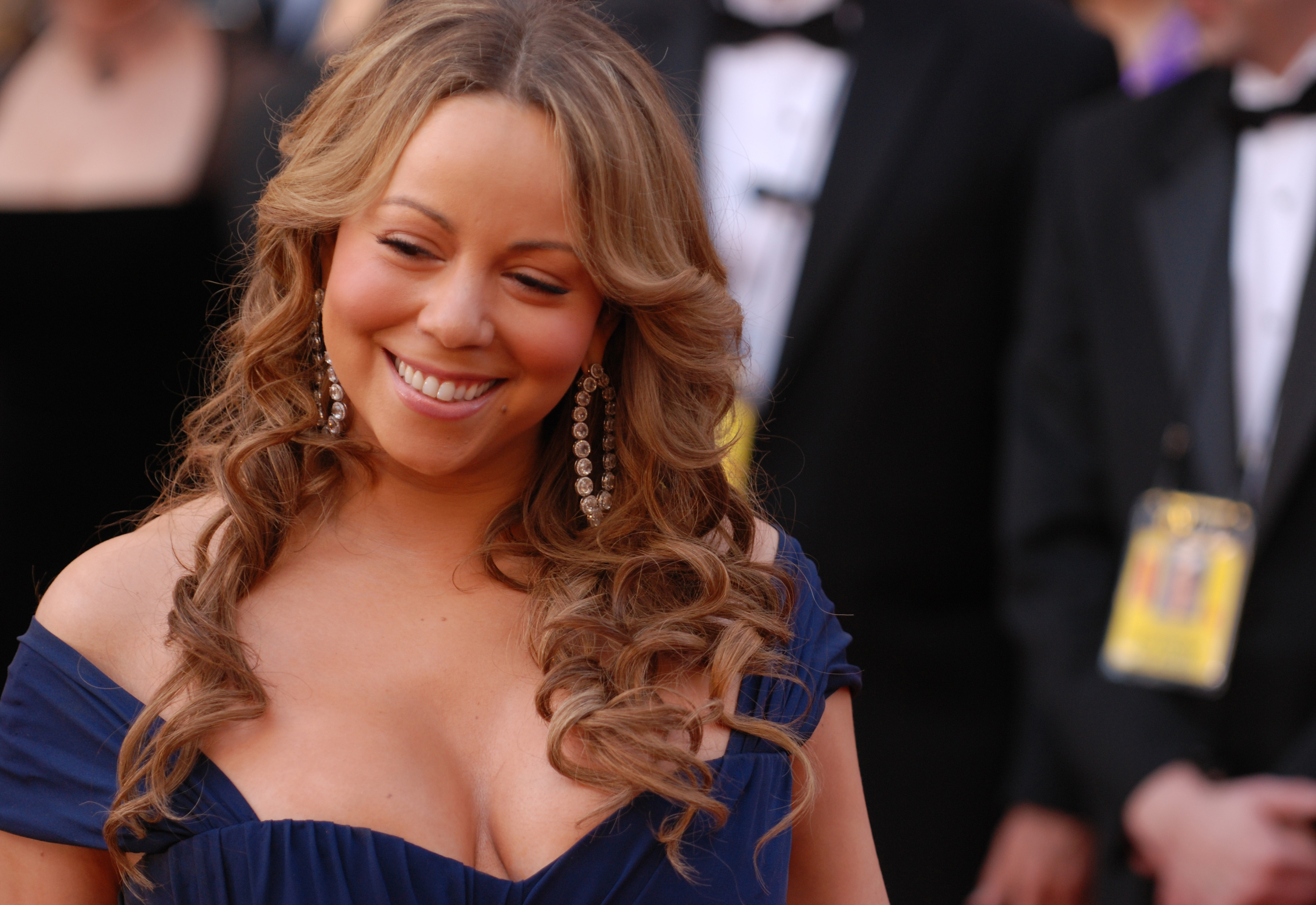
Mariah Carey (pictured in 2010) had her first chart-topper with "Vision of Love".

Billboard published a weekly chart in 1990 ranking the top-performing singles in the United States in African American–oriented genres; the chart's name has changed over the decades to reflect the evolution of black music and has been published as Hot R&B/Hip-Hop Songs since 2005. In 1990, the chart was published under the title Hot Black Singles through the issue of Billboard dated October 20 and Hot R&B Singles thereafter, and 36 different singles reached number one.

Among the acts who topped the chart for the first time was Mariah Carey, who reached number one in August with "Vision of Love", her first chart entry, and returned to the peak position in November with "Love Takes Time"; both also topped Billboard's pop chart, the Hot 100. Carey would go on to become one of the best-selling music artists of all time, with reported worldwide career sales of over 200 million by 2013, and set a new record for the most number ones on the Hot 100 by a solo artist. "Escapade" by Janet Jackson and "I'm Your Baby Tonight" by Whitney Houston also topped both the Black/R&B chart and the Hot 100 during 1990. Other acts to gain their first R&B chart-topper during the year included all five members of the most recent line-up of the group New Edition, which had recently split up: Johnny Gill made his first appearance in the peak position when he was featured on Stacy Lattisaw's song "Where Do We Go from Here" and achieved his first solo number one with "Rub You the Right Way", Ralph Tresvant spent a week atop the chart with "Sensitivity", and the remaining three members formed Bell Biv Devoe and reached number one for the first time with "Poison".

Eight acts topped the chart with two songs during 1990, and three achieved three number ones, including Gill, who had a third chart-topper in May with "My, My, My". The producer Quincy Jones reached number one with three singles from his album "Back on the Block": "I'll Be Good to You", "The Secret Garden (Sweet Seduction Suite)", and "Tomorrow (A Better You, A Better Me)". The first two featured guest vocals from various long-standing R&B stars and the last featured Tevin Campbell, who was 12 years old when the track was recorded. The group Tony! Toni! Toné! had three chart-toppers with "The Blues", "Feels Good", and "It Never Rains (In Southern California)", which was the last number one of the year. The group's total of five weeks at number one was the most by any act in 1990. The year's longest unbroken run in the peak position was three weeks, achieved by "Giving You the Benefit" by Pebbles.

== Chart history ==
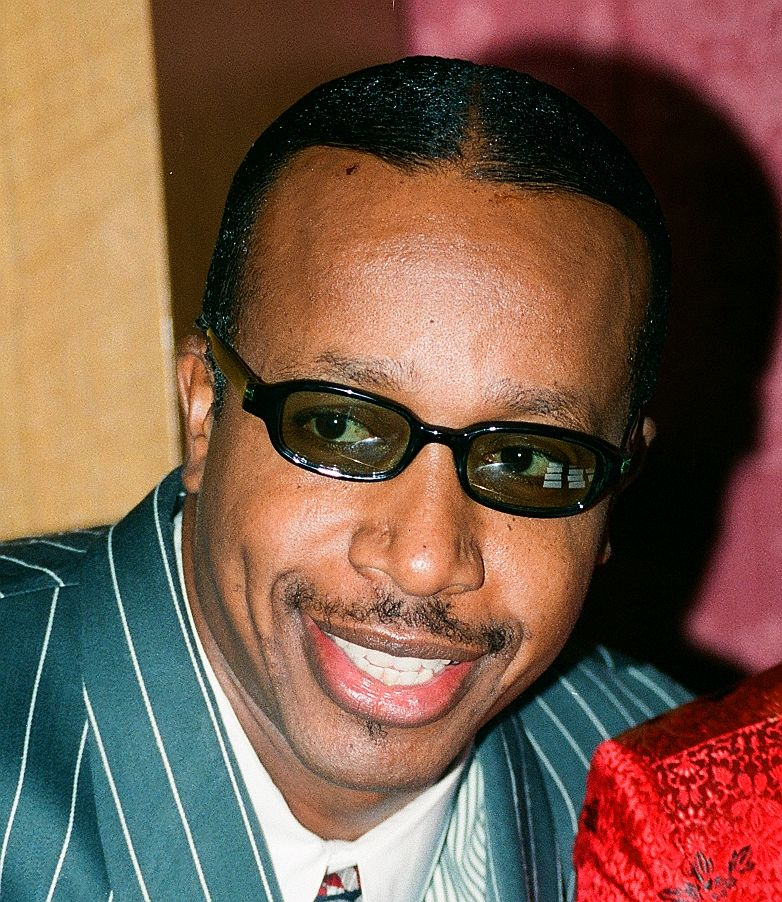
MC Hammer (pictured in 1999) topped the chart with "U Can't Touch This".

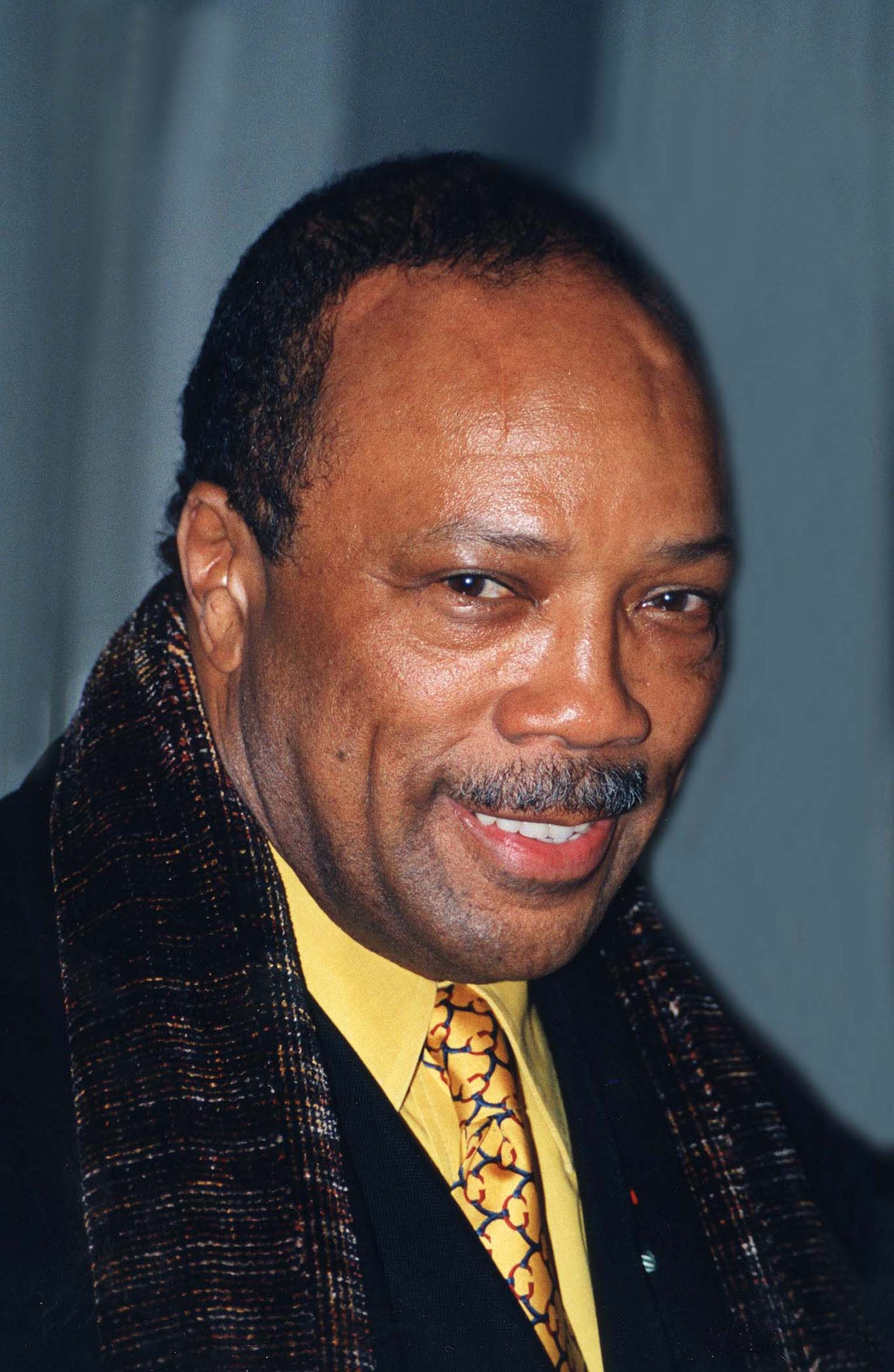
The producer Quincy Jones (pictured in 1997) had three number ones with various featured vocalists.

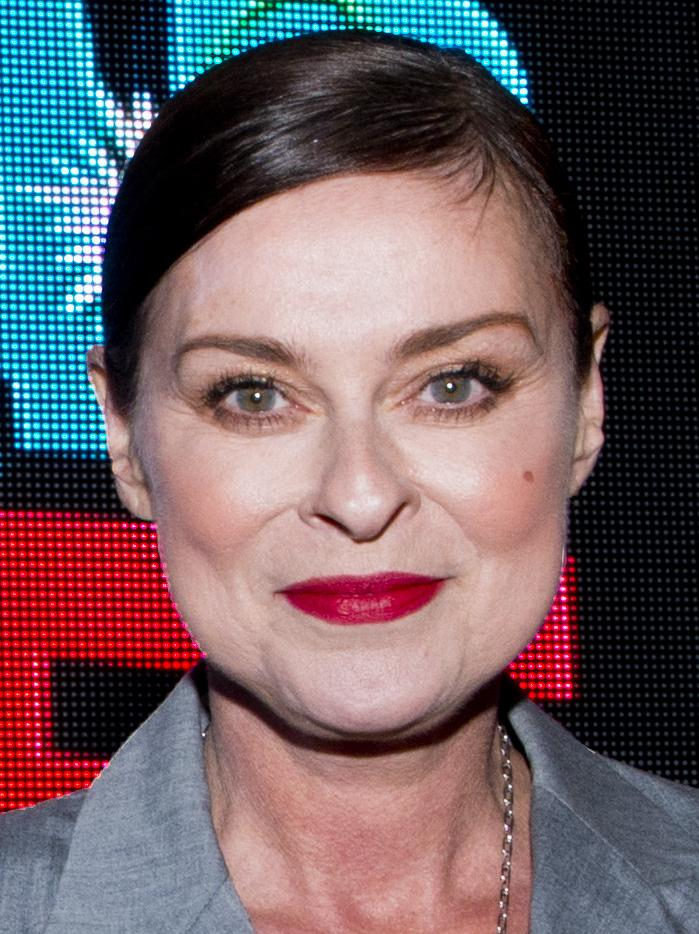
The British singer Lisa Stansfield (pictured in 2014) topped the chart for the first time in 1990.

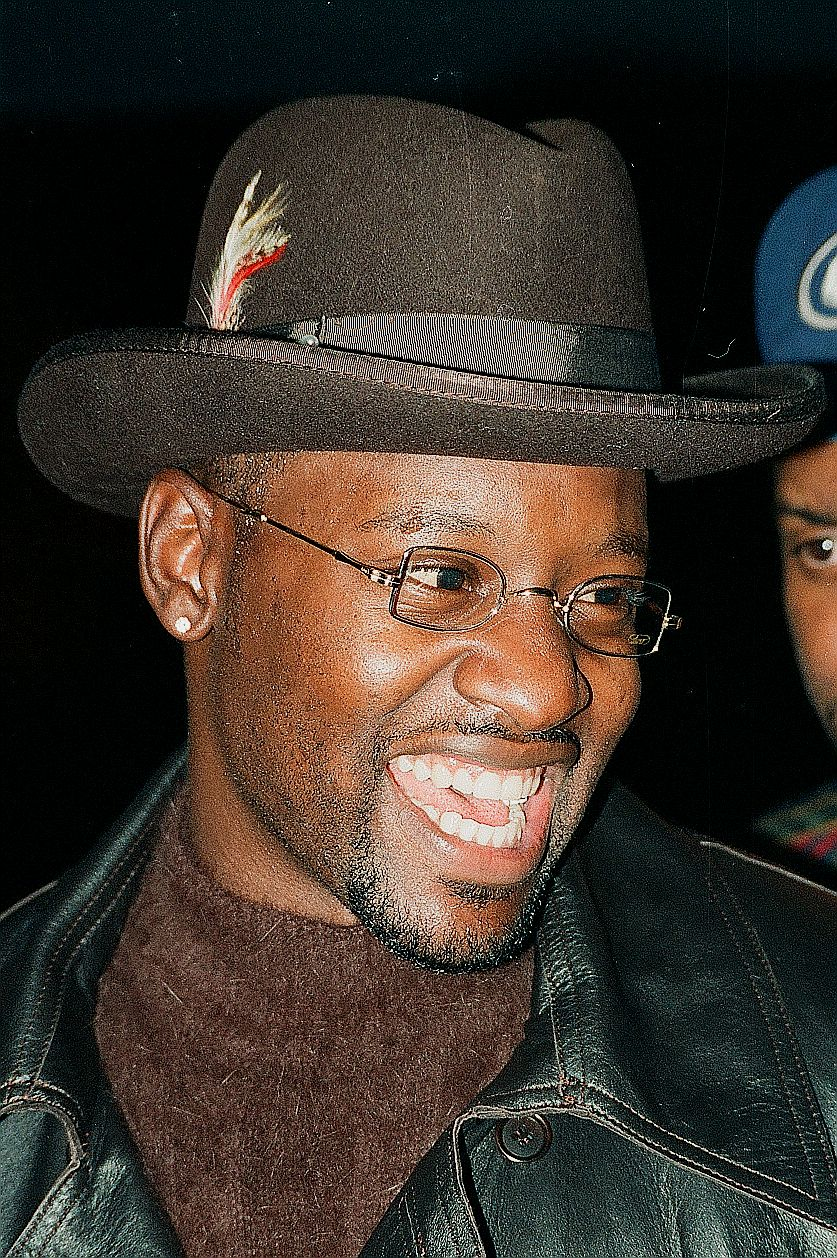
Johnny Gill (pictured in 1998) was one of five former members of the group New Edition to reach number one in 1990.

Key
†	Indicates number 1 on Billboard's year-end R&B singles chart

Chart history
Issue date	Title	Artist(s)	Ref.
January 6	"Tender Lover"	Babyface	
January 13	"Rhythm Nation"	Janet Jackson	
January 20	"I'll Be Good to You"	Quincy Jones featuring Ray Charles and Chaka Khan	
January 27	"I'll Be Good to You"	Quincy Jones featuring Ray Charles and Chaka Khan	
February 3	"Make It Like It Was"	Regina Belle	
February 10	"Real Love"	Skyy	
February 17	"It's Gonna Be Alright"	Ruby Turner	
February 24	"Where Do We Go from Here"	Stacy Lattisaw with Johnny Gill	
March 3	"Where Do We Go from Here"	Stacy Lattisaw with Johnny Gill	
March 10	"Escapade"	Janet Jackson	
March 17	"The Secret Garden (Sweet Seduction Suite)"	Quincy Jones with Al B. Sure!, James Ingram, El DeBarge and Barry White	
March 24	"All Around the World"	Lisa Stansfield	
March 31	"All Around the World"	Lisa Stansfield	
April 7	"Spread My Wings"	Troop	
April 14	"Spread My Wings"	Troop	
April 21	"Ready or Not"	After 7	
April 28	"Ready or Not"	After 7	
May 5	"Poison"	Bell Biv DeVoe	
May 12	"Poison"	Bell Biv DeVoe	
May 19	"Rub You the Right Way"	Johnny Gill	
May 26	"Hold On" †	En Vogue	
June 2	"Hold On" †	En Vogue	
June 9	"The Blues"	Tony! Toni! Toné!	
June 16	"Tomorrow (A Better You, A Better Me)"	Quincy Jones featuring Tevin Campbell	
June 23	"U Can't Touch This"	MC Hammer	
June 30	"All I Do Is Think of You"	Troop	
July 7	"You Can't Deny It"	Lisa Stansfield	
July 14	"My, My, My"	Johnny Gill	
July 21	"My, My, My"	Johnny Gill	
July 28	"Make You Sweat"	Keith Sweat	
August 4	"Can't Stop"	After 7	
August 11	"Vision of Love"	Mariah Carey	
August 18	"Vision of Love"	Mariah Carey	
August 25	"Jerk Out"	The Time	
September 1	"Feels Good"	Tony! Toni! Toné!	
September 8	"Feels Good"	Tony! Toni! Toné!	
September 15	"Lies"	En Vogue	
September 22	"Crazy"	The Boys	
September 29	"Thieves in the Temple"	Prince	
October 6	"Giving You the Benefit"	Pebbles	
October 13	"Giving You the Benefit"	Pebbles	
October 20	"Giving You the Benefit"	Pebbles	
October 27	"So You Like What You See"	Samuelle	
November 3	"So You Like What You See"	Samuelle	
November 10	"Love Takes Time"	Mariah Carey	
November 17	"B.B.D. (I Thought It Was Me)?"	Bell Biv DeVoe	
November 24	"Missunderstanding"	Al B. Sure!	
December 1	"I'm Your Baby Tonight"	Whitney Houston	
December 8	"I'm Your Baby Tonight"	Whitney Houston	
December 15	"Sensitivity"	Ralph Tresvant	
December 22	"It Never Rains (In Southern California)"	Tony! Toni! Toné!	
December 29	"It Never Rains (In Southern California)"	Tony! Toni! Toné!	

== See also ==
- 1990 in music
- List of Billboard number-one R&B albums of 1990
- List of Billboard Hot 100 number ones of 1990
