= With You (Stacy Lattisaw album) =

Studio album by Stacy Lattisaw
- Released: June 22, 1981
- Recorded: January–March 29, 1981
- Studio: RM 10 (Washington); The Automatt (San Francisco)
- Genre: R&B; soul; post-disco
- Length: 39:03
- Label: Cotillion
- Producer: Narada Michael Walden

Stacy Lattisaw chronology
Let Me Be Your Angel (1980)	With You (1981)	Sneakin' Out (1982)

Professional ratings
Review scores
Source	Rating
AllMusic	3/5 stars

With You is the third studio album by American singer Stacy Lattisaw. Released on June 22, 1981, by Cotillion Records, Lattisaw break-through single, a cover of the Moments's hit "Love on a Two-Way Street", peaked at number twenty-six on the U.S. pop chart and number two on the U.S. R&B chart in 1981.

== Track listing ==
1. "Feel My Love Tonight" – (Frank Martin, Narada Michael Walden, Randy Jackson, Allee Willis, Andre Knox, Charles Chapman, Wayne Wallace) 4:08
2. "Screamin' Off the Top" – (Walden, Jackson, Bunny Hull) – 4:27
3. "It Was So Easy" – (Julie Reeder, Billy Thomas, Bobby Reeder) – 3:15
4. "Baby I Love You" – (Walden, Jackson, Willis) – 4:34
5. "Love on a Two-Way Street" – (Bert Keyes, Sylvia Robinson) – 4:08
6. "With You" – (Walden, Jeff Cohen) – 4:46
7. "Young Girl" – (T. M. Stevens, Gavin Christopher, Lisa Walden, Walden) – 4:33
8. "Spotlight" – (Alan Glass, Preston Glass) – 4:45
9. "You Take Me to Heaven" – (Walden) – 4:09

== Charts ==
Chart (1981)	Peak position
Billboard 200	46
Billboard Top R&B Albums	8

=== Singles ===
Year	Single	Chart positions	
Year	Single	US Hot 100	US R&B
1981	"Love on a Two-Way Street"	26	2
1981	"It Was So Easy"	—	61
1981	"Feel My Love Tonight"	—	71
