= Who's Been Writing on the Wall Again =

Single by Jenny Bradley
- B-side: "Chubby"
- Released: June 1965
- Genre: Country pop
- Length: 2:15
- Label: Leedon
- Songwriter(s): Barry Gibb

"Who's Been Writing on the Wall Again" is a song written by Barry Gibb in 1965. It was first recorded by Jenny Bradley and was released in 1965 on Leedon Records.

Bradley was only 10 or 11 years old when the song was recorded. Like the Gibb brothers, she first appeared on the Australian television and then signed to Leedon. It was Bradley's third single. The B-side "Chubby" was also written by Barry himself.

Contrary to belief it was never recorded by the Bee Gees but was included in Assault the Vaults - Rare Australian Cover Versions Of The Brothers Gibb in 1998. It was also included on the Swan Songs - Rare Recordings Volume 1.

== Lori Balmer ==
"Who's Been Writing on the Wall Again"

Single by Lori Balmer
- B-side: "In Your World"
- Released: January 1967
- Recorded: St. Clair Studio and EMI Studios, Sydney in late 1966
- Genre: Country pop
- Length: 2:10
- Label: RCA
- Songwriter(s): Barry Gibb
- Producer(s): Ron Wills

Lori Balmer singles chronology
"Who's Been Writing on the Wall Again" (1967)	"Treacle Brown" (1968)

The song was later recorded by Lori Balmer with the Gibb brothers on backing vocals, Lori was only 8 years old when they recorded the song. Balmer recalls that she rehearsed the song with the Gibb brothers in St. Clair Studio but the recording was not done. Barry directed the session, and all Bee Gees can be heard singing on it, with no credit, likely for contractual reasons. That version produced by Ron Wills and was recorded in EMI Studios, Sydney, Balmer's version was released as a single at the start of 1967 while its flipside "In Your World" was also written by Barry.

It was Balmer's first single released on the RCA, the second was "Treacle Brown" which was written and produced by the Gibb brothers and only released in the United Kingdom on Polydor Records.
