= It Never Rains (In Southern California) =

Single by Tony! Toni! Toné!

from the album The Revival
- Released: October 19, 1990
- Recorded: 1989
- Genre: R&B
- Length: 4:56
- Label: Wing
- Songwriters: Timothy Riley; Raphael Saadiq
- Producer: Tony! Toni! Toné!

Tony! Toni! Toné! singles chronology
"Feels Good" (1990)	"It Never Rains (In Southern California)" (1990)	"Whatever You Want" (1991)

Music video
- "It Never Rains (In Southern California)" on YouTube

"It Never Rains (In Southern California)" is a song by American R&B group Tony! Toni! Toné!, released in October 1990 by Wing Records as the fourth single from their second album, The Revival (1990). The song is written by Timothy Riley and Raphael Saadiq and produced by the group. It peaked at number one on the US Billboard Hot R&B Singles chart for two weeks, and at number 34 on the Billboard Hot 100. The accompanying music video was directed by actress Lisa Bonet.

== Charts ==
Chart performance for "It Never Rains (In Southern California)"
Chart (1990–1991)	Peak position
UK Singles (OCC)	69
UK Dance (Music Week)	13
US Billboard Hot 100	34
US Hot R&B Singles (Billboard)	1

== See also ==
- List of Hot R&B Singles number ones of 1990
