= Sixteen (album) =

Studio album by Stacy Lattisaw
- Released: July 11, 1983
- Recorded: 1983
- Genre: Soul; R&B; pop
- Length: 32:19
- Label: Cotillion
- Producer: Narada Michael Walden

Stacy Lattisaw chronology
Sneakin' Out (1982)	Sixteen (1983)	Perfect Combination (1984)

Professional ratings
Review scores
Source	Rating
Allmusic	3/5 stars

Sixteen is the fifth studio album by American singer Stacy Lattisaw. Released on July 11, 1983, by Cotillion Records, Lattisaw was 16 years old at the time of this release. The single, "Miracles", peaked at number thirteen on the U.S. R&B chart in 1983.

== Track listing ==
1. "16" – 6:22
2. "Black Pumps and Pink Lipstick" – 4:48
3. "I've Loved You Somewhere Before" – 3:57
4. "Million Dollar Babe" – 5:15
5. "What's So Hot 'Bout Bad Boys" (featuring Kathy Sledge) – 6:25
6. "Johey!" – 5:17
7. "The Ways of Love" – 5:12
8. "Miracles" – 3:30

== Personnel ==
- Stacy Lattisaw – lead and backing vocals
- Narada Michael Walden – drums, keyboards, percussion, piano
- Randy Jackson – bass
- David Sancious – keyboards, synthesizer
- Corrado Rustici – guitar
- Preston Glass – percussion, backing vocals
- Marc Russo – saxophone
- Jim Gilstrap, Myrna Mathews, John Lehman, Angela Bofill, Carla Vaughn, Vicki Randle, Yolanda Glass – backing vocals

== Charts ==
Chart (1983)	Peak position
Billboard 200	160
Billboard Top R&B Albums	26

=== Singles ===
Year	Single	Chart positions	
Year	Single	US Hot 100	US R&B
1983	"Miracles"	40	13
1983	"Million Dollar Babe"	—	52
