= Young and in Love =

Young and In Love

Studio album by Stacy Lattisaw
- Released: June 13, 1979
- Recorded: 1979
- Studio: Mediasound, New York City
- Genre: Soul; disco; R&B
- Length: 31:43
- Label: Cotillion
- Producer: Van McCoy

Stacy Lattisaw chronology
Young and In Love (1979)	Let Me Be Your Angel (1980)

Professional ratings
Review scores
Source	Rating
Allmusic	2/5 stars

Young and In Love is the 1979 debut album by American singer Stacy Lattisaw. Released on June 13, 1979 by Cotillion Records (a subsidiary of Atlantic Records), Lattisaw was 12 years old at the time of this release. The lead single peaked at number 91 on the U.S. Soul charts. The album was produced by Van McCoy, one of his final projects before his death from a heart attack. Also, the title track is a cover of the hit 1964 song by Ruby & the Romantics.

== Track listing ==
All tracks composed and arranged by Van McCoy; except where indicated

1. "When You're Young and in Love" (Ballad Version) – 4:24
2. "Love Is Here Beside Us" (Charles Kipps) – 4:26
3. "Rock with Me" – 5:57
4. "Three Wishes" – 2:47
5. "Spinning Top" (Melvin Steals, Mervin Steals, Robert Ledbetter) – 3:41
6. "Dedicated to the One I Love" (Lowman Pauling, Ralph Bass) – 3:22
7. "Downtown" (Tony Hatch) – 3:36
8. "When You're Young and in Love" (Disco Version) – 3:30

== Personnel ==
- Stacy Lattisaw – vocals
- Bert Jones, Hiram Bullock – guitar
- Gordon Edwards – bass
- Van McCoy – keyboards
- Steve Jordan – drums
- Doug Allen, George Devens – percussion
- Albert Bailey, Brenda Hilliard, Diane Destry, Esther Marrow, J.J. Jackson, Richard Harris, Van McCoy, Zulema Cusseaux – backing vocals
- Gene Orloff – conductor

== Charts ==
=== Singles ===
Year	Single	US R&B
1979	"When You're Young and in Love"	91
