= Don't Throw It All Away =

Song written by Gary Benson

Single by Gary Benson
- B-side: "This House"
- Released: September 1975
- Genre: Soft rock
- Label: State
- Songwriters: Gary Benson; David Richard Mindell
- Producer: Steve Edgley

"Don't Throw It All Away" is a song written by British musician Gary Benson and first released by the Shadows on their 1975 album Specs Appeal. Benson released his version as a single later the same year, which reached number 20 on the UK Singles Chart in the fall of 1975.

== Charts ==
Chart (1975)	Peak position
UK Singles (OCC)	20

== Lori Balmer version ==
Australian pop singer Lori Balmer covered the song in 1976, reaching No. 66 in Australia.

=== Charts ===
Chart (1976)	Peak position
Australia (Kent Music Report)	66

== Dave & Sugar version ==
"Don't Throw It All Away"

Single by Dave & Sugar

from the album That's the Way Love Should Be
- B-side: "Queen of My Heart"
- Released: February 1977
- Recorded: November 1976
- Studio: RCA Victor Studio, Nashville, Tennessee
- Genre: Country
- Length: 3:09
- Label: RCA
- Songwriters: Gary Benson; David Mindell
- Producers: Jerry Bradley; Charley Pride

Dave & Sugar singles chronology
"I'm Gonna Love You" (1976)	"Don't Throw It All Away" (1977)	"That's the Way Love Should Be" (1977)

A country version by Dave & Sugar on their That's the Way Love Should Be LP, released in 1977, was the first of two American charting versions. Co-produced by Charley Pride, the song became the group's third U.S. top 10 hit, reaching number five on both the American and Canadian Country charts. It was also a top 40 hit on the Easy Listening charts of both nations.

=== Charts ===
Chart (1977)	Peak position
Canada RPM Adult Contemporary	34
Canada RPM Country Tracks	5
US Hot Country Songs (Billboard)	5
US Adult Contemporary (Billboard)	32

== Stacy Lattisaw version ==
"Don't Throw It All Away"

Single by Stacy Lattisaw

from the album Sneakin' Out
- B-side: "Down for You"
- Released: 1982
- Genre: R&B, soul
- Length: 3:58
- Label: Cotillion/Atlantic
- Songwriters: Gary Benson, David Richard Mindell
- Producer: Narada Michael Walden

Stacy Lattisaw singles chronology
"Feel My Love Tonight" (1981)	"Don't Throw It All Away" (1982)	"Attack of the Name Game" (1982)

Stacy Lattisaw covered "Don't Throw It All Away" in 1982. It was the first of three charting singles from her Sneakin' Out LP. The song peaked at number 101 on the Billboard Pop chart and reached the top 10 on the R&B chart.

=== Charts ===
Chart (1982)	Peak position
US Billboard Bubbling Under the Hot 100	101
US Billboard R&B	9

== Other versions ==
- Olivia Newton-John recorded "Don't Throw It All Away" on her 1976 LP Come On Over.
- Barry Manilow recorded "Don't Throw It All Away" on his 1976 LP This One's for You.
- "Don't Throw It All Away" was recorded by Helen Reddy during her 1981 MCA sessions produced by Joel Diamond.
