= OTW (DJ Luke Nasty song) =

Single by DJ Luke Nasty

from the album Highway Music: Stuck In Traffic
- Released: May 12, 2016
- Genre: Hip hop; R&B
- Length: 3:39
- Label: Othaz Records; Empire
- Songwriters: Leterrance Davis; D'wayne Wiggins; Carl Wheeler
- Producer: Mr. Hanky

DJ Luke Nasty singles chronology
"Might Be" (2015)	"OTW" (2016)

Music video
- "OTW" on YouTube

"OTW" (an acronym for "on the way") is a song written and recorded by American hip hop recording artist DJ Luke Nasty from his debut studio album, Highway Music: Stuck In Traffic (2016). The song was released on May 12, 2016, as the second single from the album and contains a sample of the 1990 hit song "Whatever You Want" by Tony! Toni! Toné!.

== Commercial performance ==
The song peaked at number 71 on the US Billboard Hot 100 on January 7, 2017.

== Charts ==
Chart (2016)	Peak position
US Hot R&B/Hip-Hop Songs (Billboard)	47
US Billboard Hot 100	71

== Certifications ==
Region	Certification	Certified units/sales
United States (RIAA)	Gold	500,000^{‡}
^{‡} Sales+streaming figures based on certification alone.
