= Block Party (song) =

Single by Stacy Lattisaw and Johnny Gill

from the album Perfect Combination
- Released: 1984
- Genre: Funk; soul; hi-NRG; disco
- Length: 5:25
- Label: Cotillion (7 99725 (US))
- Songwriter(s): Narada Michael Walden, Preston Glass

Stacy Lattisaw singles chronology
| "Perfect Combination" / "Heartbreak Look" (1984) | "Block Party" (1984) | "Baby It's You" (1984) |

Johnny Gill singles chronology
| "Perfect Combination" / "Heartbreak Look" (1984) | "Block Party" (1984) | "Baby It's You" (1984) |

"Block Party" is a song performed by Stacy Lattisaw and Johnny Gill from their duet album Perfect Combination. The song was written by Narada Michael Walden, who also wrote her uptempo 1980 single "Jump to the Beat". It entered three Billboard charts in total.

== Track listing ==
=== 1984 release ===
12-inch vinyl

- US: Cotillion / 7 99725

Side 1
| No. | Title | Length |
|---|---|---|
| 1. | "Block Party" | 5:25 |
| 2. | "Block Party" | 5:25 |

7-inch vinyl

- US: Cotillion / 7 99725

Side 1
| No. | Title | Length |
|---|---|---|
| 1. | "Block Party" | 4:04 |
| 2. | "Come Out of the Shadows" | 5:19 |

== Chart position ==
| Chart (1984) | Peak position |
|---|---|
| Billboard Hot Dance/Club Play | 48 |
