= I'm Not the Same Girl =

Studio album by Stacy Lattisaw
- Released: July 8, 1985
- Recorded: 1984−1985
- Genre: Soul, R&B
- Length: 27:32
- Label: Cotillion
- Producer: Michael Masser

Stacy Lattisaw chronology
Perfect Combination (1984)	I'm Not the Same Girl (1985)	Take Me All the Way (1986)

Professional ratings
Review scores
Source	Rating
AllMusic	2/5 stars

I'm Not the Same Girl is an album by Stacy Lattisaw, released by Cotillion Records in 1985. All tracks were written and produced by Michael Masser.

The album feature covers of two Masser songs previously recorded by Roberta Flack, "Coming Alive", Diana Ross, "I Thought It Took a Little Time" and "Together" - as well as a version of "Now We're Starting Over Again" originally cut by Dionne Warwick.

It was later re-released by Wounded Bird Records on compact disc.

== Track listing ==
1. "Can't Stop Thinking About You" (Michael Masser, Linda Creed) 4:10
2. "Coming Alive" (Michael Masser, Gerry Goffin) 3:02
3. "Now We're Starting Over Again" (Michael Masser, Gerry Goffin) 3:40
4. "He's Just Not You" (Michael Masser, Randy Goodrum) 3:23
5. "I'm Not the Same Girl" (Michael Masser, Randy Goodrum) 3:50
6. "Toughen Up" (Michael Masser, Randy Goodrum) 2:18
7. "Together" (Michael Masser, Pam Sawyer) 3:37
8. "I Thought It Took a Little Time" (Michael Masser, Pam Sawyer) 3:09

== Personnel ==
- Stacy Lattisaw - vocals
- Michael Masser, producer, rhythm arrangements (1, 3, 4, 7, 8)
- Gene Page - rhythm arrangements (1, 3, 4, 7, 8) strings arrangements (4, 8)
- Robbie Buchanan - electric piano (3, 7, 8), synthesizers (1, 2, 5), arrangements (2, 5)
- Randy Goodrum - acoustic piano (4), synthesizers (6), arrangements (6)
- Randy Kerber - electric piano (1, 4), acoustic piano (7, 8)
- Paul Jackson Jr., Dann Huff - guitar (1, 3, 4, 7, 8)
- Nathan East - bass guitar (1, 4, 8)
- Neil Stubenhaus - bass guitar (3, 7)
- Carlos Vega - drums (1, 4, 8)
- John "JR" Robinson - drums (3, 7)
