= Lori Balmer =

- Also known as: Lori
- Born: 1960 (age 65–66)
- Origin: Sydney, New South Wales, Australia
- Genres: Pop; Country Rock; Rock; Funk
- Occupations: Singer, model, dancer, marketing executive
- Instruments: Vocals; banjo; ukulele; guitar
- Years active: 1966–present
- Labels: RCA; Polydor; Pye

Lori Balmer is an Australian pop singer, recording artist and worked as a session singer and model; and has appeared on TV in Australia, United States, Japan, Europe and Britain.

== Biography ==
=== Early recordings ===
Lori Balmer started singing professionally at an early age. Her debut single, "Banjo Boy", was issued early in 1966, under the name Lori, via RCA Records and includes an orchestra directed by Tommy Tycho. She was reputed to be Australian RCA's youngest recording star at that time. Through her family connection to the Bee Gees members, she was offered two of Barry Gibb's songs, "Who's Been Writing on the Wall Again" and "In Your World", which she recorded at EMI's Sydney Studio. These were issued as her debut singles. All three Gibb brothers provided vocal backing, and Barry Gibb was involved in the production. Lori was a model and was the face of "infanteen" as well as being the face to launch the Australian government's "wear a yellow raincoat" to protect children in the wet.

=== International career ===
In January 1968, following an invitation from Barry Gibb, Balmer travelled to England with her parents and they initially stayed with the Gibb family. She worked regularly on children's TV and radio shows, including The BBC 1 Club. The British press dubbed her the "bush baby" and she occasionally appeared on shows alongside the Bee Gees. In July 1968 she recorded two songs written by the Gibb brothers, "Treacle Brown" and "Four Faces West". All backing and production was provided by the Bee Gees with Bill Shepherd doing the arrangements. Balmer released it as a single via Polydor Records, in November 1968. The record demonstrated a voice more powerful than expected from someone so young, but legal problems prevented her from following it up with further material.

In 1971 Balmer signed to Pye Records, with Tony Atkins producing her single, "Here Before the Sun", which appeared in 1972. She continued working in the UK, including as a support to the Marmalade, the Hollies, Johnny Mathis, and various artists in UK and the rest of Europe. In the mid- to late 1970s, she released singles in Australia, under the name Lori Balmer, where she also toured as a backing singer for Cold Chisel and for Richard Clapton. She was a member of Dalvanius and the Fascinations, worked with the New Zealand funk band, Collision, and appeared regularly on TV. She sang the title song of the Australian movie, Melvin, Son of Alvin (1984). In 1987 she provided backing vocals on the soundtracks of the Australian film, Sons of Steel and, in 1995, Billy's Holiday. She also worked as a print and fashion model, appearing in TV commercials.

She returned often to the UK and the USA, toured or recorded, under pseudonyms with other artists, Tina Turner, Cliff Richard, Bryan Ferry, U2, Joe Cocker, George Harrison, Lionel Richie, Van Halen, Frankie Goes To Hollywood Richie Blackmore, Ozzy Osbourne, Chris Isaak and Johnny Rotten. Through the 1990s to the present Balmer has worked as one of Australia's top session singers and owns a successful marketing company.

== Discography ==
=== Singles ===
List of singles, with selected chart positions
Title	Year	Peak chart positions
Title	Year	AUS
Credited as Lori
"Banjo Boy" / "The Dickey Bird Song"	1966	-
"Who's Been Writing On the Wall" / "In Your World"	1966	-
Credited as Lori Balmer
"Treacle Brown" / "Four Faces West"	1968	-
"Here Before the Sun" / "You're the Only Reason"	1972	-
"Itchy Itch Coo Coo" / "Sing a Happy Song"	1974	-
"Don't Throw It All Away" / "Shoes"	1976	66
"Postcard from Spain" / "Here's Some Love"	1976	-
"Are You Ready for Love" / "Love Ain't Easy"	1978	-
Credited as Lori Balmer & Short Notice
"La Booga Rooga" / "Call on Me"	1979	

== Bibliography ==
- An Australian Rock Discography 1960-1989 - Chris Spencer - Moonlight Publishers - 1990 - ISBN 0-7316-8343-9
