= Johnny Gill (1983 album) =

Studio album by Johnny Gill
- Released: April 12, 1983
- Recorded: September 1982 – March 1983
- Genre: R&B, soul, pop
- Length: 41:02
- Label: Cotillion
- Producer: Freddie Perren

Johnny Gill chronology
Johnny Gill (1983)	Perfect Combination (1984)

Singles from Johnny Gill
- 1. "Super Love" Released: March 23, 1983; 2. "When Something Is Wrong with My Baby" Released: June 1983; 3. "Show Her Love" Released: November 8, 1983

Professional ratings
Review scores
Source	Rating
AllMusic	3/5 stars

Johnny Gill is the debut studio album (Note: Gill had a second eponymous album released in 1990.) by American singer-songwriter Johnny Gill, released on April 6, 1983, by Cotillion Records. The album was produced by Freddie Perren. It did not chart in the United States; however, the album's two singles, "Super Love" and "When Something Is Wrong with My Baby", peaked at number 29 and number 57 on the Billboard R&B chart, respectively.

== Track listing ==
No.	Title	Writer(s)	Length
1.	"Super Love"	Keni St. Lewis; Freddie Perren; Elliot Wolff	4:51
2.	"Thank You"	Keni St. Lewis; Freddie Perren; Elliot Wolff	4:30
3.	"Show Her Love"	Ric Wyatt, Jr.	3:35
4.	"Guilty"	Keni St. Lewis; Freddie Perren; Elliot Wolff	3:38
5.	"When Something Is Wrong with My Baby" (Sam & Dave cover)	Isaac Hayes; David Porter	3:58
6.	"Every Radio"	Ric Wyatt, Jr.	4:04
7.	"I'm Sorry"	Ric Wyatt, Jr.; Kristeen Young	3:56
8.	"I Love Makin' Music"	Freddie Perren; Elliot Wolff	5:12
9.	"You"	Frederick Knight	3:27
10.	"Half Steppin'"	Ric Wyatt, Jr.; Larry R. McIntosh	3:51
Total length:			41:02

== Personnel ==
- Johnny Gill – lead vocals, backing vocals, bass, lead guitar, drums, bongos
- Freddie Perren – arranger, producer, synthesizer bass, rhythm arrangements, drum programming
- Clarence McDonald – piano
- Cornelius Mims – bass
- Carmen Twillie – backing vocals
- Eddie Watkins – bass
- Elliot Wolff – synthesizer, Fender Rhodes, arranger
- Dennis King – mastering
- Maxine Waters – backing vocals
- Julia Waters – backing vocals
- Ric Wyatt Jr. – synthesizer, arranger, piano, synthesizer bass, producer, backing vocals, keyboards
- David Michael Kennedy – photography
- Ed Biggs – engineer, remixing
- Ronald Adkins – backing vocals
- Larry R. McIntosh – backing vocals
- Harold Ferguson – backing vocals
- James Goforth – engineer
- Gene Page – string arrangements
- Wade Marcus – string arrangements
- Bob Brown – remixing
- Lawrence Hilton-Jacobs – synthesizer strings
- John Barnes – Fender Rhodes
- Robert Bowles – guitar programming
- Leon "Ndugu" Chancler – drums
- Charles Fearing – guitar
