= Perfect Combination/Heartbreak Look =

Single by Stacy Lattisaw and Johnny Gill

from the album Perfect Combination
- A-side: "Perfect Combination"
- B-side: "Heartbreak Look"
- Released: January 24, 1984
- Recorded: 1983
- Genre: R&B
- Length: 4:09 ("Perfect Combination"); 5:33 ("Heartbreak Look")
- Label: Cotillion
- Songwriters: Narada Michael Walden; Preston Glass
- Producers: Narada Michael Walden; Preston Glass

Johnny Gill singles chronology
"When Something Is Wrong with My Baby" (1983)	""Perfect Combination" / "Heartbreak Look"" (1984)	"Block Party" (1984)

Stacy Lattisaw chronology
Million Dollar Babe (1983)	Perfect Combination"/"Heartbreak Look (1984)	Block Party (1984)

"Perfect Combination" / "Heartbreak Look" is a song performed by Stacy Lattisaw and Johnny Gill, issued as the lead single from their collaboration album Perfect Combination. Released in 1984, the single peaked at #75 on the Billboard Hot 100; becoming Gill's first single to appear on the chart.

== Chart positions ==
Chart (1984)	Peak position
US Billboard Hot 100	75
US Hot R&B/Hip-Hop Singles & Tracks (Billboard)	10
