= Sneakin' Out =

Studio album by Stacy Lattisaw
- Released: August 10, 1982
- Recorded: November 1981 – January 1982
- Genres: Soul; R&B; pop
- Length: 40:54
- Labels: Cotillion/Atlantic; 90002
- Producer: Narada Michael Walden

Stacy Lattisaw chronology
With You (1981)	Sneakin' Out (1982)	Sixteen (1983)

Professional ratings
Review scores
Source	Rating
Allmusic	3/5 stars

Sneakin' Out is the fourth studio album by American singer Stacy Lattisaw, who was 15 years old at the time of the album's release. The single, "Don't Throw it All Away", peaked at number nine on the U.S. R&B chart in 1982.

== Track listing ==
1. "Sneakin' Out" – 5:50
2. "Guys Like You (Give Love a Bad Name)" – 4:03
3. "Memories" – 4:08
4. "Tonight I'm Gonna Make You Mine" – 3:04
5. "Hey There Lonely Boy" – 3:54
6. "Don't Throw It All Away" – 4:04
7. "Attack of the Name Game" – 6:25
8. "I'm Down for You" – 5:10
9. "I Could Love You So Divine" – 4:16

== Personnel ==
- Stacy Lattisaw – lead and backing Vocals
- Narada Michael Walden – drums, keyboards, percussion, piano
- Randy Jackson – bass
- Frank Martin – keyboards, synthesizer
- Corrado Rustici, "Joe-Bob" Castelle Blanch – guitar
- Sheila Escovedo – percussion
- Michael Gibbs – tenor saxophone
- Gary Herbig – alto saxophone
- Marc Russo – trumpet
- Jim Gilstrap, John Lehman, Cathy Miller, Kelly Kool, Myrna Mathews, Roy Galloway – backing vocals

== Legacy ==
This album is noted for featuring future American Idol judge Randy Jackson on bass. Also the song "Attack of the Name Game" would later be sampled by Mariah Carey as part of her 1999 number-one pop hit "Heartbreaker."

== Charts ==
Chart (1982)	Peak position
Billboard 200	55
Billboard Top R&B Albums	11

=== Singles ===
Year	Single	Chart positions	
Year	Single	US Hot 100	US R&B
1982	"Don't Throw It All Away"	101	9
1982	"Attack of the Name Game"	70	14
1982	"Hey There Lonely Boy"	108	71
