= Take Me All the Way =

Studio album by Stacy Lattisaw
- Released: 1986
- Recorded: 1986
- Length: 40:34
- Label: Motown
- Producer: Kashif, Narada Michael Walden, John Benitez, Leon Sylvers III, Steve Barri, Tony Peluso

Stacy Lattisaw chronology
I'm Not the Same Girl (1985)	Take Me All the Way (1986)	Personal Attention (1988)

Take Me All the Way is an album by the American musician Stacy Lattisaw, released in 1986 on Motown Records. The album features the song "Nail It to the Wall". The Washington Post concluded that, "though Lattisaw's voice has developed muscles and her new aggressive approach is an improvement over her bubblegum soul beginnings, her phrasing and musical personality remain unformed; she sounds like a girl playing dress-up."

== Track listing with credits ==
Side A

1. "Jump into My Life" (Kashif, Paul Gurvitz) 4:17
  - Backing Vocals – Audrey Wheeler, Larry Smith, Cindy Mizelle
  - Arranged By [Backing Vocals], Keyboards, Producer, Synthesizer – Kashif
  - Drum Programming, Associate Producer, Synthesizer – Paul Gurvitz
  - Guitar – Ira Siegel
  - Percussion – Bashiri Johnson
  - Associate Producer, Synthesizer [Ox-1] – Jeff Smith
2. "The Hard Way" (Doug James, Sue Schifrin) 3:33
  - Arranged By, Drum Programming, Keyboards, Synthesizer – Jim Lang
  - Arranged By, Guitar [Additional], Producer, Synthesizer [Additional] – Tony Peluso
  - Backing Vocals – Alex Brown, Brenda Lee Eager, Ivory Stone, Julia Tillman Waters, Maxine Willard Waters, Patricia Henley
  - Drums [Augmentation] – Fred Alwag
  - Producer – Steve Barri
  - Soloist, Lyricon – Richard Elliot
3. "Take Me All the Way" (Narada Michael Walden, Preston Glass) 4:14
  - Arranged By, Drum Programming, Percussion, Producer – Narada Michael Walden
  - Backing Vocals – Claytoven Richardson, Jeanie Tracy, Karen Brewington
  - Bass – Randy Jackson
  - Guitar – Corrado Rustici
  - Additional Keyboards – Walter Afanasieff
  - Keyboards – Preston Glass
4. "A Little Bit of Heaven" (Arnie Roman, Stephen Broughton Lunt) 3:55
  - Arranged By, Additional Keyboards, Producer – Tony Peluso
  - Arranged By, Keyboards, Synthesizer – John Hobbs
  - Backing Vocals – Alex Brown, Julia Tillman Waters, Maxine Willard Waters
  - Bass – Joe Chemay
  - Drums – Paul Leim
  - Guitar – Dann Huff
  - Additional Keyboards – Jim Lang
  - Percussion – Paulinho Da Costa
  - Producer – Steve Barri
  - Synclavier – Dale Echnoz
  - Soloist, Lyricon – Richard Elliot
5. "Longshot" (Alan Roy Scott, Gary Pickus) 4:32
  - Arranged By, Keyboards, Synthesizer – John Hobbs
  - Backing Vocals – Alex Brown, Julia Tillman Waters, Maxine Willard Waters
  - Bass – Joe Chemay
  - Drums – Paul Leim
  - Guitar [Fills], Producer – Tony Peluso
  - Producer – Steve Barri
  - Synclavier – Craig Harris
  - Rhythm Guitar – Dann Huff

Side B

1. "Nail It to the Wall" (Arnie Roman, Stephen Broughton Lunt) 4:42
  - Arranged By, Backing Vocals, Drums, Producer – Jellybean
  - Arranged By, Percussion, Synthesizer – Fred Zarr
  - Backing Vocals – Audrey Wheeler, Louie Vega, Wendell Morrison
  - Percussion – Bashiri Johnson
  - Saxophone – Jeff Smith
  - Vocoder – Stephen Bray
2. "Love Me Like the First Time" (Frank Wildhorn, Gary Benson) 3:25
  - Arranged By, Keyboards, Synthesizer – John Hobbs
  - Bass – Joe Chemay
  - Drums – Paul Leim
  - Guitar [Fills], Producer – Tony Peluso
  - Producer – Steve Barri
  - Synclavier – Dale Echnoz
  - Rhythm Guitar – Dann Huff
3. "You Ain't Leavin'" (Bob Garrett, Jack Conrad) 3:48
  - Arranged By, Bass, Drum Programming, Producer – Leon F. Sylvers III
  - Arranged By, Keyboards – Joey Gallo
  - Backing Vocals – Angie Sylvers, Charmaine Sylvers, Edmund Sylvers
  - Keyboards – William Bryant III
  - Soloist, Saxophone – Scott Roewe
4. "Over the Top" (Alan Gorrie, Jeff Bova, Michael Mugrage) 4:25
  - Arranged By, Drum Programming, Keyboards, Synthesizer – Jim Lang
  - Arranged By, Producer, Additional Synthesizer – Tony Peluso
  - Backing Vocals – Brenda Lee Eager, Ivory Stone, Patricia Henley
  - Drums [Augmentation] – Fred Alwag
  - Guitar – Paul Jackson, Jr.
  - Lyricon [Solo] – Richard Elliot
  - Percussion – Paulinho Da Costa
  - Additional Percussion, Producer – Steve Barri
5. "One More Night" (Brian Potter, Frank Wildhorn) 3:43
  - Backing Vocals – Audrey Wheeler, Cindy Mizelle, Shelly Scruggs
  - Co-producer, Drum Programming, Programmed By [Ox-1], Synthesizer – Shelly Scruggs
  - Co-producer, Bass, Keyboards, Synthesizer [Rx-11] – Brian Morgan
  - Guitar – Ira Siegel
  - Percussion – Bashiri Johnson
  - Producer – Kashif
