= Personal Attention =

Studio album by Stacy Lattisaw
- Released: January 21, 1988
- Recorded: 1987, Minnesota, California & Florida
- Genres: Pop, soul
- Length: 41:38
- Label: Motown
- Producers: Brownmark, Aaron Knight, Jerry Zigman, Lou Pace, Vincent Brantley, Ron Kersey

Stacy Lattisaw chronology
Take Me All the Way (1986)	Personal Attention (1988)	What You Need (1989)

Personal Attention is the ninth album by the American singer Stacy Lattisaw, released on January 21, 1988, on Motown Records. It features backing vocals by Johnny Gill, Karyn White, Howard Hewett, David Lasley, and Lynn Davis. It includes a cover of the Marvin Gaye and Tammi Terrell song, "Ain't No Mountain High Enough".

== Critical reception ==
The Washington Post wrote that Lattisaw's "voice has shed its teen nasality and coyness for a gorgeous, full-throated adult woman's range, but the singer still needs to find her own distinctive style, as she tries on the successful formulas originated by Janet Jackson and Whitney Houston." The Los Angeles Times determined that "tracks like 'Love Town', 'Let Me Take You Down' and 'Every Drop of Your Love' are coming-of-age statements from a pop/soul performer who always had potential, but never pushed it quite this far."

== Track listing with credits ==
Side A

1. "Personal Attention" (Brownmark)
  - Recording and mixing engineer – John Black
  - Sound engineer – Richard Markowitz
  - Produced and arranged by – Brownmark
2. Love Town (Vincent Brantley)
  - Backing vocals – Karyn White, Vincent Brantley
  - Production coordinator – Dina Andrews
  - Mixing engineer – Taavi Mote, Vincent Brantley
  - Recording Engineer – Joel Soifer, Vincent Brantley
  - Producer, arranged by, instruments – Vincent Brantley
3. "Let Me Take You Down" (Lou Pace and The Blitz)
  - Strings arranged and conducted – Juanito Márquez
  - Bass – Reginald White
  - Drums – Harry King
  - Assistant engineer – Frank Cesarano, Mike Strick, Paul Van Puffelen
  - Keyboards – David Rosenthal, Emridge Jones
  - Producer – Lou Pace
  - Programmed by – David Rosenthal
  - Recorded and mixed by – Jerrold Soloman
  - Saxophone – Ed Calle
4. "Ain't No Mountain High Enough" (Duet with Howard Hewett) (Nickolas Ashford, Valerie Simpson)
  - Rhythm and vocals arranged by – Jerry Knight
  - Backing vocals – Howard Hewett, Stacy Lattisaw
  - Mixing engineer – Darren Klein
  - Recording engineer – Csaba Petocz
  - Producer, instruments, programmed by – Aaron Zigman, Jerry Knight
5. "He's Got a Hold on Me" (Brownmark, Michael Ligon, Stacy Lattisaw, William Beall)
  - Backing vocals – Brownmark, Cynthia Johnson, Mersadies
  - Recording and mixing engineer – John Black
  - Sound engineer – Richard Markowitz
  - Producer, arranged by – Brownmark
  - Saxophone – Kenneth Holmen

Side B

1. "Find Another Lover" (Brownmark)
  - Recording and mixing engineer – John Black
  - Sound engineer – Richard Markowitz
  - Produced and arranged by – Brownmark
2. Changes (Bennie Melton, Jr., Brownmark, Joseph Lattisaw, Jr., Stacy Lattisaw)
  - Backing vocals – Brownmark, Johnny Gill
  - Recording and mixing engineer – John Black
  - Sound engineer – Richard Markowitz
  - Producer, arranged by – Brownmark
  - Saxophone – Robert Martin
3. "Every Drop of Your Love" (Alex Brown, Ron Kersey)
  - Arranged by [Background] – Alex Brown
  - Backing vocals – Alex Brown, Lynn Davis, Phillip Ingram, Sandy Simmons
  - Engineer [mixing] [second] – Jim Champagne
  - Engineer [recording] [second] – Glen Kurtz
  - Engineer [remix] [second] – Jim Dineen
  - Guitar – Paul Jackson Jr.
  - Producer, arranged by, Kkeyboards – Ron Kersey
  - Programmed by – Aaron Smith
  - Recorded by, mixed by – Hill Swimmer
4. "Call Me" (Lou Pace, The Blitz)
  - Backing vocals – Emeridge Jones, Gary King, Stacy Lattisaw
  - Bass – Gary King
  - Drum programming – Jimmy Bralower
  - Assistant engineer – Frank Cesarano, Mike Strick, Paul Van Puffelen
  - Keyboards – David Rosenthal, Emeridge Jones
  - Percussion – Harry King
  - Producer – Lou Pace
  - Rap – Reginald White
  - Recorded by, mixed by – Jerrold Solomon
5. "Electronic Eyes" (Alex Brown, Ron Kersey)
  - Arranged by [background] – Alex Brown
  - Backing vocals – Alex Brown, Carl Carwell, David Lasley, Lynn Davis
  - Bass – Melvin Davis
  - Engineer [mixing] [second] – Jim Champagne
  - Engineer [recording] [second] – Glen Kurtz
  - Guitar – Paul Jackson Jr.
  - Producer, Arranged by, Keyboards – Ron Kersey
  - Programmed by – Aaron Smith
  - Recorded by, mixed by – Hill Swimmer

== Charts ==
=== Weekly charts ===
Chart (1988)	Peak position
US Billboard 200	153
US Top R&B/Hip-Hop Albums (Billboard)	24

=== Year-end charts ===
Chart (1988)	Position
US Top R&B/Hip-Hop Albums (Billboard)	85
