= Dynamite! (song) =

Single by Stacy Lattisaw

from the album Let Me Be Your Angel
- B-side: "Dreaming"
- Released: 1980
- Recorded: 1980
- Genre: Post-disco, funk
- Length: 6:07
- Label: Cotillion
- Songwriter(s): Narada Michael Walden; Bunny Hull
- Producer(s): Narada Michael Walden

Stacy Lattisaw singles chronology
"When You're Young and in Love" (1979)	"Dynamite!" (1980)	"Jump to the Beat" (1980)

"Dynamite!" is a song produced by Narada Michael Walden, co-written by Walden and Bunny Hull, and recorded by Stacy Lattisaw for her second studio album Let Me Be Your Angel (1980). The song was released as the lead single from Let Me Be Your Angel in 1980.

== Chart performance ==
In the United States, "Dynamite!" did not make the Billboard Hot 100, but it hit number one on the Dance Club Songs chart (where it was her only number-one hit in general), and it peaked at number eight on the Hot R&B/Hip Hop Songs chart. Lattisaw was just 13 years old when she made it to number-one and was the youngest act to have a number-one single on the Dance Club Songs chart at that time.

== Track listings and formats ==
7" single

1. "Dynamite!" – 4:20
2. "Dreaming" – 4:45

12" single

1. "Dynamite!" – 5:58
2. "Dreaming" – 4:45

== Charts ==
Chart (1980)	Peak position
UK Singles (Official Charts Company)	51
US Disco Top 100 (Billboard)	1
US Hot Soul Singles (Billboard)	8
