= Favorites (Johnny Gill album) =

Greatest hits album by Johnny Gill
- Released: November 11, 1997
- Genre: R&B
- Label: Motown

Johnny Gill chronology
Let's Get the Mood Right (1996)	Favorites (1997)	Ultimate Collection (2002)

Favorites is a compilation album of hit songs by R&B singer Johnny Gill.

Joe Warminsky of Potomac News stated that while the songs on the album "sound slightly dated instead of classic", they nonetheless feature Gill's "big bag of vocal tricks".

== Track listing ==
1. "My, My, My"
2. "Quiet Time to Play"
3. "There U Go"
4. "Lady Dujour"
5. "If You're Wondering"
6. "Having Illusions"
7. "Where Do We Go From Here"
8. "Rub You the Right Way" (Remix)
9. "Fairweather Friend"
10. "Wrap My Body Tight"
11. "I Got You"
12. "Let's Get the Mood Right"
13. "Maybe"
14. "Give Love on Christmas Day" (Hidden bonus track)
