= Super Love (Johnny Gill song) =

Single by Johnny Gill

from the album Johnny Gill
- B-side: "I'm Sorry"
- Released: 1983
- Genre: R&B, Pop
- Length: 4:34
- Label: Cotillion
- Songwriter(s): Elliot Wolff; Freddie Perren; Keni St. Lewis
- Producer(s): Freddie Perren

Johnny Gill singles chronology
"Super Love" (1983)	"When Something Is Wrong with My Baby" (1983)

"Super Love" is a song performed by Johnny Gill. It is the opening track on his first eponymous album and was issued as the album's first single. The song peaked at #29 on the Billboard R&B chart in 1983.

== Chart positions ==
Chart (1983)	Peak position
US R&B Singles (Billboard)	29
