= Wrap My Body Tight =

Single by Johnny Gill

from the album Johnny Gill
- Released: February 5, 1991
- Recorded: 1989
- Genre: R&B, new jack swing
- Length: 4:40 (album version); 3:44 (remix version)
- Label: Motown
- Songwriter: James Harris III, Terry Lewis
- Producers: Jimmy Jam & Terry Lewis

Johnny Gill singles chronology
| "Fairweather Friend" (1990) | "Wrap My Body Tight" (1991) | "Word to the Mutha!" (1991) |

"Wrap My Body Tight" is a song by American singer Johnny Gill, released in February 1991 by Motown, as the fourth single from his self-titled debut album (1990). It is written and produced by Jimmy Jam & Terry Lewis. The song peaked at number one on the US Billboard Hot R&B chart, and reached numbers 84 and 89 on the Billboard Hot 100 and Cash Box Top 100 charts. A remix of the song features additional vocals by Karyn White.

== Charts ==
| Chart (1991) | Peak position |
|---|---|
| Netherlands (Dutch Top 40 Tipparade) | 2 |
| Netherlands (Single Top 100) | 47 |
| UK Singles (Official Charts) | 57 |
| US Billboard Hot 100 | 84 |
| US Hot R&B/Hip-Hop Songs (Billboard) | 1 |
| US Cash Box Top 100 | 89 |

== See also ==
- List of number-one R&B singles of 1991 (U.S.)
