= Let Me Be Your Angel (album) =

Studio album by Stacy Lattisaw
- Released: May 21, 1980
- Recorded: 1979–1980
- Studio: Arrest (Washington); Power Station (New York); Record Plant (Sausalito); Rusk (Los Angeles)
- Label: Cotillion
- Producer: Narada Michael Walden, Bunny Hull

Stacy Lattisaw chronology
Young And In Love (1979)	Let Me Be Your Angel (1980)	With You (1981)

Professional ratings
Review scores
Source	Rating
AllMusic	3/5 stars

Let Me Be Your Angel is the second studio album by American singer Stacy Lattisaw. Released on May 21, 1980, by Cotillion Records, Lattisaw was 13 years old when this album was released. The album's first two singles, "Dynamite!" and "Jump to the Beat", both peaked at number one on the U.S. disco charts in 1980. This would be her first album produced by Narada Michael Walden.

== Track listing ==
All tracks composed by Bunny Hull and Narada Michael Walden; except where indicated

1. "Jump to the Beat" (Lisa Walden, Narada Michael Walden) – 5:20
2. "Dynamite!" – 6:07
3. "You Don't Love Me Anymore" – 3:17
4. "Dreaming" – 4:47
5. "Let Me Be Your Angel" – 4:03
6. "Don't You Want to Feel It (For Yourself)" – 5:55
7. "You Know I Like It" (Corrado Rustici, Narada Michael Walden) – 5:23
8. "My Love" (Narada Michael Walden) – 4:52

== Charts ==
Chart (1980)	Peak position
Billboard 200	44
Billboard Top R&B Albums	9

=== Singles ===
Year	Single	Chart positions		
Year	Single	US Hot 100	US R&B	US Dance
1980	"Dynamite!"	—	8	1
1980	"Jump to the Beat"	—	?	1
1980	"Let Me Be Your Angel"	21	8	—

== Personnel ==
- Stacy Lattisaw – lead and backing vocals
- Narada Michael Walden – drums, keyboards, percussion, piano
- Nile Rodgers, Corrado Rustici – electric guitar
- Bernard Edwards, T. M. Stevens – bass
- Randy Jackson – acoustic and electric bass
- Frank Martin – keyboards
- Jim Gilstrap, Carla Vaughn, Judy Jones – backing vocals
- The Seaward Horns – horns
- Michael Gibbs – string arrangements
- Jerry Hey – horn arrangements
