= Half Crazy =

Single by Johnny Gill

from the album Chemistry
- B-side: "Chemistry"
- Released: 1984
- Recorded: 1984
- Genre: R&B
- Length: 4:16
- Label: Cotillion
- Songwriter(s): Linda Creed; Lonnie Jordan
- Producer(s): Linda Creed

Johnny Gill singles chronology
"Baby It's You" (1984)	"Half Crazy" (1984)	"Can't Wait Til Tomorrow" (1985)

"Half Crazy" is a song performed by Johnny Gill. It is the opening track on his second studio album Chemistry and was issued as the album's lead single. Released in 1984, the single peaked at #26 on the Billboard R&B chart in 1985.

== Chart positions ==
Chart (1985)	Peak position
US Hot R&B/Hip-Hop Singles & Tracks (Billboard)	26
