= Chemistry (Johnny Gill album) =

Studio album by Johnny Gill
- Released: April 22, 1985
- Recorded: 1984−1985
- Genre: R&B
- Length: 36:03
- Label: Cotillion Records
- Producer: Linda Creed, Bill Neale, Dennis Matkosky

Johnny Gill chronology
Perfect Combination (1984)	Chemistry (1985)	Johnny Gill (1990)

Professional ratings
Review scores
Source	Rating
Allmusic	2.5/5 stars
The Washington Post	"The Ballads of Johnny Gill"

Chemistry is the second solo album by singer Johnny Gill. It was released on April 22, 1985.

== Reception ==
Richard Harrington of the Washington Post wrote, "Gill is 18. He just sounds older. On his recent hit single "Half Crazy," Gill's husky, powerful baritone would lead to you to think he'd been around the love wars long enough to do some postgraduate work. But the cover photo for his "Chemistry" album and the "Half Crazy" video show a slightly built kid with a soft, innocent stare, looking like he just got out of high school. Which he has...For his new album he was teamed with veteran producer and songwriter Linda Creed, who had worked with Thom Bell on the Delfonics', Stylistics' and Spinners' recordings but dropped out of the business for five years to raise her family...That new combination, he feels, is going to put him that much closer to his dream: 'to sell 40 million copies like Michael and then get into the movies.' Luckily Gill's strengths as a ballad singer coincide with commercial radio's currently receptive attitude toward medium tempo, romantic material...But will the world go along with a ballad singer who's so young? 'That's what we've all got to find out very soon,' Gill says evenly. 'I know this one may not go gold. But I'm going to spray paint it.'"

--Excerpted from "The Ballads of Johnny Gill," Washington Post, June 22, 1985

Peter Judge wrote, "This is one of those albums that should have been bigger. Gill is only 18 but as far as singing he can hang with the big boys. Gill's rich tenor makes a song like "Half Crazy" a real gem. In a few years, watch out Luther Vandross."

--Excerpted from "Boss Rocked '85," The Rock Hill Herald, January 2, 1986

== Track listing ==
1. "Half Crazy" (Linda Creed, Lonnie Jordan) – 4:14
2. "Can't Wait Til Tomorrow" (Barry Alfanzo, Dennis Matkosky, Bill Neale) – 4:45
3. "Don't Take Away My Pride" (Creed, Jordan, Freeman King, Kent Perkins) – 4:30
4. "One Small Light" (Dennis Matkosky, Dan Sembello, Kathy Wakefield) – 4:13
5. "The Way That You Love Me" (Bobby Caldwell, Jason Schees, Aaron Zigman) – 4:20
6. "Because of You" (Creed, Leslie Hall, John Lind, Matkosky) – 5:42
7. "Chemistry" (Matkosky, Richard Wolf) – 4:44
8. "I Found Love" (Monty Seward, Deniece Williams) – 3:26

== Personnel ==
- Johnny Gill - lead vocals
- Darryl Phinnessee, Edie Lehmann, Jim Gilstrap, Lynn Davis, Lonnie Jordan, Monte Seward, Linda Creed - backing Vocals
- Jeff Baxter (solo and guitar synth on track 5), Paul Jackson Jr., Bill Neale (twelve-string on track 6) - guitars
- Russell Ferrante - keyboards, acoustic and Fender Rhodes electric piano
- Kevin Grady, Dan Sembello, Stewart Levine, Monte Seward - synthesizers
- Dennis Matkosky - synthesizers, Linn and Simmons drum programming
- Ray Nealpolitan, Reggie McBride, Louis Johnson, Neil Stubenhaus, Abraham Laboriel - bass
- Ricky Lawson - drums
- Paulinho da Costa - percussion

== Charts ==
Album - Billboard (United States)

Year	Chart	Position
1985	Top R&B/Hip-Hop Albums	51

Singles - Billboard (United States)

Year	Song	Chart	Position
1985	Can't Wait Til Tomorrow	Hot R&B/Hip-Hop Singles and Tracks	59
1985	Half Crazy	Hot R&B/Hip-Hop Singles and Tracks	26
2002	Half Crazy	Hot R&B/Hip-Hop Singles and Tracks	69

== Personnel ==
- Johnny Gill – Vocals
- Linda Creed – Background Vocals, Producer
- Scott MacMinn – Assistant Engineer
- Michael Mason – Overdubs, Drum Programming, Assistant Engineer
- Dennis Matkosky – Synthesizer, Rhythm Arrangements, Producer
- Reggie McBride – Bass
- Sy Mitchell – Engineer
- Bill Neale – 12-String Guitar, Conductor, Producer, Rhythm Arrangements
- Ray Neapolitan – Bass
- Darryl Phinnessee – Background Vocals
- Marc Russo – Saxophone
- Danny Sembello – Synthesizer
- Monty Seward – Synthesizer, Background Vocals
- Neil Stubenhaus – Bass
- Joe Tarsia – Engineer
- Howard Lee Wolen – Mixing
- Richard Wolf – Songwriter
- Casey Young – Synthesizer
- Jay Willis – Assistant Engineer
- Thom Wilson – Engineer, Mixing
- David Koenig – Assistant Engineer
- Clyde Kaplan – Assistant Engineer
- Joe Borja – Assistant Engineer
- Frank Moscati – Photography
- Zal Schreiber – Mastering
- Robert Lagarza – Assistant Engineer
- Glen McKee – Assistant Engineer
- Audrey Satterwhite – Art Direction
- Rob Weaver – Assistant Engineer
- Barry Craig – Assistant Engineer
- Lonnie Jordan – Background Vocals
- Gene Page – Conductor, String Arrangements
- Jeff Baxter – Guitar, Guitar (Synthesizer)
- Les Brockman – Engineer
- Paulinho Da Costa – Percussion
- Lynn Davis – Background Vocals
- Don Renaldo – Concert Master
- Russell Ferrante – Piano, Keyboards, Fender Rhodes
- Jim Gilstrap – Background Vocals
- Kevin Grady – Synthesizer
- Gary Grant – Trumpet
- Jerry Hey – Trumpet, Horn Arrangements
- Alan Hirshberg – Engineer
- Paul Jackson, Jr. – Guitar
- Louis Johnson – Bass
- Abraham Laboriel – Bass
- Ricky Lawson – Drums
- Edie Lehmann – Background Vocals
- Gene Leone – Engineer
- Stewart Levine – Synthesizer
- Bill Reichenbach Jr. – Trombone
