= When Something Is Wrong with My Baby =

1967 single by Sam & Dave

- Italian release picture sleeve

Single by Sam & Dave

from the album Double Dynamite
- B-side: "Small Portion of Your Love"
- Released: 1967
- Recorded: 1967
- Genre: Soul
- Length: 3:17
- Label: Stax; Atlantic (S-210)
- Songwriters: Isaac Hayes; David Porter
- Producers: Isaac Hayes; David Porter; Booker T. & the MG's

Sam & Dave singles chronology
| "You Got Me Hummin'" (1966) | "When Something Is Wrong with My Baby" (1967) | "Soothe Me" (1967) |

"When Something Is Wrong with My Baby" is a soul ballad written by Isaac Hayes and David Porter. It was first released in 1967 by Sam & Dave on their album Double Dynamite released on Stax Records.

== Original Sam & Dave version ==
=== Personnel ===
- Vocals by Sam Moore and Dave Prater
- Instrumentation by Booker T. & the M.G.'s and Mar-Keys Horns
- Mastering Engineer – Rick O'Neil

=== In popular culture ===
- The song is featured in 2012 film Stand Up Guys, in a scene where Val (Al Pacino) asks a girl to dance with him.
- The song is featured in 1995 film Dead Presidents.
- The song is also featured in Edgar Wright's 2017 film, Baby Driver, in the scene where Bats Jefferson (Jamie Foxx) forces Baby (Ansel Elgort) and the heist crew to go eat at Bo's Diner, where Baby's love interest Debora (Lily James) is working.

=== Charts ===
| Chart (1967) | Peak position |
|---|---|
| US Billboard Hot 100 | 42 |
| US Hot R&B/Hip-Hop Songs (Billboard) | 2 |

== Johnny Gill version ==
"When Something Is Wrong with My Baby"

Single by Johnny Gill

from the album Johnny Gill
- B-side: "Half Steppin'"
- Released: 1983
- Genre: R&B
- Length: 3:58
- Label: Cotillion
- Songwriters: Isaac Hayes; David Porter
- Producer: Freddie Perren

Johnny Gill singles chronology
| "Super Love" (1983) | "When Something Is Wrong with My Baby" (1983) | "Perfect Combination / Heartbreak Look" (1984) |

In 1983, American contemporary R&B singer Johnny Gill covered "When Something Is Wrong with My Baby" and included it on his first eponymous album. The song was issued as the second and final single from the album; and it peaked at #57 on the Billboard R&B chart.

=== Charts ===
| Chart (1983) | Peak position |
|---|---|
| US R&B Singles (Billboard) | 57 |

== Jimmy Barnes and John Farnham version ==
"When Something Is Wrong with My Baby"

Single by Jimmy Barnes and John Farnham

from the album Soul Deep
- B-side: "All I Got"
- Released: October 28, 1991
- Studio: Freight Train (Australia)
- Length: 4:56
- Label: Mushroom
- Songwriters: Isaac Hayes; David Porter
- Producer: Don Gehman

Jimmy Barnes singles chronology
| "I Gotcha!" (1991) | "When Something Is Wrong with My Baby" (1991) | "Ain't No Mountain High Enough" (1992) |

John Farnham singles chronology
| "In Days to Come" (1991) | "When Something Is Wrong with My Baby" (1991) | "Please Don't Ask Me" (1991) |

In 1991, Australian singers Jimmy Barnes and John Farnham recorded and released "When Something Is Wrong with My Baby" as the second single from Barnes' fifth studio album, Soul Deep. Released in October 1991, the song peaked at number three in Australia and number six in New Zealand.

=== Track listing ===
CD single

1. "When Something Is Wrong with My Baby" – 4:56
2. "All I Got" (Jimmy Barnes) – 4:20

=== Charts ===
==== Weekly charts ====
| Chart (1991–1992) | Peak position |
|---|---|
| Australia (ARIA) | 3 |
| New Zealand (Recorded Music NZ) | 6 |

==== Year-end charts ====
| Chart (1991) | Position |
|---|---|
| Australia (ARIA) | 77 |

=== Certifications ===
| Region | Certification | Certified units/sales |
|---|---|---|
| Australia (ARIA) | Platinum | 70,000^{^} |
| New Zealand (RMNZ) | Gold | 5,000^{*} |
^{*} Sales figures based on certification alone.^{^} Shipments figures based on certification alone.

== Other versions ==
The song was covered by:

- Yugoslav band Mladi Levi, on their 1969 EP Mila mala.
- Sonny James in 1976 reaching number 6 on Billboard’s Hot Country singles chart.
- Linda Ronstadt and Aaron Neville as a duet in from the 1990 triple platinum album Cry Like a Rainstorm, Howl Like the Wind, which reached the top five on the Adult Contemporary chart.
- In 1985 a cover by American country music artist Joe Stampley from his album I'll Still Be Loving You peaked at number 67 on the Billboard Hot Country Singles chart.
