= Perfect Combination =

Studio album by Stacy Lattisaw and Johnny Gill
- Released: February 13, 1984
- Recorded: November 1983
- Genres: R&B; soul; dance-pop; synth-pop; funk; pop
- Length: 36:55
- Label: Cotillion
- Producer: Narada Michael Walden

Stacy Lattisaw chronology
Sixteen (1983)	Perfect Combination (1984)	I'm Not the Same Girl (1985)

Johnny Gill chronology
Johnny Gill (1983)	Perfect Combination (1984)	Chemistry (1985)

Singles from Perfect Combination
- 1. "Perfect Combination" / "Heartbreak Look" Released: January 31, 1984; 2. "Baby It's You" Released: April 12, 1984; 3. "Block Party" Released: June 09, 1984

Professional ratings
Review scores
Source	Rating
AllMusic	3/5 stars

Perfect Combination is a collaboration album by American contemporary R&B singers Stacy Lattisaw and Johnny Gill, released on February 13, 1984, via Cotillion Records. The album peaked at number 139 on the Billboard 200. Three singles were released from the album: "Perfect Combination" / "Heartbreak Look", "Block Party" and a cover of the Shirelles' "Baby It's You". "Perfect Combination" / "Heartbreak Look" was the only single from the album to chart on the Billboard Hot 100, peaking at number 75 in 1984.

== Track listing ==
All music is composed by Narada Michael Walden, except tracks 2, 4, 6 and 8 co-produced by Preston Glass.

No.	Title	Writer(s)	Length
1.	"Block Party"	Narada Michael Walden; Preston Glass	5:27
2.	"Fun 'n' Games"	Walden; Glass; Jeffrey Cohen; Randy Jackson	4:00
3.	"Falling in Love Again"	Eric Kaz; Tom Snow	4:34
4.	"50/50 Love"	Walden; Glass; Cohen	4:54
5.	"Perfect Combination"	Walden; Glass	4:09
6.	"Heartbreak Look"	Walden; Glass	5:33
7.	"Baby It's You" (The Shirelles cover)	Burt Bacharach; Hal David; Mack David; Barney Williams	3:09
8.	"Come Out of the Shadows"	Walden; Glass	5:18
Total length:			36:55

== Personnel ==
- Stacy Lattisaw – lead and backing vocals
- Johnny Gill – lead and backing vocals
- Narada Michael Walden – percussion, drums, keyboards, Simmons drums, computer sequencing, sequencing
- Randy Jackson – bass
- Preston Glass – acoustic guitar, glockenspiel, backing vocals
- Bobby Black – pedal steel, slide guitar
- David Sancious – piano, keyboards
- Frank Martin – synthesizer, keyboards
- Joaquin Lievano, Corrado Rustici – guitar
- Alan Glass – electric guitar
- Marc Russo – saxophone
- Mingo Lewis – percussion
- Vicki Randle, Jim Gilstrap, Bonnie Boyer, Myrna Matthews, Carla Vaughn, Linda Imperial, Kevin Walden, Ben E. Epps, Dennis Saunders, Frank Loverde, Yolanda Glass, Leslie Ann Jones, John Lehman – backing vocals

== Chart positions ==
Chart (1984)	Peak position
US Billboard 200	139
