= Can't Wait Til Tomorrow =

Single by Johnny Gill

from the album Chemistry
- B-side: "Half Crazy"; "Chemistry"; "Because of You"
- Released: 1985
- Genre: R&B
- Length: 4:46 (album version); 4:00 (single edit)
- Label: Cotillion
- Songwriter(s): Barry Alfanzo; Bill Neale; Dennis Matkosky
- Producer(s): Bill Neale; Dennis Matkosky; Linda Creed

Johnny Gill singles chronology
"Half Crazy" (1984)	"Can't Wait Til Tomorrow" (1985)	"Where Do We Go from Here" (1989)

"Can't Wait Til Tomorrow" is a song performed by Johnny Gill, issued as the second and final single from his second studio album Chemistry. The single peaked at #49 on the Billboard R&B chart in 1985.

== Chart positions ==
Chart (1985)	Peak position
US Hot R&B/Hip-Hop Singles & Tracks (Billboard)	49
