= Let's Get the Mood Right =

Studio album by Johnny Gill
- Released: October 8, 1996
- Genre: R&B
- Length: 73:06
- Label: Motown
- Producer: Keith Andes, Big Bub, Jimmy Jam & Terry Lewis, Tony Rich, Joseph Powell, The Characters, Johnny Gill, R. Kelly, Al B. Sure & Kyle West, Kairi Styles

Johnny Gill chronology
Provocative (1993)	Let's Get the Mood Right (1996)	Favorites (1997)

Professional ratings
Review scores
Source	Rating
AllMusic	4/5 stars
USA Today	3.5/4 stars

Let's Get the Mood Right is the fifth album by the American singer Johnny Gill, released in 1996. Certified gold in January 1997, it was his third and final album for Motown Records.

== Track listing ==
Let's Get The Mood Right
No.	Title	Writer(s)	Producer(s)	Length
1.	"Let's Get The Mood Right"	Kenneth "Babyface" Edmonds	Keith Andes	5:14
2.	"Touch"	Frederick "Big Bub" Drakeford; Jefferson; Kenneth Gamble; Leon Huff	Big Bub; Tom Jefferson	4:10
3.	"Maybe"	James Harris III; Terry Lewis; Johnny Gill	Jimmy Jam & Terry Lewis	5:39
4.	"Having Illusions"	Tony Rich	Rich	4:55
5.	"Bring It On"	Rich; Joe Rich	Rich	4:16
6.	"Take Me (I'm Yours)"	Harris III; Lewis; Gill; Joseph Powell; Vanessa Powers	Powell	7:35
7.	"Love In An Elevator"	Carlton Thomas; Troy Taylor; Charles Farrar	The Characters	4:40
8.	"It's Your Body" (featuring Roger Troutman)	Gill	Gill	5:32
9.	"Someone To Love"	R. Kelly	Kelly	3:51
10.	"4 U Alone"	Al B. Sure!; Kyle West	Al B. Sure!; West	5:41
11.	"Love U Right"	Jermaine Dupri; Manuel Seal; Gill	Dupri; Seal (co.)	5:16
12.	"Simply Say I Love U" (featuring Stevie Wonder)	Taylor; Farrar	The Characters	4:30
13.	"I Know You Want Me"	Kairi Styles	Styles; Wayne Styles (co.)	4:03
14.	"So Gentle" (featuring Ronnie DeVoe)	Taylor; Farrar	The Characters	5:07
Total length:				73:06

== Personnel ==
- Nathan East - bass on "Let's Get the Mood Right"
- Babyface, Marc Nelson and Melvin Edmonds - backing vocals on "Let's Get the Mood Right"
- Charles Fearing - guitar on "Let's Get the Mood Right"
- Tony Rich - backing vocals on "Having Illusions" and "Bring It On"
- Nathan Watts - bass overdubs on "It's Your Body"
- R. Kelly - backing vocals on "Someone To Love"
- LeVar "Lil' Tone" Wilson (nka T.L. Cross) of Ladae! - backing vocals on "4 U Alone"
- Stevie Wonder - featured vocals on "Simply Say I Love U"
- Ronnie DeVoe - rap on "So Gentle"

== Charts ==
=== Weekly charts ===
Chart (1996)	Peak position
Australian Albums (ARIA)	146
US Billboard 200	32
US Top R&B/Hip-Hop Albums (Billboard)	7

=== Year-end charts ===
Chart (1997)	Position
US Top R&B/Hip-Hop Albums (Billboard)	73

== Certifications ==
Region	Certification	Certified units/sales
United States (RIAA)	Gold	500,000^{^}
^{^} Shipments figures based on certification alone.
