= My, My, My (Johnny Gill song) =

Single by Johnny Gill

from the album Johnny Gill
- Released: May 16, 1990
- Recorded: 1989
- Genre: R&B; soul; smooth jazz
- Length: 5:21 (album version); 4:05 (single version)
- Label: Motown
- Songwriters: Kenneth Edmonds; Daryl Simmons
- Producers: L.A. Reid; Babyface

Johnny Gill singles chronology
"Rub You the Right Way" (1990)	"My, My, My" (1990)	"Fairweather Friend" (1990)

"My, My, My" is a song by American singer-songwriter Johnny Gill. Released in May 1990 by Motown, as the second single from Gill's second self-titled album (1990), the song, with backing vocals performed by After 7, as well as a jazz solo performed by saxophonist Kenny G, spent two weeks at number-one on the US R&B chart, and made the numbers nine and ten on the US Cash Box Top 100 and Billboard Hot 100 charts. It was also Gill's only song to reach the Adult Contemporary singles chart, where it peaked at No. 32. In 1991 the song won a Soul Train Music Award for Best R&B/Soul Single, Male.

== Charts ==
=== Weekly charts ===
Chart (1990)	Peak position
Australia (ARIA)	122
Canada Top Singles (RPM)	36
Netherlands (Dutch Top 40)	26
Netherlands (Single Top 100)	37
New Zealand (Recorded Music NZ)	31
UK Singles (Official Charts)	89
US Billboard Hot 100	10
US Adult Contemporary (Billboard)	32
US Hot R&B/Hip-Hop Songs (Billboard)	1
US Cash Box Top 100	9

=== Year-end charts ===
Chart (1990)	Position
US Hot R&B/Hip-Hop Songs (Billboard)	8

== Cover versions ==
- In 1990, American saxophonist Gerald Albright covered the song for the album Dream Come True.

== Samples ==
- In 2015, Norwegian DJ and record producer Cashmere Cat and American singer Ariana Grande's song "Adore", which was featured on Cashmere Cat's debut album 9, featured a vocal interpolation of the song.
- In 2020, American rapper Lil Mosey sampled the song on his hit single, "Blueberry Faygo", which was featured on his second album, Certified Hitmaker.

== See also ==
- List of number-one R&B singles of 1990 (U.S.)
