= What You Need (Stacy Lattisaw album) =

1989 studio album by Stacy Lattisaw

Studio album by Stacy Lattisaw
- Released: October 17, 1989
- Recorded: 1989
- Genre: R&B
- Length: 50:41
- Label: Motown
- Producer: Timmy Regisford (exec.)

Stacy Lattisaw chronology
Personal Attention (1988)	What You Need (1989)	The Very Best of Stacy Lattisaw (1998)

Singles from What You Need
- 1. "What You Need" Released: 1989; 2. "Where Do We Go from Here" Released: 1989; 3. "Dance for You" Released: 1989; 4. "I Don't Have the Heart" Released: May 1990

Professional ratings
Review scores
Source	Rating
AllMusic	2/5 stars

What You Need is the tenth and final studio album by American contemporary R&B singer Stacy Lattisaw, released October 17, 1989, via Motown Records. It did not chart on the Billboard 200, but it peaked at #16 on the Billboard R&B chart. It was also Lattisaw's final album before she retired from the music industry.

Four singles were released from the album: "What You Need", "Where Do We Go from Here", "Dance for You" and "I Don't Have the Heart". "Where Do We Go from Here" was the most successful single from the album, peaking at #1 on the Billboard R&B singles chart in 1990.

== Track listing ==
No.	Title	Writer(s)	Producer(s)	Length
1.	"What You Need"	Gordon Williams; Niki Richards	Williams	5:40
2.	"Dance for You"	Kevin Grady; Phillip Damien	Damien	5:44
3.	"You Touched the Woman in Me"	Dana Eaves; Hubert Eaves III	Eaves III	4:10
4.	"R U Man Enuff"	Kenni Hairston; Trevor Gale	Hairston; Gale	5:17
5.	"Guilty (Lock Me Up)"	Cevin Fisher; Angel Valentine	Fisher; Valentine	5:11
6.	"Falling (In Love Again)"	Debbie Cole; Hairston; Gale	Hairston; Gale	4:30
7.	"I Don't Have the Heart"	Alan Rich; Jud Friedman	LeMel Humes	5:00
8.	"Where Do We Go from Here" (featuring Johnny Gill)	LeMel Humes	Humes	5:49
9.	"Tender Love"	Alexandra Brown; Ron Kersey	Brown; Kersey	4:33
10.	"That's the Reason Why I Love"	John Potts; Stacy Lattisaw	Kersey; William Bealle	4:47
Total length:				50:41

Notes

- "What You Need" contains a sample of "The Assembly Line" by Commodores, from their album Machine Gun (1974).

== Charts ==
=== Weekly charts ===
Chart (1989–1990)	Peak position
US Top R&B/Hip-Hop Albums (Billboard)	16

=== Year-end charts ===
Chart (1990)	Position
US Top R&B/Hip-Hop Albums (Billboard)	60
