= Treacle Brown =

Single by Lori Balmer
- B-side: "Four Faces West"
- Released: November 1968
- Recorded: 23 July 1968
- Genre: Art rock, baroque pop
- Length: 2:52
- Label: Polydor
- Songwriter(s): Barry, Robin & Maurice Gibb
- Producer(s): Barry, Robin & Maurice Gibb

"Treacle Brown" is a song written and produced by Barry Gibb, Robin Gibb and Maurice Gibb and was performed by Australian singer Lori Balmer. It was only released in the United Kingdom on Polydor Records.

== Recording ==
It was written by Barry, Robin and Maurice Gibb for the Pippi Longstocking film and was given to Balmer. Instrumental work by the three members of the Bee Gees, they also do the same with "Only One Woman" by The Marbles in 1968. Balmer, who had recorded a single with the Gibb brothers in 1966 moved with her family to England in the start of 1968. She recorded his single "Treacle Brown". It was played by the three Bee Gees members Barry Gibb on rhythm guitar, Maurice Gibb on bass and piano and tickled the ivories. and Colin Petersen on drums with the orchestration of Bill Shepherd, this song was recorded on July 23, 1968 in IBC Studios, London same day as the single's flipside "Four Faces West" and was recorded before the Bee Gees started recording Odessa. Balmer was only 11 years old when they recorded the song. "My contract came unstuck", Balmer revealed "as often happens when lawyers, parents and a child were involved. But, for my part, my affection and gratitude to the whole Gibb family is far-reaching and unwaning. Andy and I remained in contact by letters and phone for quite some time".

== Track listing ==
All songs written and produced by Barry, Robin and Maurice Gibb.

1. "Treacle Brown" - 2:52
2. "Four Faces West" - 1:49

== Cover versions ==
- Anna Marchetti recorded the song in an Italian-language version released the same year.
