= Fairweather Friend =

Single by Johnny Gill

from the album Johnny Gill
- Released: September 26, 1990
- Genre: R&B; new jack swing
- Length: 4:35
- Label: Motown
- Songwriters: Babyface; L.A. Reid; Daryl Simmons
- Producers: L.A. Reid; Babyface

Johnny Gill singles chronology
"My, My, My" (1990)	"Fairweather Friend" (1990)	"Wrap My Body Tight" (1991)

"Fairweather Friend" is a song by American singer Johnny Gill, released in September 1990 by Motown, as the third single from his self-titled debut album (1990). It is written by Babyface, L.A. Reid and Daryl Simmons, and produced by Babyface and Reid. The song peaked at number two on the US Billboard Hot R&B chart, and reached numbers 28 and 31 on the Billboard Hot 100 and Cash Box Top 100 charts.

== Charts ==
=== Weekly charts ===
Weekly chart performance for "Fairweather Friend"
Chart (1990)	Peak position
Australia (ARIA)	142
US Billboard Hot 100	28
US Dance Club Songs (Billboard)	19
US Hot R&B/Hip-Hop Songs (Billboard)	2
US Cash Box Top 100	31

=== Year-end charts ===
Year-end chart performance for "Fairweather Friend"
Chart (1990)	Position
US Hot R&B/Hip-Hop Songs (Billboard)	53
