= The Revival (Tony! Toni! Toné! album) =

Studio album by Tony! Toni! Toné!
- Released: May 8, 1990
- Studios: The Plant (San Francisco); Eve-Jims; Westlake (Los Angeles); Can-Am (Tarzana); Live Oak (Berkeley); J-Jam (Oakland)
- Genres: R&B; funk; soul; new jack swing
- Length: 66:18
- Label: Wing
- Producers: Tony! Toni! Toné!; Foster & McElroy

Tony! Toni! Toné! chronology
Who? (1988)	The Revival (1990)	Sons of Soul (1993)

Singles from The Revival
- 1. "The Blues" Released: March 1990; 2. "Oakland Stroke" Released: May 1990; 3. "Feels Good" Released: June 15, 1990; 4. "It Never Rains (In Southern California)" Released: October 19, 1990; 5. "Whatever You Want" Released: February 13, 1991

The Revival is the second studio album by American R&B band Tony! Toni! Toné!, released on May 8, 1990, by Wing Records. It was produced and arranged primarily by the band, although they were assisted on a few songs by the production duo Foster & McElroy, who had produced their first album, Who? (1988). The band recorded at several studios in California with the assistance of the Synclavier, an early music workstation.

The album features R&B music that draws on funk and older soul influences. Its songs incorporate eccentric sounds and stylistic elements from jazz and hip hop, including improvisational sounds, conversational vocals, and digital samples. The group's lyrics exhibit contemporary hip hop attitudes and traditional soul themes, with songs about unruly women, low-key ballads, and more danceable tracks.

The album was critically well received; reviewers applauded Tony! Toni! Toné!'s songwriting and appropriation of older sounds with contemporary R&B. Commercially, it charted for 64 weeks and peaked at number 34 on the Billboard Top Pop Albums. Four singles were released to promote the album, including the new jack swing hit "Feels Good". The Revival was certified platinum by the Recording Industry Association of America and, according to Nielsen SoundScan, had sold two million copies by 1992.

== Recording ==
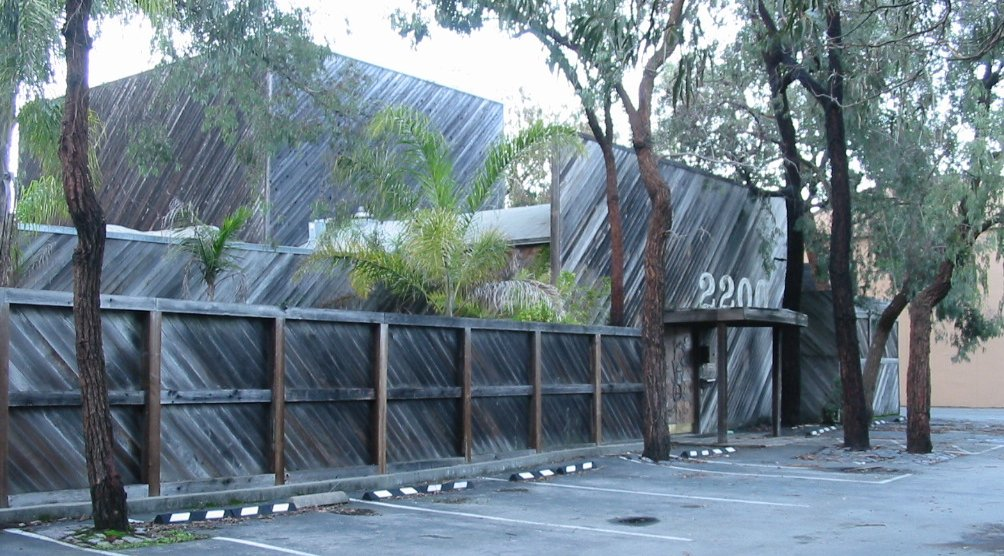
The Plant in Sausalito

The Revival is the follow-up to Tony! Toni! Toné!'s 1988 debut album Who?, which was a modest success for the group and acquainted them with production and songwriting team Foster & McElroy. Originally friends from Oakland, the band moved to Sacramento after finishing Who? with Foster & McElroy and began to record The Revival.

Recording sessions for the album took place at several studios in California—The Plant in Sausalito, Eve-Jims Studio and Westlake Recording Studios in Los Angeles, Can-Am Studio in Tarzana, Live Oak Studio in Berkeley, and J-Jam Studio in Oakland. Tony! Toni! Toné! used the Synclavier, an early music workstation, to record the album.

The band primarily produced and arranged The Revival, with additional production by Foster & McElroy for a few songs. They also worked with engineers Toby Wright and Gerry Brown, musician Keith Crouch, and singer Vanessa Williams, who sang on "Oakland Stroke".

== Music and lyrics ==
The Revival features R&B music with elements from hip hop, funk, jazz, and pop styles. Musically and lyrically, it fuses older soul influences and contemporary hip hop attitudes, along with the latter genre's use of samples and digital rhythm tracks. Funk songs such as "The Blues", "Oakland Stroke", "Let's Have a Good Time", and "Feels Good" incorporate digital production technology. Janine McAdams of Spin finds most of the songs to be "embellished with an allusion, an imitation or an out-and-out sample", and writes that the group draws on "various musical influences—Parliament, Duke Ellington, Pointer Sisters, James Brown, among others." "Let's Have a Good Time" samples the Pointer Sisters' 1973 song "Yes We Can Can", and "Oakland Stroke", a paean to the group's hometown, has "Jungle Boogie"-like horn riffs. The "sardonic" song veers stylistically from hip hop to swing, incorporating a 1940s jazz break.

"Feels Good"
The song has a high dance tempo (118 bpm) and jubilant tone. It is described by one writer as "a statement of the gently crushing rhythm of passion".

According to McAdams, Tony! Toni! Toné!'s songwriting on The Revival disregarded "social commentary or political posturing" in favor of "the preservation of R&B's signature, the perpetuation of the soul tradition, and—on the lighter side—the glorification of barbeque, the boogaloo and the booty on a Saturday night." Described by the group as "Baptist shout music that makes you wanna dance", "Feels Good" incorporates a popular sample from James Brown's 1970 song "Funky Drummer" and gospel musical themes. "Don't Talk About Me" is a warning to a mouthy woman, while "The Blues" features the narrator's spiteful complaints about an ungrateful girlfriend. The latter song features aggressive bass, a funky break, doo-wop verses, a blues riff that the group's guitarist D'wayne Wiggins learned from his father, and ideas from pianist Vince Guaraldi's music for Peanuts television specials.

The album's songs also feature offbeat sounds, improvisational elements, and conversational vocals derived from rap. The Revival begins with a directive from a grave voice: "Play this record as frequently as possible, Then, as it becomes easier for you, play the record once a day, or as needed." The album also features dialogue between an old lady who asks the group whether it will be like their last album, on which she was also featured; they respond to her question "No, ma'am". "All the Way" has a scrambling beat, whistle sounds, and the rhythmic call and response "What are we, what are we, what are we? ... Just a bunch of brothers having a party". The end of "Feels Good" features witty jazz keyboard playing behind a lively voice saying "it feels good ... in the hands, feet, bones, heart, and soul". Ed Hogan of Allmusic writes that "the last part sounds like a Sunday morning testimonial."

After the first five songs, The Revival features songs at a calmer tempo and more conventional style, with ballads that are more relaxed and low-key. "It Never Rains (In Southern California)" was titled after an oft-repeated phrase from one of Tony! Toni! Toné!'s attorneys, who used it in response to the group wearing heavy coats after returning from visits on the East Coast. Group drummer Timothy Christian played most of the song's instruments, and bassist Raphael Wiggins wrote its lyrics about a man longing for a woman who was in southern California. The ballads are followed by "Those Were the Days", which features jouncing banjo, trumpet, and wistful lyrics reminiscing about simpler times "when a dollar was worth a dollar, and you didn't have to carry a gun when you left your house."

== Release and sales ==
The album was released on May 8, 1990, by Wing Records. It charted for 64 weeks on the Billboard Top Pop Albums, peaking at number 34 on the chart. The album's second single "Feels Good" was released on June 19 and certified gold on November 13 after it had shipped 500,000 copies. The single topped the R&B chart for two weeks and reached number nine on the Billboard Hot 100 in the fall of 1990, going on to sell over one million copies. In late 1990, the album's third single "It Never Rains (In Southern California)" became a number-one R&B hit and also peaked at number 34 on the Hot 100.

On January 28, 1991, The Revival was certified platinum by the Recording Industry Association of America (RIAA), for shipments of one million copies in the United States. By 1992, it had sold two million copies, according to Nielsen SoundScan, which began tracking sales data in 1991.

== Critical reception ==
Professional ratings
Review scores
Source	Rating
AllMusic	5/5 stars
Chicago Tribune	3/4 stars
Christgau's Consumer Guide	(2-star Honorable Mention)
Encyclopedia of Popular Music	3/5 stars
Entertainment Weekly	A−
Los Angeles Times	3/4 stars
Orlando Sentinel	4/5 stars
The Rolling Stone Album Guide	3/5 stars
Select	2/5

Reviewing the album for the Chicago Tribune in 1990, Greg Kot wrote that The Revival's "lull" adult contemporary ballads were redeemed by songs with "Sly Stone, Ray Charles, doo-wop and Motown influences". With its addition of "loopy humor", the album was rendered "a terrific '60s-meets-the-'90s recipe", in his opinion. In Entertainment Weekly, Greg Sandow applauded the band for "building momentum by adding new elements as the songs proceed" and "setting the course for whatever future the [R&B] genre is likely to have". Dennis Hunt of the Los Angeles Times said although their "offbeat R&B hybrids" are occasionally "too busy and intentionally oddball", "the Tonys' explorations ... are mostly successful". Orlando Sentinel writer Parry Gettelman said the dance-oriented tracks "have great grooves and a warmth, humor and vocal finesse sadly lacking in the Top 40", while Geoffrey Himes from The Washington Post viewed the album as a promising debut with "perfect party music". Janine McAdams from Spin said the band "transformed the simplest ditties into jammin' anthems that assault the ear and move the feet"; she continued to say:

Revival works as evidence of the wide-ranging continuum of R&B, the ability of sterling soul to remain fresh for the new generation. The Tonyies pull off the feat without obscuring their unique voice. Maybe some will be jolted by their barrage of remember-when musical references on Revival, but to the youthful crowd it's aimed at, much of this is brand-new.

In retrospect, The Revival was viewed by Yahoo! Music's Scott Wilson as Tony! Toni! Toné!'s "breakthrough" because of how its series of hit singles and the group's exceptional songwriting and production "assured them their place in the musical hierarchy". AllMusic editor Alex Henderson said the group "managed to appeal to urban contemporary audiences while expressing a love of 1970s soul and funk" with artistic merit and distinction from the largely unambitious R&B records released in 1990. In the opinion of Jason Heller from The A.V. Club, The Revival was the "masterpiece" of the new jack swing subgenre, "an artistic triumph in a genre that generally coasted on impeccable craft". Sam Chennault from Rhapsody felt in spite of its new jack swing hit "Feels Good", most of the album embraced "Bay Area funk and hinted at the subsequent innovations of key member Raphael Saadiq". Robert Christgau was somewhat less enthusiastic and gave it a two-star honorable mention, indicating a "likable effort consumers attuned to its overriding aesthetic or individual vision may well enjoy". He singled out "Feels Good" and "Oakland Stroke" as highlights while summarizing Tony! Toni! Toné!'s performance as that of "a love band" that plays funk music.

== Track listing ==
No.	Title	Writer(s)	Producer(s)	Length
1.	"Feels Good" (Featuring Mopreme Shakur)	Tim Christian, Carl Wheeler, Dwayne Wiggins, Ray Wiggins, Maurice Shakur.	Tony! Toni! Toné!	4:56
2.	"All the Way"	Christian, Wheeler, D. Wiggins, R. Wiggins	Tony! Toni! Toné!	4:26
3.	"Oakland Stroke" (featuring Vanessa Williams)	Christian, Wheeler, D. Wiggins, R. Wiggins	Tony! Toni! Toné!	4:39
4.	"The Blues"	Christian, Wheeler, D. Wiggins, R. Wiggins	Tony! Toni! Toné!	4:10
5.	"Let's Have a Good Time"	Denzil Foster, Thomas McElroy	Foster & McElroy	4:01
6.	"It Never Rains (In Southern California)"	Christian, Wheeler, D. Wiggins, R. Wiggins	Tony! Toni! Toné!	5:00
7.	"Whatever You Want"	Christian, Wheeler, D. Wiggins, R. Wiggins	Tony! Toni! Toné!	4:48
8.	"I Care"	Christian, Wheeler, D. Wiggins, R. Wiggins	Tony! Toni! Toné!	5:55
9.	"Sky's the Limit"	Christian, Wheeler, D. Wiggins, R. Wiggins	Tony! Toni! Toné!	4:35
10.	"All My Love"	Christian, Wheeler, D. Wiggins, R. Wiggins	Tony! Toni! Toné!	5:58
11.	"Don't Talk About Me"	Foster, McElroy, Susan Verdejo	Foster & McElroy	4:14
12.	"Skin Tight"	Foster, McElroy	Foster & McElroy	3:59
13.	"Jo-Jo"	Christian, Wheeler, D. Wiggins, R. Wiggins	Tony! Toni! Toné!	4:12
14.	"Those Were the Days"	Wheeler, D. Wiggins, R. Wiggins, M. Shakur, E. Baker	Tony! Toni! Toné!	4:58

== Personnel ==
Credits are adapted from Allmusic.

=== Tony! Toni! Toné! ===
- Timothy Christian Riley – drums
- D'Wayne Wiggins – guitar, vocals
- Raphael Wiggins – bass, vocals
- Carl Wheeler – keyboards, vocals
- Elijah Baker – bass, vocals
- Antron Haile – synthesizer

=== Additional personnel ===
- Eric Baker – rhythm guitar
- Gerry Brown – engineer, mixing
- Joe Capers – engineer
- Keith Crouch – synthesizer, bass
- Ed Eckstine – executive producer
- Dale Everingham – engineer
- Denzil Foster – arranger, producer
- Arne Frager – engineer
- Jim Gardiner – engineer
- Fred Howard – engineer
- Ken Kessie – engineer, mixing
- Kelle Kutsugeras – creative director
- LA B Company – artwork, design
- L.A. Jae – turntables
- Dean Landew – composer
- Bonnie Lewis – photography
- Bill Malina – engineer
- Thomas McElroy – arranger, producer
- Jeff Poe – engineer
- Herb Powers – mastering
- Tony! Toni! Toné! – arranger, producer, vocals
- Rob Von Arx – post production
- Vanessa Williams – performer, vibraphone, vocals
- Toby Wright – engineer

== Charts ==
=== Weekly charts ===
Chart (1990)	Peak position
Australian Albums (ARIA)	149
US Billboard 200	34
US Top R&B/Hip-Hop Albums (Billboard)	4

=== Year-end charts ===
Chart (1990)	Position
US Billboard 200	85
US Top R&B/Hip-Hop Albums (Billboard)	14
Chart (1991)	Position
US Billboard 200	84
US Top R&B/Hip-Hop Albums (Billboard)	10

=== Singles ===
Year	Song	Chart	Peak position
1990	"The Blues"	US Billboard Hot 100	46
1990	"The Blues"	US Billboard Hot Black Singles	1
1990	"The Blues"	US Billboard Hot Dance Club Play	43
1990	"Oakland Stroke"	UK Singles Chart	50
1990	"Feels Good"	US Billboard Hot 100	9
1990	"Feels Good"	US Billboard Hot Black Singles	1
1990	"It Never Rains (In Southern California)"	US Billboard Hot R&B Singles	1
1991	"It Never Rains (In Southern California)"	UK Singles Chart	69
1991	"It Never Rains (In Southern California)"	US Billboard Hot 100	34
1991	"Whatever You Want"	US Billboard Hot 100	48
1991	"Whatever You Want"	US Billboard Hot R&B Singles	1

== Bibliography ==
- Brusca, Donny (2006). BPM List 2006: Main Edition. Lulu.com. ISBN 1-84728-860-X.
- Bourgoin, Suzanne; LaBlanc, Michael L. (1994). Contemporary Musicians: Profiles of the People in Music. Vol. 12. Farmington Hills, Michigan: Gale Research. ISBN 0-8103-8553-8.
- Schuers, Fred; et al. (November 2, 2004). Brackett, Nathan; Hoard, Christian (eds.). The New Rolling Stone Album Guide (4th ed.). Simon & Schuster. ISBN 0-7432-0169-8.
