= Rub You the Right Way =

1990 single by Johnny Gill

Single by Johnny Gill

from the album Johnny Gill
- Released: March 28, 1990
- Studio: Flyte Tyme (Edina, Minnesota)
- Genre: New jack swing
- Length: 5:31 (album version); 4:07 (single version)
- Label: Motown
- Songwriter: James Harris III & Terry Lewis
- Producers: Jimmy Jam and Terry Lewis (album version); DJ Eddie F, Dave "Jam" Hall, Pete Rock (remix)

Johnny Gill singles chronology
"Where Do We Go from Here" (1989)	"Rub You the Right Way" (1990)	"My, My, My" (1990)

"Rub You the Right Way" is a song by American singer Johnny Gill, issued in March 1990 as the first single from his self-titled third album (1990). The single was written and produced by James Harris III & Terry Lewis. A remixed version of the song exists with a rap verse from CL Smooth.

== Composition ==
According to Billboard magazine, the song is about sex, more specifically a "man who offers to use his hands wisely during a night of lovin'."

== Chart performance ==
"Rub You the Right Way" spent one week at number one on the US Billboard Hot Black Singles chart and reached numbers three and four on the Billboard Hot 100 and Cash Box Top 100. The single also peaked at number 16 on the Billboard Dance Club Play chart.

== Charts ==
=== Weekly charts ===
Chart (1990)	Peak position
Australia (ARIA)	59
Canada Top Singles (RPM)	27
Canada Dance/Urban (RPM)	4
Netherlands (Dutch Top 40)	26
Netherlands (Single Top 100)	27
New Zealand (Recorded Music NZ)	41
UK Singles (Official Charts)	77
US Billboard Hot 100	3
US 12-inch Singles Sales (Billboard)	6
US Dance Club Play (Billboard)	16
US Hot Black Singles (Billboard)	1
US Cash Box Top 100	4

=== Year-end charts ===
Chart (1990)	Position
US Billboard Hot 100	23
US 12-inch Singles Sales (Billboard)	40
US Hot R&B Singles (Billboard)	17
US Cash Box Top 100	49

== Certifications ==
Region	Certification	Certified units/sales
United States (RIAA)	Gold	500,000^{^}
^{^} Shipments figures based on certification alone.

== Release history ==
Region	Date	Format(s)	Label(s)	Ref.
United States	March 28, 1990	—N/a	Motown	
United Kingdom	June 4, 1990	7-inch vinyl; 12-inch vinyl; CD	Motown	
Australia	June 25, 1990	7-inch vinyl; 12-inch vinyl; cassette	Motown	

== See also ==
- R&B number-one hits of 1990 (USA)
