= Preston Glass =

American songwriter and producer

- Born: January 9, 1960 (age 66); California
- Website: thrillentertainmentgroup.com

Preston Glass (born January 9, 1960) is an American musician, songwriter and producer. Glass is the winner of six BMI Awards. He has also worked with several famous artists such as Aretha Franklin, Whitney Houston, Diana Ross, Kenny G, Natalie Cole and Earth, Wind & Fire.

== Career ==
Glass started off his career in music during the late seventies as a staff writer for Philadelphia producer Thom Bell. He eventually began working alongside Narada Michael Walden.

Glass played on Aretha Franklin's 1980 album Aretha and Stacy Lattisaw's 1981 LP Sixteen. He later produced Johnny Gill and Stacy Lattisaw on their 1984 LP Perfect Combination and played on Teena Marie's 1984 album Starchild. Glass also performed on Patti Austin's 1984 self titled album, Aretha Franklin 1985 LP Who's Zoomin' Who? and Whitney Houston's 1985 self titled album. He then produced Kenny G on his 1986 LP Duotones and George Benson on his 1986 album While the City Sleeps....

As well Glass performed on Stacy Lattisaw's 1986 LP Take Me All the Way, Aretha Franklin's 1986 album Aretha and Whitney Houston's 1987 LP Whitney. He later worked with Earth, Wind & Fire on their 1987 album Touch the World and Jennifer Holliday on her 1987 LP Get Close to My Love. Glass then produced George Benson on his 1988 LP Twice the Love, Kenny G on his 1988 LP Silhouette and George Howard on his 1989 album Personal. He also composed on Diana Ross' 1989 LP Workin' Overtime and Natalie Cole's 1989 album Good to Be Back. Glass later produced Warren Hill on his 1991 LP Kiss Under the Moon, performed on Tevin Campbell's 1993 album I'm Ready and produced Kirk Whalum on his 1993 album Cache.

== Personal life ==
Glass has taught as a professor at San Diego State University and UCLA.

== Discography ==
- Street Corner Prophecy (2006)
- Music as Medicine (2008)
- The Stuff That Matters
- Colors of Life
- Preston Glass Presents Love And Compassion Vol 3
