= Feels Good =

Single by Tony! Toni! Toné!

from the album The Revival
- Released: 1990
- Recorded: 1989
- Genre: New jack swing
- Length: 4:58
- Label: Wing
- Songwriters: Raphael Saadiq; D'Wayne Wiggins; Timothy Clemon Riley; Carl Wheeler
- Producer: Tony! Toni! Toné!

Tony! Toni! Toné! singles chronology
"The Blues" (1990)	"Feels Good" (1990)	"It Never Rains (In Southern California)" (1990)

"Feels Good" is a number-one R&B single by Tony! Toni! Toné! featuring a rap verse by Mopreme Shakur. The hit song spent two weeks at number 1 on the U.S. R&B chart, and it peaked at number 9 on the U.S. Billboard Hot 100. "Feels Good" also peaked at number 3 on the dance charts.

== Track listings ==
US cassette single

- A1 Feels Good [12" Party Mix] 8:30
- B1 Previews: Oakland Stroke / It Never Rains (In Southern California) / The Blues 1:30
- B2 Feels Good [Instrumental] 5:20

US 12-inch single

Side 1:

1. Feels Good [Edit] 4:31
2. Feels Good [LP Version] 4:53
3. Feels Good [12" Party Mix] 8:27

Side 2:

1. Feels Good [Extended Version] 6:56

US Maxi-CD

1. Feels Good [Radio Version] 4:33
2. Feels Good [LP Version] 4:56
3. Feels Good [12" Party Mix] 8:30
4. Feels Good [Extended Mix] 6:56

== Charts ==
=== Weekly charts ===
Chart (1990)	Peak position
Australia (ARIA)	89
New Zealand (Recorded Music NZ)	8
UK Singles (Official Charts)	85
US Billboard Hot 100	9

=== Year-end charts ===
Chart (1991)	Position
New Zealand (Record Music NZ)	46

== See also ==
- List of Hot R&B Singles number ones of 1990
