= Johnny Gill (1990 album) =

Studio album by Johnny Gill
- Released: April 17, 1990
- Recorded: September 1989 – February 1990
- Genres: R&B; new jack swing
- Length: 48:35
- Label: Motown
- Producers: Jimmy Jam and Terry Lewis; L.A. & Babyface; Nat Adderley, Jr.

Johnny Gill chronology
Chemistry (1985)	Johnny Gill (1990)	Provocative (1993)

Singles from Johnny Gill
- 1. "Rub You the Right Way" Released: March 13, 1990; 2. "My, My, My" Released: May 16, 1990; 3. "Fairweather Friend" Released: September 26, 1990; 4. "Wrap My Body Tight" Released: February 5, 1991

Johnny Gill is the third album by American singer Johnny Gill, released in April 1990, and his first for Motown Records. The album produced four hit singles: "Rub You the Right Way," "My, My, My," "Wrap My Body Tight" and "Fairweather Friend". It was recorded with the label during the hiatus of Gill's group New Edition. The album sold over 4 million copies worldwide. Before joining New Edition for their Heart Break album in 1988, Gill had already recorded two songs for the album―"Just Another Lonely Night" and "Feels So Much Better". By February 1991, the album had already sold approximately 2,050,000 copies in the United States and 50,000 in Canada, making the album 2× platinum in the United States at the time.

== Critical reception ==
Professional ratings
Review scores
Source	Rating
AllMusic	5/5 stars

In a review for AllMusic, Jason Birchmeier opined that "Motown's visionary teaming of" Gill with production duos Jimmy Jam and Terry Lewis and L.A. Reid and Babyface "at their respective primes culminated in a set of wonderful songs". He singled out "chief among them" "Rub You the Right Way" (a Jam & Lewis production), which he described as "one of the definitive new jack swing anthems of the era", and "My, My, My" (L.A. & Babyface)" as "reprising many of the same qualities that had made Babyface's own "Whip Appeal" single such an across-the-board chart-topper only a year earlier." Birchmeier went on to say that "the remainder of the album still had more than its fair share of highlights", describing "Feels So Much Better" and "Giving My All to You" as "excellent album tracks". He concluded the review by saying that the album is "in a sense, [Gill's] ultimate legacy. And a fine legacy it is, indeed."

== Track listing ==
No.	Title	Writer(s)	Producer(s)	Length
1.	"Rub You the Right Way"	James Harris III; Terry Lewis	Jimmy Jam & Terry Lewis	5:30
2.	"Fairweather Friend"	Kenneth "Babyface" Edmonds; Antonio "L.A." Reid; Daryl Simmons	Reid; Edmonds; Simmons (co.); Kevin "Kayo" Roberson (co.)	4:35
3.	"Wrap My Body Tight"	Harris III; Lewis	Jimmy Jam & Terry Lewis	4:38
4.	"Feels So Much Better"	Edmonds	Reid; Edmonds; Perri "Pebbles" Reid (co.)	4:36
5.	"Never Know Love"	Edmonds; Reid	Edmonds; Reid	4:26
6.	"My, My, My"	Edmonds; Simmons	Reid; Edmonds; Simmons (co.); Roberson (co.)	5:21
7.	"Lady Dujour"	H. Randall Davis	Jimmy Jam & Terry Lewis; Randy Ran (co.)	4:57
8.	"Just Another Lonely Night"	Tony Wells; Dianne Quander	Nat Adderley, Jr.; Cirocco (co.); Zack Vaz (co.)	4:10
9.	"Giving My All to You"	Davis	Randy Ran; Jimmy Jam & Terry Lewis (co.)	5:19
10.	"Let's Spend the Night"	Davis; Harris III; Lewis	Jimmy Jam & Terry Lewis; Randy Ran (co.)	3:56
11.	"My, My, My" (Reprise)			1:11

Notes

- (co.) – signifies as co-producer

== Personnel ==
Adapted from the album's liner notes.

=== Musicians ===
- Johnny Gill – lead vocals (all tracks), backing vocals (tracks 1–6, 9, 10), percussion (track 3)
- Jimmy Jam – rhythm arrangements (tracks 1, 3), vocal arrangements (tracks 1, 3, 7), keyboards (tracks 1, 3, 9, 10), percussion (tracks 1, 3, 7, 9, 10), drum & keyboard programming (tracks 1, 3),
- Terry Lewis – rhythm arrangements (tracks 1, 3), vocal arrangements (tracks 1, 3, 7, 9, 10), background vocals (tracks 1, 3), percussion (tracks 1, 3, 7, 9, 10)
- After 7 – backing vocals (track 6)
- Babyface – keyboards (tracks 2, 4, 5, 6)
- Linda Brown – backing vocals (track 8)
- Cirocco – backing vocals arrangement (track 8) Fender Rhodes (track 8), additional percussive sounds (track 8)
- Jim Demgen – keyboards (track 7)
- Lance Ellington – backing vocals (track 3)
- Kenny G – saxophone (track 6)
- Luico Hopper – bass (track 8)
- Kayo – bass (tracks 2, 4–6)
- Steve Kroon – percussion (track 8)
- O'Jania – backing vocals (track 8)
- Pebbles – backing vocals (track 4)
- Randy Ran – rhythm arrangement (tracks 7, 9, 10), vocal arrangements (tracks 9, 10), keyboards (tracks 7, 9, 10), drum & keyboard programming (tracks 7, 9, 10), backing vocals (tracks 9, 10)
- L.A. Reid – drums & percussion (tracks 2, 4–6)
- Daryl Simmons – backing vocals (tracks 2, 4)
- Tony Tolbert – backing vocals
- Georg Wadenius – guitar (track 8)
- The Waters Sisters (Julia Waters & Maxine Waters) – backing vocals (track 8)
- Karyn White – backing vocals (tracks 2, 4)
- Buddy Williams – drums (track 8), percussion

=== Technical ===
- Jimmy Jam and Terry Lewis – producer (tracks 1, 3, 7, 10), co-producer (track 9), executive producer
- L.A. Reid – producer & mixing (tracks 2, 4–6), executive producer
- Babyface – producer (tracks 2, 4–6), executive producer
- Randy Ran – producer (tracks 7, 9, 10)
- Nat Adderley Jr. – producer (track 8)
- Kayo – co-producer (tracks 2, 6)
- Daryl Simmons – co-producer (tracks 2, 6)
- Pebbles – co-producer (track 4)
- Cirocco – additional producer (track 8)
- Zack Vaz – additional producer (track 8), mixing (track 8)
- Jheryl Busby – executive producer
- Michael Alvord – assistant engineer (tracks 2, 5)
- Jim Dutt – recording (tracks 2, 5)
- Brian Gardner – mastering
- Jon Gass – recording (tracks 2, 4, 5, 6), mixing (tracks 4, 5, 6), mixing engineer (tracks 2, 4, 5, 6)
- Steve Hodge – recording & mixing (tracks 1, 3, 7, 9, 10)
- Peter McCabe – assistant mix engineer (track 8)
- Susan Owens – production coordination
- Louis Padgett – recording (track 6)
- John Payne – assistant engineer (track 4)
- Tally Sherwood – assistant mix engineer (track 8)
- Zetra Smith – production coordination
- Donnell Sullivan – assistant mixing engineer (tracks 2, 4, 5, 6), assistant engineer (tracks 5, 6)
- John Van Nest – mix engineer (track 8)

Album artwork

- Steve Meltzer – art direction
- Beth Yenni – design
- Chris Cuffaro – photography
- Rhett Collier – stylist
- Keith Holman – clothing designer
- Tara Posey – makeup
- James "J.T." Taylor – hair

== Charts ==
=== Weekly charts ===
Weekly chart performance for Johnny Gill
Chart (1990)	Peak position
Australian Albums (ARIA)	110
Canada Top Albums/CDs (RPM)	29
Dutch Albums (Album Top 100)	73
New Zealand Albums (RMNZ)	47
US Billboard 200	8
US Top R&B/Hip-Hop Albums (Billboard)	1

=== Year-end charts ===
Year-end chart performance for Johnny Gill
Chart (1990)	Position
US Billboard 200	29
US Top R&B/Hip-Hop Albums (Billboard)	9
Chart (1991)	Position
US Top R&B/Hip-Hop Albums (Billboard)	29

== Certifications ==
Region	Certification	Certified units/sales
Canada (Music Canada)	Gold	50,000^{^}
United States (RIAA)	2× Platinum	2,000,000^{^}
^{^} Shipments figures based on certification alone.

== See also ==
- List of number-one R&B albums of 1990 (U.S.)
