= Where Do We Go from Here (Stacy Lattisaw song) =

Single by Stacy Lattisaw featuring Johnny Gill

from the album What You Need
- Released: 1989
- Genre: R&B
- Length: 6:05 (album version); 4:12 (single edit)
- Label: Motown
- Songwriter(s): LeMel Humes
- Producer(s): LeMel Humes

Stacy Lattisaw singles chronology
"What You Need" (1989)	"Where Do We Go from Here" (1989)	"Dance for You" (1989)

Johnny Gill singles chronology
"Can't Wait Til Tomorrow" (1985)	"Where Do We Go from Here" (1989)	"Rub You the Right Way" (1990)

"Where Do We Go from Here" is a song performed by American contemporary R&B singer Stacy Lattisaw, issued as the second single from her ninth studio album What You Need. The song features vocals from frequent collaborator Johnny Gill. Released in 1989, it peaked at #1 for two weeks on the Billboard R&B chart in 1990.

== Chart positions ==
Chart (1990)	Peak position
US Hot Dance Music/Maxi-Singles Sales (Billboard)	20
US Hot R&B/Hip-Hop Singles & Tracks (Billboard)	1
