= Stacy Lattisaw =

American singer (born 1966)

- Born: November 25, 1966 (age 59); Washington, D.C., U.S.
- Genres: R&B; soul; dance-pop; freestyle; gospel
- Occupation: Singer
- Instrument: Vocals
- Years active: 1979–1992
- Labels: Cotillion/Atlantic (1979–1985); Motown/MCA (1986–1992)
- Spouse: Kevin Jackson (m. 1992)

Stacy Lattisaw Jackson (née Lattisaw; born November 25, 1966) is an American R&B singer from Washington, D.C..

== Career ==
When she was 11 years old, singer/songwriter Frederick Knight attempted to sign Lattisaw to his production company, writing the song "Ring My Bell" for her as a teenybopper song about kids talking on the telephone. When Lattisaw signed with a different label, Anita Ward was asked to sing it instead (with some rewriting), and it became Ward's hit.

Lattisaw recorded her first album for Cotillion Records at the age of 12 in 1979, under the direction of record producer Van McCoy. However, it was not until she became affiliated with Narada Michael Walden, a former drummer with the Mahavishnu Orchestra who was just beginning a career as a producer, that she found larger success. Under Walden's direction, she released several R&B hit albums between 1981 and 1986.

During the 1980s and early 1990s, Lattisaw had several US R&B hit singles, and a 1980 top 3 hit in the UK with her song "Jump to the Beat". She had three moderate hits on the US Hot 100 chart; "Let Me Be Your Angel" (No. 21), "Love on a Two-Way Street" (No. 26), and "Miracles" (No. 40). She signed with Motown in 1986. She scored her only No. 1 R&B hit with duet partner Johnny Gill, titled "Where Do We Go from Here", in 1989. She retired from pop music in 1992 to concentrate on being a mother in her family, although she performed gospel music in the years since. Lattisaw's last recorded appearance in secular music was singing background vocals on the 1994 Tanya Blount single "Through the Rain". In 2010, her music career was chronicled on the TV One docu-series Unsung, in which she also appeared.

In 1981, she was the opening act on the Jacksons's Triumph Tour.

== Discography ==
=== Studio albums ===
Year	Album	Peak chart positions		Record label
Year	Album	US	US R&B	Record label
1979	Young and in Love	—	—	Cotillion Records
1980	Let Me Be Your Angel	44	9	Cotillion Records
1981	With You	46	8	Cotillion Records
1982	Sneakin' Out	55	11	Cotillion Records
1983	Sixteen	160	26	Cotillion Records
1984	Perfect Combination (with Johnny Gill)	139	27	Cotillion Records
1985	I'm Not the Same Girl	—	—	Cotillion Records
1986	Take Me All the Way	131	36	Motown
1988	Personal Attention	153	24	Motown
1989	What You Need	—	16	Motown
"—" denotes the album failed to chart

=== Compilation albums ===
- The Very Best of Stacy Lattisaw (1998, Rhino Entertainment)
- Stacey Lattisaw - The Cotillion Years 1979 - 1985 (2021, Robinsongs)

=== Singles ===
Year	Title	Peak chart positions						Album
Year	Title	US	US R&B	US Dan	US A/C	UK	IRL	Album
1979	"When You're Young and in Love"	—	91	—	—	—	—	Young and in Love
1980	"Dynamite!"	—	8	1	—	51	—	Let Me Be Your Angel
1980	"Jump to the Beat"	—	—	1	—	3	11	Let Me Be Your Angel
1980	"Let Me Be Your Angel"	21	8	—	34	—	—	Let Me Be Your Angel
1981	"Love on a Two Way Street"	26	2	—	19	—	—	With You
1981	"It Was So Easy"	—	61	—	—	—	—	With You
1981	"Feel My Love Tonight"	—	71	36	—	—	—	With You
1982	"Don't Throw It All Away"	101	9	—	—	—	—	Sneakin' Out
1982	"Attack of the Name Game"	70	14	—	—	—	—	Sneakin' Out
1982	"Hey There Lonely Boy"	108	71	—	—	—	—	Sneakin' Out
1983	"Miracles"	40	13	—	—	—	—	Sixteen
1983	"Million Dollar Babe"	—	52	—	—	—	—	Sixteen
1984	"Perfect Combination" (with Johnny Gill)	75	10	—	—	—	—	Perfect Combination
1984	"Baby It's You" (with Johnny Gill)	102	37	—	—	—	—	Perfect Combination
1984	"Block Party" (with Johnny Gill)	—	63	48	—	—	—	Perfect Combination
1985	"I'm Not the Same Girl"	—	52	—	—	—	—	I'm Not the Same Girl
1985	"He's Just Not You"	—	—	—	—	—	—	I'm Not the Same Girl
1985	"Can't Stop Thinking About You"	—	—	—	—	—	—	I'm Not the Same Girl
1986	"Nail It to the Wall"	48	4	2	—	76	—	Take Me All the Way
1987	"Jump into My Life"	—	13	3	—	79	—	Take Me All the Way
1987	"Every Drop of Your Love"	—	8	—	—	—	—	Personal Attention
1988	"Let Me Take You Down"	—	11	—	—	—	—	Personal Attention
1988	"Call Me"	—	80	—	—	105	—	Personal Attention
1989	"What You Need"	—	30	—	—	—	—	What You Need
1989	"Where Do We Go from Here" (featuring Johnny Gill)	—	1	20	—	—	—	What You Need
1989	"Dance for You" (featuring Johnny Gill)	—	—	—	—	—	—	What You Need
1990	"I Don't Have the Heart"	—	—	—	—	—	—	What You Need
"—" denotes the single failed to chart

== See also ==
- List of disco artists (S–Z)
- List of artists who reached number one on the U.S. Dance Club Songs chart
- List of people from Washington, D.C.
- List of artists who reached number one on the Billboard R&B chart
- List of number-one dance singles of 1980 (U.S.)
- List of number-one R&B singles of 1990 (U.S.)
- American Music Awards of 1982
