= Tony! Toni! Toné! discography =

The following is the discography of American soul/R&B group Tony! Toni! Toné!.

== Albums ==
=== Studio albums ===
List of studio albums, with selected details and peak positions
Title	Album details	Peak chart positions					Certifications
Title	Album details	US	US R&B	AUS	CAN	UK	Certifications
Who?	Release date: April 18, 1988; Label: Wing	69	14	—	—	—	RIAA: Gold
The Revival	Release date: May 8, 1990; Label: Wing	34	4	149	—	—	RIAA: Platinum
Sons of Soul	Release date: June 22, 1993; Label: Wing, Mercury	24	3	68	70	66	RIAA: 2× Platinum
House of Music	Release date: November 19, 1996; Label: Mercury	32	10	—	—	—	RIAA: Platinum
"—" denotes a recording that did not chart or was not released in that territory.

=== Compilation albums ===
List of compilation albums, with selected details and peak positions
Title	Album details	Peak positions
Title	Album details	US R&B
Hits	Release date: November 4, 1997; Label: Mercury	54
20th Century Masters – The Millennium Collection: The Best of Tony! Toni! Toné!	Release date: August 14, 2001; Label: Motown	—
Icon	Release date: March 1, 2011; Label: Mercury	—
"—" denotes a recording that did not chart or was not released in that territory.

== Singles ==
=== As lead artist ===
Year	Single	Peak chart positions										Certifications	Album
Year	Single	US	US R&B	US Dan	AUS	CAN	FRA	GER	NLD	NZ	UK	Certifications	Album
1988	"Little Walter"	47	1	43	—	—	—	—	—	—	182		Who?
1988	"Born Not to Know"	—	4	—	—	—	—	—	—	—	—		Who?
1988	"Baby Doll"	—	5	44	—	—	—	—	—	—	—		Who?
1989	"For the Love of You"	—	6	—	—	—	—	—	—	—	—		Who?
1990	"The Blues"	46	1	43	—	—	—	—	—	23	92		The Revival
1990	"Feels Good"	9	1	3	89	68	—	—	—	8	85	RIAA: Gold	The Revival
1990	"Oakland Stroke"	—	—	—	—	—	—	—	—	48	50		The Revival
1990	"It Never Rains (In Southern California)"	34	1	—	—	—	—	—	—	—	69		The Revival
1991	"Whatever You Want"	48	1	—	—	—	—	—	—	—	—		The Revival
1991	"House Party II (I Don't Know What You Come to Do)"	—	19	—	141	—	—	—	—	—	—		House Party 2 (soundtrack)
1991	"Me and You"	—	—	—	—	—	—	—	—	—	—		Boyz n the Hood (soundtrack)
1993	"If I Had No Loot"	7	8	45	12	17	47	51	19	8	44	RIAA: Gold; ARIA: Gold	Sons of Soul
1993	"Anniversary"	10	2	—	70	44	—	—	—	16	—	RIAA: Gold	Sons of Soul
1994	"(Lay Your Head on My) Pillow"	31	4	—	—	—	—	—	—	—	—		Sons of Soul
1994	"Leavin"	82	41	—	—	—	—	—	—	30	—		Sons of Soul
1994	"My Ex-Girlfriend"	—	—	—	—	—	—	—	—	—	76		Sons of Soul
1994	"Slow Wine"	— (Note: "Slow Wine" did not enter the Billboard Hot 100, but peaked at number seven on the Bubbling Under Hot 100 chart.)	21	—	—	—	—	—	—	—	—		Sons of Soul
1996	"Let's Get Down"	—	5	—	—	—	—	—	—	8	33		House of Music
1997	"Thinking of You"	22	5	—	—	—	—	—	—	36	—		House of Music
1997	"Boys and Girls"	—	— (Note: "Boys and Girls" did not enter the Hot R&B/Hip-Hop Songs chart, as Billboard chart rules at the time prevented album cuts from charting, but peaked at number 52 on the Hot R&B/Hip-Hop Airplay chart.)	—	—	—	—	—	—	—	—		Hits
"—" denotes a recording that did not chart or was not released in that territory.

=== As featured artist ===
Year	Single	Peak chart positions			Certifications	Album
Year	Single	US	US R&B	US Dan	Certifications	Album
1994	"Weather 42"					Mi Vida Loca (soundtrack)
2004	"Diary" (Alicia Keys featuring Tony! Toni! Toné!)	8	2	1	RIAA: Gold	The Diary of Alicia Keys
