= Leavin' (Tony! Toni! Toné! song) =

Single by Tony! Toni! Toné!

from the album Sons of Soul
- Released: April 12, 1994
- Recorded: 1993
- Genre: Soul; funk; pop
- Length: 3:57 (radio edit); 5:57 (album version)
- Label: Wing; Mercury; Polygram
- Songwriters: John Smith; Raphael Wiggins; Q-Tip (musician); Ali Shaheed Muhammad
- Producer: Tony! Toni! Toné!

Tony! Toni! Toné! singles chronology
"(Lay Your Head on My) Pillow" (1994)	"Leavin'" (1994)	"Slow Wine" (1994)

Music video
- "Leavin'" on YouTube

"Leavin'" is a song by American R&B group Tony! Toni! Toné!, released on April 12, 1994 by Wing, Mercury and Polygram as the fourth single from their third album, Sons of Soul (1993). The optimistic, upbeat song features turntable scratches and a sample of A Tribe Called Quest's 1990 song "If the Papes Come". Music critics found the song's style and group member Raphael Wiggins' singing reminiscent of Smokey Robinson.

"Leavin'" charted at number 82 on the US Billboard Hot 100 and at number 41 on the Hot R&B Singles. It attained its highest charting in New Zealand, where it peaked at number 30. The song also appeared on the soundtrack to the 1994 film Beverly Hills Cop III.

== Music and lyrics ==
"Leavin'"
A 30-second sample of the song

Tony! Toni! Toné! recorded the song for their third album Sons of Soul, which was recorded and released in 1993. The song was produced by the group and written by group member Raphael Wiggins and guitarist John "Jubu" Smith.

"Leavin'" has an upbeat mood, a light, affectionate tone, soulful vocals, and sweeping string arrangements. Musically, it exemplifies the group's incorporation of traditional soul styles on Sons of Soul. It also features snippets of turntable scratches. It contains a sample of "If the Papes Come" by A Tribe Called Quest.

== Critical reception ==
Larry Flick from Billboard magazine wrote, "Sweet guitar play, soulful top-shelf vocals, and an overall summery feel should boost this cut from the group's Sons of Soul album as 'Pillow' descends charts. Snippets of turntable scratches, undeniably sweet strings, and a couple of hand claps build this edit to a spirited finish. A smile-inducer for pop and urban outlets." Gil Griffin from The Washington Post noted that the "sensual" song "evokes Temptations-style optimism" and that its strings and blues guitar riffs recall Smokey Robinson's 1967 song "I Second That Emotion". Laura Zucker of The Sacramento Bee compared Saadiq's falsetto singing on "Leavin'" to that of Robinson.

== Music video ==
The accompanying music video for "Leavin'" was released in April 1994. It featured elaborate graphics and showed the group in alternating settings, including a lush country meadow, a hillside vista, and an urban hub at night, the latter of which featured lurid peep show marquees and pimps watching their prostitutes. Michael Saunders of The Boston Globe finds the video analogous to the group's musical fusion of classic and contemporary styles on Sons of Soul, writing that it "attempts to capture that merger visually with high-tech graphics, with a slinky soundtrack powering the mood."

== Track listings ==
Cassette single
No.	Title	Length
1.	"Leavin'" (edit)	3:57
2.	"Leavin'" (album version)	5:16

CD single
No.	Title	Length
1.	"Leavin'" (edit)	3:57
2.	"Leavin'" (album version)	5:16
3.	"(Lay Your Head on My) Pillow" (radio edit)	3:32
4.	"If I Had No Loot" (album version)	4:01

== Track listings ==
Promo CD
No.	Title	Length
1.	"Leavin'" (Remix)	4:01
2.	"Leavin'" (In The Groove Remix)	3:59
3.	"Leavin'" (Raphael's Edit)	4:04

== Personnel ==
Credits adapted from CD single (PolyGram #855763-2).

- The B Company – artwork
- Gerry Brown – mixing
- Ed Eckstine – executive producer
- Nicky Kalliongis – editing
- Tony! Toni! Toné! – producer

== Charts ==
Chart (1994)	Peak position
New Zealand (RIANZ)	30
US Billboard Hot 100	82
US Hot R&B Singles (Billboard)	41
