= (Lay Your Head on My) Pillow =

- Cassette single artwork

Single by Tony! Toni! Toné!

from the album Sons of Soul
- Released: January 11, 1994
- Recorded: 1993
- Studio: Paradise Recording Studio in Sacramento, California
- Genre: R&B; soul; funk
- Length: 3:32 (radio edit); 6:12 (album version)
- Label: Mercury; Polygram
- Songwriters: Timothy Christian Riley; D'wayne Wiggins; Raphael Wiggins
- Producer: Tony! Toni! Toné!

Tony! Toni! Toné! singles chronology
"Anniversary" (1993)	"(Lay Your Head on My) Pillow" (1994)	"Leavin'" (1994)

Music video
- "(Lay Your Head on My) Pillow" (audio) on YouTube

"(Lay Your Head on My) Pillow" is a song by American R&B group Tony! Toni! Toné!. It was released by Mercury and Polygram Records on January 11, 1994, as the third single from their 1993 album Sons of Soul. The midtempo love ballad was written and produced by the group and recorded at Paradise Recording Studio in Sacramento, California.

"(Lay Your Head on My) Pillow" charted at number 31 on the US Billboard Hot 100 and at number four on the Hot R&B Singles. It was promoted with a music video wherein the group appeared nude; they conceived it as their response to criticism of male artists for sexually objectifying women in music videos.

== Music and lyrics ==
"(Lay Your Head on My) Pillow"
A 30-second sample of the song

Tony! Toni! Toné! recorded the song for their third album Sons of Soul, which was recorded and released in 1993. The song was produced and written by the group—drummer Timothy Christian Riley, guitarist D'wayne Wiggins, and bassist Raphael Wiggins.

A midtempo love ballad, "(Lay Your Head on My) Pillow" features tender, seductive lyrics. The group incorporated country-influenced pedal steel guitar in the song after a country band had used it at Paradise Recording Studio, where they recorded the song. Gil Griffin of The Washington Post writes that the song is informed by "the sensual moods of Barry White and Isaac Hayes".

== Critical reception ==
Upon the release, Larry Flick from Billboard magazine complimented it as "a swaying pop/R&B love song that solidifies act's fine reputation for crafting deliciously retro material and bringing it home with engaging vocals that exhibit above-average range and style."

== Music video ==
A music video for the song was released in February 1994. It featured the group members, along with several supporting actors, appearing nude. Members of the video crew were reported to have "giggled a lot" during the 14-hour shoot. It was reshot after BET, MTV, and other cable outlets requested them to minimize the nudity for airplay. D'wayne Wiggins explained the concept as their response to criticism of male artists for sexually objectifying women in music videos, calling their video "sort of a role-reversal thing". He said in an interview for The Atlanta Journal-Constitution that he received the most "giggles ... because I went first, which I had to do because I was the one leading everybody on to do it nude. It's not like it's nudity just for nudity's sake, but we didn't want to do another la-de-da video. It's like 14 or 15 people are together in a room and different people are shown without clothes at different times."

== Personnel ==
Credits are adapted from the single's 7-inch pressing (Wing #858260-7).

- Gerry Brown – mixing
- Ed Eckstine – executive producer
- Timothy Christian Riley – composer, drummer
- Tony! Toni! Toné! – producer
- D'wayne Wiggins – composer, guitarist
- Raphael Wiggins – bassist, composer

== Charts ==
=== Weekly charts ===
Chart (1994)	Peak position
US Billboard Hot 100	31
US Hot R&B/Hip-Hop Songs (Billboard)	4
US Rhythmic Airplay (Billboard)	6
US Cash Box Top 100	29

=== Year-end charts ===
Chart (1994)	Position
US Hot R&B/Hip-Hop Songs (Billboard)	35
