= Hits (Tony! Toni! Toné! album) =

Greatest hits album by Tony! Toni! Toné!
- Released: October 28, 1997
- Genres: R&B, soul, funk
- Length: 72:48
- Label: Mercury
- Producers: Tony! Toni! Toné!, Foster & McElroy, Quik

Tony! Toni! Toné! chronology
House of Music (1996)	Hits (1997)	The Best of Tony! Toni! Toné! (2001)

Hits is a compilation album by Tony! Toni! Toné!. It was released on October 28, 1997, by Mercury Records and was produced by Tony! Toni! Toné!, Foster & McElroy and Quik. Hits peaked at No. 54 on the Top R&B Albums chart.

== Critical reception ==
Professional ratings
Review scores
Source	Rating
AllMusic	4.5/5 stars
Christgau's Consumer Guide	A−
Encyclopedia of Popular Music	4/5 stars
Entertainment Weekly	A−
The Rolling Stone Album Guide	4/5 stars
Uncut	4/5 stars

In his review for AllMusic, critic Stephen Thomas Erlewine said Hits serves as both a great overview of the group and "a convincing argument that they were one of the best contemporary R&B bands of the early '90s". Matt Diehl of Entertainment Weekly argued that the album showcases the band's visionary mix of modern and classic soul, which "paved the way" for singers such as Maxwell and D'Angelo: "You won't find a more ebullient collection of jams anywhere else".

In his book Consumer Guide: Albums of the '90s (2000), Robert Christgau wrote that Tony! Toni! Toné! peaked only with House of Music in 1996, and "this one merely creates the illusion that they always had it in them to match easy pop funk like 'Feels Good' and 'Little Walter' with come-ons like the opportunistic 'Thinking of You' and the steadfast—a whole year, gosh—'Anniversary.'" Fred Schruers wrote in The Rolling Stone Album Guide (2004) that Hits is the best of the band's compilations because of its length and tasteful packaging, although the lyrics are poorly transcribed in the booklet.

== Track listing ==
1. "If I Had No Loot" (1993) – 4:01
2. "Boys and Girls" (1997) – 4:37
3. "Annie May" (1996) – 5:44
4. "The Blues" (1990) – 4:13
5. "Don't Fall in Love" (1996) – 4:42
6. "Little Walter" (1988) – 4:49
7. "Thinking of You" (1996) – 3:55
8. "Anniversary" (1993) – 4:30
9. "Feels Good" (1990) – 4:57
10. "Let's Get Down" (1996) – 4:57
11. "(Lay Your Head on My) Pillow" (1993) – 6:06
12. "It Never Rains (in Southern California)" (1990) – 4:59
13. "Baby Doll" (1988) – 5:39
14. "Whatever You Want" (1990) – 4:50
15. "My Ex-Girlfriend" (1993) – 4:49
