= House of Music =

Studio album by Tony! Toni! Toné!
- Released: November 19, 1996
- Recorded: September 1995 – September 1996
- Studios: Brilliant; Hyde Street (San Francisco); Coda; Grass Roots (Oakland); Encore; Image Recording; Westlake Recording (Los Angeles); Pookie Labs; Woodshed (Sacramento)
- Genres: R&B; soul; funk
- Length: 69:08
- Label: Mercury
- Producers: DJ Quik; G-One; Tony! Toni! Toné!

Tony! Toni! Toné! chronology
Sons of Soul (1993)	House of Music (1996)	Hits (1997)

Singles from House of Music
- 1. "Let's Get Down" Released: October 28, 1996; 2. "Thinking of You" Released: March 11, 1997

House of Music is the fourth and final studio album by American R&B band Tony! Toni! Toné!, released on November 19, 1996, by Mercury Records. It follows the success of the band's 1993 album Sons of Soul and a hiatus during which each member pursued individual musical projects.

For House of Music, Tony! Toni! Toné! regrouped in 1995 and worked at studios in San Francisco, Los Angeles, Oakland, and Sacramento. Bassist-vocalist Raphael Saadiq, guitarist-vocalist D'wayne Wiggins, and percussionist-keyboardist Timothy Christian Riley worked on songs for the album independently before recording them together as a group. Most of the album was produced by the band; the only song to feature outside production was "Let's Get Down", produced by Saadiq with rapper-producer DJ Quik and G-One.

Tony! Toni! Toné! sought to emphasize musicianship rather than production technique during the sessions for House of Music. Expanding on their previous work's traditional R&B influences with live instrumentation and balladry, the album features both contemporary and older musical sensibilities alongside witty, sensitive lyrics informed by the spirit of romantic love and seduction. Tony! Toni! Toné! named the album after a small record store in the band's native city of Oakland, which Wiggins said they were reminded of after listening to the finished music.

House of Music charted for 31 weeks on the Billboard 200, peaking at number 32, and was certified Platinum by the Recording Industry Association of America (RIAA). Critics widely praised Tony! Toni! Toné!'s musicianship and songwriting, later deeming the album a masterpiece of 1990s R&B. An international tour promoting House of Music was planned but did not materialize amid growing tensions within the group stemming from creative differences and Mercury's management. They disbanded shortly after the album's release to pursue separate music careers.

== Background ==
Tony! Toni! Toné! took a hiatus as a group after the commercial and critical success of their third album Sons of Soul (1993). According to vocalist and bassist Raphael Wiggins, each member had pursued individual music projects, and "the group was trying to figure out where everybody's time, space and head was at." He, D'wayne Wiggins, and Timothy Christian Riley worked on songwriting and production for other recording artists during the band's hiatus, including D'Angelo, En Vogue, Karyn White, Tevin Campbell, and A Tribe Called Quest. Raphael Wiggins adopted the surname "Saadiq" for his professional name in 1994—meaning "man of his word" in Arabic—and released his solo single "Ask of You" in 1995. Their work outside the band led to rumors of a break-up during the time between albums, before regrouping to record House of Music.

== Recording and production ==
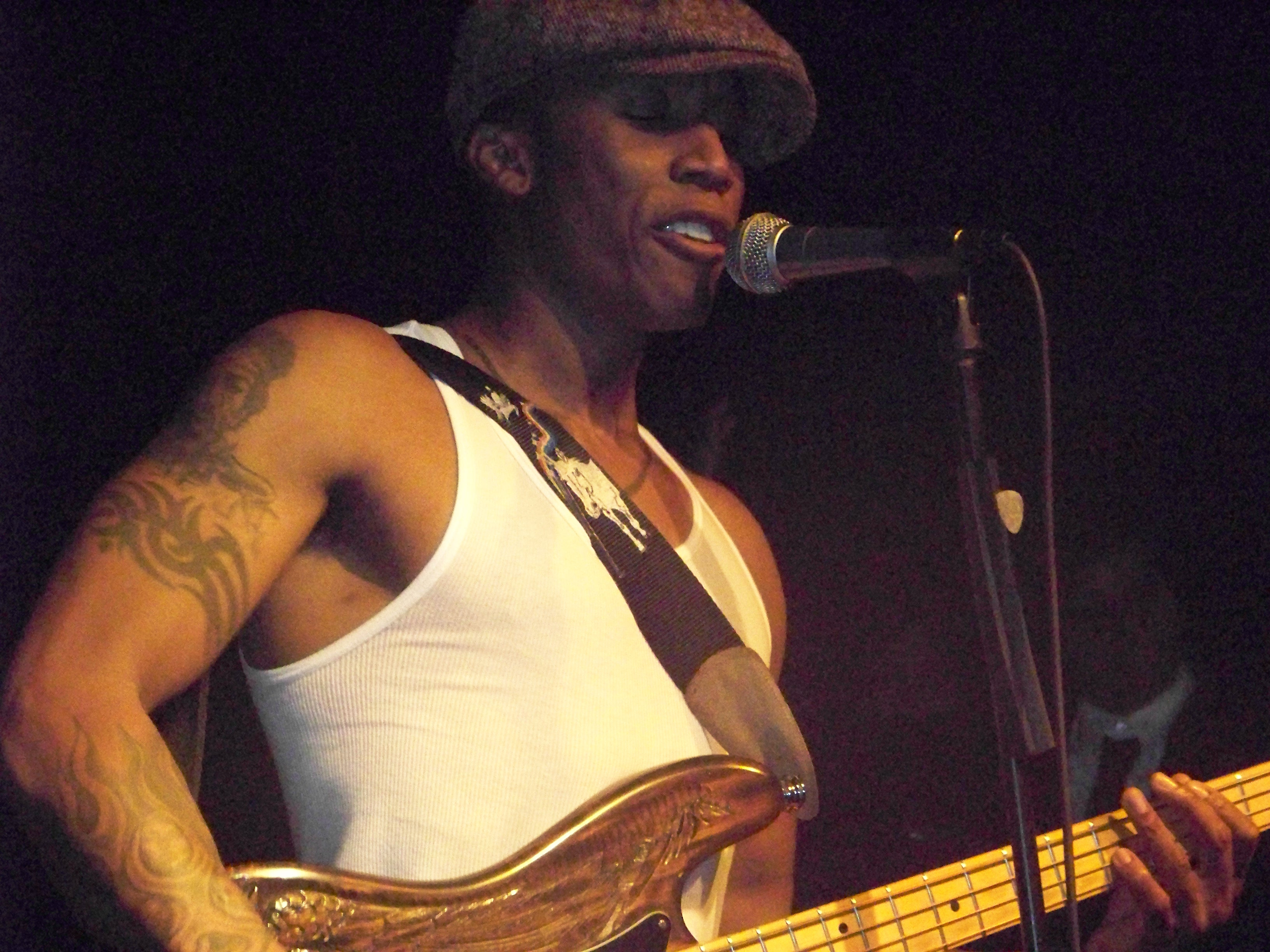
Raphael Saadiq in 2008

House of Music was recorded in sessions that began in September 1995 and took place at the following California-based studios: Brilliant Studios and Hyde Street Studios in San Francisco; Coda Studios and Grass Roots Studios in Oakland; Encore Studios, Image Recording, and Westlake Recording Studios in Los Angeles; and Pookie Labs and Woodshed Studios in Sacramento.

Tony! Toni! Toné! used vintage recording equipment and, for certain tracks, a 40-piece orchestra. Some songs also featured guest musicians, including rapper and producer DJ Quik, percussionist Sheila E., and the Tower of Power horn section. Saadiq worked with DJ Quik on the song "Let's Get Down" and said the collaboration proved very "natural" because of the producer's affinity for funk music. Tony! Toni! Toné! wanted to record the album with an emphasis on musicianship rather than production flair. Wiggins felt that the absence of their once prominent synthesizers made the resulting music sound more distinctive. "On a lot of the songs, you can just imagine a five-piece band performing", he later told USA Today.

Unlike the group's previous albums, each member arranged, composed, and produced songs on their own before putting the finished recordings together for House of Music. According to Saadiq, "what I did was write a lot of stuff and rehearse it for about a month, then recorded it live. Then [Wiggins and Riley] would add their parts separately." He worked with his own recording crew for House of Music, featuring guitarist Chalmers "Spanky" Alford, drummer Tommy Branford, and keyboardists Kelvin Wooten and Cedric Draper. Wiggins believed the band's hiatus benefited the recording of House of Music, making them less likely to produce an album derivative of Sons of Soul.

It's not just a bunch of grooves that we put together and made sure that the tempo fit. Lyrically and musically, it talks about something, and you're able to feel the emotional buildup that we felt when we were making the songs. It's funny though. Even though we did the music separately, when we got together, it all had the same kind of sound.

— D'wayne Wiggins (1996)

The album's opening track, the Al Green-styled "Thinking of You", was one the group conceived and recorded together at 3:00 a.m. in Saadiq's Pookie Labs studio. As he remembered it, "I was just playing around and started singing off the top of my head. I never wrote anything down, it was just what came out." "Annie May", one of Wiggins' songs for House of Music, had Saadiq's backing vocals pre-recorded and then overdubbed to the track's final mix. Tony! Toni! Toné! completed recording House of Music in September 1996. The album was then mastered by Brian Gardner at the Bernie Grundman Mastering studio in Hollywood.

One of Saadiq's songs for the album, "Me and the Blind Man", was excluded from the final mix because, as Saadiq told Yahoo! Music, "they didn't want anybody playing favorites, so one of my songs had to come off." The recording was a moody blues piece with surrealistic lyrics about lust, longing, and a fictitious blind man's secret powers. Saadiq wanted to show "a darker side ... some depth" to listeners with the song. "To me, songs like 'Blind Man' make the whole sound, the House of Music", he remarked. It was featured on an album sampler sent by the group's label to music journalists. Saadiq later recorded a version of "Blind Man" for his 2002 solo album Instant Vintage.

== Music and lyrics ==
House of Music expands on the traditional R&B influences of Tony! Toni! Toné!'s previous work, emphasizing live instrumentation and ballads. In the opinion of Daily Herald writer Dan Kening, the album is a continuation of the band's mix of contemporary R&B and old-fashioned soul, resulting in "half a tribute to their '60s and '70s soul music roots and half a masterful blend of modern smooth balladeering and danceable funk." Salon critic Jennie Yabroff believed House of Music mostly features ballads in the form of "slow, emotional numbers with muted beats" that accentuate the lyrics. According to Drum magazine, mid-tempo songs such as "Thinking of You" and "Still a Man" rely strongly on 1960s R&B/soul "given a contemporary face", while up-tempo songs such as "Lovin' You", "Don't Fall in Love", and "Let's Get Down" have elements of funk.

The lyrics on House of Music are described by several journalists as witty and sensitive. Michaelangelo Matos of the Chicago Reader characterizes Saadiq's songwriting as playful and quirky, while comparing his tenor singing voice to that of a young Michael Jackson. Of Wiggins, Matos says his melodies and rhythms are subtler than those of Saadiq and observes "burnished obbligatos, hushed burr, and starry-eyed falsetto" in his singing. Saadiq alternates with Wiggins as lead vocalist throughout the album. Richard Torres of Newsday attributes the group's lyrics on the album to their "[belief] in the power of love and the lure of romance".

"Lovin' You"
"Lovin' You" features electric piano, a slow groove, complex harmonies, and a saxophone solo.

According to Saadiq, the opening track "Thinking of You" is "a really soul, southern, funky song" inspired by Al Green. It has light guitar strokes and is sung in a Southern twang by Saadiq, while "Top Notch" features jazz elements and the vocalist's playful promise of a trip to Denny's for "the most expensive dinner we can find". On "Still a Man", he sings from the perspective of a man who was left by his wife to raise their children alone. The backing vocalists sing the meditative hook, "Have you ever loved somebody / Who loves you so much it hurts you to hurt them so bad?" On "Holy Smokes & Gee Whiz", Saadiq's older brother Randall Wiggins sings lead. It is described by Washington City Paper journalist Rickey Wright as a modernized version of the Stylistics' 1972 song "Betcha by Golly, Wow", featuring "a dead-on impression of Russell Thompkins' unmistakable falsetto and precise diction".

"Annie May", written by Wiggins, is a story about a "good girl next door" who becomes an exotic dancer, while "Let Me Know" is a love song with Wall of Sound elements. According to Nick Krewen of The Spectator, "Wild Child" is "a ballad in the grand sense" of the 1977 Earth, Wind & Fire song "Be Ever Wonderful". "Party Don't Cry", a meditation on mortality with jazzy, philosophical overtones, is said by Wright to convey "an overt spirituality unheard in the Tonyies' past songs". The album's closing track is a gospel-influenced instrumental and variation of "Lovin' You" composed by Saadiq. Its sole lyric, according to Wright, is a universalist platitude.

== Title and packaging ==
House of Music was named after a record store in the band's native Oakland, which had closed several years prior to the album's release. Wiggins explained in October 1996 to Billboard: "We title all our albums at the end of the project. We sat back and listened to everything, and it reminded us of this mom-and-pop store around our way in Oakland." "We grew up in a house of music", Wiggins continued, remarking how their father was a blues guitarist and music had a unifying effect on people. According to Billboard's Shawnee Smith, the album's title describes a varied, complete work distinct from a contemporary music market oversaturated by "retro-soul groups".

The album's cover and booklet photos were taken by photographer William Claxton, who captured Tony! Toni! Toné! dressed in casual and formal, retro clothing. This departure from the more outré wardrobe of the band's past was interpreted by journalist Brandon Ousley as an effort to promote "the elegance of 1960s-era Black America and legendary soul acts to a modern generation".

== Marketing and sales ==
House of Music was released on November 19, 1996, by Mercury Records. The label planned the release date to coincide with the peak holiday shopping period and ran ad campaigns scheduled for network cable, syndicated television shows, and radio stations. Tony! Toni! Toné! inaugurated its release with a satellite press conference and in-store performance at a small retail outlet in the San Francisco Bay Area. They also embarked on a tour of historically black colleges and Black Independent Coalition record shops after "Let's Get Down" had been sent to R&B and crossover radio on October 28 as the album's lead single; its music video was released to outlets such as BET, The Box, and MTV. Tony! Toni! Toné! performed the song on the sketch comedy show All That; on the music variety program Soul Train, they performed "Let's Get Down" and "Annie May".

In its first eight weeks, House of Music sold 318,502 copies in the US. It peaked at number 32 on the Billboard 200 and spent 31 weeks on the chart. "Thinking of You" was released as the second single on March 11, 1997, by which time House of Music had sold 514,000 copies, according to Nielsen SoundScan. On August 6, the album was certified Platinum by the Recording Industry Association of America (RIAA).

There should have been like four singles from that album. You'll have to call Mercury on that. It went platinum with no promotional tour. We did our job and they made their money. It's not like back in the day, when Jimi Hendrix would come out and people at the record label would say you got to meet this artist. It's almost like you're a computer chip. It's not like you're a person.

— Saadiq (1997)

During the album's marketing campaign, Tony! Toni! Toné! experienced growing tensions stemming from creative differences, business-related problems, and Saadiq's interest in a solo career. "There's a quiet stress between us that no one really talks about", Saadiq told Vibe in February 1997. "And what's sad about the whole thing is the fact that our friendship is disintegrating. Who knows, House of Music could be the last Tony Toni Toné album." According to Mercury vice president Marty Maidenberg, an international tour for the album had been planned by October 1996, with concert dates in Japan and the United Kingdom, but it never materialized.

The band remained committed to promoting the record into 1997, including a February 28 taped performance at VH1's Hard Rock Live special. Later that year, Mercury released the group's greatest hits album Hits (1997), prompting Saadiq to explain in a November interview for the Philadelphia Daily News that Tony! Toni! Toné! had experienced "a little turmoil" but are still together: "We're family. We all love each other and support each other. If we don't do any more records together, it doesn't matter." When asked about the status of House of Music's campaign, he suggested that it had ended and Mercury was at fault. The group disbanded shortly afterward, and each member went on to pursue an individual music career.

== Critical reception and legacy ==
Professional ratings
Review scores
Source	Rating
AllMusic	4/5 stars
Boston Herald	4/4 stars
Chicago Tribune	3.5/4 stars
Encyclopedia of Popular Music	4/5 stars
Entertainment Weekly	A–
Los Angeles Times	4/4 stars
The New Rolling Stone Album Guide	5/5 stars
Q	4/5 stars
USA Today	4/4 stars
The Village Voice	A

House of Music was met with positive reviews. Writing for Entertainment Weekly in November 1996, Ken Tucker found Tony! Toni! Toné!'s imitations of classic sounds "intelligent, sometimes brilliant", "witty", and "tremendously likable", with "a new recurring theme: what makes a man a man and a woman a woman, explored with both frankness and slyness". Sonia Murray of The Atlanta Journal-Constitution hailed it as the band's most effectual and multifaceted record yet, while Chicago Tribune critic Greg Kot said, "they find rapture that is steeped in reality rather than in the upwardly mobile fantasy concocted by many of today's less tradition-conscious R&B crooners." "The Tonies serve as a sort of stylistic missing link", J. D. Considine wrote in The Baltimore Sun, "suggesting what would have happened had the soul styles of the '70s continued to evolve, instead of being tossed aside by the synth-driven sound of the '80s". Michael A. Gonzales from Vibe said the album "glows a vision of blackness that is superbad, mad smooth, and crazy sexy". He described it as "a wonderland of harmonic delights, softcore jollies, and slow-jam fever floating on the tip of Cupid's arrow", showing the group "exploring the sensuality of black pop without sounding like boulevard bullies stalking their objects of desire".

At the end of 1996, House of Music was voted the 30th best album of the year in The Village Voice's annual Pazz & Jop poll, which polled 236 American critics nationwide. Robert Christgau, the poll's supervisor, ranked it 10th on his own year-end list. In his review for the newspaper, he deemed "Thinking of You" a "hilariously gutsy" and spot-on Al Green homage while writing of the album overall:

Raphael Saadiq and his henchmen give the r&b revival what for, constructing a generous original style from a varied history they know inside out—Tempts, Sly, Blue Magic, Kurtis Blow. And for almost every sound they provide a sharp song, which is more than Holland–Dozier–Holland and Gamble-Huff could manage when they were compelled to stick to one. Defeating second-half trail-off and a CD-age windiness the band isn't beatwise enough to beat, Saadiq's flexible, sensitive, slightly nasal tenor, spelled by the grain of D'wayne Wiggins's workaday baritone, recasts the tradition in its image.

In retrospect, Christgau attributed the album's success to Saadiq's lead role in Tony! Toni! Toné! He contended that "only with House of Music did they become true sons of the soul revival, the most accomplished r&b act of the '90s. That's still the album to remember them by." AllMusic editor Leo Stanley later remarked that the group "successfully accomplish their fusion of the traditional and contemporary ... within the framework of memorable, catchy songs" indebted to both old and modern R&B songwriting virtues. According to Stanley, the record had an influence on contemporary neo soul artists such as Tony Rich and Maxwell. In Matos' opinion, the album showcased the increasing artistic contrast between Saadiq and Wiggins, which "had grown so pronounced that the tension only enhanced what was already the group's best batch of songs". Rashod Ollison of The Virginian-Pilot regarded the record as "a flawless gem" on which the band's "amalgamation of traditional and contemporary styles coalesced beautifully". In The Rolling Stone Album Guide (2004), Fred Schruers said "House of Music consolidates the triumph of Sons of Soul for a masterpiece of 1990s R&B, an album that is as steeped in soul tradition as anything by Maxwell or D'Angelo, but that mixes the homage with humor and deft contemporary touches, thereby creating a new space all its own."

== Track listing ==
Information is taken from the album's liner notes.

No.	Title	Writer(s)	Producer(s)	Length
1.	"Thinking of You"	Timothy Christian Riley, Raphael Saadiq, D'wayne Wiggins	Tony! Toni! Toné!	3:56
2.	"Top Notch"	Elijah Baker, Saadiq, Kelvin Wooten	Raphael Saadiq	4:37
3.	"Let's Get Down"	George Archie, David Blake, Saadiq	Raphael Saadiq, DJ Quik, G-One	4:57
4.	"Til Last Summer"	Riley, John T. Smith, Wiggins	D'wayne Wiggins, Timothy Christian Riley	5:11
5.	"Lovin' You"	Saadiq	Raphael Saadiq	5:52
6.	"Still a Man"	Saadiq	Raphael Saadiq	7:17
7.	"Don't Fall in Love"	Saadiq	Raphael Saadiq	4:44
8.	"Holy Smokes & Gee Whiz"	Michelle Hailey, Carl Wheeler, Wiggins	D'wayne Wiggins	5:01
9.	"Annie May"	Riley, Wiggins	D'wayne Wiggins	5:55
10.	"Let Me Know"	Chalmers Alford, Saadiq	Raphael Saadiq	4:15
11.	"Tossin' & Turnin'"	Wiggins	D'wayne Wiggins	4:48
12.	"Wild Child"	Saadiq	Raphael Saadiq	5:36
13.	"Party Don't Cry"	Riley, Wiggins	D'wayne Wiggins, Timothy Christian Riley	5:06
14.	"Lovin' You (Interlude)"	Saadiq	Raphael Saadiq	1:53

== Personnel ==
Credits are adapted from the album's liner notes.

=== Tony! Toni! Toné! ===
- Timothy Christian Riley – acoustic piano, clavinet, drums, electric pianos, Hammond B-3 organ, percussion, production
- Raphael Saadiq – bass, guitar, keyboards, production, vocals
- D'wayne Wiggins – guitar, production, vocals

=== Additional musicians ===
- Greg Adams – trumpet
- Spanky Alford – guitar
- George Archie – musician
- Johnny Bamont – saxophone
- Sue Ann Carwell – background vocals
- Tommy Bradford – drums
- DJ Quik – production, triangle, vocals on "Let's Get Down"
- Pete Escovedo – percussion
- Clare Fischer – string arrangements
- Mic Gillette – trombone
- Elijah Baker Hassan – bass guitar
- Bobette Jamison-Harrison – background vocals
- Vince Lars – saxophone
- Marvin McFadden – trumpet
- Nick Moroch – guitar
- Bill Ortiz – trumpet
- Conesha Owens – background vocals
- Brenda Roy – background vocals
- Sheila E. – percussion
- Jackie Simley – background vocals
- Joel Smith – bass guitar, drums
- Charles Veal – orchestration
- Carl Wheeler – background vocals, engineering, keyboards
- Randall Wiggins – background vocals, vocals
- Kelvin Wooten – keyboards, string arrangements
- Benjamin Wright – string arrangements

=== Production ===
- Danny Alonso – engineering
- Mike Bogus – assistant engineering, engineering
- Gerry Brown – engineering, mixing
- Milton Chan – assistant engineering
- William Claxton – photography
- Jim Danis – assistant engineering
- Tim Donovan – mixing assistance
- Maureen Droney – production coordination
- Steve Durkey – mixing assistance
- Brian Gardner – mastering
- Danny Goldberg – executive production
- Margery Greenspan – art direction
- Darrin Harris – engineering
- Carter Humphrey – mixing assistance
- Richard Huredia – mixing assistance
- Wes Johnson – assistant engineering
- Booker T. Jones III – mixing
- Ken Kessie – engineering, mixing
- Brian Kinkel – engineering
- Marty Main – assistant engineer, engineering
- Bill Malina – editing, engineering, mixing
- Jason Mauza – mixing assistance
- Marty Ogden – engineering
- Chris Puram – mixing
- Tracy Riley – production coordination
- Skip Saylor – engineering
- Joey Swails – engineering, programming
- Raymond Taylor-Smith – mixing assistance
- Tulio Torrinello, Jr. – engineering
- Terri Wong – assistant engineer
- Brian Young – assistant engineer

== Charts ==
=== Weekly charts ===
Chart (1996–1997)	Peak position
US Billboard 200	32
US Top R&B/Hip-Hop Albums (Billboard)	10

=== Year-end charts ===
Chart (1997)	Position
US Billboard 200	100
US Top R&B/Hip-Hop Albums (Billboard)	28

=== Singles ===
Song	Chart (1997)	Peak position
"Let's Get Down"	New Zealand Singles Chart	8
"Let's Get Down"	UK Singles Chart	33
"Let's Get Down"	US Billboard Hot 100 Airplay	30
"Let's Get Down"	US Billboard Hot R&B Airplay	4
"Thinking of You"	New Zealand Singles Chart	36
"Thinking of You"	US Billboard Hot 100	22
"Thinking of You"	US Billboard Hot R&B Singles	5

== Bibliography ==
- Anon. [a] (November 21, 1996). "Tony Toni Toné Hits Comeback Trail". The Muncie Times.
- Anon. [b] (1996). House of Music (CD booklet). Tony! Toni! Toné!. United States: Mercury Records. P 2–34250.
- Anon. [c] (September 27, 1996). "The Spin – More Smooth Grooves from the Masters". Contra Costa Times. MediaNews Group.
- Anon. [d] (November 18, 1996). "Spicey New Release from Tony Toni Tone". Press-Telegram. MediaNews Group.
- Anon. [a] (January 19, 1997). "Seductive Sounds, Seductive Choices – Sacramento's Raphael Saadiq May Be Ready to Move Beyond Tony Toni Tone". The Sacramento Bee. The McClatchy Company.
- Anon. [b] (July 1997). "Review: 'House of Music'". Drum. African Drum Publications. OEknAQAAIAAJ – via Google Books.
- Anon. [c] (February 1997). "Tony! Toni! Toné! – House of Music (Mercury)". Q. No. 125. EMAP Metro Ltd.
- Anon. [d] (February 25, 1997). "The 1996 Pazz & Jop Critics Poll". The Village Voice. Village Voice Media.
- Anon. [e] (January 11, 1997). "Hot 100 Airplay". Billboard. Vol. 109, no. 2. Nielsen Business Media. ISSN 0006-2510. wQ4EAAAAMBAJ – via Google Books.
- Anon. [f] (January 11, 1997). "Hot R&B Airplay". Billboard. Vol. 109, no. 2. Nielsen Business Media. ISSN 0006-2510. wQ4EAAAAMBAJ – via Google Books.
- Anon. [a] (n.d.). "House of Music – Tony! Toni! Tone!". Billboard. Nielsen Business Media.
- Anon. [b] (n.d.). "Watch All That Season 3 Episode 8 Tony Toni Tone". OVGuide. Archived from the original on March 17, 2012.
- Anon. [c] (n.d.). "Watch Soul Train Season 26 Episode 22 Tony! Toni! Tone!/ Montell Jordan/ Ms. Soul Train & Mr. Soul Train Contest". OVGuide. Online Video Guide. Archived from the original on March 17, 2012.
- Anon. [d] (n.d.). "RIAA – Recording Industry Association of America". Recording Industry Association of America (RIAA).
- Anon. [e] (n.d.). "Tony! Toni! Toné! – Let's Get Down". charts.nz. Hung Medien.
- Anon. [f] (n.d.). "1997-05-03 Top 40 Official UK Singles Archive". Official Charts Company.
- Anon. [g] (n.d.). "Tony! Toni! Toné! – Thinking of You". charts.nz. Hung Medien.
- Anon. [h] (n.d.). "Thinking of You – Tony! Toni! Toné!". Billboard. Nielsen Business Media.
- Brown, David W. (December 6, 1996). "Tony Toni Tone Brings Back Unprocessed Spirit of Soul". The Harvard Crimson.
- Christgau, Robert (December 17, 1996). "Consumer Guide". The Village Voice. Village Voice Media.
- Christgau, Robert (February 25, 1997). "Pazz & Jop 1996: Dean's List". The Village Voice. Village Voice Media.
- Christgau, Robert (2000). Christgau's Consumer Guide: Albums of the '90s. Macmillan. ISBN 0-312-24560-2.
- Christgau, Robert (October 2008). "Inside Music: Consumer Guide". MSN Music. Microsoft. Archived from the original on December 9, 2011.
- Coker, Cheo Hodari (January 12, 1997). "Time to Jam – or Jam?". Los Angeles Times.
- Considine, J.D. (November 14, 1996). "CD Reviews". The Baltimore Sun. Tribune Company. Archived from the original on September 28, 2012.
- Green, Tony (May 2003). "Props – Tony Toni Toné". Vibe. Vol. 11, no. 5. Vibe Media Group. ISSN 1070-4701 – via Google Books.
- Goldberg, Danny (January 26, 1997). "'House' Afire". Los Angeles Times.
- Gonzales, Michael A. (December 1996). "Tony Toni Toné 'House of Music' (Mercury)". Vibe. Vol. 4, no. 10. Vibe Media Group. ISSN 1070-4701 – via Google Books.
- Gonzales, Michael A. (February 1997). "Family Ties". Vibe. Vol. 5, no. 1. Vibe Media Group. ISSN 1070-4701 – via Google Books.
- Hooper, Kim L. (November 24, 1996). "'Bow Down' disc fuels West-East rap feud". The Indianapolis Star. Gannett Company.
- Johnson, Connie (December 8, 1996). "Making a List? Checking It Twice? Here Are Some Guidelines to Keep Befuddled Spouses, Parents of Teenagers and Others On the Right Track". Los Angeles Times.
- Johnson, Kevin C. (February 20, 2020). "After an absence from St. Louis, Raphael Saadiq delivers career-spanning set at the Pageant". St. Louis Post-Dispatch.
- Jones, Steve [a] (November 19, 1996). "A Retro-Active Dwelling Tony Toni Tone Returns with 'House of Music'". USA Today. Gannett Company.
- Jones, Steve [b] (November 19, 1996). "R&B Album Review". USA Today. Gannett Company. Archived from the original on October 7, 2001.
- Kening, Dan (December 20, 1996). "Tony Toni Tone Finds Right Groove in 'House' Album Reviews". Daily Herald. Paddock Publications.
- Kot, Greg (November 29, 1996). "Tony Toni Tone House of Music (Mercury)". Chicago Tribune. Tribune Company.
- Krewen, Nick (January 9, 1997). "A Thoughtful Rap Messenger". The Spectator. Torstar Corporation.
- Larkin, Colin (2011). "Tony! Toni! Toné!". Encyclopedia of Popular Music (5th ed.). Omnibus Press. ISBN 978-0-85712-595-8.
- Linden, Amy (August 15, 1997). "Tony Toni Tone Are in the House: Of Music, That Is". Yahoo! Music. Yahoo!.
- Matos, Michaelangelo (May 25, 2000). "Separate Ways". Chicago Reader. Creative Loafing.
- Murray, Sonia (November 21, 1996). "Soul Men of Tony Toni Tone Build a Very, Very Fine House". The Atlanta Journal-Constitution. Cox Enterprises.
- Ollison, Rashod (January 21, 2011). "Crate-Dig Dusty: Tony! Toni! Tone!, House of Music". The Virginian-Pilot. Landmark Media Enterprises.
- Ousley, Brandon (November 19, 2016). "Tribute: Celebrating 20 Years of Tony! Toni! Toné!'s 'House of Music'". Albumism.
- Peitier, Sidney (1997). "Tony Toni Toné, House of Music". Upscale: The Successful Black Magazine. Vol. 10. Upscale Communications. VY8OAQAAMAAJ – via Google Books.
- Pendleton, Tonya (November 21, 1997). "Tight Family Ties Suit Tony, Toni, Tone to T". Philadelphia Daily News. Philadelphia Media Network. Archived from the original on June 9, 2012.
- Reynolds, J. R. (March 29, 1997). "Tony Toni Toné Still in the Groove; 'Love Jones' Contest Seeks Love Lyrics". Billboard. Vol. 109, no. 13. Nielsen Business Media. p. 21. ISSN 0006-2510. 1Q4EAAAAMBAJ – via Google Books.
- Rodman, Sarah (December 6, 1996). "DISCS Vital 'House' has a solid foundation". Boston Herald. Herald Media.
- Schruers, Fred (2004). "Tony! Toni! Toné!". In Brackett, Nathan; Hoard, Christian (eds.). The New Rolling Stone Album Guide (4th ed.). Simon & Schuster. p. 818. ISBN 0-7432-0169-8.
- Smith, Shawnee (October 5, 1996). "Tony Toni Toné Rebuild Their 'House' – Mercury Set Finds Trio in Cohesive Style". Billboard. Vol. 108, no. 40. Nielsen Business Media. ISSN 0006-2510. 0QkEAAAAMBAJ – via Google Books.
- Stanley, Leo (n.d.). "House of Music – Tony! Toni! Toné!". AllMusic. Rovi Corporation.
- Torres, Richard (January 26, 1997). "On the Record". Newsday. Times-Mirror Company.
- Tucker, Ken (November 15, 1996). "Music Review: 'House of Music' Review". Entertainment Weekly. Time Inc..
- Wilson-Combs, Lana K. (February 22, 2003). "Oakland's Saadiq says he's already a winner". Oakland Tribune. MediaNews Group.
- Wright, Rickey (January 17, 1997). "Rubber Soul". Washington City Paper. Creative Loafing.
- Yabroff, Jennie (1996). "Sharps and Flats". Salon. Salon Media Group. Archived from the original on July 2, 2008.
