= Sons of Soul =

Studio album by Tony! Toni! Toné!
- Released: June 22, 1993
- Recorded: 1993
- Studio: Air L.A.; Paramount Recording; Westlake Recording (Hollywood); Pajama (Oakland); J.Jam Recording (Oakland Hills); Paradise Recording (Sacramento); Caribbean Sound Basin (Maraval)
- Genre: R&B; soul; funk; hip hop
- Length: 68:54
- Label: Wing; Mercury
- Producer: Tony! Toni! Toné!

Tony! Toni! Toné! chronology
The Revival (1990)	Sons of Soul (1993)	House of Music (1996)

Singles from Sons of Soul
- 1. "If I Had No Loot" Released: June 1, 1993; 2. "Anniversary" Released: September 14, 1993; 3. "(Lay Your Head on My) Pillow" Released: January 11, 1994; 4. "Leavin'" Released: April 12, 1994; 5. "Slow Wine" Released: July 19, 1994

Sons of Soul is the third album by American R&B band Tony! Toni! Toné!, released on June 22, 1993, by Wing Records and Mercury Records. It follows the success of their 1990 album The Revival, which had extended their popularity beyond R&B audiences and into the mainstream.

The band originally held recording sessions for Sons of Soul at several studios in California, including Westlake Recording Studios in Hollywood and Paradise Recording Studio in Sacramento. When they became jaded with the various people frequenting those studios, Tony! Toni! Toné! moved their sessions to Caribbean Sound Basin in Trinidad, where they ultimately wrote and recorded most of the album. It was produced entirely by the group, who worked with various session musicians and utilized both vintage and contemporary recording equipment.

Sons of Soul was recorded as an homage to Tony! Toni! Toné!'s musical influences—classic soul artists of the 1960s and 1970s. Its music incorporated live instrumentation, funk, and hip hop elements such as samples and scratches. Lead singer and bassist Raphael Wiggins handled most of the songwriting, which was characterized by quirky, flirtatious lyrics and reverent ballads.

A commercial success, Sons of Soul charted for 43 weeks on the Billboard 200 and earned a double platinum certification from the Recording Industry Association of America (RIAA). With the album, Tony! Toni! Toné! became one of the most popular R&B acts during the genre's commercial resurgence in the early 1990s. It was also a widespread critical success, ranking as one of 1993's best records in many critics' year-end lists.

== Background ==
Inspired by live instrumentation, turntablism, and classic soul music, Tony! Toni! Toné! recorded and produced their second album, The Revival, mostly themselves and released it in 1990 to commercial success. The record broadened the group's exposure to fans beyond their initial R&B audience. However, they became ambivalent about their newfound mainstream success and their music being labeled "retro" by critics. In an interview for People magazine, lead singer and bassist Raphael Wiggins expressed his dissatisfaction with the music industry, saying that "every record company wants to get a group and put 'em in a Benz with a car phone and a beeper, show them dressing in three different outfits, put them in a video shot on a beach with lots of swinging bikinis. You won't ever see us on a beach. We're just down-to-earth, funky, like-to-play guys." Before considering a follow-up album, the band recorded several songs for film soundtracks, including "Me and You" for Boyz n the Hood (1991), "House Party (I Don't Know What You Come to Do)" for House Party 2 (1991), and "Waiting on You" for Poetic Justice (1993).

Having fulfilled their creative intentions with The Revival, Tony! Toni! Toné! wanted to pay homage to their musical influences with Sons of Soul. In a 1993 interview for The New York Times, Wiggins elaborated on their direction for the album, stating "We're paying homage to a lot of older artists who paved the way for us artists like the Temptations, Sly and the Family Stone, Earth, Wind and Fire. They're the people who inspired us when we were growing up, people like Aretha Franklin, James Brown. We feel we're the sons of everything and all those people who came before us." He also explained the album's title as a declaration of them being descendants of those artists, "not in a grandiose sense, but from the standpoint that we really are the musical offspring of all that's come before us ... paying homage to our past, but creating in a contemporary environment."

== Recording ==
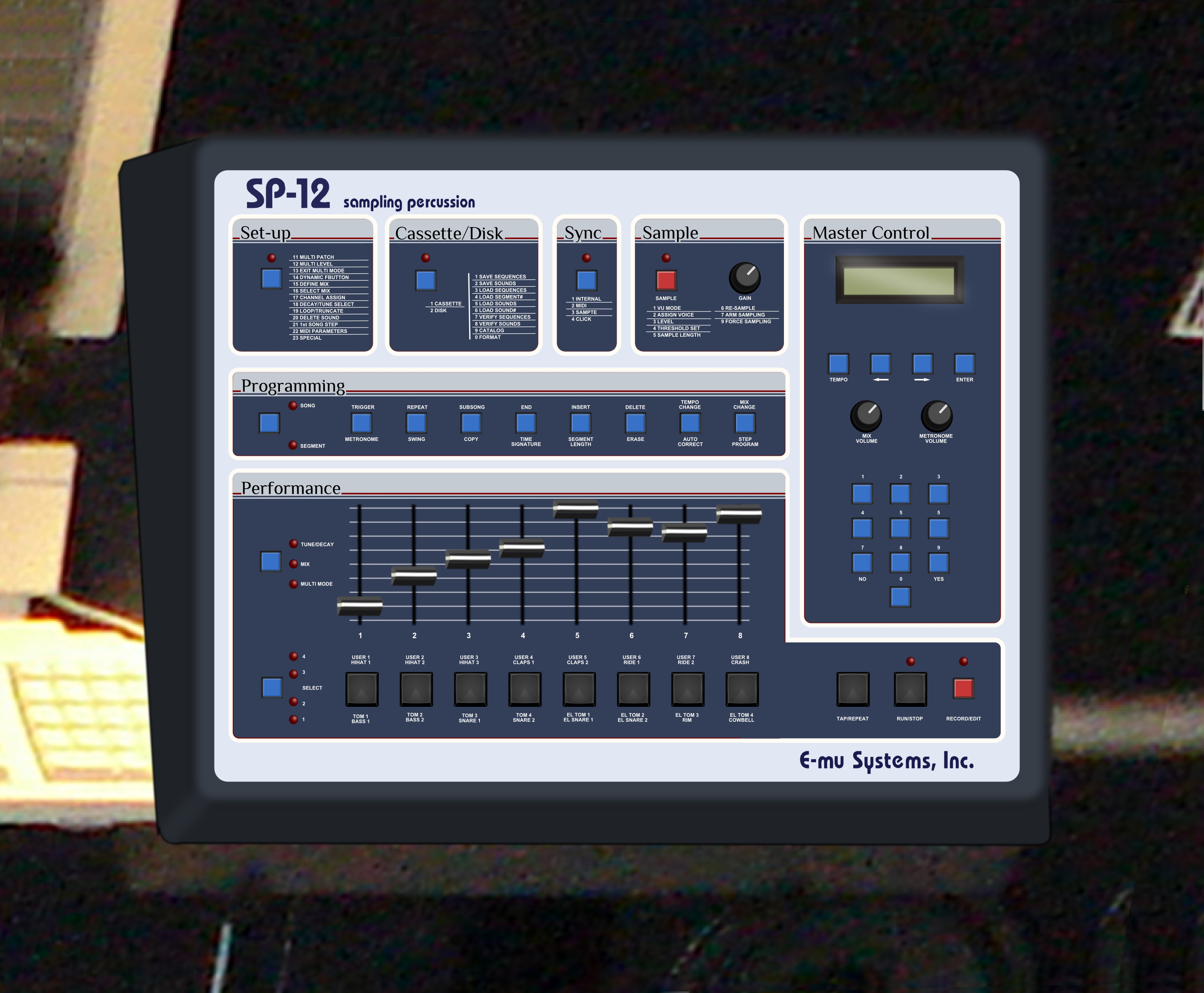
An E-mu SP-12, used by D'wayne Wiggins to create drum loops for tracks

The group began recording Sons of Soul in 1993. They initially held sessions at several recording studios in California, including Air L.A. Studios, Paramount Recording Studios, and Westlake Recording Studios in Hollywood, Pajama Studios in Oakland, J.Jam Recording in Oakland Hills, and Paradise Recording Studio in Sacramento, where Raphael Wiggins resided at the time. Wiggins, his brother guitarist D'wayne Wiggins, and drummer Timothy Christian Riley each played several instruments for the album. Raphael and D'wayne came up with ideas for songs by playing guitar and a drum machine, and working them into compositions with Riley and Carl Wheeler, an unofficial member and in-studio keyboardist for the group. They also created drum loops at their homes, with Raphael using an Akai MPC60 and D'wayne using an E-mu SP-12, and the group improvised their respective instrumental parts for songs at the studio to a certain loop.

They also worked with various session musicians, including string arranger Benjamin Wright, saxophonists Gerald Albright and Lenny Pickett, trumpeter Ray Brown, arranger Clare Fischer, and audio engineer Gerry Brown. Brown engineered the group's previous albums, and later their subsequent output, including Raphael Wiggins' solo albums after Tony! Toni! Toné! Brown recommended for him to use a dynamic microphone when recording his vocals to thicken them with more bass, a practice Wiggins continued throughout his career. Wiggins sought after former Temptations vocalist Eddie Kendricks to sing on "Leavin'", but Kendricks died prior to the sessions. They also worked with two horn sections, The Fat Lip Horns and The SNL Horns, the horn section of the Saturday Night Live Band. Raphael and D'wayne Wiggins sang impromptu musical ideas to the SNL players, who in turn modelled their horn parts after their singing.

=== Trinidad sessions ===
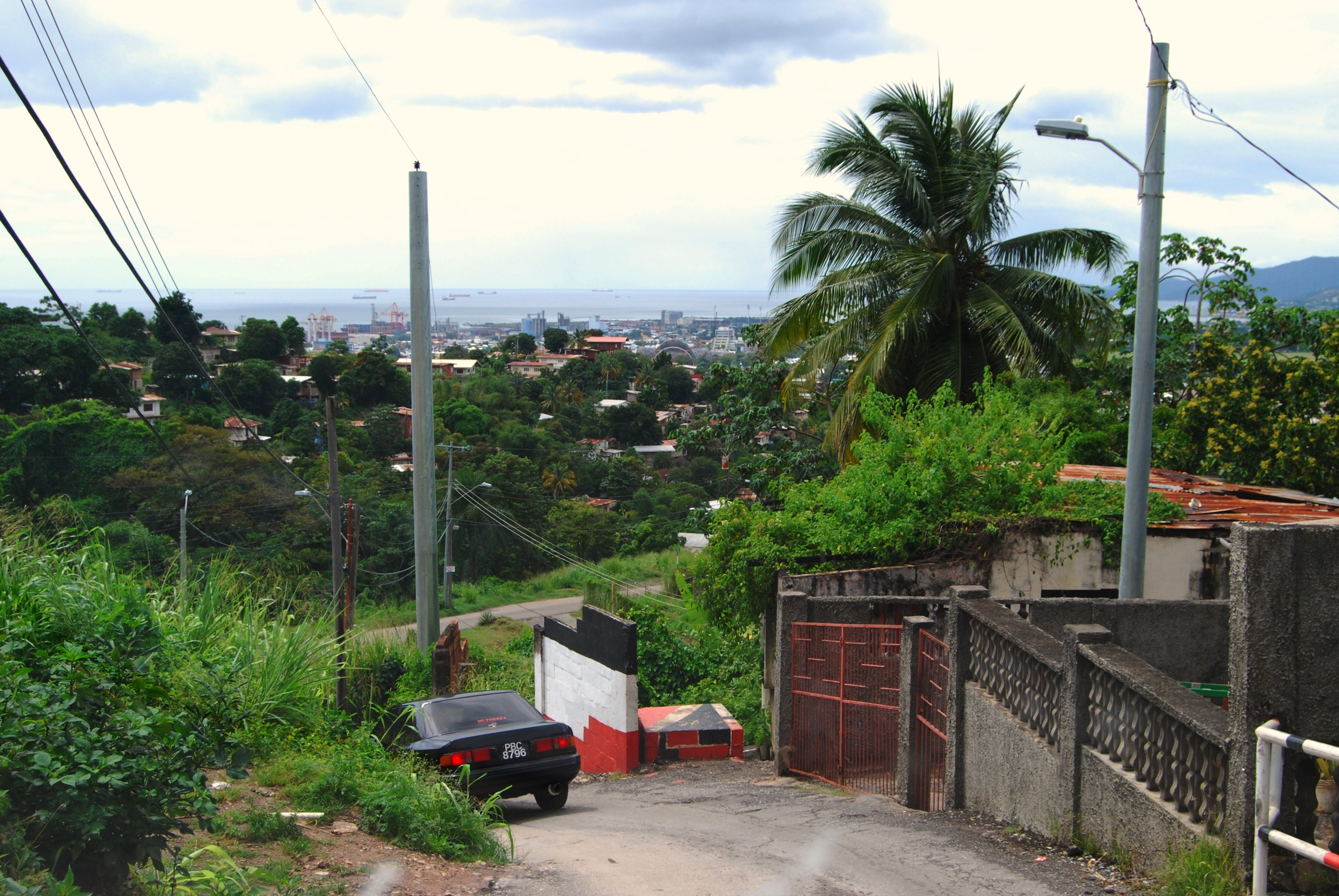
The Trinidadian suburb of Maraval, home to Caribbean Sound Basin

Jaded with their lifestyles in California and the various people frequenting the studios, the group moved the sessions to Caribbean Sound Basin in Maraval, a suburb of Port of Spain, Trinidad. The studio complex was one of Trinidad's few high-end recording locations and was founded in 1990 by Trinidadian businessman Robert Amar, who wanted to attract both local and international recording artists with a state-of-the-art facility and the area's culture. The group intended to use to the studio only to polish their previous sessions' output, but ended up writing and recording what became most of the album for two months. D'wayne Wiggins said of the move in an interview for Musician, "the record company really wanted to put what we had out, but we ourselves didn't feel like the album was done."

Caribbean Sound Basin housed three separate studios and several amenities, including a swimming pool, gym, sauna, photographic studio, and bedroom suites. In contrast to most recording studios, its interior was spacious and exposed to natural light. At the studio complex, Raphael, D'wayne, and Riley recorded extensively into the night and went out to enjoy the nightlife, before returning to the studio. They often dimmed the lights, burned incense, and drank wine to set the mood when recording, which D'wayne explained in Musician, "We try to make it real calm and mellow. 'Cause you want to be able to get into what you're singing." They also immersed themselves in the local dancehall scene and attended late-night block parties that lasted until dawn. D'wayne later recalled his nightlife experiences with the group in Maravel:

We'd heard dancehall, but we didn't really know anything about it before going there. We would go to these block parties and you could hear them from almost a mile away. You'd just park on the street and walk to the party along with four or five thousand other people, all partying with these giant speakers all over the place. And this happened just about every weekend.

Their subsequent recording for the album was influenced by their experiences in Trinidad and Caribbean musical styles, including the rhythms and festive atmosphere of the local music scene. They enlisted Trinidadian dancehall artist General Grant, a regular at Caribbean Sound Basin, to perform a ragga rap on "What Goes Around Comes Around" and "Dance Hall", songs they developed in Trinidad. Raphael Wiggins recalled this in an interview for the Toronto Star: "[Grant] was just hanging around the studio. We asked him to come freestyle on ['What Goes Around Comes Around']. After that, he just kept hanging around. Then we had the song 'Dance Hall' playing one night and he started again, so we just turned on the mic." "My Ex-Girlfriend" was also recorded there. According to D'wayne, they recorded "Tonyies! In the Wrong Key" in the studio at 3 a.m., and Raphael was "quite snookered" on an alcoholic beverage when delivering his vocals. Collectively, the group had written and recorded approximately 40 songs at the end of the sessions. In an interview for Billboard, D'wayne Wiggins said that they focused on the love songs when having to decide what songs would make the album.

=== Production ===
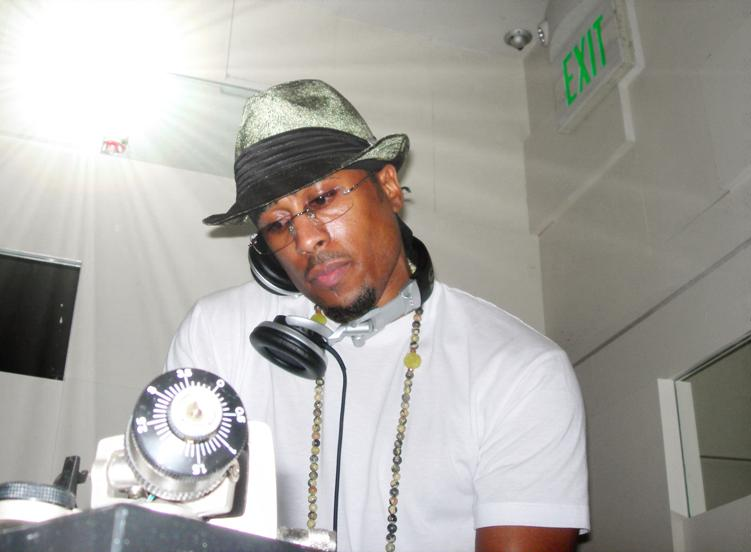
DJ Ali Shaheed Muhammad (shown in 2008) assisted the production.

Unlike with their previous albums, the group produced Sons of Soul entirely themselves. They utilized both vintage and contemporary recording gear in the album's production, including a Hammond B-3, Clavinet, ARP String Ensemble, and Korg and Roland synthesizers. Riley viewed that hearing music played from the older instruments affected their songwriting. For his vocals, Raphael recorded with Neumann U 87 and AKG C12A condenser mics, as well as a vintage RCA Type 77-DX microphone. He used a custom five-string bass from a guitar and bass repair shop in San Francisco, as well as a Minimoog analog synthesizer for other bass lines on the album. D'wayne used a Microtech Gefell UM70 for his lead vocals and an AKG 414 for his background vocals. He played a vintage Gibson L6-S and a Fender Coronado guitar, modified with Gibson burst bucker pickups. Aside from his drumming, Riley played both Wurlitzer and Fender Rhodes electric pianos.

Caribbean Sound Basin's main studio had both analog and digital equipment, a 60 ft x 70 ft x 18 ft live room, and three isolation booths, for vocals, piano, and drums. The group recorded original tracks using Studer 24- and 48-track recorders and transferred them to a Sony digital recorder. For most songs, MIDI keyboards were played live into a sequencer and left unquantized, while vintage keyboards were recorded to analog tape. Riley said of the process in an interview for Keyboard magazine, "even though we used a sequencer for some stuff, we'd still cut the song live from start to finish. See, the last record was all done with a Synclavier. But this time, we tried to keep it all live and raw."

Record producer and DJ Ali Shaheed Muhammad, credited for programming on the album, assisted in its production. He cited the group's fusion of hip hop production and live instrumentation for Sons of Soul as the inspiration for his subsequent work as a member of A Tribe Called Quest and The Ummah. Muhammad discussed his experience recording Sons of Soul in a 1998 interview, saying that "I'd just hooked this beat up, and [the group] picked up their instruments and started playing. Raphael was singing, and as soon as he touched the bass, it just blew me away." Raphael Wiggins explained how they valued instrumentation when recording the album, saying that "We want everyone to have something to relate to; a drummer will get into the live drums and so on."

Tony! Toni! Toné! tracked the final mixes of the songs at Caribbean Sound Basin. Its main studio used a 64-channel SSL 4064 G mixing console, the secondary studio used a 48-track Neve console with flying faders, and its third studio used an Amek BC2 console. The group mostly used the older Neve console. In tracking the songs, they started with a drum machine groove as a basic track and recorded it. The parts recorded with live instrumentation were then added to the mix. Live drums and horn sections were included to attain the sound of performing live. Sons of Soul was subsequently mastered by engineer Herb Powers at his New York City studio P.M. Entertainment.

== Music and lyrics ==
Sons of Soul expanded on the traditional R&B influences of The Revival, with upbeat funk and classic Motown styles. Songs such as "If I Had No Loot", "My Ex-Girlfriend", and "Tell Me Mama" incorporated lively tempos, strident harmonies, melodic hooks and lead vocalist Raphael Wiggins' high tenor singing. Other songs were performed with funk grooves, including "I Couldn't Keep It to Myself", "Gangsta Groove", "Fun", and "Tonyies! In the Wrong Key". Rick Mitchell of the Houston Chronicle wrote that the songs' arrangements "cleverly ... integrate classic influences into contemporary grooves." Carl Allen of The Buffalo News claimed that the album "reconnected" black popular music "to its gospel/blues roots with hip-hop flair."

Along with older R&B, the album's music appropriated contemporary urban styles such as dancehall and hip hop, incorporating hip hop beats, turntable scratches, and samples, which were taken from both contemporary rap and older soul. Tony Green of the St. Petersburg Times viewed that Tony! Toni! Toné! incorporated musical aspects from their R&B and hip hop contemporaries, thereby "representing black pop's Generation X. Mid- to late-twentysomethings caught [at] the tail end of the heyday of acts like Earth, Wind & Fire and Stevie Wonder [and] found themselves getting smacked in the face by the rap revolution." The group reproduced what they sampled with live instrumentation, which Keyboard magazine interpreted as an analog approach to the principally digital hip hop genre.

"What Goes Around Comes Around"
The uptempo song incorporates older soul and New jack swing styles, with a chanted chorus of "that's the name of the game / show no shame".

The lyrics on Sons of Soul were described by Los Angeles Times critic Connie Johnson as often quirky, while Elysa Gardner from Vibe said they were flirtatious and tender, particularly on ballads such as "Slow Wine" and "(Lay Your Head on My) Pillow"; she felt the group's songwriting throughout the album possessed a "reverent" ethos. Raphael Wiggins was credited with the majority of the songwriting. Laura Zucker of The Sacramento Bee said most of the album was written "solidly in the R&B tradition of sweet talking and romancing." Unlike most contemporary R&B and hip hop music at the time, the album's lyrics lacked profane language, with the exception of "My Ex-Girlfriend", which featured the chorus "I couldn't believe it / They tried to tell me my ex-girlfriend is a ho!"

=== Songs ===
The album opens with "If I Had No Loot", which features a New jack swing beat, pronounced guitar licks, vocal samples from hip hop songs, and lyrics about fair-weather friends. The third track, "My Ex-Girlfriend", is a commentary on unfaithful partners, with lowbrow-humor lyrics scolding an ex-girlfriend for her promiscuity. It evolved from a concept D'wayne Wiggins came up with after driving past an Oakland hangout for prostitutes and recognized that one of them was an old friend. The upbeat ballad "Tell Me Mama" has surging dynamics, a horn-filled bridge, and lyrics about responsibility and regret. Phil Gallo of the Los Angeles Times writes that the song utilizes "Jackson 5 and Temptations vocal stylings, Earth, Wind & Fire horn charts and riffs from Sly & the Family Stone hits". According to Rolling Stone journalist Franklin Soults, the album's first five songs comprise a "tour de force that bounces from Motown to New Jack Swing and back before breaking for a series of ballads as sexy as they are sweet".

The first ballad, "Slow Wine", describes a Trinidadian slow grind dance, and the next, "(Lay Your Head on My) Pillow", features tender, seductive lyrics, with subtle come-ons, which according to Gil Griffin of The Washington Post "replace hip-hop braggadocio with soul music's promise." "I Couldn't Keep It to Myself" features lush strings and electric piano, which "create a jaunty atmosphere that harkens back to early Kool and the Gang and the Blackbyrds." Its narrator wants to brag to his friends about his new girlfriend's sexual abilities. "Gangsta Groove" adapts hip hop's "gangsta" trope in a humane story, in the vein of blaxploitation. It draws on the funk music of Parliament-Funkadelic, Cameo, and the Ohio Players. "Tonyies! In the Wrong Key" features a dreamy, dissonant soundscape, slurred vocals, swirling horns, and a James Brown sample. At its end, Raphael Wiggins sings the line "last night a DJ saved my life", a reference to the 1982 song of the same name. Wiggins found his impassive vocal style similar to Sly Stone's on "Family Affair" (1971).

"Dance Hall" is styled in the genre of the same name, and also incorporates funk. The segue track "Times Squares 2:30 A.M." was recorded by the group on the street with a tape recorder. "Fun" has a hip hop groove, jazz fusion tone, and irreverent, party theme similar to "Dance Hall". "Anniversary" is about mature, lasting love. Elysa Gardner of Vibe calls it "a grandly romantic, nine-minute bolero that lavishes its female subject with such warmth and respect that the cheeky misogyny of ['My Ex-Girlfriend'] seems instantly forgiveable." "Castleers" is a short vocal track and tribute to Raphael and D'wayne's Castlemont High School chorus group, Castleers Choir, in which they sang as students. Raphael said of its inspiration, "The high school choir was all about that classic R & B harmony, so I named the song after the choir. One of the great things about that experience at school was that it got us ready to go out in the professional world with our music."

== Marketing and sales ==
Sons of Soul was released on June 22, 1993, by Wing Records and Mercury Records, who created a heavy promotional campaign seeking to capitalize on the success of The Revival. Sons of Soul opened to strong sales and became Tony! Toni! Toné!'s highest-charting album. It debuted at number 38 on the Billboard 200 chart in the week of July 10. On July 24, it peaked at number three on the Billboard Top R&B Albums, on which it charted for 56 weeks. In its first eight weeks of release, Sons of Soul sold 281,961 copies in the US. It charted for 43 weeks on the Billboard 200, and on September 18, it reached its peak position at number 24. By November, the album had sold almost one million copies in the US. Five singles were released in its promotion, including the Hot 100 chart hits "If I Had No Loot" and "Anniversary". On November 14, 1995, the album was certified double platinum by the RIAA, for shipments of two million copies in the US. By 1997, it had sold 1.2 million copies, according to Nielsen SoundScan.

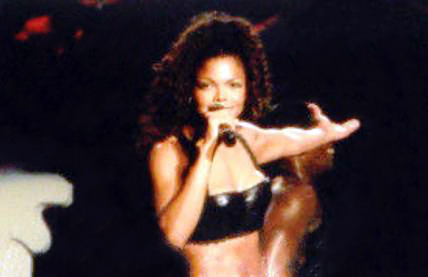
Tony! Toni! Toné! briefly performed on the Janet World Tour. (Janet Jackson shown on the tour in 1993)

To promote Sons of Soul, Tony! Toni! Toné! embarked on a supporting tour that broadened their audience and concert repertoire. Aside from national venues, they promoted the album with concerts in Europe, Australia, and Japan. They also performed on television shows such as Saturday Night Live, Late Show with David Letterman, and The Apollo Theatre Hall of Fame ceremony. In November 1993, the group joined singer Janet Jackson's high-profile Janet. World Tour as a supporting act. However, after a few performances, the band left in January 1994, expressing frustration over their limited time onstage and Jackson's frequent show cancellations. Riley said they were also forced to alter their set list for Jackson's more mainstream, pop audience, while a tour staffer recalled the group "left the tour with no advance notice" and "were extremely unprofessional." They were replaced by Mint Condition as Jackson's opening act. Tony! Toni! Toné! subsequently went on hiatus, as each member pursued his own musical projects, producing and writing for other recording artists, before reuniting to record their 1996 album House of Music.

== Critical reception and legacy ==
Contemporary reviews
Review scores
Source	Rating
Chicago Tribune	3.5/4 stars
Entertainment Weekly	A−
Los Angeles Times	3.5/4 stars
Music Week	3/5 stars
The Philadelphia Inquirer	3.5/4 stars
Q	4/5 stars
Spin	(Note: According to Spin magazine's rating key at the time, a yellow circle was the second on a scale of three colored circles and indicated an album that is "pretty good" but relatively inessential.)
USA Today	3.5/4 stars

Sons of Soul was met with widespread critical acclaim. Billboard praised the record's traditional influences and contemporary sensibilities, calling it "a prismatic record from a maturing group", and The New Yorker said Tony! Toni! Toné! easily transitioned from "irresistible dance tracks ... to lovely, sensuous ballads" on the album. In the Chicago Tribune, Greg Kot hailed Sons of Soul as "the most accomplished merger of hip-hop attitude with a '70s R&B aesthetic", deeming the group's funk and soul music savvy, particularly because of their incorporation of Memphis soul guitars and fashionable rhythms and turntable scratches. Kot compared Raphael Wiggins to Stevie Wonder as a singer, while USA Today's James T. Jones IV believed the record's groovy, catchy songs were comparable to Sly Stone. Reviewing the album in Time, Christopher John Farley found the music elegant and more innovative than the band's previous records. Michael Saunders from The Boston Globe believed even without a song as great as their 1990 hit "Feels Good", the record was "unquestionably better than nearly all of the formulaic soul/pop albums littering the charts", featuring ballads that sounded intimate without being overly sentimental.

Robert Christgau was less enthusiastic in his "Consumer Guide" column for The Village Voice, citing "If I Had No Loot" and "Anniversary" as highlights while jokingly calling the group "sexy liars of the year". (Note: Christgau later assigned the album a one-star honorable mention in his column-anthologizing book Christgau's Consumer Guide: Albums of the '90s (2000).) In a more critical review, Spin's Jonathan Bernstein felt that songs such as "If I Had No Loot" and "What Goes Around Comes Around" were derivative of Tony! Toni! Toné!'s past hits from The Revival, in an attempt to compete with contemporary R&B acts such as Silk, H-Town, and Intro. While Andy Gill of The Independent remarked, "This young soul trio's third album is the R&B equivalent of retro-rock, with a wide variety of old soul influences rendered up with loving care and attention to detail...But the Tonyies also put together measured, slick backing tracks which anchor old-style soul references within new-style technology."

At the end of 1993, Sons of Soul was voted the number 19th best album of the year in The Village Voice's annual Pazz & Jop critics' poll. Q magazine included it on its list of the 50 Best Albums of 1993, while Time ranked the album number one on its year-end list; an accompanying blurb in the list stated: "The Tonyies are a real band, with real instruments, who have succeeded in bringing the art of R.-and-B. songwriting back to the future." It was also named the best album of the year by James T. Jones IV of USA Today, and The New York Times, while Newsday named it one of the year's best albums. In 1994, "Anniversary" was nominated for Grammy Awards for Best R&B Song and Best R&B Performance by a Duo or Group with Vocals. The album also earned Tony! Toni! Toné! a 1994 critics' award for Best R&B Group from Rolling Stone. In 1995, Q included Sons of Soul in its publication "In Our Lifetime: Q's 100 Best Albums 1986–94", a list compiled to celebrate its 100th issue. In 2007, Vibe included the record in its list of the 150 Essential Albums of the Vibe Era (1992–2007).

=== Impact and reappraisal ===
Black music is stronger than it's ever been ... Tony! Toni! Toné! don't just sample their music, they actually play it. There's a return to musicianship.

— Jimmy Jam (1994)

Sons of Soul bridged the gap between commercial and critical success for Tony! Toni! Toné!, helping them become one of the most popular acts in R&B at the time. Its success exemplified the genre's commercial resurgence during the early 1990s, when hip hop became the predominant African-American music genre in the mainstream. In 1994, Greg Kot of the Chicago Tribune attributed its resurgence to younger artists' blend of live instrumentation and hip hop production values, and cited Sons of Soul as "the most accomplished merger of hip-hop attitude with a '70s R&B aesthetic." The Atlanta Journal-Constitution hailed it as "a gentle reminder of those glory days" and felt that the group having both vocal and musical talents is most indicative of a return to early R&B's aesthetics. Furthermore, they garnered mainstream attention in a year of several high-profile controversies with R&B and hip hop artists such as Michael Jackson and Snoop Dogg. David W. Brown of The Harvard Crimson wrote that Tony! Toni! Toné! is "known primarily for the quality of its music, not its extracurricular reputation, unlike other groups such as Jodeci who rely on a playa-gangsta-mack image to sell-records."

Along with acts such as Mint Condition and R. Kelly, Tony! Toni! Toné! played live instruments that complemented their hip hop sensibilities. Their concerts featured visual elements such as incense smoke and kaleidoscopic stage lighting, the group's eccentric wardrobe, and additional instrumentalists, including another guitarist, two drummers, two keyboardists, a violinist, a trumpeter, and a saxophonist. The Charlotte Observer remarked on the group in 1994: "[T]heir use of live instruments on record and onstage makes them an anomaly in the synthesized and sampled world of modern R&B." With the group's reliance on traditional soul and R&B values of songwriting and instrumentation, Sons of Soul was a precursor to the neo soul movement of the 1990s. Matt Weitz of The Dallas Morning News wrote in 1993 that the group had distinguished themselves from their New jack swing contemporaries with Sons of Soul and found them aesthetically akin to acts such as Prince and P.M. Dawn. Raphael Wiggins said of their success with the album:

We've been very blessed to be able to be a group that writes our own songs and people have accepted us from both sides, hip hop and the R&B crowd or whatever you might want to say. I feel very fortunate to be able to do that here in 1993–94, because like you know, it was starting to be a dying thing that was happening. But I guess we were like the bridge between hip hop and soul and R&B, and being a little bit commercial also helped us. A lot of humor, a lot of nice slow songs and being able to play kind of brought us a foundation.

Retrospective reviews
Review scores
Source	Rating
AllMusic	4.5/5 stars
Christgau's Consumer Guide	(1-star Honorable Mention)
Encyclopedia of Popular Music	3/5 stars
MusicHound R&B	5/5
The New Rolling Stone Album Guide	4.5/5 stars

D'wayne Wiggins cited Sons of Soul as his favorite album with the group. Vibe and the Philadelphia Daily News also viewed it as the group's best album; the latter wrote that "it may be the project that got the public's ears ready for all the similarly soulful artists yet to come." AllMusic editor Stephen Thomas Erlewine felt that they "received their greatest chart success, without compromising their music", which "was still the finely crafted, highly eclectic and funky pop-soul that distinguished their first two albums," but with improved songwriting and playing. Rickey Wright of the Washington City Paper regarded the album as a "hyperactively brilliant" showcase for "deeply resourceful songwriters who kept up with their audience", adding that "hardly anything in '90s R&B has touched it". In The New Rolling Stone Album Guide (2004), Franklin Soults mostly credited Raphael Wiggins for the record's success and said his "high tenor glides as smoothly and confidently as his songwriting".

== Track listing ==
All songs were produced by Tony! Toni! Toné!

No.	Title	Writer(s)	Length
1.	"If I Had No Loot"	Juan Bautista, Will Harris, Raphael Wiggins	4:01
2.	"What Goes Around Comes Around"	Carl Wheeler, D'wayne Wiggins, R. Wiggins	4:33
3.	"My Ex-Girlfriend"	Timothy Christian Riley, D. Wiggins, R. Wiggins	4:53
4.	"Tell Me Mama"	Riley, R. Wiggins, Z'Ann	4:17
5.	"Leavin'"	John Smith, R. Wiggins	5:16
6.	"Slow Wine"	D. Wiggins, The Whole 9	4:49
7.	"(Lay Your Head on My) Pillow"	Riley, D. Wiggins, R. Wiggins	6:12
8.	"I Couldn't Keep It to Myself"	R. Wiggins	5:20
9.	"Gangsta Groove"	Smith, D. Wiggins, R. Wiggins	5:03
10.	"Tonyies! In the Wrong Key"	Riley, R. Wiggins	4:05
11.	"Dance Hall"	Curtis Grant, D. Wiggins	4:26
12.	"Times Squares 2:30 A.M. (Segue)"		0:33
13.	"Fun"	Riley, Wheeler, D. Wiggins, R. Wiggins	5:16
14.	"Anniversary"	Wheeler, R. Wiggins	9:24
15.	"Castleers"	Wheeler, R. Wiggins	1:19

Notes

- "Leavin'" contains a sample of "If the Papes Come" by A Tribe Called Quest.
- "What Goes Around Comes Around" and "Dance Hall" feature raps by Trinidadian recording artist General Grant.

== Personnel ==
Credits are adapted from the album's liner notes.

=== Tony! Toni! Toné! ===
- Timothy Christian Riley – drum programming, drums, horn synthesizer, keyboards, producer, programming, synthesizer
- D'wayne Wiggins – bass, drum programming, drums, guitar, producer, programming
- Raphael Wiggins – bass, bass synthesizer, drum programming, drums, keyboards, producer

=== Additional musicians ===
- John Affoon – engineer
- Gerald Albright – saxophone
- Ray Brown – trumpet
- Peter Corant – pedal steel, steel guitar
- The Fat Lip Horns – horn
- Clare Fischer – arranger, string arrangements
- Earl Garner – trumpet
- General Grant – guest rap
- Nick Marach – acoustic guitar, guitar
- Bill Ortiz – trumpet
- Lenny Pickett – tenor saxophone
- John "Jubu" Smith – guitar, upright bass
- The SNL Horns – horns
- Norbert Stachel – woodwind
- Charles Veal – soloist, string arrangements, violin
- Carl Wheeler – keyboards
- Jon Williams – trumpet
- Benjamin Wright – string arrangements
- Frank Wright – arranger
- George Young – alto saxophone
- Reggie C. Young – trombone

=== Production ===
- Ali Shaheed Muhammad – programming
- Enrique Badulescu – photography
- Gerry Brown – engineer, mixing
- Joe Capers – engineer
- Brian Carrigan – engineer
- Ed Eckstine – executive producer
- Andy Grassi – engineer
- Dave Jahnsen – engineer
- Anthony Jeffries – engineer
- Ken Kessie – mixing
- Kelle Kutsugeras – costume design
- L.A. Jae – programming
- Craig Long – engineer
- Bill Malina – engineer
- Neil Perry – engineer
- Phase 5 – programming
- Sean Pollard – engineer
- Bob Power – mixing
- Herb Powers – mastering
- Aaron Rudden – engineer
- Mike Scapelli – engineer
- Kirt Shearer – engineer, programming
- Maurice Stewart – programming
- Mark Sullivan – production coordination, project coordinator
- Terry T. – programming
- Kenneth A. Van Druten – engineer

== Charts ==
=== Weekly charts ===
Chart (1993)	Peak position
Australian Albums (ARIA)	68
Canadian Albums (RPM)	70
UK Albums (OCC)	66
US Billboard 200	24
US Top R&B/Hip-Hop Albums (Billboard)	3

=== Year-end charts ===
Chart (1993)	Position
US Billboard 200	93
US Top R&B/Hip-Hop Albums (Billboard)	16
Chart (1994)	Position
US Top R&B/Hip-Hop Albums (Billboard)	46

== Certifications ==
Region	Certification	Certified units/sales
United States (RIAA)	2× Platinum	2,000,000^{^}
^{^} Shipments figures based on certification alone.

== See also ==
- Plantation Lullabies

== Bibliography ==
- Bourgoin, Suzanne; LaBlanc, Michael L. (1994). Contemporary Musicians: Profiles of the People in Music. Vol. 12. Gale Research. ISBN 0-8103-8553-8.
- Eur (2002). International Who's Who in Popular Music (4th ed.). Psychology Press. ISBN 1-85743-161-8.
- Hildebrand, Lee (1994). Stars of Soul and Rhythm & Blues: Top Recording Artists and Showstopping Performers, From Memphis and Motown to Now (5th ed.). Billboard Books. ISBN 0-8230-7633-4.
- Lazerine, Cameron; Lazerine, Devin (2008). Rap-Up: The Ultimate Guide to Hip-Hop and R&B. Hachette Digital. ISBN 978-0-446-17820-4.
- Soults, Franklin (2004). "Tony! Toni! Toné!". In Brackett, Nathan; Hoard, Christian (eds.). The New Rolling Stone Album Guide (4th ed.). Simon & Schuster. ISBN 0-7432-0169-8.
