= If I Had No Loot =

1993 single by Tony! Toni! Toné!

- US retail 12-inch single artworkUS retail vinyl single

Single by Tony! Toni! Toné!

from the album Sons of Soul
- Released: June 1, 1993
- Recorded: 1993
- Genre: New jack swing; soul; funk
- Length: 4:01
- Label: Wing; Mercury
- Songwriters: Juan Bautista; Will Harris; Raphael Wiggins; Steve Cropper; Eddie Floyd; Ice Cube; Anthony Wheaton
- Producer: Tony! Toni! Toné!

Tony! Toni! Toné! singles chronology
| "Me and You" (1991) | "If I Had No Loot" (1993) | "Anniversary" (1993) |

"If I Had No Loot" is a song by American R&B group Tony! Toni! Toné! It was released on June 1, 1993, by PolyGram and Wing Records, as the lead single from their third album, Sons of Soul (1993). The song was produced by Tony! Toni! Toné! and co-written by group member Raphael Wiggins, who said that it is about fair-weather friends. It has a new jack swing beat, pronounced guitar licks, and vocal samples from Boogie Down Productions' 1987 song "Remix for P Is Free" and Ice Cube's 1991 song "The Wrong Nigga to Fuck Wit".

The song became a hit for the group, peaking at number seven on the US Billboard Hot 100. It was certified gold by the Recording Industry Association of America (RIAA) and sold 500,000 copies in the United States. "If I Had No Loot" was named the tenth best single of 1993 by The Village Voice's annual Pazz & Jop critics' poll.

== Background ==
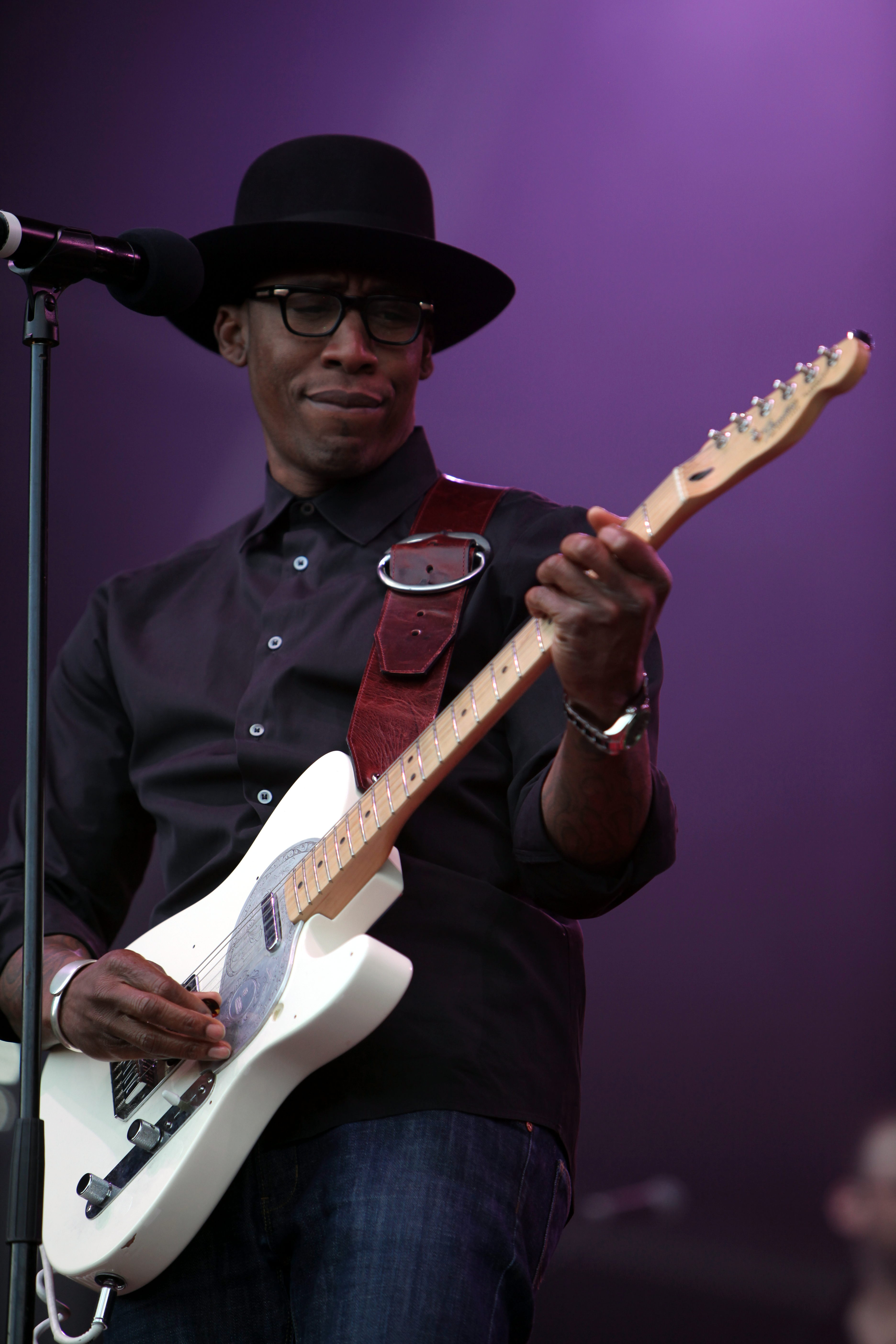
The song was co-written by Raphael Wiggins (pictured in 2011).

"If I Had No Loot" was recorded for the group's third album, Sons of Soul, which was recorded and released in 1993. The song was produced by Tony! Toni! Toné! and written by group member Raphael Wiggins, Juan Bautista, and Will Harris. Session musician John "Jubu" Smith played a Fender Telecaster on the song.

== Music and lyrics ==
"If I Had No Loot"

"If I Had No Loot" incorporates a new jack swing beat, pronounced guitar licks, and a tempo of 108 beats per minute. It has 1960s Stax southern soul influences. The song also contains vocal samples from hip hop songs, including the "da-da-da-day" chant from Boogie Down Productions' 1987 song "Remix for P Is Free" and the line "and you can new jack swing on my nuts!" from Ice Cube's 1991 song "The Wrong Nigga to Fuck Wit". According to Raphael Wiggins, the song is about "fair-weather friends" and "people who come around you for fraudulent reasons". Newsday found its theme similar to the O'Jays' 1972 song "Back Stabbers".

== Critical reception ==
Charles Aaron of Spin viewed the song as one of the group's best and called it "a splashy tour of 20th century American dance music—from jumpin' jazz to urban blues to '70s funk to hip hop." Aaron found the Ice Cube sample "irrepressible", but felt that the hook is instead "how Dwayne Wiggins's swingin', bluesy guitar becomes its own break-beat. Meet the Meters of the '90s, straight up. The Brand New Heavies aren't even close." Robert Christgau of The Village Voice cited "If I Had No Loot" as a highlight on Sons of Soul. The song was voted number 10 on The Village Voice's annual Pazz & Jop critics' poll for 1993. Music journalist Michaelangelo Matos ranked "If I Had No Loot" number 68 on his list of Top 100 Singles of the 1990s.

== Commercial performance ==
"If I Had No Loot" was released by Polygram and Wing Records on June 1, 1993, as the lead single from Sons of Soul (1993) and received frequent radio airplay. Its music video received heavy rotation on MTV and BET. The single reached number seven on the US Billboard Hot 100, on which it charted for 21 weeks. It reached its peak position on August 7, 1993. On August 11, the single was certified gold by the Recording Industry Association of America (RIAA); it sold 500,000 copies domestically.

In Canada, "If I Had No Loot" reached number 17 on the RPM 100 Hit Tracks chart, on which it charted for 16 weeks. It charted for 16 weeks and peaked at number eight in New Zealand. In Australia, the single reached number 12, spent 22 weeks in the top 100, and was certified gold.

== Personnel ==
Personnel are adapted from the US 12-inch single release.

- Tony! Toni! Toné! – production
- Gerry Brown – mixing
- Ed Eckstine – executive production
- Raphael Wiggins – co-executive production

== Charts ==
=== Weekly charts ===
| Chart (1993) | Peak position |
|---|---|
| Australia (ARIA) | 12 |
| Canada Retail Singles (The Record) | 1 |
| Canada Top Singles (RPM) | 17 |
| Canada Dance/Urban (RPM) | 4 |
| Europe (Eurochart Hot 100) | 93 |
| Europe (European Dance Radio) | 3 |
| Europe (European Hit Radio) | 37 |
| France (SNEP) | 47 |
| Germany (Media Control) | 51 |
| Iceland (Íslenski Listinn Topp 40) | 24 |
| Netherlands (Dutch Top 40) | 16 |
| Netherlands (Mega Top 50) | 19 |
| New Zealand (RIANZ) | 8 |
| UK Singles (Official Charts) | 44 |
| UK Airplay (ERA) | 45 |
| UK Club Chart (Music Week) | 39 |
| US Billboard Hot 100 | 7 |
| US Dance Club Play (Billboard) | 45 |
| US Hot R&B Singles (Billboard) | 8 |
| US Maxi-Singles Sales (Billboard) | 16 |
| US Top 40/Mainstream (Billboard) | 5 |
| US Cash Box Top 100 | 6 |

=== Year-end charts ===
| Chart (1993) | Position |
|---|---|
| Australia (ARIA) | 60 |
| Canada Dance/Urban (RPM) | 49 |
| Europe (European Dance Radio) | 25 |
| New Zealand (RIANZ) | 40 |
| US Billboard Hot 100 | 35 |
| US Cash Box Top 100 | 44 |

=== Decade-end charts ===
| Chart (1990–1999) | Position |
|---|---|
| Canada (Nielsen SoundScan) | 72 |

== Release history ==
| Region | Date | Format(s) | Label(s) | Ref. |
|---|---|---|---|---|
| United States | June 1, 1993 | 7-inch vinyl; 12-inch vinyl; cassette | Wing; Mercury | |
| Japan | July 7, 1993 | Mini-CD | Polydor | |
| Australia | August 16, 1993 | CD; cassette | Polydor | |
| United Kingdom | August 23, 1993 | 7-inch vinyl; 12-inch vinyl; CD | Polydor | |
