= Slow Wine =

- Cassette single cover

Single by Tony! Toni! Toné!

from the album Sons of Soul
- Released: July 19, 1994
- Recorded: 1993 at Caribbean Sound Basin in Trinidad
- Genre: R&B; soul; funk
- Length: 4:49
- Label: Mercury
- Songwriters: D'wayne Wiggins, Damon Haynes, John Rhone, Benjamin Ross, Maurice Stewart
- Producer: Tony! Toni! Toné!

Tony! Toni! Toné! singles chronology
"Leavin'" (1994)	"Slow Wine" (1994)	"Let's Get Down" (1996)

"Slow Wine" is a song by American R&B group Tony! Toni! Toné!, released on July 19, 1994, by Mercury Records and Polygram Records as the fifth and final single from their 1993 album Sons of Soul. It was recorded in 1993 at Caribbean Sound Basin in Trinidad, and the group drew on the local music scene and their recreational activities there. "Slow Wine" is a sensual R&B song that describes a Trinidadian slow grind dance.

The song was well received by music critics and received strong radio airplay. It reached number 21 on the Billboard Hot R&B Singles, on which it charted for 17 weeks.

== Background ==
Tony! Toni! Toné! recorded the song for their third album Sons of Soul, which was recorded in 1993 at Caribbean Sound Basin in Trinidad, among other studios. It was produced by the group and written by the production team The Whole 9 and guitarist D'wayne Wiggins, who sang lead. They drew on their recreational activities and the local music scene in Trinidad while working on the album there. "Slow Wine" has a sensual mood and, lyrically, describes a Trinidadian slow grind dance.

== Chart performance ==
"Slow Wine" was released on July 19, 1994, by Mercury Records and Polygram Records as a cassette single. Prior to its release, it had received strong airplay, being number one at KJLH Los Angeles and in the top five at WVAZ Chicago. On July 30, it entered the Billboard Hot R&B Singles chart at number 24 as a "Hot Shot Debut". "Slow Wine" peaked at number 21 on the chart in the week of August 6. It spent 17 weeks on Hot R&B Singles.

== Critical reception ==
Elysa Gardner of Vibe called the song a "lovely, tender come-on". Billboard wrote that it "can cut it" at both R&B and pop radio formats, as well as adult contemporary. In a review of Sons of Soul, Derek Ali of the Dayton Daily News cited "Slow Wine" as one of the "gems on this jewel of an album."

== Music video ==
In July 1994, the song's music video was filmed in San Francisco and produced by Nicole Hirsch. Group member Raphael Wiggins did not appear in the video and was replaced by a look-alike. Vibe magazine speculated whether this signalled the dissolution of Tony! Toni! Toné!.

== Charts ==
Chart (1994)	Peak position
U.S. Hot R&B Singles (Billboard)	21
