= Who? (album) =

1988 studio album by Tony! Toni! Toné

Studio album by Tony! Toni! Toné!
- Released: April 18, 1988
- Studios: Moon Studios, Sacramento
- Genres: R&B, new jack swing, soul
- Length: 44:26
- Labels: Wing, Mercury
- Producers: Denzil Foster, Thomas McElroy

Tony! Toni! Toné! chronology
| Who? (1988) | The Revival (1990) |

Singles from Who?
- 1. "Little Walter" Released: July 13, 1988; 2. "Born Not to Know" Released: 1988; 3. "Baby Doll" Released: October 1988; 4. "For the Love of You" Released: March 1989

Who? is the debut album by American R&B band Tony! Toni! Toné! It was released on April 18, 1988, by Wing Records and produced by Foster & McElroy, friends of the band from their hometown of Oakland, California. The album was recorded at Moon Studios in Sacramento.

The album received mixed reviews from critics and was a modest commercial success, reaching number 69 on the Billboard Top Pop Albums, on which it charted for 44 weeks. Its lead single, "Little Walter", became a number-one R&B hit. Who? was eventually certified gold by the Recording Industry Association of America and reached 700,000 copies sold by 1993.

== Recording and production ==
"261.5"
A 30-second sample of the song

Tony! Toni! Toné! recorded Who? at Moon Studios in Sacramento. with producers Foster & McElroy, who were friends of the band from their hometown of Oakland. Foster & McElroy's production used contemporary hip hop and new jack swing sounds that accompanied the band's older soul music background. On "Baby Doll" and "For the Love of You", Tony! Toni! Toné! sang harmonies over the producers' drum machine tracks.

The band also incorporated more eccentric elements to the music. For "Little Walter", they appropriated the melody from Ramsey Lewis' 1966 pop-jazz instrumental hit "Wade in the Water". The lyrics to "261.5" were written with reference to California Penal Code Section 261.5, the state's statutory rape law.

== Release and sales ==
Who? was released on April 18, 1988, by Wing Records. A modest success, it charted for 44 weeks on the Billboard Top Pop Albums, peaking at number 69. The lead single "Little Walter" became an R&B hit and also received considerable pop airplay. On December 5, 1989, the album was certified gold by the Recording Industry Association of America (RIAA), for shipments of 500,000 copies in the United States. By August 1993, it had sold over 700,000 copies in the US.

== Critical reception ==
Professional ratings
Review scores
| Source | Rating |
|---|---|
| AllMusic | 3/5 stars |
| The Encyclopedia of Popular Music | 3/5 stars |
| The Philadelphia Inquirer | 2/4 stars |
| The Rolling Stone Album Guide | 2.5/5 stars |

Reviewing for The Philadelphia Inquirer in May 1988, Ken Tucker appraised Who? as "fairly conventional pop rhythms attractively crooned", but applauded the music's "odd influence". Joe Brown from The Washington Post found the group's voices unimpressive and said, "while their very basic harmonizing over the spartan drum-machine patterns on 'Baby Doll' and 'For the Love of You' are probably serviceable on the dance floor, they'd be deadly dull from a concert seat".

In a retrospective review, AllMusic editor Ron Wynn believed the group "made a quick and lasting impact with" the album, particularly with its single "Little Walter". In The Rolling Stone Album Guide (2004), Fred Schuers said "Little Walter" and "Born Not to Know" revealed the group's "wit", but "these moments are so pointed they leave the disc's love ballads sounding flat". Yahoo! Music's Scott Wilson commented that it was "a very solid debut, with the groundwork for what would follow, but they're just getting their bearings. Did spawn a number one R&B hit with 'Little Walter', but not the juggernauts their later work would be".

== Track listing ==
All songs were written by Denzil Foster, Thomas McElroy, Timothy Christian Riley, Raphael Wiggins and D'Wayne Wiggins, except where noted.

1. "Baby Doll" – 5:40
2. "For the Love of You" – 5:29
3. "Who's Lovin' You" – 4:17
4. "Born Not to Know" (Denzil Foster, Thomas McElroy) – 4:42
5. "Little Walter" – 4:50
6. "Love Struck" – 4:29
7. "Pain" (Timothy Christian Riley, Raphael Wiggins, D'Wayne Wiggins) – 5:40
8. "261.5" (Timothy Christian Riley, Raphael Wiggins, D'Wayne Wiggins) – 4:04
9. "Not Gonna Cry for You" (Antron Haile) – 5:15

== Personnel ==
Credits are adapted from the album's liner notes.

=== Tony! Toni! Toné! ===
- Tim Christian – drums
- D'Wayne Wiggins – guitar, vocals
- Raphael Wiggins – bass, vocals

=== Additional personnel ===
- Elijah Baker – musician
- Michael Bays – art direction
- Ed Eckstine – executive producer
- Denzil Foster – arranger, producer
- Antron Haile – musician
- David Houston – engineer
- Ken Kessie – mixing
- David Lombard – executive producer
- Thomas McElroy – arranger, producer
- Herb Powers – mastering
- Jennifer Reiley – photography
- C. Thompson – design
- Carl Wheeler – musician

== Charts ==
Chart performance for Who?
| Chart (1988) | Peak position |
|---|---|
| US Billboard Top Pop Albums | 69 |
| US Billboard Top Black Albums | 14 |

=== Singles ===
Chart performance for singles from Who?
| Song | Chart (1988–1989) | Peak position |
|---|---|---|
| "Little Walter" | US Billboard Hot 100 | 47 |
| "Little Walter" | US Billboard Hot Black Singles | 1 |
| "Born Not to Know" | US Billboard Hot Black Singles | 4 |
| "Baby Doll" | US Billboard Hot Black Singles | 5 |
| "Baby Doll" | US Billboard Hot Dance Club Play | 44 |
| "For the Love of You" | US Billboard Hot Black Singles | 6 |

== Bibliography ==
- Nathan Brackett, Christian Hoard (2004). The New Rolling Stone Album Guide: Completely Revised and Updated 4th Edition. Simon and Schuster. ISBN 0-7432-0169-8.
