= New Jack Reunion Tour =

2006 concert tour

- Tour by Guy, BLACKstreet, Tony! Toni! Toné!, After 7, SWV
- Start date: February 24, 2006
- End date: November 18, 2006

The New Jack Reunion Tour, sometimes referred to as the New Jack Swing Reunion Tour, was a 2006 concert tour package that featured members of the 1990s music genre "new jack swing", the architect of which was Teddy Riley.

The tour was organized by Riley and was intended as the springboard for a new jack swing revival. The tour also reflected, per the Cleveland Scene newspaper, some nostalgic interest in 1990s culture. The performers of the New Jack Reunion Tour included the Riley-founded bands Guy and BLACKstreet, as well as Tony! Toni! Toné!, After 7, and SWV. The new jack genre had been influential via the subsequent work of various artists, but the tour was considered a celebration of the original form of that form. Mark Middleton of BLACKstreet stated that the goal of the tour was to appeal to a range of age groups, from teenagers to 40-year-olds, using the virtue of New Jack's musical foundations: "You have the younger artists doing R&B and hip-hop, but the level of musicianship and performance has gone down since '96. I think people want to hear good music and real singing [again]."

The tour began on February 24 at the Atlanta Civic Center and concluded on November 18 at the Richmond Coliseum. In between, it played both theatres and arenas, including high-profile venues such as Madison Square Garden in New York City.

A review in The Philadelphia Inquirer of the tour's show at the Liacouras Center in North Philadelphia described the show as nostalgic but high in energy, with the "strong, soulful voices" of the various acts augmented by a "synth-heavy live band that was smooth without being slick."

The tour was credited with reviving the commercial fortunes of Tony! Toni! Toné! That group was featured on another New Jack Reunion Tour a year later, which had a revised artist lineup.
