= Timothy Christian Riley =

American musical artist (born 1965)

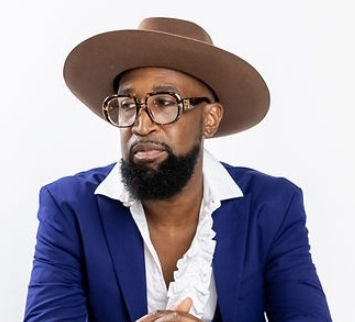

Background information
- Born: Timothy Christian Riley; December 10, 1965 (age 60); Oakland, California, U.S.
- Instruments: Drums; keyboards; vocals
- Member of: Tony! Toni! Toné!

Timothy Christian Riley (born December 10, 1965) is an American drummer, keyboardist, and singer best known for being a member of the 1990s soul/R&B group Tony! Toni! Toné!.

== Early life ==
Riley was born on December 10, 1965 in Oakland, California where he attended Castlemont High School. He is the cousin of D'wayne Wiggins and Raphael Saadiq. He sang in choir at school and played drums at church.

== Early career and Tony! Toni! Toné! ==
Due to Riley having an interest in music, he was chosen by his cousins to be in their band and he continued to play drums in church even after achieving fame. The group has 14 Billboard-charting R&B singles, including five number one hits, three Top Ten pop singles, one gold album, two platinum albums and one double platinum album. They sold over six million albums during their career together. In 2006, Tony! Toni! Toné! was included in the New Jack Reunion Tour lineup. The group has toured internationally since 1998 and continues to perform on tours today. Riley described this atmosphere of constant jamming in Rolling Stone as "like in the neighborhood, there was always competitions. I mean, it would be like school talent shows, and you'd come home from school, and there would be like five or six drummers in their houses playing. Everyone just played, and you had to stay on top of it,".

== Music ==
Riley worked on songs for the album, House of Music, independently before recording them together as a group. Eventually, Raphael Saadiq left the band and was replaced by Amir Khalil. He and the other group members worked on songwriting and production for other recording artists during the band's hiatus, including D'Angelo, En Vogue, Karyn White, Tevin Campbell, and A Tribe Called Quest.

== Film and TV ==
Riley appeared on Saturday Night Live with the rest of Tony! Toni! Toné! in 1993. He served as a contributor to the soundtrack of High School High, A Thin Line Between Love and Hate, Pose, Boyz n the Hood, Poetic Justice, House Party 2, Jason's Lyric, and Insecure.

== Current projects ==
Riley continues to be active as the percussionist of Tony! Toni! Toné!
