= Anniversary (Tony! Toni! Toné! song) =

Single by Tony! Toni! Toné!

from the album Sons of Soul
- Released: September 14, 1993
- Recorded: 1993
- Genre: R&B; soul; funk
- Length: 9:27 (album version); 3:57 (radio edit)
- Label: Mercury; Polygram
- Songwriters: Carl Wheeler; Raphael Wiggins
- Producer: Tony! Toni! Toné!

Tony! Toni! Toné! singles chronology
"If I Had No Loot" (1993)	"Anniversary" (1993)	"(Lay Your Head on My) Pillow" (1994)

Music video
- "Anniversary" on YouTube

"Anniversary" is a song by American R&B group Tony! Toni! Toné!. It was released on September 14, 1993, by Mercury and Polygram, as the second single from their third studio album, Sons of Soul (1993). The song was produced by Tony! Toni! Toné! and written by group member Raphael Wiggins and keyboardist Carl Wheeler. It became a hit for Tony! Toni! Toné!, peaking at numbers ten and seven on the US Billboard Hot 100 and Cash Box Top 100, and number two on the Billboard Hot R&B Singles chart. The single was certified gold by the Recording Industry Association of America (RIAA), for shipments of 500,000 copies in the United States. "Anniversary" was well received by music critics, including Robert Christgau, who named it the 13th best song of 1993. It earned the group Grammy Award nominations for Best R&B Song and Best R&B Performance by a Duo or Group with Vocals in 1994. The accompanying music video was nominated for Best Clip of the Year in the category for R&B/Urban at the 1994 Billboard Music Video Awards.

== Music and lyrics ==
"Anniversary"
The romantic slow jam has elements of bolero and lyrics bestowing warmth and respect upon its female subject.

"Anniversary" was recorded for the group's third album Sons of Soul, which was recorded and released in 1993. It was produced by Tony! Toni! Toné! and written by group member Raphael Wiggins and keyboardist Carl Wheeler.

The song is a romantic, elegant slow jam, with lush strings, lavish vocal harmonies, moody violin, and a long instrumental break. Musically, the group wanted to create a feeling similar to Isaac Hayes' 1969 song "By the Time I Get to Phoenix". Its lyrics are about mature, lasting love: "I've only made plans to hold your little hand/ It's our anniversary." Molly Reed of The Times-Picayune views that the lyrics' "pure sentiment" evokes "the 'sugar pie, honey bun' days of Motown soul", citing the line "I've only made plans / to hold your little hand / It's our anniversary".

== Chart performance ==
"Anniversary" was released by Mercury and Polygram Records on September 14, 1993. It received considerable radio exposure and sales in the United States. In the week of September 29, it climbed from number 84 to number 44 on the US Billboard Hot 100, making it one of the singles with the widest radio exposure and the greatest sales gains. "Anniversary" spent 20 weeks on the chart, peaking at number 10 on October 23. Its music video was released in October and featured the group in attire associated with English Romanticism and dandyism, including Dolce & Gabbana velvet vests, pin-striped jackets, lace bows, and cuffed shirts. On November 17, 1993, the single was certified gold by the Recording Industry Association of America (RIAA).

In Canada, "Anniversary" charted for nine weeks and peaked at number 44 on January 17, 1994. In New Zealand, it charted for eight weeks and peaked at number 16. In Australia, it charted for 8 weeks and peaked at number 70.

== Critical reception ==
Pan-European magazine Music & Media wrote, "Stevie Wonder means as much to the Tonies as to Jamiroquai. Inattentive lovers will learn to care from this hard to forget delicate ballad." Jonathan Bernstein of Spin named it "a song for all seasons." Elysa Gardner of Vibe wrote that "Sons of Soul climaxes, so to speak, with [the song]", saying the romantic slow jam has elements of bolero and lyrics bestowing warmth and respect upon its female subject. Robert Christgau of The Village Voice also cited it as a highlight on the album. He later ranked the song number 13 on his list of the year's best singles. In 1994, "Anniversary" was nominated for Grammy Awards for Best R&B Song and Best R&B Performance by a Duo or Group with Vocals. However, it lost to Janet Jackson's "That's the Way Love Goes" (1993) and Sade's "No Ordinary Love" (1992), respectively, at the 36th Grammy Awards.

== Personnel ==
Credits adapted from 7-inch pressing (Wing #859566).

- Tony! Toni! Toné! – arranger, producer
- Clare Fischer – string arrangement
- Gerry Brown – mixing
- Ed Eckstine – executive producer
- Enrique Badulescu – photography
- Jubu Smith - Guitar

== Other versions ==
An instrumental version of the song was covered by jazz saxophonist Gerald Albright on his 1994 album, Smooth.

== Charts ==
=== Weekly charts ===
Chart (1993–1994)	Peak position
Australia (ARIA)	70
Canada Retail Singles (The Record)	5
Canada Top Singles (RPM)	44
Europe (European Dance Radio)	16
New Zealand (RIANZ)	16
US Billboard Hot 100	10
US Hot R&B/Hip-Hop Songs (Billboard)	2
US Pop Airplay (Billboard)	20
US Cash Box Top 100	7

=== Year-end charts ===
Chart (1993)	Position
US Hot R&B/Hip-Hop Songs (Billboard)	44

Chart (1994)	Position
US Hot R&B/Hip-Hop Songs (Billboard)	80
