= Born Not to Know =

1988 single by Tony! Toni! Toné!

Single by Tony! Toni! Toné!

from the album Who?
- B-side: "Catch My Breath"
- Released: July 4, 1988
- Recorded: 1987
- Genre: R&B
- Length: 4:42
- Label: Wing
- Songwriter(s): Denzil Foster; Thomas McElroy
- Producer(s): Denzil Foster; Thomas McElroy

Tony! Toni! Toné! singles chronology
"Little Walter" (1988)	"Born Not to Know" (1988)	"Baby Doll" (1988)

Music video
- "Born Not to Know" on YouTube

"Born Not to Know" is a song performed by American contemporary R&B group Tony! Toni! Toné!, issued as the second single from their debut album, Who? The song peaked at #4 on the Billboard R&B chart in 1988.

== Charts ==
Chart performance for "Born Not to Know"
Chart (1988)	Peak position
US Hot Dance Music/Maxi-Singles Sales (Billboard)	45
US Hot R&B/Hip-Hop Singles & Tracks (Billboard)	4
