= Let's Get Down (Tony! Toni! Toné! song) =

Single by Tony! Toni! Toné! featuring DJ Quik

from the album House of Music
- Released: October 28, 1996
- Recorded: 1995–1996
- Genre: New Jack Swing - R&B - Funk
- Length: 4:57
- Label: Mercury
- Songwriters: George Archie; David Blake; Raphael Saadiq; Elijah Baker
- Producers: Raphael Saadiq; DJ Quik; G-One

Tony! Toni! Toné! singles chronology
"Slow Wine" (1994)	"Let's Get Down" (1996)	"Thinking of You" (1997)

DJ Quik singles chronology
"Safe + Sound" (1995)	"Let's Get Down" (1996)	"Strait Playin'" (1997)

Music video
- "Let's Get Down" on YouTube

"Let's Get Down" is a song recorded by American R&B group Tony! Toni! Toné! for their fourth studio album House of Music (1996). It was written by Raphael Saadiq, DJ Quik, and George Archie. The song was produced by Saadiq with DJ Quik and G-One. "Let's Get Down" was released as the lead single from House of Music and was sent to R&B and crossover radio on October 28, 1996.

== Music and lyrics ==
"Let's Get Down" features a gentle funk groove with a repeating acoustic guitar figure. The song has a party theme and silky vocals by Tony! Toni! Toné!, alternated by DJ Quik's streetwise rapping. The songs chorus features an interpolation of "Smells Like Teen Spirit" by Nirvana.

== Live performances ==
The group performed the song on the Late Show with David Letterman in 1996.

== Music video ==
The official music video was directed by Joseph Kahn and partially filmed at the Bradbury Building in Los Angeles.

== Track listings ==
US CD single

1. "Let's Get Down" (Without Rap) – 3:52
2. "It's a Beautiful Thing" – 4:35

UK CD single

1. "Let's Get Down" (Without Rap) – 3:52
2. "It's a Beautiful Thing" – 4:35
3. "Til Last Summer" – 5:11
4. "Let's Get Down" (featuring DJ Quik) – 3:52

UK vinyl 12" pressing

1. "Let's Get Down" (Satoshi Tomiie Oil Shock Mix) – 9:00
2. "Let's Get Down" (X-Mix Radio Edit) – 4:03
3. "Let's Get Down" (Vission Lorimer Euphoria Mix) – 4:35
4. "Let's Get Down" (Satoshi Tomiie Dramatized Club Mix) – 8:30

== Charts ==
=== Weekly charts ===
Weekly chart performance for "Let's Get Down"
Chart (1996)	Peak position
New Zealand Singles Chart	8
UK Singles Chart	33
US Billboard Hot 100 Airplay	30
US Billboard Billboard Hot R&B Airplay	4

=== Year-end charts ===
Year-end chart performance for "Let's Get Down"
Chart (1997)	Position
New Zealand (Recorded Music NZ)	41
