= Little Walter (song) =

1988 single by Tony! Toni! Toné!

Single by Tony! Toni! Toné!

from the album Who?
- Released: May 13, 1988
- Recorded: 1986 (as demo); 1988 (as a song)
- Genre: New jack swing
- Length: 4:50
- Label: Wing
- Songwriter(s): Denzil Foster, Thomas McElroy, Timothy Riley, Raphael Saadiq, D'Wayne Wiggins
- Producer(s): Foster & McElroy

Tony! Toni! Toné! singles chronology
"Little Walter" (1988)	"Born Not to Know" (1988)

"Little Walter" is the debut single by Tony! Toni! Toné!. It was the lead single from the R&B group's debut album Who.

== Background ==
The narrator in the song describes a roommate by the name of Walter who makes money from an undisclosed job, and rather than pay rent, he spends his money on a lavish lifestyle. The narrator has had enough of this, and decides to confront Walter about it only for both to break into an argument that lasts "half the night". When the argument was finished "there was a knock at the door and when Walter went to open it he was blown to the floor" meaning he may have been shot dead (according to the video for the song). Walter was portrayed by comedian Sinbad in the video.

The melody is taken from the instrumentation on the spiritual tune "Wade in the Water".

== Chart performance ==
"Little Walter" spent one week at number one on the U.S. Soul chart. It also peaked at forty-seven on the Billboard Hot 100.

Chart (1988)	Peak position
US Billboard Hot 100	47
US "Billboard" Hot Dance Music-Club Play	43
US Billboard Hot Black Singles	1
