= Gerry Brown =

- Born: Gerald E. Brown
- Origin: Los Angeles, California, U.S.
- Genres: R&B; jazz; pop; rock
- Occupations: Recording engineer; mixing engineer; record producer

Gerald E. "The Gov" Brown (also known as Gerry Brown; born 1958) is a recording engineer, mixer and music producer based in Los Angeles, best known for his work with artists including Whitney Houston, John Legend, Earth, Wind & Fire, Madonna, Sting, Prince, Phil Collins, Marcus Miller, Wayne Shorter and Victor Wooten. He is credited on multiple RIAA Gold and Platinum certified albums.

== Awards ==
Brown has won 3 Grammy awards, one in the Best Contemporary Jazz Album category for his work as a producer and engineer on Stanley Clarke's 2010 album The Stanley Clarke Band and another one in the Best R&B Album category for his work as an engineer on John Legend's 2020 album Bigger Love. He also won a Billboard Award for his work as a producer on the 1993 single “Love Is” by Vanessa Williams and Brian McKnight.

== Early life and career ==
Brown's interest in recording technology started at a young age. At age 5, he received a tape recorder as a gift, which he used to record sounds around him. During his teenage years, Brown played the trombone for the Los Angeles High School band. The school band director invited Brown to work at his home studio and continued to mentor him in recording engineering after graduating high school. Brown was also raised Catholic and experienced choir music at his local parish.

Brown obtained a degree at Sound Masters Recording Engineer School. In 1977, he started working at ABC Recording Studios in Los Angeles, organizing the studio's magnetic tapes. The studio was later known by the names Scott-Sunstorm Recording Studios, Concorde Recording Center and then Lion Share Studios. Six months after he started working at Concorde, Brown was promoted to assistant engineer. There, he engineered Debra Law's album Very Special, produced by Ronnie Laws and Hubert Laws. Brown later became a freelance engineer in 1982.

In 1988, Ed Eckstein, who at the time was president of Wing Records, hired Brown to mix the single "Lay Your Troubles Down" by Angela Winbush and Ronald Isley. The song peaked at Nr. 10 on the Billboard Hot R&B/Hip-Hop Songs chart. In 1991, Brown worked on Vanessa William's album The Comfort Zone for PolyGram. Brown continued working with Eckstein and moved to New York in 1992 when Eckstein became co-president of PolyGram. While in New York, Brown also worked on singles for Capitol Records. He returned to Los Angeles in 1996.

Brown engineered and mixed tracks on Alicia Keys' 2001 album Songs in A Minor. Ahmir "Questlove" Thompson was recording at the studio next to Brown. Questlove describes Brown's recording sessions: "Gerry is world famous for his all-year-round Christmas decorations during his sessions".

Brown currently works with engineer Bobby Campbell under the name "Mixed by Humanz". They mixed John Legend's 2020 album Bigger Love, produced during the COVID-19 pandemic. Because of the mobility limitations due to the pandemic, Brown mixed at Bernadette Cooper's Museum68 studios and Campbell mixed the album at his home studios, working remotely.

== Selected credits ==
=== Albums and singles ===
| Year | Album/Single | Artist | Role |
|---|---|---|---|
| 1971 | Salisbury | Uriah Heep | Producer |
| 1978 | Here, My Dear | Marvin Gaye | Producer, engineer, mixer |
| 1980 | Don't Look Back | Natalie Cole | Engineer, remixer |
| 1981 | Very Special | Debra Laws | Engineer |
| 1987 | Circumstantial Evidence | Shalamar | Engineer |
| 1988 | "The Right Stuff" | Vanessa Williams | Engineer, mixer |
| 1988 | "Silhouette" | Kenny G | Engineer |
| 1989 | Kenny G Live | Kenny G | Engineer |
| 1990 | The Revival | Tony! Toni! Toné! | Engineer, Mixer |
| 1991 | The Comfort Zone | Vanessa Williams | Producer, vocal arranger, engineer, mixer |
| 1992 | Mastertouch | Torsten de Winkel | Engineer |
| 1992 | Brian McKnight | Brian McKnight | Producer, composer, background vocals, engineer, mixer |
| 1992 | Beverly Hills, 90210 Original TV Soundtrack | - | Producer |
| 1993 | Sons of Soul | Tony! Toni! Toné! | Engineer, mixer |
| 1994 | Storyteller | Crystal Waters | Engineer |
| 1994 | Sweetest Days | Vanessa Williams | Producer, composer, arranger, mixer |
| 1996 | Star Bright | Vanessa Williams | Producer, arranger, engineer |
| 1996 | House of Music | Tony! Toni! Toné! | Engineer, mixer |
| 1997 | Still Waters | Bee Gees | Engineer, mixer |
| 1997 | Lo Mejor de Mí | Cristian Castro | Engineer |
| 1998 | Never Say Never | Brandy | Mixer |
| 1999 | "Almost Doesn't Count" | Brandy | Mixer |
| 2001 | Songs in A Minor | Alicia Keys | Engineer, Mixer |
| 2002 | 3D | TLC | Mixer |
| 2003 | All Hits at the House of Blues | Raphael Saadiq | Engineer |
| 2004 | Complex Simplicity | Teedra Moses | Engineer |
| 2005 | Illumination | Earth, Wind & Fire | Engineer |
| 2007 | The Toys of Men | Stanley Clarke | Engineer |
| 2008 | Thunder | SMV | Engineer, mixer |
| 2008 | The Way I See It | Raphael Saadiq | Engineer |
| 2010 | The Stanley Clarke Band | Stanley Clarke | Producer, engineer |
| 2011 | Stone Rollin' | Raphael Saadiq | Engineer |
| 2014 | Up | Stanley Clarke | Engineer, mixer |
| 2017 | War & Leisure | Miguel | Mixer |
| 2017 | Strength of a Woman | Mary J. Blige | Engineer, mixer |
| 2018 | A Legendary Christmas | John Legend | Mixer |
| 2019 | Jimmy Lee | Raphael Saadiq | Engineer |
| 2020 | Bigger Love | John Legend | Mixer |
