= Virtual press conference =

A virtual press conference is a type of virtual event much like a news conference. It is a conference where the speaker is sitting in a chair in a studio for example whilst the video and audio are relayed via satellite to another location.

Journalists call into the conference to ask their questions. This saves time and money for the personality being interviewed as there is no need for them to move from one location to another. This is used more and more frequently, for example during times of crisis when organizations use their communications department to keep people informed.
