= Weekends at the D.L. =

American television series

Weekends at the D.L. is a talk show on Comedy Central, created in July 2005. In a typical episode, host D. L. Hughley entertains guests around a coffee table, where they drink wine and smoke stogies on the D.L. Comedy skits, both live and in the form of short video clips, were also featured in the program.

The show aired Friday and Saturday at 10PM EST until January 2006, when it was canceled due to low ratings.
