= Tony! Toni! Toné! =

American soul/R&B band from Oakland, California

- Tony! Toni! Toné! photographed in 1988; D'Wayne Wiggins (left), Timothy Christian Riley (top right), and Raphael Saadiq (bottom)

Background information
- Origin: Oakland, California, U.S.
- Genres: R&B; progressive soul
- Works: Tony! Toni! Toné! discography
- Years active: 1986–present
- Labels: Grass Roots Entertainment; Wing; Mercury Records
- Spinoffs: 3TOB; Black Men United; Lucy Pearl
- Past members: Raphael Saadiq; Timothy Christian Riley; D'Wayne Wiggins; Elijah Baker; Antron Haile; Carl Wheeler; Jubu Smith; Amar Khalil
- Website: tonytonitone.com

Tony! Toni! Toné! is an American R&B/soul band from Oakland, California. During the band's heyday from the late 1980s to mid-1990s, it was composed of D'Wayne Wiggins on lead vocals and guitar, his brother Raphael Saadiq (born Charles Ray Wiggins) on lead vocals and bass, their cousins Timothy Christian Riley on drums, keyboards, and background vocals, Elijah Baker on keyboards and background vocals and Antron Haile on guitar and background vocals as well as their childhood friend Carl Wheeler on drums and background vocals. Originally, the band went by "Tony, Toni, Toné" as a joke, until they realized it "had a nice ring to it".

After a stint as musicians on Prince's Parade Tour in 1986, the trio formed Tony! Toni! Toné! back in their hometown of Oakland that same year. The band first found success performing around the San Francisco Bay Area. They released their debut album Who? in 1988. Their debut single, “Little Walter,” reached number 1 on the Billboard R&B chart; three more singles from the album reached the Top 10; and the album was certified gold.

Tony! Toni! Toné! started producing their own music and found more mainstream success with their second album The Revival in 1990, fueled by the No.9 Billboard Hot 100 hit "Feels Good”. The Revival also included the R&B No.1s "It Never Rains (In Southern California)" and "Whatever You Want" and was certified platinum. The group achieved their greatest commercial success with the double platinum certified and critically acclaimed Sons of Soul album in 1993, which included the Hot 100 top 10 hits "If I Had No Loot" and "Anniversary" and top 40 hit "(Lay Your Head on My) Pillow". With the group's reliance on traditional soul and R&B values of songwriting and instrumentation, Sons of Soul is considered a precursor to the neo soul movement of the late 1990s. Tony! Toni! Toné! disbanded after the release of their platinum certified fourth album House of Music (1996), which critics cite as their best work.

== History ==
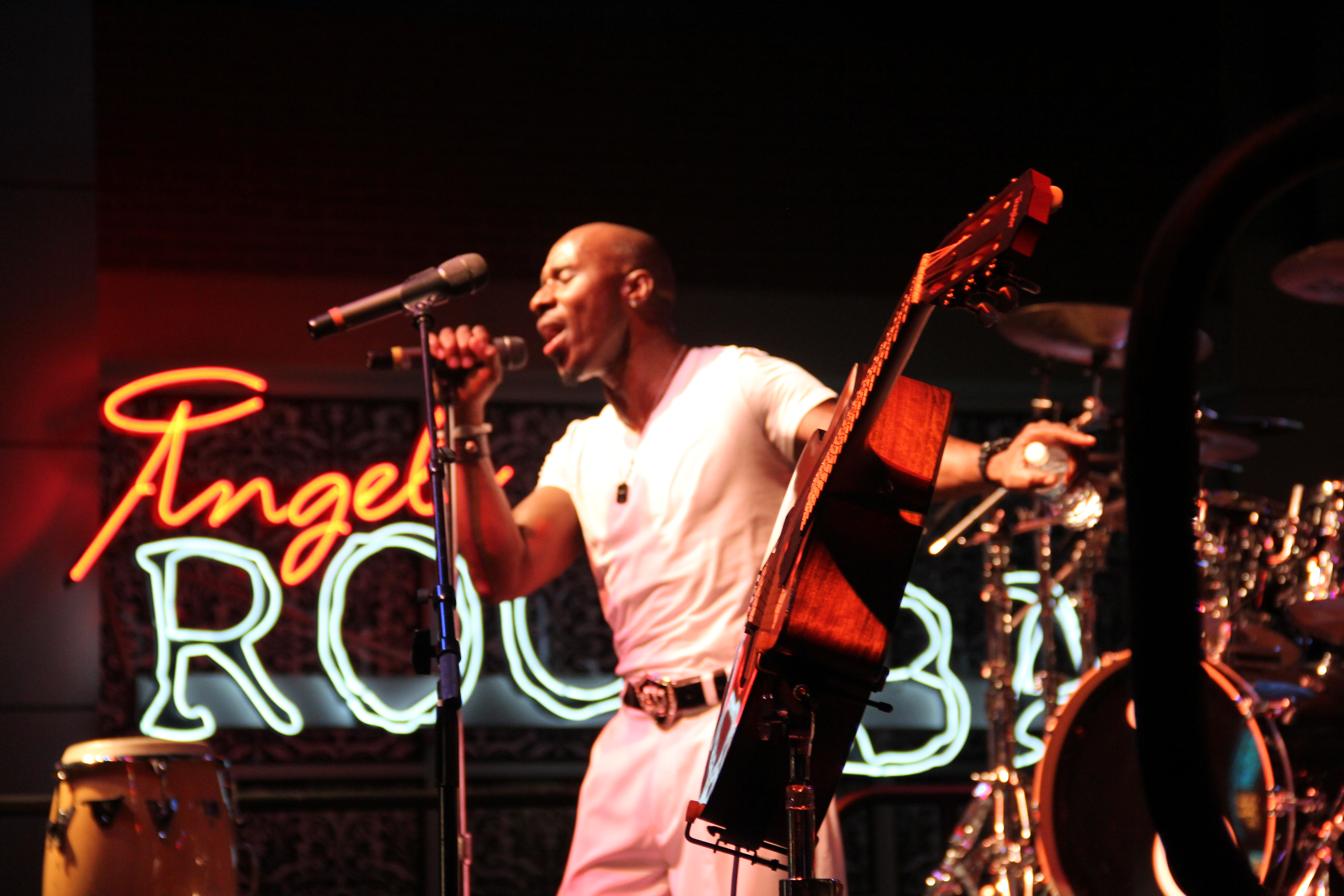
Amar Khalil of Tony! Toni! Toné! performing in Louisville, Kentucky, 2012

=== 1988–1992: Who? and The Revival ===
Their debut album, Who?, produced and co-written by Denzil Foster and Thomas McElroy, was released in 1988. The first single "Little Walter" went to number 1 on the R&B chart. The next three singles, "Born Not to Know", "Baby Doll" and "For the Love of You" were all Top 10 R&B singles. Who? spent 44 weeks on the Billboard Top Pop Albums, peaking at number 69. On December 5, 1989, the album was certified gold by the Recording Industry Association of America (RIAA), for shipments of 500,000 copies in the United States. As of August 1993, it has sold over 700,000 copies in the US.

Inspired by live instrumentation, turntablism, and classic soul music, Tony! Toni! Toné! recorded and produced their second album, The Revival, mostly themselves and released it on May 8, 1990 to commercial success. The Revival charted for 64 weeks on the Billboard Top Pop Albums, peaking at number 34 on the chart and reaching platinum status. The album spawned several number 1 R&B hits with "It Never Rains (In Southern California)", "Feels Good", "The Blues", and "Whatever You Want" all topping the R&B charts. The album's second single "Feels Good" was released on June 19 and certified gold on November 13 after it had shipped 500,000 copies. The single topped the R&B chart for two weeks and reached number nine on the Billboard Hot 100 in the fall of 1990, going on to sell over one million copies. "Feels Good" was the group's first single to breach the Top 10 of the Billboard Hot 100. In late 1990, the album's fourth single "It Never Rains (In Southern California)" became a number-one R&B hit and also peaked at number 34 on the Hot 100.

The Revival broadened the group's exposure to fans beyond their initial R&B audience. However, they became ambivalent about their newfound mainstream success and their music being labeled "retro" by critics. In an interview for People magazine, lead singer and bassist Raphael Wiggins expressed his dissatisfaction with the music industry, saying that "every record company wants to get a group and put 'em in a Benz with a car phone and a beeper, show them dressing in three different outfits, put them in a video shot on a beach with lots of swinging bikinis. You won't ever see us on a beach. We're just down-to-earth, funky, like-to-play guys." Before considering a follow-up album, the band recorded several songs for film soundtracks, including "Me and You" for Boyz n the Hood (1991), "House Party (I Don't Know What You Come to Do)" for House Party 2 (1991), and "Waiting on You" for Poetic Justice (1993).

=== 1992–1995: Sons of Soul ===
Having fulfilled their creative intentions with The Revival, Tony! Toni! Toné! wanted to pay homage to their musical influences with Sons of Soul. In a 1993 interview for The New York Times, Wiggins elaborated on their direction for the album, stating "We're paying homage to a lot of older artists who paved the way for us artists like the Temptations, Sly and the Family Stone, Earth, Wind and Fire. They're the people who inspired us when we were growing up, people like Aretha Franklin, James Brown. We feel we're the sons of everything and all those people who came before us." He also explained the album's title as a declaration of them being descendants of those artists, "not in a grandiose sense, but from the standpoint that we really are the musical offspring of all that's come before us ... paying homage to our past, but creating in a contemporary environment."

Tony! Toni! Toné! took a hiatus as a group after the commercial and critical success of Sons of Soul. According to vocalist and bassist Raphael Wiggins, each member had pursued individual music projects, and "the group was trying to figure out where everybody's time, space and head was at." He, D'wayne Wiggins, and Timothy Christian Riley worked on songwriting and production for other recording artists during the band's hiatus, including D'Angelo, En Vogue, Karyn White, Tevin Campbell, and A Tribe Called Quest. Raphael Wiggins adopted the surname "Saadiq" for his professional name in 1994—"man of his word" in Arabic—and released his solo single "Ask of You" in 1995. Their work outside the band led to rumors of a break-up during the time between albums. Tony! Toni! Toné! eventually regrouped and began recording House of Music in September 1995.

=== 1996–1998: House of Music ===
In 1996, the group released their final studio album to date, House of Music. The album lacked the strong singles of earlier entries, only getting "Thinking Of You" & "Let's Get Down" into the top 10 on the R&B charts, with "Thinking Of You" hitting number 22 on the Hot 100, though it eventually reached platinum status.

House of Music expanded on Tony! Toni! Toné!'s previous traditional R&B-influenced work by emphasizing live instrumentation and ballads. In the opinion of Daily Herald writer Dan Kening, the album continued the band's mix of contemporary R&B and old-fashioned soul, deeming it "half a tribute to their '60s and '70s soul music roots and half a masterful blend of modern smooth balladeering and danceable funk." Released on November 19, 1996, House of Music reached number 32 on the Billboard 200 and spent 31 weeks on the chart. In its first eight weeks, the album sold 318,502 copies in the US. Tony! Toni! Toné! inaugurated its release with a satellite press conference and in-store performance at a small retail outlet in the San Francisco Bay Area. They also embarked on a tour of historically black colleges and Black Independent Coalition record shops after "Let's Get Down" had been sent to R&B and crossover radio on October 28 as the album's lead single; its music video was released to outlets such as BET, The Box, and MTV. Tony! Toni! Toné! performed the song on the sketch comedy show All That; on the music variety program Soul Train, they performed "Let's Get Down" and "Annie May". "Thinking of You" was released as the second single on March 11, 1997, by which time House of Music had sold 514,000 copies, according to Nielsen SoundScan. On August 6, the album was certified Platinum by the Recording Industry Association of America (RIAA).

The single "Me & You" appears on the soundtrack to the motion picture Boyz n the Hood. Following the release of Sons of Soul, the group (except Riley) was a part of the R&B supergroup Black Men United, along with Silk and H-Town. The song "U Will Know" appeared on the soundtrack for the movie Jason's Lyric.

=== Reunions ===
In 2003, members of Tony! Toni! Toné!, except for Saadiq, were invited by Alicia Keys to be guest artists on her album The Diary of Alicia Keys. The song that resulted from that session was called "Diary". Released as a single in the fall of 2004, it gave them their first Top 10 US hit in 11 years and a nomination for Best R&B Performance by a Duo or Group with Vocals at the 2005 Grammy Awards.

In 2023, the original lineup announced and engaged in a U.S. reunion tour, marking the band's 30th anniversary of their third release, Sons of Soul, and their first tour in 25 years; that included their music catalog and a few songs from Saadiq's solo career and production/songwriting repertoire. Before the tour, the group talked about recording a new album, but as of September 2024, Raphael Saadiq revealed to Rolling Stone Now podcast that plans for another album have been canceled, stating that the band members no longer feel the same about working on an album and he doesn't think there will be another reunion.

D'Wayne Wiggins died from bladder cancer on March 7, 2025.

== Members ==
- Raphael Saadiq (1986–1997, 2019–2025)
- Timothy Christian Riley (1986–2025)
- D'Wayne Wiggins (1986–2025; his death)
- Elijah Baker (1986–1997)
- Antron Haile (1986–1997)
- Carl Wheeler (1986–1997)
- Jubu Smith (1990-1997)
- Amar Khalil (1998–2018)

== Other endeavors ==
Raphael Saadiq released his first solo effort, the Top 20 Billboard hit "Ask of You" for the Higher Learning soundtrack, in 1995. Around the same time, Saadiq became a much-sought-after R&B producer, scoring hits for D'Angelo, Beyoncé, Total, The Roots, and others. Later in the 2000s, he started a solo career, releasing two albums: Instant Vintage (2002) and Ray Ray (2004). He was replaced by Amar Khalil in the band. Regarding changing his surname to 'Saadiq' for a solo career, in February 2009 Raphael stated to writer Pete Lewis of Blues & Soul: "I just wanted to have my own identity".

Lucy Pearl was an R&B supergroup formed in 1999 as the brainchild of Saadiq. The other members of Lucy Pearl were Dawn Robinson (En Vogue) and Ali Shaheed Muhammad (A Tribe Called Quest). They released their self-titled debut album in 2000. After two singles, "Dance Tonight" and "Don't Mess with My Man", Robinson left and was replaced by Joi. The new line-up released the track "Without You". The group split up shortly afterwards, releasing no other material.

In 2005, D'Wayne Wiggins became the bandleader for the Weekends at the D.L. television show, hosted by comedian D. L. Hughley, which aired on the Comedy Central cable network until 2006. Wiggins' solo album Eyes Never Lie sold approximately 150,000 units.

== Discography ==
Studio albums

- Who? (1988)
- The Revival (1990)
- Sons of Soul (1993)
- House of Music (1996)

== See also ==
- List of number-one dance hits (United States)
- List of artists who reached number one on the US Dance chart
