= D'Wayne Wiggins =

American musical artist (1961–2025)

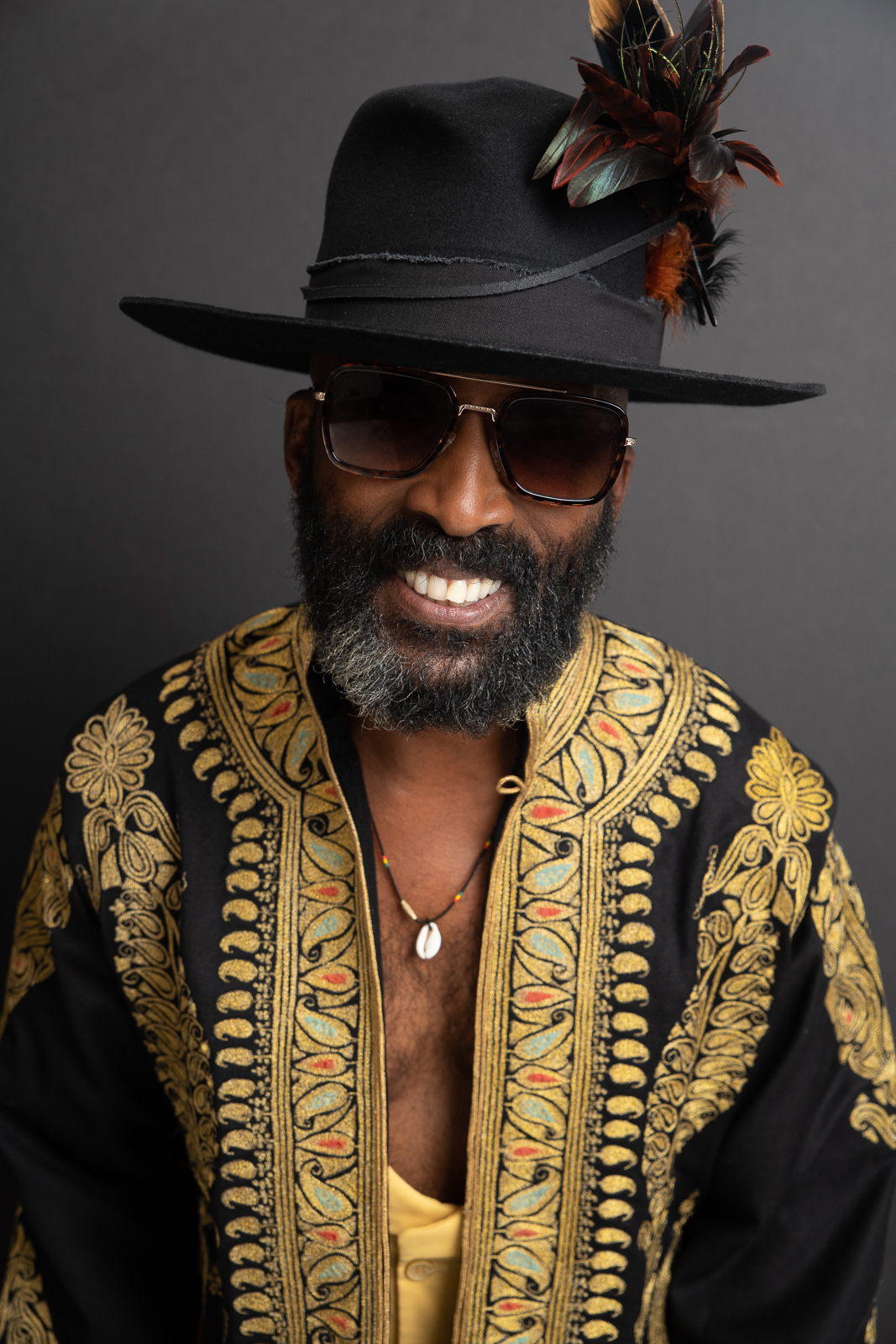
- Wiggins in 2022

Background information
- Born: D'Wayne Patrice Wiggins; February 14, 1961; Oakland, California, U.S.
- Died: March 7, 2025 (aged 64) Oakland, California, U.S.
- Occupations: Musician; singer; songwriter; record producer
- Formerly of: Tony! Toni! Toné!

D'Wayne Patrice Wiggins (February 14, 1961 – March 7, 2025) was an American singer, songwriter, guitarist and record producer best known as a founding member of the R&B/soul band Tony! Toni! Toné!. He formed Tony! Toni! Toné! in 1986 with his younger half brother, Charles Ray Wiggins (later known as Raphael Saadiq), and their cousin Timothy Christian Riley. The band achieved three platinum albums and a slew of hits in the 1980s and '90s.

Wiggins founded the company Grass Roots Entertainment in 1995, which helped develop artists such as Destiny's Child, Keyshia Cole, H.E.R., Zendaya and Kehlani. He released his debut and only solo project with Motown Records, Eyes Never Lie, in 2000.

Wiggins worked on the Alicia Keys 2003 album The Diary of Alicia Keys, winning a Grammy Award as producer. He was also the bandleader for comedian D.L. Hughley’s Comedy Central series Weekends at the D.L..

== Early life ==
Wiggins was born on February 14, 1961, in Oakland, California, to Charlie and Mary (Brown) Wiggins; specifically in the Lower Bottoms neighborhood of West Oakland. He was raised in East Oakland, where he attended Castlemont High School, graduating in 1979.

== Early career and Tony! Toni! Toné! ==
Wiggins started playing guitar at the age of 11. He played in his high school band and after graduation joined a number of bands around Oakland and eventually went on tour with Tramaine Hawkins. The Wiggins brothers and Riley worked with singer Sheena Easton and joined her on Prince's Parade Tour.

The trio decided to start their own band, Tony! Toni! Toné!, after returning to Oakland. The band has 14 Billboard-charting R&B singles, including five number one hits, three Top Ten pop singles, one gold album, two platinum albums and one double platinum album. They sold over six million albums during their career together. Finances, miscommunication and creative differences broke up the band in 1997, and Wiggins and Riley toured under the band’s name between 1998 and 2018 with Amar Khalil taking over lead singing duties. The original lineup of Tony! Toni! Toné! reunited in 2023 for a short tour.

== Music ==
Wiggins established Grass Roots Entertainment located in his West Oakland recording studio, "House of Music". Also in 1995, D’Wayne Wiggins developed and signed Destiny's Child to Grass Roots Entertainment. The group went on to become a powerhouse of female performers and the best-selling girl group of all time. He worked with the group through three albums, which have collectively sold more than 15 million copies. He also worked with artist Keyshia Cole, who resided in the “House of Music” from 1999 to 2001. Cole was mentored and received guidance from Wiggins during that time and went on to sign with A&M Records. He also worked with Laurneá of Arrested Development on her release Laurnea II and collaborated with Jody Watley. His House of Music was patronized by artists such as Alicia Keys, Beyoncé, India.Arie, Keyshia Cole, Jamie Foxx, Eddie Money and producer Scott Storch.

Wiggins released his debut and only solo project with Motown Records, Eyes Never Lie, in 2000 featuring collaborations with Darius Rucker of Hootie and the Blowfish, Jamie Foxx and Carlos Santana. This album contributed to the foundation of the neo soul genre.

Wiggins also worked with the pioneers of what is known as Oakland's “Hyphy” movement on such projects as: Too Short’s How Does It Feel and Hoochie; Messy Marv’s Blades; and The Coup’s Pick A Bigger Weapon album released in 2006. You can find his guitar skills and vocals on Ludacris’s Splash Waterfalls Remix. He also formed the group Kenya Gruv, performing Top Of The World on the Menace II Society movie soundtrack.

In 2003, Wiggins went into the studio to work with platinum artist Alicia Keys. The title track single, Diary, made Top Ten on the Billboard charts as well as the album going platinum and winning four Grammy Awards in 2005. D'Wayne Wiggins co-produced another track on the album and performed the sitar, If I Was Your Woman, winning him a Grammy for production.

== Film and television ==
In 2001, Wiggins was executive producer of the independent movie Me & Mrs. Jones and Life Is, a documentary on the life of multi-platinum music rapper Too Short. He also had an acting part in the movie Get Money in 2003.

In 2005, Wiggins was on TV arena as bandleader for the television show Weekends at the D.L., hosted by comedian D. L. Hughley, which aired on the Comedy Central cable network.

== Later life, illness and death ==
In 2000, Wiggins married the mother of his 3 children (Ilahn, Dylan, and Jaden).

Up until his death, Wiggins continued to tour as bandleader of Tony! Toni! Toné!. In 2023, Wiggins would reunite with fellow members Raphael Saadiq and Timothy Christian Riley for the Just Me and You Tour.

On March 5, 2025, Tony! Toni! Toné! revealed on Instagram that Wiggins was experiencing medical complications and that he was "working through it one day at a time". He died from bladder cancer at his home in Oakland two days later, on March 7, at the age of 64.
