= Wing Records =

American imprint record label of Mercury (1955–1996)

Wing Records was a record label subsidiary of Mercury Records founded in 1955, that found its greatest success during the late 1950s.

In 1986, the label was revived by Mercury's parent company, PolyGram and the label had brief success with R&B singers Vanessa Williams, Lace, Tony! Toni! Toné!, Channel 2, and Brian McKnight. McKnight was signed to Wing in 1989, but the album he recorded (his 1992 self-titled debut) was not released on the label. Instead, it was issued on Mercury. Jerry Murad's Harmonicats were on Wing soon after quitting Vitacoustic Records in 1948.

In 1996, Wing closed and its remaining artists (Vanessa Williams & Tony! Toni! Toné!) were moved to Mercury.

== See also ==
- List of record labels
