= List of Billboard Hot 100 top-ten singles in 1990 =

This is a list of singles that have peaked in the top 10 of the Billboard Hot 100 during 1990.

A total of 116 singles reached the top 10 in 1990, a slight decrease from 124 in the previous year, with 108 songs reaching their peaks in the year while the remaining eight either peaked in 1989 or 1991. 26 singles hit number one in 1990, while 14 singles reached number two that year.

Janet Jackson scored five top ten hits during the year with "Rhythm Nation", "Escapade", "Alright", "Come Back to Me", and "Black Cat", the most among all other artists.

== Top-ten singles ==
- (#) – 1990 Year-end top 10 single position and rank

List of Billboard Hot 100 top ten singles which peaked in 1990
Top ten entry date	Single	Artist(s)	Peak	Peak date	Weeks in top ten
Singles from 1989
December 9	"Pump Up the Jam"	Technotronic	2	January 20	9
December 16	"Rhythm Nation"	Janet Jackson	2	January 6	6
December 23	"This One's for the Children"	New Kids on the Block	7	January 6	4
Singles from 1990
January 6	"How Am I Supposed to Live Without You"	Michael Bolton	1	January 20	6
January 6	"Everything"	Jody Watley	4	January 20	5
January 13	"Just Between You and Me"	Lou Gramm	6	January 27	4
January 20	"Downtown Train"	Rod Stewart	3	January 27	5
January 20	"Free Fallin'"	Tom Petty	7	January 27	3
January 20	"Two to Make It Right"	Seduction	2	February 10	6
January 20	"Love Song"	Tesla	10	January 20	1
January 27	"Opposites Attract"	Paula Abdul with The Wild Pair	1	February 10	7
January 27	"I Remember You"	Skid Row	6	February 3	3
February 3	"Janie's Got a Gun"	Aerosmith	4	February 10	3
February 10	"What Kind of Man Would I Be?"	Chicago	5	February 24	3
February 10	"Dangerous"	Roxette	2	March 3	5
February 10	"Escapade"	Janet Jackson	1	March 3	8
February 10	"All or Nothing"	Milli Vanilli	4	February 24	4
February 17	"Tell Me Why"	Exposé	9	February 17	1
February 17	"We Can't Go Wrong"	The Cover Girls	8	March 3	3
February 24	"Roam"	The B-52's	3	March 10	5
February 24	"Here We Are"	Gloria Estefan	6	March 3	3
February 24	"Price of Love"	Bad English	5	March 10	4
March 3	"Black Velvet"	Alannah Myles	1	March 24	7
March 3	"No More Lies"	Michel'le	7	March 10	3
March 10	"I Go to Extremes"	Billy Joel	6	March 17	3
March 10	"Love Will Lead You Back"	Taylor Dayne	1	April 7	6
March 17	"I Wish It Would Rain Down"	Phil Collins	3	March 31	4
March 17	"Just a Friend"	Biz Markie	9	March 17	1
March 17	"C'mon and Get My Love"	D Mob featuring Cathy Dennis	10	March 17	1
March 24	"I'll Be Your Everything"	Tommy Page	1	April 14	5
March 24	"All Around the World"	Lisa Stansfield	3	April 7	7
March 24	"Keep It Together"	Madonna	8	March 31	2
March 24	"Get Up! (Before the Night Is Over)"	Technotronic	7	April 7	4
March 31	"Don't Wanna Fall in Love"	Jane Child	2	April 14	6
March 31	"Here and Now"	Luther Vandross	6	April 21	5
April 7	"Nothing Compares 2 U" (#3)	Sinéad O'Connor	1	April 21	10
April 7	"Forever"	Kiss	8	April 21	3
April 14	"I Wanna Be Rich"	Calloway	2	May 5	6
April 21	"How Can We Be Lovers?"	Michael Bolton	3	May 5	4
April 21	"Without You"	Mötley Crüe	8	April 28	2
April 21	"Whole Wide World"	A'me Lorain	9	April 28	2
April 28	"Whip Appeal"	Babyface	6	April 28	2
April 28	"All I Wanna Do Is Make Love to You"	Heart	2	May 26	8
May 5	"Vogue" (#5)	Madonna	1	May 19	8
May 5	"What It Takes"	Aerosmith	9	May 5	3
May 5	"Alright"	Janet Jackson	4	June 2	7
May 12	"Hold On" (#1)	Wilson Phillips	1	June 9	9
May 12	"Sending All My Love"	Linear	5	May 19	5
May 12	"Poison" (#4)	Bell Biv DeVoe	3	June 9	10
May 19	"It Must Have Been Love" (#2)	Roxette	1	June 16	9
May 26	"U Can't Touch This"	MC Hammer	8	June 16	5
May 26	"This Old Heart of Mine"	Rod Stewart with Ronald Isley	10	May 26	1
June 2	"Ooh La La (I Can't Get Over You)"	Perfect Gentlemen	10	June 2	1
June 9	"Step by Step"	New Kids on the Block	1	June 30	7
June 16	"Ready or Not"	After 7	7	June 23	3
June 16	"Do You Remember?"	Phil Collins	4	June 30	4
June 23	"Hold On" (#8)	En Vogue	2	July 21	7
June 23	"I'll Be Your Shelter"	Taylor Dayne	4	July 14	4
June 30	"She Ain't Worth It"	Glenn Medeiros featuring Bobby Brown	1	July 21	7
June 30	"Cradle of Love" (#9)	Billy Idol	2	August 4	8
July 7	"Rub You the Right Way"	Johnny Gill	3	August 4	6
July 14	"Enjoy the Silence"	Depeche Mode	8	July 14	3
July 14	"The Power"	Snap!	2	August 11	6
July 21	"Vision of Love" (#6)	Mariah Carey	1	August 4	7
July 21	"Girls Nite Out"	Tyler Collins	6	August 4	3
July 21	"When I'm Back on My Feet Again"	Michael Bolton	7	August 4	3
July 28	"Hanky Panky"	Madonna	10	July 28	1
August 4	"If Wishes Came True"	Sweet Sensation	1	September 1	7
August 4	"Unskinny Bop"	Poison	3	September 1	8
August 11	"Come Back to Me"	Janet Jackson	2	August 18	5
August 11	"King of Wishful Thinking"	Go West	8	August 11	2
August 11	"Do Me!"	Bell Biv DeVoe	3	September 8	9
August 18	"Blaze of Glory" (#10)	Jon Bon Jovi	1	September 8	8
August 18	"Have You Seen Her"	MC Hammer	4	September 15	6
August 25	"Release Me"	Wilson Phillips	1	September 15	7
August 25	"Jerk Out"	The Time	9	August 25	2
August 25	"Epic"	Faith No More	9	September 8	2
September 1	"Tonight"	New Kids on the Block	7	September 8	3
September 8	"(Can't Live Without Your) Love and Affection"	Nelson	1	September 29	7
September 15	"Thieves in the Temple"	Prince	6	September 22	3
September 15	"Close to You"	Maxi Priest	1	October 6	7
September 22	"Something Happened on the Way to Heaven"	Phil Collins	4	October 6	4
September 22	"Praying for Time"	George Michael	1	October 13	6
September 29	"Oh Girl"	Paul Young	8	October 6	3
September 29	"My, My, My"	Johnny Gill	10	September 29	1
October 6	"I Don't Have the Heart"	James Ingram	1	October 20	7
October 6	"Ice Ice Baby"	Vanilla Ice	1	November 3	7
October 13	"Black Cat"	Janet Jackson	1	October 27	5
October 13	"Romeo"	Dino	6	October 20	2
October 13	"Everybody Everybody"	Black Box	8	October 20	3
October 20	"Giving You the Benefit"	Pebbles	4	October 27	4
October 20	"Can't Stop"	After 7	6	October 27	3
October 27	"Love Takes Time"	Mariah Carey	1	November 10	7
October 27	"Suicide Blonde"	INXS	9	October 27	2
November 3	"Pray"	MC Hammer	2	November 10	4
November 3	"More Than Words Can Say"	Alias	2	November 24	5
November 3	"Cherry Pie"	Warrant	10	November 3	1
November 10	"Groove Is in the Heart"	Deee-Lite	4	November 17	5
November 10	"Knockin' Boots"	Candyman	9	November 10	2
November 10	"Something to Believe In"	Poison	4	December 8	6
November 17	"I'm Your Baby Tonight"	Whitney Houston	1	December 1	8
November 17	"Because I Love You (The Postman Song)"	Stevie B	1	December 8	10
November 17	"From a Distance"	Bette Midler	2	December 15	10
November 24	"Feels Good"	Tony! Toni! Toné!	9	November 24	2
December 1	"The Way You Do the Things You Do"	UB40	6	December 15	5
December 1	"Impulsive"	Wilson Phillips	4	December 22	7
December 8	"Tom's Diner"	DNA featuring Suzanne Vega	5	December 22	6
December 15	"Freedom! '90"	George Michael	8	December 22	3

=== 1989 peaks ===
List of Billboard Hot 100 top ten singles in 1990 which peaked in 1989
Top ten entry date	Single	Artist(s)	Peak	Peak date	Weeks in top ten
November 18	"We Didn't Start the Fire"	Billy Joel	1	December 9	8
November 25	"Don't Know Much"	Linda Ronstadt featuring Aaron Neville	2	December 23	8
November 25	"Another Day in Paradise" (#7)	Phil Collins	1	December 23	10
December 9	"With Every Beat of My Heart"	Taylor Dayne	5	December 16	6
December 16	"Just Like Jesse James"	Cher	8	December 23	5

=== 1991 peaks ===
List of Billboard Hot 100 top ten singles in 1990 which peaked in 1991
Top ten entry date	Single	Artist(s)	Peak	Peak date	Weeks in top ten
December 8	"Justify My Love"	Madonna	1	January 5	8
December 15	"High Enough"	Damn Yankees	3	January 12	8
December 22	"Sensitivity"	Ralph Tresvant	4	January 26	8

== See also ==
- 1990 in music
- List of Billboard Hot 100 number ones of 1990
- Billboard Year-End Hot 100 singles of 1990
