= Billboard Year-End Hot 100 singles of 1990 =

Ranking of recorded music

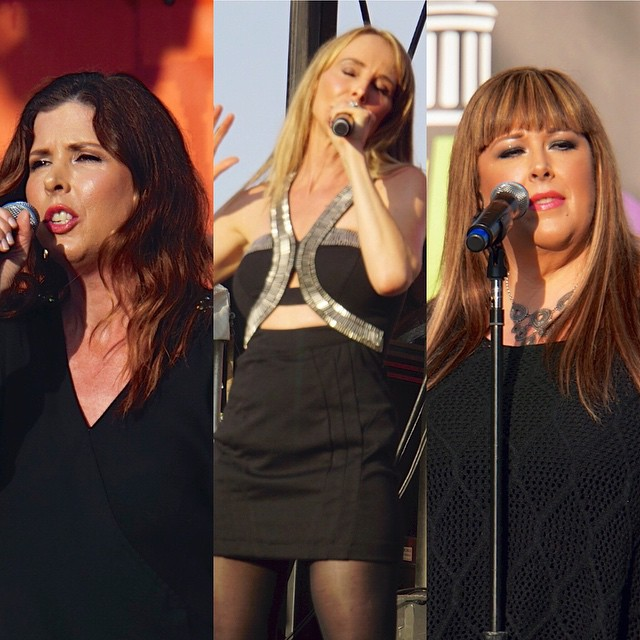
Wilson Phillips (pictured) had two songs on the Year-End Hot 100, "Hold On" at number one and "Release Me" at number 19.

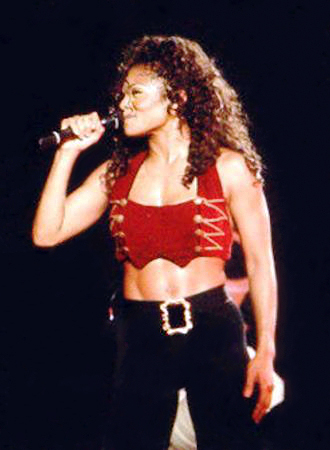
Janet Jackson (pictured) had five songs on the Year-End Hot 100, the most of any artist in 1990.

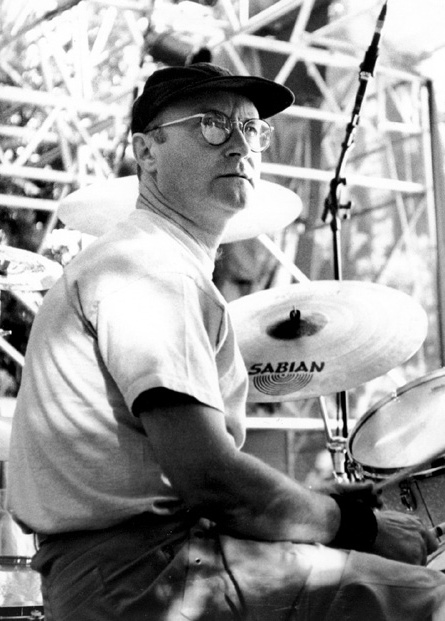
Phil Collins (pictured) had four songs on the Year-End Hot 100.

This is a list of Billboard magazine's Top Hot 100 songs of 1990.

No.	Title	Artist(s)
1	"Hold On"	Wilson Phillips
2	"It Must Have Been Love"	Roxette
3	"Nothing Compares 2 U"	Sinéad O'Connor
4	"Poison"	Bell Biv DeVoe
5	"Vogue"	Madonna
6	"Vision of Love"	Mariah Carey
7	"Another Day in Paradise"	Phil Collins
8	"Hold On"	En Vogue
9	"Cradle of Love"	Billy Idol
10	"Blaze of Glory"	Jon Bon Jovi
11	"Do Me!"	Bell Biv DeVoe
12	"How Am I Supposed to Live Without You"	Michael Bolton
13	"Pump Up the Jam"	Technotronic
14	"Opposites Attract"	Paula Abdul
15	"Escapade"	Janet Jackson
16	"All I Wanna Do Is Make Love to You"	Heart
17	"Close to You"	Maxi Priest
18	"Black Velvet"	Alannah Myles
19	"Release Me"	Wilson Phillips
20	"Don't Know Much"	Linda Ronstadt featuring Aaron Neville
21	"All Around the World"	Lisa Stansfield
22	"I Wanna Be Rich"	Calloway
23	"Rub You the Right Way"	Johnny Gill
24	"She Ain't Worth It"	Glenn Medeiros featuring Bobby Brown
25	"If Wishes Came True"	Sweet Sensation
26	"The Power"	Snap!
27	"(Can't Live Without Your) Love and Affection"	Nelson
28	"Love Will Lead You Back"	Taylor Dayne
29	"Don't Wanna Fall in Love"	Jane Child
30	"Two to Make It Right"	Seduction
31	"Sending All My Love"	Linear
32	"Unskinny Bop"	Poison
33	"Step by Step"	New Kids on the Block
34	"Dangerous"	Roxette
35	"We Didn't Start the Fire"	Billy Joel
36	"I Don't Have the Heart"	James Ingram
37	"Downtown Train"	Rod Stewart
38	"Rhythm Nation"	Janet Jackson
39	"I'll Be Your Everything"	Tommy Page
40	"Roam"	The B-52's
41	"Everything"	Jody Watley
42	"Back to Life (However Do You Want Me)"	Soul II Soul featuring Caron Wheeler
43	"Here and Now"	Luther Vandross
44	"Alright"	Janet Jackson
45	"Ice Ice Baby"	Vanilla Ice
46	"Blame It on the Rain"	Milli Vanilli
47	"Have You Seen Her"	MC Hammer
48	"With Every Beat of My Heart"	Taylor Dayne
49	"Come Back to Me"	Janet Jackson
50	"No More Lies"	Michel'le
51	"Praying for Time"	George Michael
52	"How Can We Be Lovers"	Michael Bolton
53	"Do You Remember?"	Phil Collins
54	"Ready or Not"	After 7
55	"U Can't Touch This"	MC Hammer
56	"I Wish It Would Rain Down"	Phil Collins
57	"Just Between You and Me"	Lou Gramm
58	"Something Happened on the Way to Heaven"	Phil Collins
59	"Black Cat"	Janet Jackson
60	"Can't Stop"	After 7
61	"Janie's Got a Gun"	Aerosmith
62	"The Humpty Dance"	Digital Underground
63	"I'll Be Your Shelter"	Taylor Dayne
64	"Free Fallin'"	Tom Petty
65	"Giving You the Benefit"	Pebbles
66	"Enjoy the Silence"	Depeche Mode
67	"Love Song"	Tesla
68	"Price of Love"	Bad English
69	"Girls Nite Out"	Tyler Collins
70	"King of Wishful Thinking"	Go West
71	"What Kind of Man Would I Be?"	Chicago
72	"I Remember You"	Skid Row
73	"Get Up! (Before the Night Is Over)"	Technotronic featuring Ya Kid K
74	"Here We Are"	Gloria Estefan
75	"Epic"	Faith No More
76	"Love Takes Time"	Mariah Carey
77	"Just Like Jesse James"	Cher
78	"Love Shack"	The B-52's
79	"All or Nothing"	Milli Vanilli
80	"Romeo"	Dino
81	"Everybody Everybody"	Black Box
82	"I Go to Extremes"	Billy Joel
83	"Whip Appeal"	Babyface
84	"Oh Girl"	Paul Young
85	"C'mon and Get My Love"	D Mob with Cathy Dennis
86	"(It's Just) The Way That You Love Me"	Paula Abdul
87	"We Can't Go Wrong"	The Cover Girls
88	"When I'm Back on My Feet Again"	Michael Bolton
89	"Make You Sweat"	Keith Sweat
90	"This One's for the Children"	New Kids on the Block
91	"What It Takes"	Aerosmith
92	"Forever"	Kiss
93	"Jerk Out"	The Time
94	"Just a Friend"	Biz Markie
95	"Whole Wide World"	A'me Lorain
96	"Without You"	Mötley Crüe
97	"Swing the Mood"	Jive Bunny and the Mastermixers
98	"Thieves in the Temple"	Prince
99	"Mentirosa"	Mellow Man Ace
100	"Tic-Tac-Toe"	Kyper

== See also ==
- 1990 in music
- List of Billboard Hot 100 number-one singles of 1990
- List of Billboard Hot 100 top-ten singles in 1990
- Billboard Year-End Hot Rap Singles of 1990
