= Billboard Year-End Hot R&B Singles of 1990 =

American music chart

This is a list of Billboard magazine's Top Hot R&B Singles of 1990.

No.	Title	Artist(s)
1	"Hold On"	En Vogue
2	"Make It Like It Was"	Regina Belle
3	"Real Love"	Skyy
4	"Feels Good"	Tony! Toni! Toné!
5	"Vision of Love"	Mariah Carey
6	"All Around the World"	Lisa Stansfield
7	"I'll Be Good To You"	Quincy Jones featuring Ray Charles and Chaka Khan
8	"My, My, My"	Johnny Gill
9	"Ready or Not"	After 7
10	"Poison"	Bell Biv DeVoe
11	"Spread My Wings"	Troop
12	"Everybody Everybody"	Black Box
13	"Tender Lover"	Babyface
14	"Love Under New Management"	Miki Howard
15	"Lies"	En Vogue
16	"Make You Sweat"	Keith Sweat
17	"Rub You the Right Way"	Johnny Gill
18	"Crazy"	The Boys
19	"Why You Get Funky On Me"	Today
20	"Let's Get It On"	By All Means
21	"Giving You the Benefit"	Pebbles
22	"No More Lies"	Michel'le
23	"Can't Stop"	After 7
24	"Do Me!"	Bell Biv DeVoe
25	"U Can't Touch This"	MC Hammer
26	"The Blues"	Tony! Toni! Toné!
27	"Tomorrow (A Better You, Better Me)"	Quincy Jones featuring Tevin Campbell
28	"Heaven Knows"	Lalah Hathaway
29	"Show Me"	Howard Hewett
30	"Close to You"	Maxi Priest
31	"Jerk Out"	The Time
32	"Rhythm Nation"	Janet Jackson
33	"Where Do We Go from Here"	Stacy Lattisaw and Johnny Gill
34	"The Secret Garden (Sweet Seduction Suite)"	Quincy Jones featuring Al B. Sure!, James Ingram, El DeBarge, and Barry White
35	"All of My Love"	The Gap Band
36	"Here and Now"	Luther Vandross
37	"My Kinda Girl"	Babyface
38	"Walk On By"	Sybil
39	"Ghetto Heaven"	The Family Stand
40	"Opposites Attract"	Paula Abdul
41	"Silky Soul"	Maze
42	"Thieves in the Temple"	Prince
43	"All I do Is Think of You"	Troop
44	"So You Like What You See"	Samuelle
45	"Talk to Me"	Anita Baker
46	"All Over You"	Freddie Jackson
47	"Come Back to Me"	Janet Jackson
48	"The Power"	Snap!
49	"Whip Appeal"	Babyface
50	"Everything You Touch"	Smokey Robinson
51	"The Humpty Dance"	Digital Underground
52	"Have You Seen Her"	MC Hammer
53	"Fairweather Friend"	Johnny Gill
54	"Escapade"	Janet Jackson
55	"It's Gonna Be Alright"	Ruby Turner
56	"Alright"	Janet Jackson
57	"Innocent"	The Whispers
58	"You Can't Deny It"	Lisa Stansfield
59	"Merry Go Round"	Keith Sweat
60	"It's Time"	The Winans
61	"It's the Real Thing"	Angela Winbush
62	"Ain't Nuthin' in the World"	Miki Howard
63	"Expression"	Salt-n-Pepa
64	"Can We Spend Some Time"	Surface
65	"Don't Wanna Fall in Love"	Jane Child
66	"I Wanna Be Rich"	Calloway
67	"Your Sweetness"	The Good Girls
68	"Good Love"	Klymaxx
69	"What Goes Around"	Regina Belle
70	"Until You Come Back to Me (That's What I'm Gonna Do)"	Miki Howard
71	"Never Too Far"	Dianne Reeves
72	"Nicety"	Michel'le
73	"The Boomin' System"	LL Cool J
74	"All Nite"	Entouch featuring Keith Sweat
75	"Love Takes Time"	Mariah Carey
76	"Girls Nite Out"	Tyler Collins
77	"I Want It Now"	Cameo
78	"Stay"	Glenn Jones
79	"Pump Up the Jam"	Technotronic
80	"My Baby's House"	Michael Cooper
81	"I Need Your Lovin'"	Alyson Williams
82	"B.B.D. (I Thought It Was Me)?"	Bell Biv DeVoe
83	"I'll Be Good to You"	Najee
84	"Promises, Promises"	Christopher Williams
85	"Scandalous!"	Prince
86	"Jazzie's Groove"	Soul II Soul
87	"Comfort of a Man"	Stephanie Mills
88	"Foolish Heart"	Sharon Bryant
89	"Get a Life"	Soul II Soul
90	"Treat You Right"	Luther Vandross
91	"Always and Forever"	Whistle
92	"Serious Hold on Me"	The O'Jays
93	"This Is Love"	Regina Belle
94	"Livin' in the Light"	Caron Wheeler
95	"Yo Mister"	Patti LaBelle
96	"Whatcha Gonna Do"	Tyler Collins
97	"Shake It Up!"	Jamaica Boys
98	"Ice Ice Baby"	Vanilla Ice
99	"A Friend"	The Winans
100	"Heritage"	Earth, Wind & Fire

== See also ==
- 1990 in music
- Billboard Year-End Hot 100 singles of 1990
- Billboard Year-End Hot Rap Singles of 1990
- List of Hot R&B Singles number ones of 1990
