= Night Out =

Night Out may refer to:

== Film and TV ==
- Night Out (film), Australian film
- "Night Out" (The Office), a 2008 television episode
- "The Night Out" (Outnumbered), a 2008 television episode

== Music ==
- Night Out (album) by Ellen Foley
- A Night Out, 1961 album by Machito
- "Night Out", song by Paul McCartney from Red Rose Speedway
- "The Night Out", song by Martin Solveig from his album Smash

== See also ==
- A Night Out (disambiguation)
- Boys Night Out (disambiguation)
- Girls' Night Out (disambiguation)
