= Summer Girl (disambiguation) =

Summer Girl or Summer Girls may refer to:

- Summer Girl, album by American band Smash Mouth
- "Summer Girl" (Haim song), 2019
- "Summer Girl" (Stereos song), 2009
- "Summer Girl", song by English band Jamiroquai
- "Summer Girls", song by American band LFO
- "Summer Girls" (Degrassi), a 2015 episode of Degrassi
- "Summer Girls", song from the album Kescke Bak by Ralph McTell
- "Summergirls", from the album 24/7 by Dino, 1987
- "Summer Girl (1983 film)"
