= Take It While It's Hot =

Studio album by Sweet Sensation
- Released: 1988
- Studios: Unique Recording Studios, New York City
- Genre: Latin freestyle
- Length: 40:52
- Labels: Atco/Atlantic Records; 90917
- Producers: David Sanchez; Steve Peck; Ted Currier

Sweet Sensation chronology
| Take It While It's Hot (1988) | Love Child (1990) |

Alternative Cover
- 1989 re-pressing cover

Professional ratings
Review scores
| Source | Rating |
|---|---|
| AllMusic | 2/5 stars |

Take It While It's Hot is the debut album of the New York-based Latin Freestyle trio Sweet Sensation. Released in 1988, it carried on the Freestyle movement of the late 1980s that also involved groups such as Exposé, the Cover Girls, TKA, and Seduction. The album peaked at #63 on the Billboard Top 200 Albums chart, and spawned six hit singles: "Hooked on You," "Victim of Love (Goodbye Baby)," "Take It While It's Hot," "Never Let You Go," "Sincerely Yours," and "Hooked on You" (remixed and re-released as the final single).

Early pressings of the album featured original members Betty LeBron, Margie Fernandez, and Mari Fernandez on the cover. Later pressings of the album featured Sheila Vega on the cover, who replaced Mari Fernandez. The album's vocals, however, were not re-recorded after the personnel change.

French house duo Together sampled "Sincerely Yours" for their 2000 single "Together."

== Track listing ==
1. "Never Let You Go" [Joseph Malloy] (6:08)
2. "Sincerely Yours" [Joseph Malloy, Ricardo Pagan] (4:50)
3. "Love Games" (4:17)
4. "Let Me Be the One" (5:10)
5. "Heartbreak" (4:37)
6. "Take It While It's Hot" [Joseph Malloy] (4:59)
7. "Victim of Love (Goodbye Baby)" (5:45)
8. "Hooked on You" [Joseph Malloy, D. Sanchez] (5:06)
