= List of Billboard Hot 100 number ones of 1990 =

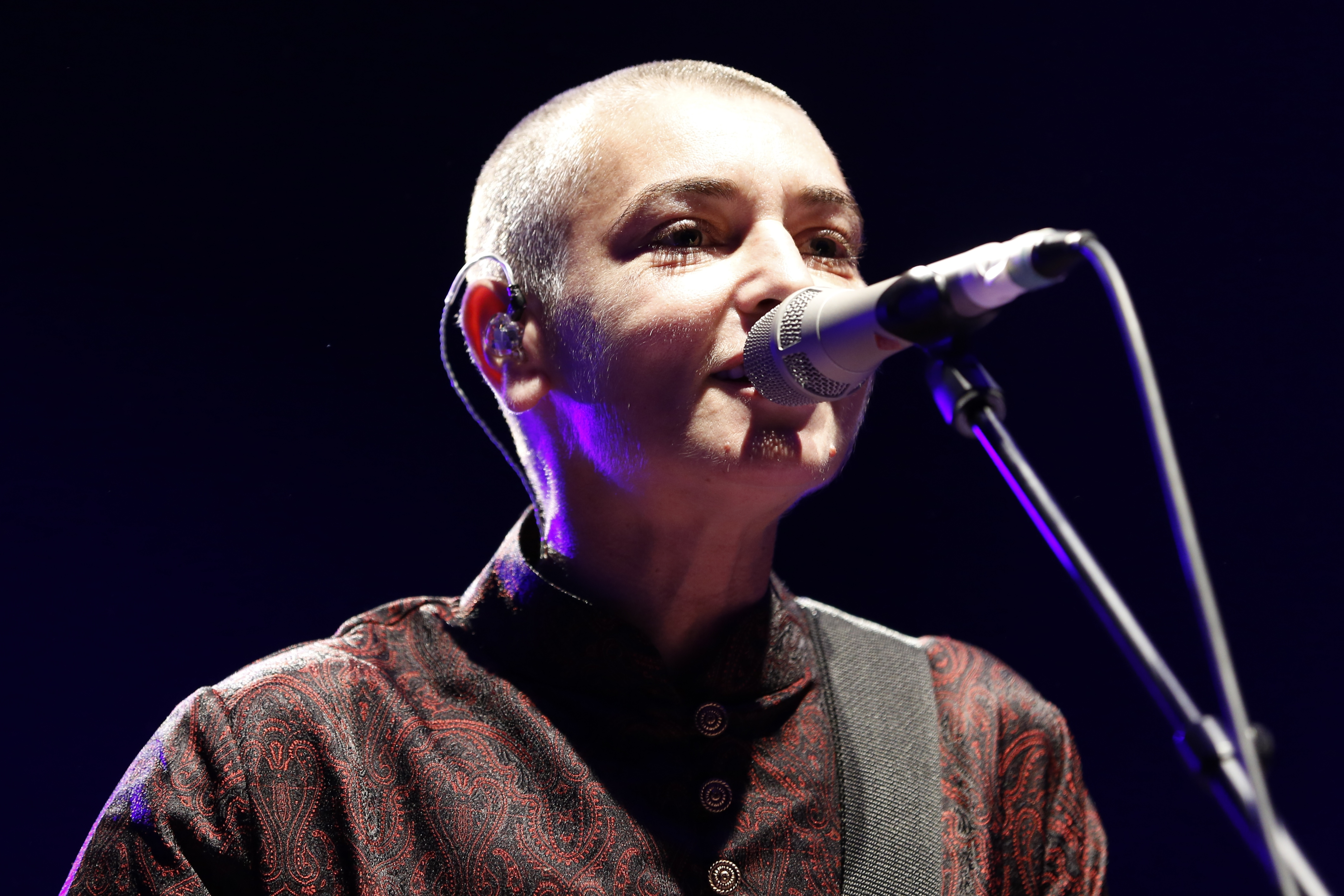
Sinéad O'Connor (pictured) earned her first Hot 100 number-one single with "Nothing Compares 2 U", which stayed at the top position for four weeks.

This is a list of the U.S. Billboard magazine Hot 100 number-ones of 1990. The three longest running number-one singles of 1990 are "Nothing Compares 2 U" by Sinéad O'Connor, "Vision of Love" by Mariah Carey, and "Because I Love You (The Postman Song)" by Stevie B, which each attained four weeks at the top of the chart.

That year, 15 acts earned their first number one song, such as Michael Bolton, The Wild Pair, Alannah Myles, Taylor Dayne, Tommy Page, Sinéad O'Connor, Wilson Phillips, Glenn Medeiros, Mariah Carey, Sweet Sensation, Nelson, Maxi Priest, Vanilla Ice, and Stevie B. Jon Bon Jovi, already having hit number one with Bon Jovi, also earns his first number one song as a solo act. Janet Jackson, Wilson Phillips, and Mariah Carey were the only acts to hit number one more than once, with each of them hitting twice.

== Chart history ==
Key
The yellow background indicates the #1 song on Billboard's 1990 Year-End Chart of Pop Singles.

No.	Issue date	Song	Artist(s)	Ref.
710	January 6	"Another Day in Paradise"	Phil Collins	
710	January 13	"Another Day in Paradise"	Phil Collins	
711	January 20	"How Am I Supposed to Live Without You"	Michael Bolton	
711	January 27	"How Am I Supposed to Live Without You"	Michael Bolton	
711	February 3	"How Am I Supposed to Live Without You"	Michael Bolton	
712	February 10	"Opposites Attract"	Paula Abdul with The Wild Pair	
712	February 17	"Opposites Attract"	Paula Abdul with The Wild Pair	
712	February 24	"Opposites Attract"	Paula Abdul with The Wild Pair	
713	March 3	"Escapade"	Janet Jackson	
713	March 10	"Escapade"	Janet Jackson	
713	March 17	"Escapade"	Janet Jackson	
714	March 24	"Black Velvet"	Alannah Myles	
714	March 31	"Black Velvet"	Alannah Myles	
715	April 7	"Love Will Lead You Back"	Taylor Dayne	
716	April 14	"I'll Be Your Everything"	Tommy Page	
717	April 21	"Nothing Compares 2 U"	Sinéad O'Connor	
717	April 28	"Nothing Compares 2 U"	Sinéad O'Connor	
717	May 5	"Nothing Compares 2 U"	Sinéad O'Connor	
717	May 12	"Nothing Compares 2 U"	Sinéad O'Connor	
718	May 19	"Vogue"	Madonna	
718	May 26	"Vogue"	Madonna	
718	June 2	"Vogue"	Madonna	
719	June 9	"Hold On"	Wilson Phillips	
720	June 16	"It Must Have Been Love"	Roxette	
720	June 23	"It Must Have Been Love"	Roxette	
721	June 30	"Step by Step"	New Kids on the Block	
721	July 7	"Step by Step"	New Kids on the Block	
721	July 14	"Step by Step"	New Kids on the Block	
722	July 21	"She Ain't Worth It"	Glenn Medeiros featuring Bobby Brown	
722	July 28	"She Ain't Worth It"	Glenn Medeiros featuring Bobby Brown	
723	August 4	"Vision of Love"	Mariah Carey	
723	August 11	"Vision of Love"	Mariah Carey	
723	August 18	"Vision of Love"	Mariah Carey	
723	August 25	"Vision of Love"	Mariah Carey	
724	September 1	"If Wishes Came True"	Sweet Sensation	
725	September 8	"Blaze of Glory"	Jon Bon Jovi	
726	September 15	"Release Me"	Wilson Phillips	
726	September 22	"Release Me"	Wilson Phillips	
727	September 29	"(Can't Live Without Your) Love and Affection"	Nelson	
728	October 6	"Close to You"	Maxi Priest	
729	October 13	"Praying for Time"	George Michael	
730	October 20	"I Don't Have the Heart"	James Ingram	
731	October 27	"Black Cat"	Janet Jackson	
732	November 3	"Ice Ice Baby"	Vanilla Ice	
733	November 10	"Love Takes Time"	Mariah Carey	
733	November 17	"Love Takes Time"	Mariah Carey	
733	November 24	"Love Takes Time"	Mariah Carey	
734	December 1	"I'm Your Baby Tonight"	Whitney Houston	
735	December 8	"Because I Love You (The Postman Song)"	Stevie B	
735	December 15	"Because I Love You (The Postman Song)"	Stevie B	
735	December 22	"Because I Love You (The Postman Song)"	Stevie B	
735	December 29 (Note: This was an unpublished week, due to a special double issue that Billboard published in print the previous week, for the year-end charts, and covered two weeks; all Billboard weekly charts were "frozen" during the break.)	"Because I Love You (The Postman Song)"	Stevie B	

== Number-one artists ==
List of number-one artists by total weeks at number one
Position	Artist	Weeks at No. 1
1	Mariah Carey	7
2	Janet Jackson	4
2	Sinéad O'Connor	4
2	Stevie B	4
5	Michael Bolton	3
5	Paula Abdul	3
5	The Wild Pair	3
5	Madonna	3
5	Wilson Phillips	3
5	New Kids on the Block	3
11	Phil Collins	2
11	Alannah Myles	2
11	Roxette	2
11	Glenn Medeiros	2
11	Bobby Brown	2
16	Taylor Dayne	1
16	Tommy Page	1
16	Sweet Sensation	1
16	Jon Bon Jovi	1
16	Nelson	1
16	Maxi Priest	1
16	George Michael	1
16	James Ingram	1
16	Vanilla Ice	1
16	Whitney Houston	1

== See also ==
- 1990 in music
- List of Billboard number-one singles
- List of Billboard Hot 100 number-one singles of the 1990s

== Additional sources ==
- Fred Bronson's Billboard Book of Number 1 Hits, 5th Edition (ISBN 0-8230-7677-6)
- Joel Whitburn's Top Pop Singles 1955-2008, 12 Edition (ISBN 0-89820-180-2)
- Joel Whitburn Presents the Billboard Hot 100 Charts: The Nineties (ISBN 0-89820-137-3)
- Additional information obtained can be verified within Billboard's online archive services and print editions of the magazine.
