= Never Too Much =

Never Too Much may refer to:

- Never Too Much (album), a 1981 album by Luther Vandross
  - "Never Too Much" (song), the title song from the album
- "Never Too Much" (Missing You), a 2025 television episode

== See also ==
- "Never 2 Much of U", a 1989 song by Dino from the album 24/7
