= GNO =

GNO may refer to:

- Gamma Normids
- Girls' Night Out (disambiguation)
- "G.N.O. (Girls Night Out)", a song by Miley Cyrus from the album Hannah Montana 2: Meet Miley Cyrus
- "G.N.O", a song by Wonder Girls from the album Wonder World
- GNO/ME, a Unix-like operating system for the Apple IIGS
- Gnomic aspect
- Greater New Orleans
- Greek National Opera
- Northern Gondi language
