= Michel'le (album) =

Studio album by Michel'le
- Released: October 23, 1989
- Recorded: 1989
- Genre: New jack swing
- Length: 45:28
- Labels: Ruthless; Atco; Atlantic
- Producers: Dr. Dre; Andre "L.A. Dre" Bolton

Michel'le chronology
Michel'le (1989)	Hung Jury (1998)

Singles from Michel'le
- 1. "No More Lies" Released: October 13, 1989; 2. "Nicety" Released: 1990; 3. "Keep Watchin'" Released: 1990; 4. "Something in My Heart" Released: October 18, 1990; 5. "If?" Released: 1991

Michel'le is the debut studio album by American singer Michel'le. It was released on October 23, 1989, on Ruthless Records, Atco Records and Atlantic Records. The album was co produced by Dr. Dre of N.W.A and André “LA Dre” Bolton. The album was certified Gold by the Recording Industry Association of America five weeks after its release.

== Commercial performance ==
Following its release, the record reached number 35 on the Billboard 200 and number five on the Top R&B Albums chart. Five singles were released, "No More Lies", "Nicety", "If?", "Something in My Heart" and "Keep Watchin'". The most successful of these was "No More Lies", which peaked at number seven on the Billboard Hot 100 and number two on the Billboard Hot R&B Singles chart.

New York rapper Tim Dog sampled the song "No More Lies" in his track "Fuck Compton", a diss song towards West Coast hip hop, from his 1991 album Penicillin on Wax. In 2004, P-Dub sampled "Something in My Heart" in his song "4 Walls the After Effect". Song "If?" was sampled in Kehlani's 2014 song "As I Am".

== Critical reception ==
Professional ratings
Review scores
Source	Rating
AllMusic	4/5 stars
Chicago Tribune	2.5/4 stars
The Encyclopedia of Popular Music	3/5 stars
The Rolling Stone Album Guide	3/5 stars
Spin Alternative Record Guide	8/10
The Village Voice	B+

The Record noted that "the young singer makes her mark [on] the slow-paced songs, which allow Michel'le to stretch, emote, and show the full range of her voice, at times reminiscent of Anita Baker's."

== Track listing ==
No.	Title	Writer(s)	Length
1.	"No More Lies"	M. Toussaint; L. Goodman; A. Young	3:49
2.	"Nicety"	M. Toussaint; A. Young	3:26
3.	"If?" (Duet with Michael Holmes)	L. Goodman; A. Bolton	5:23
4.	"Keep Watchin'"	M. Toussaint; A. Young; L. Goodman; T. Curry	4:24
5.	"Something in My Heart"	M. Toussaint; A. Young	5:40
6.	"100% Woman"	A. Young	3:50
7.	"Silly Love Song"	E. Johnson; M. Stokes	5:29
8.	"Never Been in Love"	M. Toussaint; A. Young	3:41
9.	"Close to Me"	M. Toussaint; L. Goodman; A. Young	5:39
10.	"Special Thanks"	M. Toussaint; A. Young; L. Goodman	2:33
11.	"If?" (Reprise)	M. Toussaint; A. Young	1:34

Notes

- "Silly Love Song" is a cover of "Silly Love Song" by Enchantment (1977)

Samples

- "No More Lies" sampled "Funky Drummer" by James Brown (1970)
- "Nicety" sampled "Funky President (People It's Bad)" by James Brown (1974) and "Action" by Orange Krush (1982)
- "Keep Watchin'" sampled "Think (About It)" by Lyn Collins (1972)
- "100% Woman" sampled "Blow Your Head" by Fred Wesley & the J.B.'s (1974)

== Personnel ==
- Michel'le Toussaint - lead vocals, backing vocals (tracks 1, 8)
- LaShana Dendy (X's3 / Times 3) - backing vocals (tracks 4, 5)
- Michael Holmes - backing vocals (tracks 3, 11)
- Denise West - backing vocals (track 7)
- Karen Foster - backing vocals (track 7)
- Vivien Jackson - backing vocals (track 7)
- Andre "L.A. Dre" Bolton - keyboards, co-producer
- Andre Young - keyboards (track 1), producer, mixing
- Donald Tavie - keyboards (track 7)
- Bruce "Mal" Malament - piano (tracks 3, 7, 11)
- Stan Jones - bass & guitar (track 7)
- Dennis Belfield - bass (tracks 3, 11)
- Mike Sims - guitar, recording
- Ron Krasinski - drums (tracks 3, 11)
- Brian Kilgore - percussion
- Michael Acosta - saxophone
- William Zimmerman - saxophone
- Brian Gardner - mastering
- Antoine Carraby - mixing
- Donovan "The Dirtbiker" Sound - recording
- Eric Wright - executive producer
- Elizabeth Barrett - design
- David Roth - photography

== Charts ==
=== Weekly charts ===
Chart (1989–90)	Peak position
Australian Albums (ARIA)	143
US Billboard 200	35
US Top R&B/Hip-Hop Albums (Billboard)	5

=== Year-end charts ===
Chart (1990)	Position
US Billboard 200	87
US Top R&B/Hip-Hop Albums (Billboard)	16

Chart (1991)	Position
US Top R&B/Hip-Hop Albums (Billboard)	97

== Certifications ==
Region	Certification	Certified units/sales
United States (RIAA)	Gold	500,000^{^}
^{^} Shipments figures based on certification alone.
