= Love Child (Sweet Sensation album) =

Studio album by Sweet Sensation
- Released: April 15, 1990
- Recorded: 1989–1990
- Length: 41:16
- Labels: Atco/Atlantic Records; 91307
- Producers: Steve Peck; Ted Currier

Sweet Sensation chronology
Take It While It's Hot (1988)	Love Child (1990)	Time to Jam (The Remix Album) (1991)

Professional ratings
Review scores
Source	Rating
AllMusic	1.5/5 stars

Love Child is the second album released by the New York-based Latin Freestyle trio Sweet Sensation. It was released on April 15, 1990 by Atco Records and Atlantic Records, and is the follow-up to the group's platinum-selling 1988 debut album Take It While It's Hot. Like its predecessor, Love Child featured an up-tempo feel, but also included lush R&B-styled ballads.

"Love Child," the album's title track, is a cover of the hit 1968 song by The Supremes. Sweet Sensation's version peaked at #15 on the Billboard dance chart and #13 on the Billboard Hot 100 chart. However, it was the album's second single that gave the group its biggest hit, "If Wishes Came True," a power ballad featuring lead vocals by Betty Lebron. It spent one week at #1 on Billboard's Hot 100 in September 1990, while reaching the top ten on the Billboard Adult Contemporary Chart. The album spawned two more hit singles: "Each and Every Time" (#59) and "One Good Man." The album peaked at #78 on the Billboard Top 200 Albums Chart, and was certified platinum in 1991 by the RIAA.

== Track listing ==
No.	Title	Writer(s)	Length
1.	"One Good Man"	Andy Marvel, Fred Shehadi	5:14
2.	"Each and Every Time"	Ken Cedar, Arnie Roman	4:05
3.	"Bring It Back"	Marvin Ennis, Bill Pettaway	4:22
4.	"If Wishes Came True"	Deena Charles, Russ DeSalvo, Robert Steele	5:12
5.	"I Surrender"	Romeo J.D.	4:15
6.	"Destiny"	Jim Klein	4:41
7.	"Love Child"	Deke Richards, Pam Sawyer, R. Dean Taylor, Frank Wilson	4:10
8.	"Pleasure and Pain"	Romeo J.D.	4:52
9.	"He'll Never Know"	Cedar, Shelly Peiken	4:25

== Personnel ==
Sweet Sensation

- Betty LeBron – vocals
- Margie Fernandez – vocals
- Sheila Vega – vocals

With:

- Audrey Wheeler – backing vocals, vocal arrangements (3, 5, 7)

Musicians

- Mac Quayle – keyboard programming (1), arrangements (1)
- Andy Marvel – additional keyboards (1), arrangements (1)
- Phil Ashley – keyboards (2, 6), drum programming (2, 4, 9), keyboard programming (4, 9), arrangements (4, 9), programming (6)
- Ken Cedar – keyboards (2), drum programming (2), arrangements (2)
- Gary Henry – keyboards (2), drum programming (2), sweetening (3, 5), programming (7)
- Bobby Khozouri – keyboards (3), programming (3), keyboard programming (5), drum programming (5)
- Robbie Kilgore – sweetening (3, 5)
- Jim Klein – additional keyboards (6), acoustic guitar (6)
- Richard Joseph – programming (7)
- Romeo J.D. – keyboard programming (8), drum programming (8)
- Peter Schwartz – keyboard programming (8), drum programming (8)
- Werner F. – guitars (1), acoustic guitar (4)
- John Hart – guitars (1), acoustic guitar (8)
- Russ De Salvo – all guitars (2, 9), electric guitars (4), guitar solo (7)
- Bashiri Johnson – percussion (1, 6, 8)
- Steve Thornton – percussion (1)
- Charlie Dee Diaz – loops (3, 5)
- Emedin Rivera – percussion (7)
- Graham Hawthorne – percussion (9)
- Barry Rogers – trombone (1)
- King Shameek – scratches (3, 5)
- Steve Peck – arrangements (1, 2, 4, 6, 8, 9)
- Arnie Roman – arrangements (2)
- Tony Terry – vocal arrangements (3, 5)
- Andre Smith – vocal arrangements (7)

=== Production ===
- Produced by Ted Currier and Steve Peck
- Additional production by Charlie Dee Diaz
- Executive producer: Cherrie Shepard
- Engineers: Paul Berry, Richard Joseph, Steve Peck
- Mixing: Ted Currier, Rod Hui, Jim Lyons, Steve Peck, Charlie Dee Diaz
- Mastering: Ted Jensen

== Charts ==
Chart performance for Love Child
Chart (1990)	Peak position
Australian Albums (ARIA)	142
US Billboard 200	78
