= Caught in the Middle (album) =

Studio album by Linear
- Released: April 28, 1992
- Genre: Pop, freestyle
- Length: 48:10
- Label: Atlantic
- Producer: David Frank, Todd Adler, Doug Gordon, Gary Tutalo, Linear

Linear chronology
| Linear (1990) | Caught in the Middle (1992) |

Singles from Caught in the Middle
- 1. "T.L.C." Released: 1992; 2. "Smile If You Like Sex" Released: 1992

Professional ratings
Review scores
| Source | Rating |
|---|---|
| AllMusic | 3/5 stars |

Caught in the Middle is the second studio album by the freestyle-pop group Linear, released in 1992 by Atlantic Records. While the album's first single, "TLC", peaked at No. 30 on the Billboard Hot 100, Caught in the Middle did not chart.

== Track listing ==
| No. | Title | Length |
|---|---|---|
| 1. | "T.L.C." | 3:59 |
| 2. | "Love Always" | 4:08 |
| 3. | "Smile If You Like Sex" | 4:00 |
| 4. | "Since You Been Gone" | 4:09 |
| 5. | "If You Go Away" | 5:02 |
| 6. | "Can't Break a Broken Heart" | 3:52 |
| 7. | "Ooh La La La" | 3:30 |
| 8. | "Surrender Your Heart" | 3:57 |
| 9. | "19 and a Knockout" | 3:34 |
| 10. | "There's Nothing I Won't Do" | 3:37 |
| 11. | "I Just Can't Stop Loving You" | 4:47 |
| 12. | "Since You Been Gone" (Acoustic Version) | 4:07 |

== Charts ==
Singles - Billboard (North America)

| Year | Single | Chart | Position |
|---|---|---|---|
| 1992 | "T.L.C." | The Billboard Hot 100 | 30 |
