= A Place for Everything =

- Written by: Tom Connachie; William W. H. Gunn; William Whitehead
- Composer: Ricky Hyslop
- Country of origin: Canada
- Original language: English
- No. of seasons: 2

Production
- Producers: Dennis Spence; Tom Connachie
- Running time: 30 minutes

Original release
- Network: CBC Television
- Release: 3 July 1964 – 20 March 1966

A Place for Everything is a Canadian television nature documentary series that aired on CBC Television from 1964 to 1966.

== Premise ==
This series concerned ecology, covering topics such as endangered or lesser-known animal species. The series included a two-part feature on Arctic marine life while another explored some unpopulated Canadian islands.

== Production ==
Toronto-based Dennis Spence produced the series, with Vancouver's Tom Connachie providing additional production work on three episodes. The musical score was provided by Ricky Hyslop. William W. H. Gunn, a biologist, provided scriptwriting and advice to the series and recorded nature sounds for the production. Soloists on the music track included John Dembeck, Nicolas Fiore, Alf Harris, Moe Koffman, Eugene Rittich and Eric Traugott.

== Scheduling ==
The half-hour series aired on Fridays at 8 p.m. (Eastern) from 3 July to 18 September 1964. In 1966, it was rebroadcast Sundays at 5 p.m. from 30 January to 20 March.
