= Swingin' (Dino album) =

Swingin

Studio album by Dino
- Released: August 13, 1990
- Genre: Pop
- Label: Island
- Producer: Dino

Dino chronology
| 24/7 (1989) | Swingin (1990) | The Way I Am (1993) |

Professional ratings
Review scores
| Source | Rating |
|---|---|
| Chicago Tribune | 2.5/4 stars |
| The Rolling Stone Album Guide | 2/5 stars |

Swingin' is the second studio album by the American singer Dino. It was released in 1990 by Island Records. The album reached No. 82 on the Billboard 200.

The album contains two singles, "Romeo", which reached No. 6 on the Billboard Hot 100 singles chart, and "Gentle", which reached No. 31. The former features rapper Doctor Ice.

== Production ==
Dino produced the album, and wrote nine of the songs.

== Critical reception ==
The Chicago Tribune wrote that "in years to come, Dino may prove to be more durable as a behind-the-scenes force ... but there are enough sizzling songs here to keep his name in front of dance-pop listeners for months."

== Track listing ==
| No. | Title | Length |
|---|---|---|
| 1. | "Romeo" (featuring Doctor Ice) | 4:42 |
| 2. | "Can't Get Away from You" | 4:32 |
| 3. | "Falling for You" | 4:27 |
| 4. | "Gentle" | 5:22 |
| 5. | "Swingin'" | 4:46 |
| 6. | "Tongue Kiss" | 4:51 |
| 7. | "Why Do You Do Me?" | 5:03 |
| 8. | "After the Sun Goes Down" | 5:06 |
| 9. | "In the Morning" | 4:48 |
| 10. | "Wish on a Star" | 4:26 |

== Charts ==
| Chart (1990) | Peak position |
|---|---|
| US Billboard 200 | 82 |
