= Hung Jury (album) =

Studio album by Michel'le
- Released: August 24, 1998
- Recorded: 1998
- Genres: R&B; hip hop soul
- Labels: Death Row; Priority
- Producers: Suge Knight (exec.); Michel'le; Carl "Butch" Small

Michel'le chronology
Michel'le (1989)	Hung Jury (1998)

Singles from Hung Jury
- 1. "Hang Tyme" Released: 1998; 2. "Can I Get a Witness?" Released: 1998

Professional ratings
Review scores
Source	Rating
AllMusic	2.5/5 stars

Hung Jury is the second studio album by American singer Michel'le. It was her first album in nearly nine years at the time of its release and her most recent studio album to date. The album was released on August 24, 1998, by Death Row Records and Priority Records and was produced by Michel'le and Suge Knight. Two singles that were released were "Hang Tyme" and "Can I Get a Witness?".

== Commercial performance ==
Unlike her highly successful debut album, this album had limited promotion due to the declining label's many highly-publicized controversies which resulted in poor sales; it peaked at #56 on the Top R&B/Hip-Hop Albums chart and failed to produce any hit singles. The album sold 91,000 units to date in the United States.

== Track listing ==
No.	Title	Writer(s)	Producer(s)	Length
1.	"Hang Tyme"	Reggie Lamb; Michel'le	Reggie "Regg" Moore	4:54
2.	"Can I Get a Witness"	Steve Grisette; Michel'le; David L. Stewar	David L. Stewart	4:09
3.	"Crazy"	Reggie Lamb; Michel'le	Reggie "Regg" Moore	4:21
4.	"Here 4 U"	Reggie Lamb	Reggie "Regg" Moore	4:23
5.	"After the Love"	Reggie Lamb; Michel'le	Reggie "Regg" Moore	4:39
6.	"Tonight Is"	Lou Donaldson; Michel'le	Kyle Jackson; Marvin Paige	4:42
7.	"Walk With Me"	Cynthia Calhoun; Michel'le; Craig Lane	Carl "Butch" Small; Craig Lane	5:39
8.	"Don't Say U Love Me"	Reggie Lamb; Michel'le	Reggie "Regg" Moore	4:47
9.	"Wasted My Tyme"	Michel'le	Kyle Jackson; Marvin Paige	3:46
10.	"No Where 2 Run"	Cynthia Calhoun; Michel'le	Reggie "Regg" Moore	4:31
11.	"Hung Jury"	Reggie Lamb; Michel'le; Frank Wilson	Reggie "Regg" Moore	4:39

== Credits and personnel ==
- Patrice Adams, Terrance Downs, Tara Fletcher, Vicky Lowery
- Michel'le – Lead Vocals, Backing Vocals, Producer, Vocal Arrangement
- Steve Capp – engineer
- Craig Lane – keyboards, composer, arranger, producer
- David Thomasson, Trevor Lawrence – saxophone
- Craig "Butt" Eator – Vocal Arrangement, Producer
- Ricky Rouse – guitar
- Keston Wright – engineer, mixer
- Reggie Lamb – composer, Vocal Arrangement, Backing Vocals
- Carl "Butch" Small – percussion, arranger, mixer, producer
- Frank Wilson – composer
- Warren Woods – mixer, engineer
- Steve Grisette – composer
- Cameron Webb – engineer
- Sage – Background Vocals
- Marvin Paige – Vocal Arrangement, Producer
- Lou Donaldson – composer
- Kyle "Majik" Jackson – producer, Drum Programmer
- David L. Stewart – producer
- Kenny Ochoa – engineer
- Regg – mixer, Vocal Arrangement, Producer
- Suge Knight – Executive-Producer, Producer

== Charts ==
Chart (1998)	Peak position
US Top R&B/Hip-Hop Albums (Billboard)	56
