= Linear (album) =

Studio album by Linear
- Released: March 21, 1990
- Studio: Futura International Studios, Spectrum Studios, International Sound Studios
- Genre: Pop, freestyle
- Length: 43:37
- Label: Atlantic
- Producer: Tolga Katas, Phil Jones

Linear chronology
Linear (1990)	Caught in the Middle (1992)

Singles from Linear
- 1. "Sending All My Love" Released: February 15, 1990; 2. "Don't You Come Cryin'" Released: 1990; 3. "Something Going On" Released: 1990

Professional ratings
Review scores
Source	Rating
AllMusic	4.5/5 stars

Linear is the name of the debut studio album by the pop/freestyle group Linear. It was released on March 21, 1990, by Atlantic Records. The album's first single, "Sending All My Love", reached No. 5 on the Billboard Hot 100, making the album itself reach No. 52 on the Billboard 200. It also won a gold certificate the same year, selling more than five hundred thousand copies in the United States. The second single, "Don't You Come Cryin'", did not repeat the success of the previous single - though it achieved some prominence, reaching No. 70 on the Billboard Hot 100. The album's last single, "Something Going On", failed to chart.

== Track listing ==
- All songs written by Charlie Pennachio, except track 2 (Pennachio, Charles Christopher) and 4 & 9 (Pennachio, Tolga Katas, Wyatt Pauley).

No.	Title	Length
1.	"Sending All My Love"	3:54
2.	"Something Going On"	3:41
3.	"Heartache"	4:34
4.	"You're My Lady"	4:13
5.	"Dream About Me"	3:46
6.	"Lies"	3:34
7.	"Don't You Come Cryin'"	3:49
8.	"I Never Felt This Way"	3:20
9.	"Still in Love"	4:48
10.	"Sending All My Love" (Club Mix)	8:17

== Personnel ==
Linear

- Charlie Pennachio – vocals
- Wyatt "Riot" Pauley – guitars, bass, vocals
- Joey "Bang" Restivo – percussion, vocals, rap (4, 6)

Additional musicians

- Tolga Katas – keyboards, backing vocals
- Phillip Conneilly – guitars, backing vocals
- Todd Kelly – drums
- Charles Christopher – backing vocals
- Maria Mendez – backing vocals
- Gene Minix – backing vocals
- Cheri Puccini – backing vocals
- Dawn Rix – backing vocals

== Production ==
- Tolga Katas – producer
- Phil Jones – additional production (1, 10)
- Todd Adler – executive producer (1, 10)
- Steven Robillard – engineer
- Jamie Swartz – engineer
- Cesar Sogbe – engineer
- Debbie DeNesse – assistant engineer
- Damon Stewart – assistant engineer
- Dennis King – mastering at Atlantic Studios (New York City, New York)
- Bob Defrin – art direction
- Anthony Ranieri – design
- David Vance – photography

== Charts ==
Chart (1990)	Peak position
Canada RPM Magazine	37
US Billboard 200	52

Singles - Billboard (North America)

Year	Single	Chart	Position
1990	"Sending All My Love"	Hot Dance Music/Maxi-Singles Sales	8
1990	"Sending All My Love"	Billboard Hot 100	5
1990	"Don't You Come Cryin'"	Billboard Hot 100	70
