= Sunshine (Dino song) =

Single by Dino

from the album 24/7
- Released: 1989
- Genre: Dance-pop, new jack swing
- Length: 3:49 (album version)
- Label: 4th & B'way/Island
- Songwriter: Dino
- Producer: Dino

Dino singles chronology
| "I Like It" (1989) | "Sunshine" (1989) | "In the City" (1989) |

"Sunshine" is the fourth single released by singer Dino from his 1989 album 24/7.

== Track listing ==
US 12" Single

| No. | Title | Length |
|---|---|---|
| 1. | "Sunshine" (Vocal) | 5:20 |
| 2. | "Sunshine" (Edit) | 4:04 |
| 3. | "Sunshine" (Instrumental) | 5:20 |

== Charts ==
| Chart (1989–1990) | Peak Position |
|---|---|
| U.S. Billboard Hot 100 | 23 |
| U.S. Billboard Hot R&B/Hip-Hop Singles & Tracks | 47 |
