= Girls' Night Out =

Girls' Night Out, Girls Night Out, Girls' Nite Out, or Girls Nite Out may refer to:

== Film and television ==
=== Film ===
- Girls Nite Out (1982 film), an American slasher film
- Girls' Night Out (1998 film), a South Korean erotic drama
- Girl's Night Out (2015 film), a Spanish comedy
- Girls' Night Out (2017 film) or Rough Night, an American dark comedy

=== Television episodes ===
- "Girls' Night Out" (Ally McBeal), 2000
- "Girls' Night Out" (Danny Phantom), 2007
- "Girls Night Out" (The Flash), 2017
- "Girls' Night Out" (The New Batman Adventures), 1998
- "Girls' Night Out" (SpongeBob SquarePants), 2018
- "The Girls' Night Out", a 1961 episode of The Flintstones

== Music ==
=== Albums ===
- Girls Night Out (Babyface album) or the title song, 2022
- Girls' Night Out (Toronto album) or the title song, 1983
- Girls Nite Out (Tyler Collins album) or the title song (see below), 1989
- Girls Night Out, by Candy Dulfer, 1999

=== Songs ===
- "Girls Night Out" (Charli XCX song), 2018
- "Girls Night Out" (Debbie Gibson song), 2019
- "Girls Night Out" (The Judds song), 1985
- "Girls Nite Out" (Tyler Collins song), 1990
- "Girls Night Out", by Alda, 1998
- "Girls Night Out", by Bratz from the Rock Angelz film soundtrack, 2005
- "Girls Night Out", by FEMM from Femm-Isation, 2014
- "G.N.O. (Girls' Night Out)", by Miley Cyrus from Hannah Montana 2: Meet Miley Cyrus, 2007

=== Other music ===
- A Girl's Night Out, a 2008 series of charity concerts by Rihanna

== Other uses ==
- Girls' Night Out, a 1990 comedy show by Jenny Jones
- Girls Night Out, a 2006 short-story anthology edited by Alisa Valdes-Rodriguez
- Bachelorette party
