= Jane Child (album) =

Studio album by Jane Child
- Released: September 12, 1989
- Recorded: 1988–1989
- Genre: Dance-pop
- Length: 46:37
- Label: Warner Bros.
- Producer: Jane Child

Jane Child chronology
| Jane Child (1989) | Here Not There (1993) |

Singles from Jane Child
- 1. "Don't Wanna Fall in Love" Released: January 19, 1990 (US); 2. "Welcome to the Real World" Released: May 1990 (US)

Professional ratings
Review scores
| Source | Rating |
|---|---|
| AllMusic | 4.5/5 stars |

Jane Child is the debut album by Canadian singer-songwriter Jane Child, released in 1989 on the Warner Bros. record label. It includes the single "Don't Wanna Fall in Love", which reached number 2 on the US Billboard Hot 100 and number 22 in the UK Singles Chart.

The album reached No. 49 on the US Billboard 200 chart for the chart week of April 28, 1990, and stayed on the chart for 22 weeks.

== Track listing ==
All tracks are written by Jane Child

| No. | Title | Length |
|---|---|---|
| 1. | "Welcome to the Real World" | 5:00 |
| 2. | "I Got News for You" | 4:37 |
| 3. | "Don't Let It Get to You" | 4:11 |
| 4. | "Don't Wanna Fall in Love" | 4:08 |
| 5. | "You're My Religion Now" | 5:41 |
| 6. | "Hey Mr. Jones" | 6:54 |
| 7. | "Biology" | 6:14 |
| 8. | "DS 21" | 4:30 |
| 9. | "World Lullabye" | 3:10 |
| 10. | "Thank You" | 2:11 |
| Total length: | | 46:37 |

== Personnel ==
Musicians

- Jane Child – lead, backing and harmony vocals; keyboards; synthesizers; synth bass; electric bass; drums; percussion; drum programming
- James Harrah – guitars

Production

- Jane Child – production
- Dave Jerden – recording and engineering on all tracks except "DS 21", "Hey Mr. Jones" and "World Lullabye" and "You're My Religion Now"
- Hein Hoven – recording and engineering on "DS 21", "Hey Mr. Jones" and "World Lullabye"
- Mark Wolfson – recording and engineering on "You're My Religion Now"
- Jon Baker – assistant engineering
- Annette Cisneros – additional engineering
- Chris Lord-Alge – mixing
- Greg Fulginiti – mastering
