= A Night Out =

A Night Out may refer to:

- A Night Out (1915 film), starring Charlie Chaplin and Edna Purviance
- A Night Out, a 1916 film starring May Robson
- A Night Out (1961 film), an Australian television play
- A Night Out (play), by Harold Pinter
- A Night Out (musical) (1920), book by Arthur Miller and George Grossmith, Jr., music by Willie Redstone and lyrics by Clifford Grey
- "A Night Out" (Rising Damp), a 1974 television episode

== See also ==
- Night Out (disambiguation)
