= The Way I Am (Dino album) =

Studio album by Dino
- Released: August 3, 1993
- Genre: Pop
- Label: EastWest

Dino chronology
Swingin' (1990)	The Way I Am (1993)

The Way I Am is the third studio album by dance-pop musician Dino, released on August 3, 1993, on EastWest Records. Two singles were released from the album. The first was "Ooh Child" (a cover of a song originally released in 1970 by the group The Five Stairsteps), which reached No. 27 on the Billboard Hot 100 in 1993. The second single, "Endlessly," did not chart.

== Track listing ==
All tracks are written by Dino, except where indicated.

No.	Title	Writer(s)	Length
1.	"The Way I Am"		4:44
2.	"Sock It to Ya!"	Dino; Charles Hodges; Darryl Carter; Michael Berrin; O. V. Wright; Rich Lawson	4:43
3.	"Ooh Child"	Stan Vincent	4:14
4.	"Back to the Heart"	Dino; Mark Holden	5:05
5.	"Endlessly"		4:06
6.	"Tonight's the Night"		5:11
7.	"Just for the Sex of It"		4:20
8.	"The Feeling"	Dino; Darby Slick	4:44
9.	"She Ain't Shy"		4:12
10.	"Let Yourself Go"		4:36

== Charts ==
Singles

Year	Single	Chart	Position
1993	"Ooh Child"	The Billboard Hot 100	27
1993	"Endlessly"	The Billboard Hot 100	—
