= Ricky Hyslop =

Canadian violinist, conductor, composer and arranger

Ricky Hyslop (26 April 1915 – 2 June 1998) was a Canadian violinist, conductor, composer, and arranger. He was commissioned to write works by the Buffalo Philharmonic (the symphonic poems Toronto 1830 and Mizu Uni), clarinetist Avrahm Galper (Peanut Suite for solo clarinet), and guitarist Gregory Alliston (Barca for guitar and soprano). Several of his works for violin have been published by The Frederick Harris Music Co, Limited, including three graded volumes for teaching purposes between 1987–1989.

== Life and career ==
Born in Vancouver, Hyslop began his violin studies as a child in his native city with Allard de Ridder and Jean de Rimanoczy. He began his performance career as a teenager performing as a soloist on CNRV radio. Early on in his career he served as concertmaster or as a member of various orchestras associated with the CRBC and CBC in Vancouver.

In 1941 Hyslop became music director for CBC Vancouver's Harmony House, a program featuring the singers Pat Morgan and Suzanne and the pianist Bud Henderson. He continued in that position up through 1953, during which time he also worked as a conductor for CBC Radio on such variety shows as Here's Juliette, String Along, and Scored by Hyslop among others. In 1959 he relocated to Toronto to become the music director for CBC Television's Talent Caravan. He left that program after a short time, returning to CBC Radio where he was music director for such programs as 1967 and All That and CBC Song Market among other programs during the 1960s.

Hyslop also worked as a composer for the CBC, writing incidental music for such CBC TV drama series as The Serial, Opening of the West, Gold - the Fabulous Years, A Place for Everything, and A Gift to Last and contributing music to several TV specials. He also composed music for the CTV Television Network programs The Human Journey and Being Human and composed the film score for the 1977 feature film Why Shoot the Teacher. He later wrote the score for the 1995 CTV News video The Russian German War.

Hyslop died in Toronto in 1998 at the age of 83. In 2000 many of his original scores and papers became a part of the collection at the Library and Archives Canada. He was married to the singer Lorraine Johnson who notably wrote the lyrics to his one-act school operetta Sedna: An Arctic Legend which was published in 1982. Two of his children became professional musicians, daughter, pop singer Jane Child and son Rick Hyslop Jr. Jane Child included Rick Hyslop Jr's songs "Monument" and "Step Out of Time" on her 1993 album Here Not There.
