= Here Not There =

Studio album by Jane Child
- Released: August 24, 1993
- Recorded: 1991–1993
- Genre: Dance-pop; new jack swing; hard rock
- Length: 64:14
- Label: Warner Bros.
- Producer: Jane Child

Jane Child chronology
Jane Child (1989)	Here Not There (1993)	Surge (2002)

Singles from Here Not There
- 1. "Mona Lisa Smiles" Released: 1992; 2. "Here Not There" Released: 1993; 3. "Do Whatcha Do" Released: 1993; 4. "Perfect Love" Released: 1993; 5. "All I Do" Released: 1994

Professional ratings
Review scores
Source	Rating
Allmusic	2/5 stars

Here Not There is the second studio album by Canadian singer-songwriter Jane Child, released in 1993 by Warner Bros. Records. It was less successful than her 1989 debut and saw her undergoing a stylistic change; while her debut was mostly synthesized dance-pop with R&B undercurrents, Here Not There saw her edging away and mixing new jack swing rhythms with almost hard rock elements. The year prior to the release of the album, she contributed the song "Mona Lisa Smiles" to the film Freejack, which starred Emilio Estevez.

The album is notable in that it featured an outside writer in the form of Ricky Hyslop, her father; he wrote two tracks on the album ("Monument" and "Step Out Of Time"), whereas Child wrote all of the tracks on her previous album.

== Reception ==
Allmusic's Stephen Thomas Erlewine gave the album two stars of five stars, calling it "a more ambitious affair than her debut", but also said that she "did not write songs that could have elaborated her ideas".

== Track listing ==
All tracks are written by Jane Child, except where noted

No.	Title	Writer(s)	Length
1.	"Mona Lisa Smiles"		5:03
2.	"Do Whatcha Do"		5:16
3.	"Monument"	Ricky Hyslop	5:09
4.	"All I Do"		5:54
5.	"SSHHH"		4:52
6.	"Perfect Love"		6:09
7.	"I Do Not Feel as You Do"		4:29
8.	"Heavy Smile"		5:14
9.	"Calling"		5:23
10.	"Step Out of Time"	Hyslop	5:13
11.	"Sarasvati"		7:58
12.	"Here Not There"		3:38
Total length:			1:04:14

== Personnel ==
Musicians

- Jane Child – lead vocals, keyboards, synthesizers, synthesized bass, Hammond organ, programming, string arrangements
- James Harrah – guitars, bass, programming
- Bryan Hyslop – guitars
- Ricky Hyslop – guitars, backing vocals
- Aaron Gross – percussion
- Tal Bergman – drums, percussion

Production

- Jane Child – arrangement, production
- James Harrah – arrangement
- Paul Arnold – recording, engineering
- Jon Baker – recording, engineering
- Greg Droman – recording, engineering
- Michael Scott – recording, engineering
- Chris Lord-Alge – mixing
- Paul Lani – mix assistant
- Talley Sherwood – mix assistant
- Stephen Marcussen – mastering
- Jamie Seyberth – mastering
