= Don't You Come Cryin' =

Single by Linear

from the album Linear
- Released: 1990
- Genre: Freestyle
- Length: 3:47
- Label: Atlantic
- Songwriters: Charlie Pennachio, Tolga Katas, Gary Tutalo
- Producer: Tolga Katas

Linear singles chronology
"Sending All My Love" (1990)	"Don't You Come Cryin'" (1990)	"Something Going On" (1990)

"Don't You Come Cryin" is a song by American freestyle-pop group Linear, released in 1990 by Atlantic Records, as the second single from their debut album, Linear (1990). The song is written by Charlie Pennachio, Tolga Katas and Gary Tutalo, and produced by Katas. It peaked at No. 70 and 72 on the US Billboard Hot 100 and Cash Box Top 100 charts.

== Charts ==
Chart (1990)	Peak position
US Billboard Hot 100	70
US Cash Box Top 100	72
