= Surge (album) =

Studio album by Jane Child
- Released: January 8, 2002
- Recorded: 2001
- Genre: Synth-pop; electronic; industrial
- Length: 57:10
- Label: Sugarwave
- Producer: Jane Child

Jane Child chronology
Here Not There (1993)	Surge (2002)	Surge Remixed (2002)

Singles from Surge
- 1. "Almost Beautiful" Released: 2001; 2. "Nice Day" Released: 2002

Professional ratings
Review scores
Source	Rating
Allmusic	4/5 stars

Surge is the third studio album by Canadian singer-songwriter Jane Child, released in 2002 by her own record label Sugarwave.

== Reception ==
Allmusic's Robert L. Doerschuk gave the album four stars of five stars, commenting that "Child's talent is formidable, her willingness to take risks is laudable -- and the price she pays for it all in the marketplace with Surge is, unfortunately, predictable."

== Track listing ==
All tracks are written by Jane Child.

No.	Title	Length
1.	"Almost Beautiful"	4:33
2.	"You, Bluebird"	4:44
3.	"Words I Know"	4:33
4.	"Lootsville"	4:39
5.	"Nice Day"	4:14
6.	"The Willow Tree"	7:24
7.	"Honeymine"	5:38
8.	"Ramona, My Love"	4:44
9.	"Yellow Days"	4:33
10.	"Feverush"	7:50
11.	"Sworn"	4:18
Total length:		57:10

== Personnel ==
Musicians

- Jane Child – lead vocals, keyboards, guitars
- Cat Gray – drums, synthesizer

Production

- Jane Child – arrangement, production
- Cat Gray – mixing
- Stephen Marcussen – mastering
