= I Like It (Dino song) =

Single by Dino

from the album 24/7
- Released: 1989
- Genre: Dance-pop; new jack swing
- Length: 3:53
- Label: 4th & B'way/Island
- Songwriter: Dino
- Producer: Dino

Dino singles chronology
"24/7" (1989)	"I Like It" (1989)	"Sunshine" (1989)

"I Like It" is a song recorded by American singer-songwriter Dino. It was released in 1989 as the third single from his album 24/7. The single peaked at No. 7 on the Billboard Hot 100 and No. 3 on the Hot Dance Music/Club Play chart in the United States. In Canada, it reached the top 30 of the 100 most played tracks, and reached No. 1 on the dance music chart.

== Music video ==
The music video was directed by ? and premiered on MTV & VH-1 in 1989.

== Tracks ==
All tracks are written by Dino.

7" vinyl/cassette single
No.	Title	Length
1.	"I Like It" (Radio Edit)	3:53
2.	"I Like It" (Instrumental)	3:49

12" vinyl
No.	Title	Length
1.	"I Like It" (Extended Vocal)	5:28
2.	"I Like It" (House Vocal)	6:20
3.	"I Like It" (Percapella)	2:37
4.	"I Like It" (Bonus Beats)	1:58
5.	"I Like It" (7" Edit)	3:58
6.	"I Like It" (Sample Dub)	5:10
7.	"I Like It" (Sky's Dub)	6:18

== Charts ==
=== Weekly charts ===
Chart (1989)	Peak position
Canada RPM Dance/Urban	1
Canada RPM Top 100 Singles	30
Canada RPM Top Singles 30 Retail	25
New Zealand RIANZ	8
US Billboard Hot 100	7
US Hot Dance Music/Club Play	3
US Hot Dance Music/Maxi-Singles Sales	9
US Hot Black Singles	25

=== Year-end charts ===
Chart (1989)	Position
Canada RPM Dance Top 25 Singles of '89	11
US Billboard Hot 100	56

== Certifications ==
Country	Music recording sales certification	Date	Sales certified
United States	Gold	18 September 1989	500,000
