= Dino (American singer) =

- Also known as: Dean Esposito, Dino Esposito
- Born: Dean Esposito; July 20, 1963 (age 62); Los Angeles, California
- Genres: Freestyle, dance
- Occupations: Radio programming director dj singer-songwriter record producer
- Instruments: Vocals keyboards
- Years active: 1987–Present
- Labels: 4th & B'way/Island/PolyGram; EastWest/WEA

Dean Esposito (born July 20, 1963), better known as Dino, is an American DJ, singer-songwriter, and record producer.

== Early life ==
Dean Esposito was born to Frank and Francis Esposito in the Encino district of Los Angeles, California. The family later moved to Hawaii and Connecticut before settling in Las Vegas, Nevada, where his father became a restaurant owner. It was here that Dino pursued his musical interests. He earned his bachelor's degree in communications/broadcasting and music at the University of Nevada, Las Vegas. Shortly after, he accepted a job as a program director/radio DJ at his college radio station, with his own morning show called "Urban Sunrise". Soon, he moved on to become a Top-40 DJ at Nevada radio station Power 97. Subsequently, he was offered a job at KCEP, Las Vegas' largest black music station, where he eventually became program director. During this time he also moonlighted as a local club DJ.

== Music career ==
Dino then became a singer, first as part of the group Esquire, and later as a solo artist. His first single "Summergirls" was recorded and released in 1987 on the independent label L.D. Records. He then signed with 4th & B'way/Island/PolyGram Records, and in 1988 they re-released his debut single. In 1989, his debut album 24/7 was released, from which the singles "24/7," "I Like It", "Sunshine", and "Never 2 Much of U" were released. "In the City" was also released, but only as a 12-inch single primarily for dance-club play; it was not released to radio.

During this initial up-swing of his career, Dino performed at theme parks, sharing the bill with such artists as Sweet Sensation and Linear. Dino developed an even wider fanbase when he became the opening act for New Kids on the Block in the summer of 1989.

His touring band was composed of Jeff Lams (Piano), Keith Nelson (Bass), Gary Olds (Drums), Paul Taylor (Saxophone) and Bryan Bywaters (Keyboards). Two dancers were added, Rob Hathcock and Kevin Robinson. This original lineup was his only touring band. Dino and his band made the late-night talk-show circuit, although some appearances were with alternate musicians such as Paul Pesco (guitar), Basil Fung (guitar), Rich Young (drums), and Melvin Davis (bass). TV performances included The Pat Sajak Show, The Arsenio Hall Show (with Paul Pesco on guitar and Rich Young on drums), Friday Night Videos (with Basil Fung on guitar, Melvin Davis on bass, and Rich Young on drums), and many others.

1990 saw the release of his sophomore LP, titled Swingin', from which the singles "Romeo" and "Gentle" were released. The latter was a cover of Frederick's 1984 R&B hit "Gentle (Calling Your Name)." During this time, he established a production company and record label, ONID Productions (his name spelled backward).

He released his third album The Way I Am in 1993 on the EastWest Records label, on which he scored his last Top-40 hit, a cover of The Five Stairsteps' "O-o-h Child". A final single was also released, the non-charting ballad "Endlessly."

After his singing career faded, he began producing and writing songs with such artists as Tonya Mitchell, Paul Taylor, Jordan Knight, Walter Beasley, Sheena Easton, and Joanna Pacitti, the latter of whose collaborative song "Watch Me Shine" was included on the Legally Blonde motion picture soundtrack.

== Select discography ==
=== Albums ===
Date	Album	Label	Positions United States	Music recording sales certification
1989	24/7	4th & B'way/Island/PolyGram Records	34	Gold
August 13, 1990	Swingin'	Island/PolyGram Records	82	
August 3, 1993	The Way I Am	EastWest Records	–	

== Singles ==
Year	Single	Peak chart positions						Album
Year	Single	Hot 100	Hot R&B	Dance Singles	Dance Play	Rhythmic Top40	Top 40 Main	Album
1987	"Summergirls"	50	—	40	—	—	—	24/7
1989	"24/7"	42	12	31	43	—	—	24/7
1989	"I Like It"	7	25	9	3	—	—	24/7
1989	"Sunshine"	23	47	—	—	—	—	24/7
1989	"Never 2 Much of U"	61	69	—	—	—	—	24/7
1990	"Romeo"	6	69	45	35	—	—	Swingin'
1990	"Gentle"	31	31	—	—	—	—	Swingin'
1993	"Ooh Child"	27	—	—	—	30	4	The Way I Am
1993	"Endlessly"	114	—	—	—	—	—	The Way I Am

=== Music videos ===
Year	Video	Director
1989	"24/7"	Dan Lawrence Productions
1989	"I Like It"	Jim Hershleder
1989	"Sunshine"	
1990	"Romeo"	
1990	"Gentle"	
1993	"O-o-h Child"	
