= Sending All My Love =

Single by Linear

from the album Linear
- Released: February 15, 1990
- Genre: Freestyle
- Length: 3:54 (album version)
- Label: Atlantic
- Songwriters: Charlie Pennachio; Tolga Katas
- Producer: Tolga Katas

Linear singles chronology
"Sending All My Love" (1990)	"Don't You Come Cryin'" (1990)

"Sending All My Love" is a song by American freestyle/pop group Linear from their debut album, Linear (1990). Released as the debut single, it was their biggest hit, peaking at No. 5 on both the US Billboard Hot 100 and Cash Box Top 100. The single was certified gold (500,000 units sold) on May 18, 1990. It was produced by Tolga Katas and written by Katas and Charlie Pennachio.

== Track listing ==
US 12" single

No.	Title	Length
1.	"Sending All My Love" (Extended Club Mix)	6:50
2.	"Sending All My Love" (Jones Beats)	3:07
3.	"Sending All My Love" (Accapella)	2:05
4.	"Sending All My Love" (Instrumental Dub)	5:31
5.	"Sending All My Love" (Vocal Dub)	3:58
6.	"Sending All My Love" (Radio Mix)	3:48

US 12" single (1990)

No.	Title	Length
1.	"Sending All My Love" (1990 Club Mix)	8:16
2.	"Sending All My Love" (Radio Mix)	3:52
3.	"Sending All My Love" (Instrumental)	3:43

Germany 12" single (1990)

No.	Title	Length
1.	"Sending All My Love" (1990 Club Mix)	8:18
2.	"Sending All My Love" (1990 House Mix)	5:00
3.	"Sending All My Love" (Radio Mix)	3:52

== Charts ==
=== Weekly charts ===
Chart (1990–1991)	Peak position
Canada Top Singles (RPM)	20
Canada Dance/Urban (RPM)	3
New Zealand (Recorded Music NZ)	13
US Billboard Hot 100	5
US Hot Dance Music/Maxi-Singles Sales (Billboard)	8
US Cash Box Top 100	5

=== Year-end charts ===
Chart (1990)	Position
Canada Dance/Urban (RPM)	31
New Zealand (Recorded Music NZ)	36
US Top Pop Singles (Billboard)	31
US Cash Box Top 100	43

== Certifications ==
Country	Certification	Date	Sales certified
U.S.	Gold	May 18, 1990	500,000
