= No More Lies (Michel'le song) =

Single by Michel'le

from the album Michel'le
- B-side: "Never Been in Love"
- Released: October 13, 1989
- Recorded: 1989
- Genre: R&B; dance
- Label: Ruthless; Atco; Atlantic
- Songwriters: Dr. Dre; Laylaw; Michel'le
- Producer: Dr. Dre

Michel'le singles chronology
"No More Lies" (1989)	"Nicety" (1989)

"No More Lies" is the debut single by American R&B artist Michel'le. It was released in 1989 as the lead single from her self-titled debut album, and became a top 10 hit in the US. The song includes guest vocals performed by Dr. Dre. In a list of the 40 greatest songs produced by Dr. Dre, Rolling Stone ranked “No More Lies” at number 39, writing: “Dre’s bass-y, synthesized funk serves as a platform for Michel’le’s distinctively high-powered yet swinging voice.”

== Composition ==
The Washington Post speculated that "No More Lies" was written about Michel'le's then-boyfriend Dr. Dre, who was abusive toward her and notoriously unfaithful.

== Music video ==
A music video for the song was released. It depicted Michel'le at a dinner party, singing and dancing while interacting with the guests, and also depicts Dr. Dre who calls and interacts with Michel'le and an uncredited cameo by Eazy-E. The official music video was directed by Jane Simpson - who would also direct the video for the second single, "Nicety".

== Commercial performance ==
"No More Lies" was a top 10 hit in the US, reaching number 7 on the Billboard Hot 100 and number 2 on the Hot R&B/Hip-Hop Songs chart (behind "It's Gonna Be Alright" by Ruby Turner and "Where Do We Go from Here" by Stacy Lattisaw and Johnny Gill, neither of which entered the Hot 100). The song was certified gold by the RIAA less than a year after its release. The song remains her most successful single, though "Nicety" and "Something in My Heart" were also top 40 hits in the US.

== Track listings ==
US promotional CD single

1. "No More Lies" (LP Version) — 3:45
2. "No More Lies" (Extended Dance Mix) — 6:20
3. "No More Lies" (More Lies Version) — 1:50
4. "No More Lies" (Instrumental) — 3:55

US cassette

1. "No More Lies" — 3:42
2. "Never Been in Love" — 3:41

US 7"

A. "No More Lies" — 3:42
B. "Never Been in Love" — 3:41

Japan mini-CD single

1. "No More Lies" — 3:42
2. "Never Been in Love" — 3:41

== Charts ==
Chart (1989–1990)	Peak position
Australia ARIA Charts	153
UK Singles (OCC)	78
US Billboard Hot 100	7
US Dance Club Songs (Billboard)	7
US Dance Singles Sales (Billboard)	1
US Hot R&B/Hip-Hop Songs (Billboard)	2

Chart (1990)	Position
US Top Pop Singles (Billboard)	50

== Certifications ==
Region	Certification	Certified units/sales
United States (RIAA)	Gold	500,000^{^}
^{^} Shipments figures based on certification alone.
