= Girls Nite Out (Tyler Collins album) =

1989 studio album by Tyler Collins

Studio album by Tyler Collins
- Released: October 20, 1989
- Recorded: 1988–1989
- Genre: R&B
- Length: 47:10
- Label: RCA
- Producer: Andre Cleveland

Tyler Collins chronology
Girls Nite Out (1989)	Tyler (1992)

Singles from Girls Nite Out
- 1. "Whatcha Gonna Do" Released: 1989; 2. "Girls Nite Out" Released: 1990; 3. "Second Chance" Released: 1990

Professional ratings
Review scores
Source	Rating
AllMusic	2/5 stars

Girls Nite Out is the debut studio album by American contemporary R&B singer Tyler Collins, released October 20, 1989, via RCA Records. The album peaked at No. 85 on the Billboard 200 and No. 22 on the Billboard R&B chart in 1990.

Three singles were released from the album: "Whatcha Gonna Do", "Girls Nite Out" and "Second Chance". "Girls Nite Out" was the most successful single from the album, peaking at No. 6 on the Billboard Hot 100 in 1990.

== Track listing ==
No.	Title	Writer(s)	Producer(s)	Length
1.	"Strut"	Tom Lyle	Carl Crawford; Tom Lyle	4:28
2.	"Girls Nite Out"	Darryl Ross	Sheri Byers	4:37
3.	"Whatcha Gonna Do"	Tyler Collins; Phillip Gordy	Daryl Godfrey	5:45
4.	"Love Talk"	Darryl Ross	Sheri Byers	3:44
5.	"Give and Take"	Donald Robinson	Dennis Nelson; Wayne Vaughn	5:43
6.	"I Only Wanted"	Tyler Collins; Wardell Potts, Jr.	Wardell Potts, Jr.	4:53
7.	"Second Chance"	Wardell Potts, Jr.; Melissa Ritter	Wardell Potts, Jr.	4:22
8.	"Beyond a Shadow of a Doubt"	Wardell Potts, Jr.; Gerry Stober	Jeff Lorber	5:03
9.	"Two in Love"	Stevie Wonder	Stevie Wonder	5:00
10.	"You and Me" (featuring Grady Harrell)	Stevie Wonder	Stevie Wonder	3:35
Total length:				47:10

== Charts ==
=== Weekly charts ===
Chart (1990)	Peak position
US Billboard 200	85
US Top R&B/Hip-Hop Albums (Billboard)	22

=== Year-end charts ===
Chart (1990)	Position
US Top R&B/Hip-Hop Albums (Billboard)	66
