= Billboard Year-End Hot Rap Singles of 1990 =

American music chart

This is a list of Billboard magazine's Top Rap songs of 1990.

| No. | Title | Artist(s) |
|---|---|---|
| 1 | "Expression" | Salt-n-Pepa |
| 2 | "The Humpty Dance" | Digital Underground |
| 3 | "Buddy" | De La Soul |
| 4 | "The Power" | Snap! |
| 5 | "Call Me D-Nice" | D-Nice |
| 6 | "Beepers" | Sir Mix-a-Lot |
| 7 | "Murder Rap" | Above the Law |
| 8 | "Ownleeeue" | Kwamé |
| 9 | "Funhouse" | Kid 'n Play |
| 10 | "Me So Horny" | 2 Live Crew |
| 11 | "New Jack Swing" | Wrecks-n-Effect |
| 12 | "We're All in the Same Gang" | The West Coast Rap All-Stars |
| 13 | "The Boomin' System" | LL Cool J |
| 14 | "Treat Them Like They Want to Be Treated" | Father MC |
| 15 | "The Power" | Snap! |
| 16 | "Let the Rhythm Hit 'Em" | Eric B. & Rakim |
| 17 | "AmeriKKKa's Most Wanted" | Ice Cube |
| 18 | "911 Is a Joke" | Public Enemy |
| 19 | "Welcome to the Terrordome" | Public Enemy |
| 20 | "Pump It Hottie" | Redhead Kingpin and the F.B.I. |
| 21 | "The D.O.C. & The Doctor" | The D.O.C. |
| 22 | "U Can't Touch This" | MC Hammer |
| 23 | "Ice Ice Baby" | Vanilla Ice |
| 24 | "Cha Cha Cha" | MC Lyte |
| 25 | "Rock Dis Funky Joint" | Poor Righteous Teachers |
| 26 | "Knockin' Boots" | Candyman |
| 27 | "Somebody for Me" | Heavy D & the Boyz |
| 28 | "Love's Gonna Get'cha" | Boogie Down Productions |
| 29 | "Pawns in the Game" | Professor Griff |
| 30 | "Just a Friend" | Biz Markie |

== See also ==
- 1990 in music
- Billboard Year-End Hot 100 singles of 1990
- List of Billboard number-one rap singles of 1990
