= Boys Night Out =

Boys' or Boy's Night Out may refer to:

== Film and TV ==
- Boys' Night Out (film), a 1962 comedy
- Boys' Night Out (1996 film), starring Wil Wheaton
- "Boy's Night Out", an episode of the TV series Murphy's Law
- "Boy's Night Out", an episode of the TV series Benson

== Music ==
- Boys Night Out (radio), an evening radio program on Filipino station Magic 89.9
- Boys Night Out (band), a Canadian emo/post-hardcore band
- Boys Night Out (album), their self-titled album
- "Boys' Night Out" (song), a song from the 1962 film, performed by Patti Page
- "Boys Night Out" (song), a single by Timothy B. Schmit
- "Boys' Night Out", a song from the Sammy Hagar's 1987 album, I Never Said Goodbye.
