= 24/7 (Dino album) =

Studio album by Dino
- Released: 1989
- Genre: Pop, dance-pop
- Length: 45:52
- Label: 4th & B'way/Island/PolyGram Records; 444 011
- Producer: Dino

Dino chronology
24/7 (1989)	Swingin' (1990)

Singles from 24/7
- 1. "Summergirls" Released: 1988; 2. "24/7" Released: 1989; 3. "I Like It" Released: June 30, 1989; 4. "Sunshine" Released: September 1989; 5. "In the City" Released: December 7, 1989 (12" dance club single); 6. "Never 2 Much of U" Released: 1989

Professional ratings
Review scores
Source	Rating
AllMusic	2/5 stars

24/7 is the first album by the pop singer-songwriter Dino. He wrote and arranged all the songs, produced the album, played keyboards and programmed drums. The album was certified gold by the RIAA. In 1989, 24/7 reached No. 34 on the Billboard 200 and No. 47 on the Top R&B/Hip-Hop Albums for Billboard.

In the US, five singles were released from the album. The first, "Summergirls", appeared as a 12-inch single in 1987 on the independent label L.D. Records. It was re-released in 1988 after Dino had signed to 4th & B'way/Island/PolyGram Records, and reached a peak position of number 50 on the Billboard Hot 100. (These were released well before the album.) After the album was released in summer 1989, the title track, "24/7", peaked at number 42 on the Hot 100 and number 12 on the R&B chart. The third single, "I Like It", peaked at number 7, while reaching number 3 on the dance chart. The single achieved gold sales status. The fourth track to be released, "Sunshine", peaked at number 23 on the pop chart and the last single, the ballad "Never 2 Much of U", peaked at number 61.

== Track listing ==
All tracks are written by Dino.

No.	Title	Length
1.	"The Opening/No More Heartbreak"	6:14
2.	"I Like It"	5:16
3.	"Never 2 Much of U"	5:27
4.	"Summergirls" (Remix)	6:12
5.	"Boyfriend-Girlfriend"	4:21
6.	"Real Love"	4:24
7.	"24/7"	4:16
8.	"Sunshine"	3:46
9.	"In the City"	5:56

CD Edition

No.	Title	Length
10.	"Nighttime Lovekind"	6:09

== Production ==
- Producer: Dino
- Engineers: Liz Cluse, Chris Fuhrman
- Mixing: Alan Meyerson
- Re-mixing: Frankie Anoble, R.O.B.
- Mastering: Herb Powers Jr.

== Personnel ==
- Dino – lead & backing vocals, keyboards, keyboard and drum programming
- Buzz Feiten, Paul Jackson Jr., Paul Pesco – guitars
- Jeff Lorber – keyboards, piano
- Keith Nelson – bass guitar
- R.O.B. – scratching, drum programming
- Paul Taylor – saxophone
- Linda Brown, Brian Bywaters – backing vocals
