= Romeo (Dino song) =

1990 single by Dino

Single by Dino featuring Doctor Ice

from the album Swingin'
- Released: July 30, 1990
- Genre: New Jack Swing, contemporary R&B
- Length: 4:10
- Label: Island
- Songwriters: Dean Esposito; Frederick Reeves
- Producer: Dino

Dino singles chronology
"Never 2 Much of U" (1990)	"Romeo" (1990)	"Gentle" (1990)

"Romeo" is a song written and produced by American DJ and singer-songwriter Dino, featuring a rap by Doctor Ice (of UTFO). The song is the opening track on his second album, Swingin' (1990), and was issued as the album's first single in July 1990. It is Dino's biggest hit to date in the United States, peaking at numbers six and seven on the US Billboard Hot 100 and Cash Box Top 100.

== Track listing ==
All songs written and produced by Dino; all songs feature Doctor Ice except tracks 3 and 5.

1. "Romeo" (12” remix) – 5:32
2. "Romeo" (Red Zone Mix) – 5:30
3. "Romeo" (Instrumental) – 5:15
4. "Romeo" (Radio Edit) – 4:10
5. "Romeo" (Dub Version) – 4:08
6. "Romeo" (Loop A Pella) – 4:18

== Charts ==
=== Weekly charts ===
Weekly chart performance for "Romeo"
Chart (1990–1991)	Peak position
Australia (ARIA)	105
Canada Top Singles (RPM)	32
New Zealand (RIANZ)	48
US Billboard Hot 100	6
US Hot Dance Music/Club Play (Billboard)	35
US Hot R&B Singles (Billboard)	69
US Cash Box Top 100	7

=== Year-end charts ===
Year-end chart performance for "Dino"
Chart (1990)	Position
US Billboard Hot 100	80
