= ATCO Records =

American record label

- Parent company: Warner Music Group
- Founded: July 1955; 70 years ago
- Founder: Herb Abramson
- Distributors: Atlantic Records Group; (US); Warner Music Group; (International); Rhino Entertainment Company; (re-issues)
- Genre: Various
- Country of origin: United States
- Location: 1633 Broadway, New York, New York, US
- Official website: atcorecords.com

ATCO Records is an American record label founded in 1955. It is owned by Warner Music Group and operates as an imprint of Atlantic Records. After several decades of dormancy and infrequent activity under alternating Warner Music labels, the company was relaunched by Atlantic Records in early 2020.

== History ==
=== 1950s–1960s: Beginnings ===
ATCO Records was devised as an outlet for productions by one of Atlantic Records' co-founders, Herb Abramson, who had returned to the company from military service. The label was also intended as a home for acts that did not fit the format of the main Atlantic brand, which was releasing blues, jazz, rhythm and blues and soul. The planned name for the label was Atlas. But it was changed to ATCO when it was discovered there was already an Atlas Records. The ATCO name is an abbreviation of Atlantic Corporation. ATCO also provided distribution for other labels, including RSO, Volt, Island, Modern, Ruthless, Hansa, and Rolling Stones Records. For most of its history, ATCO was known for pop and rock music, but during its early years, it produced some jazz albums. These included Harry Arnold, Betty Carter, King Curtis, Herb Geller, Roland Hanna, and Helen Merrill.

ATCO's rock era began with Bobby Darin and The Coasters. In the early 1960s, Atlantic began to license material from international sources, leading to instrumental hit singles from Jorgen Ingmann, Acker Bilk and Bent Fabricius-Bjerre. Starting in the mid-1960s, ATCO moved into rock-and-roll with Sonny and Cher, Buffalo Springfield, Vanilla Fudge, Iron Butterfly and Cream (the latter under license from British label Polydor).

In 1964, ATCO released a single in the US by the Beatles, "Ain't She Sweet", with lead vocals by John Lennon (flip side "Nobody's Child", with lead singer Tony Sheridan), which had been recorded in Hamburg in 1961. "Ain't She Sweet" reached No. 19 on the Billboard Hot 100 chart in August 1964. It featured new drums overdubbed by session drummer Bernard Purdie. ATCO also released an album entitled Ain't She Sweet which featured the other two tracks by Sheridan and The Beatles from the Hamburg session and filled out by eight other songs covered by The Swallows.

In 1966, ATCO released "Substitute" by the Who. The song was issued through an arrangement with UK Polydor Records because of the dispute The Who was having with their producer, Shel Talmy, and their contract with US Decca Records and UK Brunswick Records. This would be the only Who recording to appear on ATCO, although Pete Townshend and John Entwistle would eventually sign to ATCO as solo artists, and Roger Daltrey later signed a US solo deal with Atlantic. This release differs from the UK release with a different structure/edit (the break comes in after the first verse vs. second), a substitute lyric ("I try walking forward but my feet walk back" in place of "I look all white but my dad was black").

=== 1970s–1980s: Downsizing ===
During the 1970s, Atlantic Records began to broaden the range of its own roster, causing ATCO to become deemphasized as many of its acts would eventually have their material released under the main Atlantic brand. In the middle 1970s, ATCO became increasingly used for hard rock acts and some British and European bands. During this time, the label issued early albums from AC/DC. Starting in 1978, however, AC/DC releases were issued on Atlantic until their contract with the label ended in the 1990s. In 1980, ATCO's visibility rose with strong chart performances from Pete Townshend's Empty Glass album and the song "Cars" by Gary Numan. As the 1980s wore on, ATCO continued to have streamlined success with artists such as Sweet Sensation, JJ Fad and Michel'le (the latter who were signed to the label in conjunction with Ruthless Records), while steadily becoming less active overall.

=== 1990s: Merger with EastWest Records America and dormancy ===
The last number one hit on ATCO was "If Wishes Came True" by Sweet Sensation in 1990. The following year, Atlantic Records Senior VP Sylvia Rhone orchestrated the merger of ATCO with Atlantic's fledgling EastWest Records America label and briefly operated the combination as Atco/EastWest Records. By 1994, however, the ATCO name was dropped and the label reverted to the EastWest Records America branding. During this time, EastWest moved its operations to Atlantic's sister label Elektra Records. As a result of Elektra's takeover of EastWest, ATCO's back catalog and retained artists fell under its control. In the decade to come, the ATCO name and logo would be occasionally used on reissues of past material, but the imprint itself was now dormant.

=== 2000s: Revival under Rhino Entertainment ===
In 2005, after more than a decade in hibernation, ATCO (in a joint venture with Rhino Records) released the soundtrack of the Bobby Darin biopic Beyond the Sea, which starred Kevin Spacey and featured his renditions of Darin's songs. This led to Warner Music Group reactivating the label in 2006 in conjunction with Rhino. Scarlett Johansson, Keith Sweat and Art Garfunkel were among the first artists signed to the label. Garfunkel issued Some Enchanted Evening on January 30, 2007. Johansson issued Anywhere I Lay My Head on May 20, 2008. Queensrÿche released its American Soldier album on ATCO on March 31, 2009. The New York Dolls released its album Cause I Sez So on ATCO on May 5, 2009. Shortly thereafter, ATCO would become dormant again.

=== 2020s: Return to Atlantic Records and second relaunch ===
In 2020, ATCO returned to the aegis of Atlantic Records, where it was relaunched. On February 14, Billboard announced that Atlantic Records President of A&R Pete Ganbarg was appointed president of the newly relaunched ATCO Records. Ganbarg's first ATCO signing is Philadelphia-based alternative act Zero 9:36.

== Roster ==
The following is a list of artists who have recorded for ATCO Records.

- AC/DC (outside Australia)
- Airrace
- Allman Brothers Band (Capricorn/Atco)
- Andy Williams
- Steve Arrington
- Back Street Crawler
- Barrabás
- The Beatles (US)
- Bad Company
- Badger
- Ginger Baker (including Ginger Baker's Air Force and Baker Gurvitz Army) (US/Canada)
- Jeff Beck
- Bee Gees (US/Canada)
- Chuck Berry
- Mr Acker Bilk (US/Canada)
- Black Oak Arkansas
- Blackfoot
- Blind Faith (US/Canada)
- Blue Mountain Eagle
- Blue Magic
- Blues Image
- Sonny Bono (as "Sonny")
- Brooklyn Brothers
- Jack Bruce (US/Canada)
- Buffalo Springfield
- Cactus
- The Capitols
- Jim Carroll
- Change
- Cher
- Corina
- Eric Clapton (US/Canada)
- The Coasters
- Cold Grits
- Natalie Cole (Modern/Atco)
- Arthur Conley
- Cream (US/Canada)
- Cross Country
- Bobby Darin
- Spencer Davis Group (US/Canada)
- Delaney & Bonnie and Friends
- Diesel
- The D.O.C. (Ruthless/Atco)
- Dr. John
- Dream Theater
- Julie Driscoll, Brian Auger & The Trinity
- Dave Edmunds
- Jonathan Edwards (Capricorn/Atco)
- Eight Seconds
- Electric Boys
- Enuff Z'Nuff
- Envy
- John Entwistle
- Bent Fabric and his Piano
- Scott Fagan
- Gary Farr
- Fat Mattress
- Fatback
- The Fireballs
- Tricia Leigh Fisher
- Flies on Fire
- Focus (US/Canada)
- The Fourmost
- Peter Gabriel (US/Canada)
- Art Garfunkel
- Genesis (US/Canada)
- Golden Earring (US/Canada)
- Gregory Gray
- R. B. Greaves
- Tim Hardin
- Gordon Haskell
- Donny Hathaway
- Hawkwind
- Horslips (US)
- Humble Pie
- Steve Hunter
- Jorgen Ingmann
- INXS (US/Canada)
- Iron Butterfly
- Deon Jackson (Carla)
- James Gang
- J. J. Fad (Ruthless/Atco)
- Robbin Julien
- Scarlett Johansson
- Juicy Lucy
- Michael Kamen
- Ben E. King
- King Curtis
- Last Words
- Bettye LaVette
- Lime (Critique/Atco)
- Lindisfarne (US/Canada)
- Loudness
- Lulu
- Manowar
- Penny McLean
- Michel'le (Ruthless/Atco)
- Gary Moore (Mirage/Atco) (US)
- New York Dolls
- New York Rock & Roll Ensemble
- Stevie Nicks (Modern/Atco) (US/Canada)
- Nina & Frederik (US/Canada)
- Gary Numan (US/Canada)
- Outlaw Blood
- Outrage
- Pantera
- Pat & The Satellites
- The Persuaders
- Pleasure Bombs
- Queensrÿche
- The Raindogs
- Chris Rea (US)
- Otis Redding (Stax/Atco)
- Ann Richards
- Bob Rivers (Critique/Atco)
- The Robins
- The Rose Garden
- Rebel Heels (Atco Aus)
- Rowan & Martin
- Roxy Music (US/Canada)
- Shadows Of Knight (Dunwich/Atco)
- Shannon (Mirage/Atco)
- The Sherbs
- Kym Sims
- Slave
- P. F. Sloan
- Sonny & Cher
- Southside Johnny & the Jukes (Mirage/Atco)
- Keith Sweat
- Sweet Sensation
- The System (Mirage/Atco)
- Taffy
- Tangier
- Livingston Taylor (Capricorn/Atco)
- Nino Tempo & April Stevens
- Nolan Thomas (Mirage/Atco)
- Pete Townshend (US/Canada)
- The Troggs
- Vandenberg
- Vanilla Fudge
- Jerry Jeff Walker
- Dee Dee Warwick
- Stevie Wright (US/Canada)
- Yes
- Yomo & Maulkie (Ruthless/Atco)
