= If Wishes Came True =

1990 single by Sweet Sensation

Single by Sweet Sensation

from the album Love Child
- B-side: "LP Preview"
- Released: June 1990
- Genre: Pop rock; freestyle
- Length: 5:12 (album version); 4:49 (radio edit)
- Label: ATCO
- Songwriters: Deena Charles; Robert Steele; Russ DeSalvo
- Producer: Steve Peck

Sweet Sensation singles chronology
"Love Child" (1990)	"If Wishes Came True" (1990)	"Each and Every Time" (1990)

"If Wishes Came True" is a song by American musical trio Sweet Sensation from their second studio album, Love Child (1990). Written by Deena Charles, Robert Steele, and Russ DeSalvo and produced by Steve Peck, it was released as the album's second single in June 1990 by ATCO Records. It is the biggest hit of the group's career, reaching number one on the US Billboard Hot 100 chart in September 1990. The song also peaked within the top 30 in Canada and New Zealand.

According to The Billboard Book of Number One Hits, the members of the group "cried for days" after learning that their song had reached number one. Billboard named the song number 87 on their list of the "100 Greatest Girl Group Songs of All Time".

== Composition ==
The album version of the song begins with strings and a flamenco guitar, then quickly picks up into a synthesizer line, drumming, an electric guitar solo, and the vocal begins soon afterward. The edited version omits the strings-and-guitar intro.

== Music video ==
The video was filmed in New York City and alternates studio shots of the trio singing with outdoor shots of lead singer Betty LeBron walking in the rain and reminiscing, with flashbacks to sunny scenes of better days with her former boyfriend.

== Track listings ==
- US 7-inch and cassette single
- Canadian cassette single
- Australian 7-inch and cassette single
1. "If Wishes Came True" – 5:12
2. "LP Preview" – 5:24
- UK and European 7-inch single

A. "If Wishes Came True" (edit) – 4:15
B. "Love Child" (original version) – 4:10

- UK and European 12-inch single
- European maxi-CD single

A1. "If Wishes Came True" (LP version) – 5:12
A2. "Love Child" (original version) – 4:10
B1. "Love Child" (Rock the House) – 6:43

- Japanese mini-CD single
1. "If Wishes Came True"
2. "Bring It Back"

== Charts ==
=== Weekly charts ===
Chart (1990–1991)	Peak position
Australia (ARIA)	68
Canada Top Singles (RPM)	14
Canada Adult Contemporary (RPM)	8
Netherlands (Dutch Top 40 Tipparade)	19
Netherlands (Single Top 100)	73
New Zealand (Recorded Music NZ)	22
US Billboard Hot 100	1
US Adult Contemporary (Billboard)	8
US Cash Box Top 100	1

=== Year-end charts ===
Chart (1990)	Position
Canada Adult Contemporary (RPM)	76
US Billboard Hot 100	25
US Cash Box Top 100	20

== Release history ==
Region	Date	Format(s)	Label(s)	Ref.
United States	June 1990	7-inch vinyl; cassette	ATCO	
Japan	September 10, 1990	Mini-CD	ATCO	
Australia	October 15, 1990	7-inch vinyl; cassette	ATCO	
