= Linear (group) =

US musical group

- Origin: Fort Lauderdale, Florida, U.S.
- Genres: Pop; dance; freestyle
- Years active: 1989–present
- Labels: Atlantic; Futura; Raw; Hot
- Members: Charlie Pennachio; Wyatt Pauley; Raul Prestol
- Past members: Joey Restivo; Gerald Rappaport; Mark Acetelli; Ricki Archer; Steve Romanello; Phil Conneilly; Michael Dean; Ritchie Napolitano

Linear (pronounced: /lɪˈnɪər/; lin-EER) is an American freestyle-pop group from Fort Lauderdale, Florida.

The lineup originally consisted of founder, lead vocalist, and main songwriter Charlie Pennachio, bassist and guitar player Wyatt Pauley, percussion player Joey Restivo, drummer Gerald Rappaport, guitarist Phil Conneilly, and backup vocalist/keyboardist Ricki Archer. In 1990, the band had a hit with the gold single, "Sending All My Love," which was self-released on Futura Records by Pennachio and producer Tolga Katas. After the regional success of the single, founder Charlie Pennachio added the remaining band members Pauley, Restivo, Rappaport, Conneilly and Archer. In January 1990, Linear was signed as a trio after the departure of Rappaport, Conneilly, and Archer by Marc Nathan at Atlantic Records. Linear would achieve three billboard charted songs from 1989 thru 1992 "Sending All My Love" reached number 5 on the Billboard Hot 100 in May 1990. The same year, they released their first, self-titled album that also included the hit Don't You Come Cryin, followed in 1992 by their second Caught in the Middle. They had another hit with the single, "T.L.C.", which reached number 30 and was nearly three decades later named one of Rolling Stone's 75 Greatest Boy Band Songs. In subsequent years, the lineup would shuffle many times. Pauley took a brief hiatus from Linear to join his other band, Soko, signed to Atco Records. Pennachio would go on to add Mark Acetelli and Michael Dean to replace Pauley. Pauley would return in 1993, while Restivo would depart. Raul Prestol was then added.

Pennachio and Pauley remain as the current members of the original lineup with addition to Raul Prestol. While Restivo performs under "Joey from Linear".

== Career ==
After Pennachio and Tolga Katas finished recording "Sending All My Love," they would release it on their record label, Futura Records.

Atlantic Records re-released the single that charted in the U.S. Top 5 and earned RIAA Platinum certification. A self-titled album and two singles followed. Since then, Pennachio has become a music executive, manager, hit songwriter & producer.

== Discography ==
=== Studio albums ===
Year	Album details	Positions on parade	
Year	Album details	CAN	USA
1990	Linear: Released: March 21, 1990; Label: Atlantic Records	37	52
1992	Caught in the Middle: Released: April 28, 1992; Label: Atlantic Records	-	-
"-" denotes a release that did not make the stop.

=== Singles ===
Year	Single	Positions			Certifications	Album
Year	Single	CAN	US	NZ	Certifications	Album
1990	"Sending All My Love"	20	5	13	USA: Gold	Linear
1990	"Don't You Come Cryin'"	—	70	—		Linear
1990	"Something Going On"	—	—	—		Linear
1992	"T.L.C."	43	30	43		Caught in the Middle
1992	"Smile If You Like Sex"	—	—	—		Caught in the Middle
1994	"Let's Go All the Way"	—	—	—		12"/CD Single
"—" denotes a release that did not make the stop.
