= Jane Child =

Canadian singer-songwriter (born 1967)

- Born: Jane Loretta Hyslop; February 15, 1962 (age 64); Ontario, Canada
- Genres: Freestyle; pop; R&B; synth-pop; rock
- Occupations: Singer, songwriter, record producer
- Years active: 1987–2007
- Labels: Warner Bros.; Sugarwave
- Spouse: Cat Gray

Jane Loretta Hyslop (born February 15, 1962), known professionally as Jane Child, is a Canadian singer-songwriter and record-producer. Her single "Don't Wanna Fall in Love" was number two for three consecutive weeks on the Billboard Hot 100 from April 14 to April 28, 1990. She is also known for her unusual fashion style, which included a hairstyle made of spikes and ankle-length braids and a nose chain piercing.

== Early life ==
Child was born in Ontario, and is the daughter of Canadian classical musician Ricky Hyslop, while her mother was a singer and pianist. She has two brothers. Child was classically trained as a pianist during her youth. Her parents taught her how to play and sing by kindergarten. The first record she ever owned was the Beatles' Rubber Soul, purchased by her father so that she could learn the arrangement of "Michelle". Her exposure to funk music came from having Christmases in Fort Lauderdale, Florida, and listening to local music there on the beaches.

At age 12 she joined the Canadian Opera Company's children's chorus, and soon after studied piano briefly at the Royal Conservatory of Music under Samuel Dolin. At age 15 she dropped out of school despite good grades. While seeking a summer job she saw an ad in a newspaper for a band looking for a keyboardist, which she applied for and joined. It was a touring rock and roll band of Deadheads known as Summerhill that played remote northern Canadian towns, and paid her $25 a week. She played the synthesizer, piano, and organ, and sang in their shows for over 45 weeks in their first year together. She also had various other musical jobs, such as organist at the Anglican church in her neighbourhood and at horse-shows, playing piano for ballet classes and at piano bars, and recording jingles for commercials.

== Career ==
Eventually Child cut a demo tape in Hamilton, Ontario, with the engineer who owned the studio where she had been recording jingles. With a low budget, she would bus out to the studio and play all the instruments herself. Child was signed by a New York based production company after a partner in the company, who was a client of Child's entertainment lawyer, heard the tape. She subsequently relocated to New York and then Los Angeles. Adamant about producing her own music, Child left the label. After a bidding war with 13 other labels, she settled with Warner Bros. Records, who agreed to sign her on her own terms. At this time she was struggling to pay bills despite extravagant nights out for label meetings. One of her first potential breaks was when a publishing company sent a song she wrote to Maurice White, but in the end he chose not to record the song despite liking it.

Her debut album, Jane Child, released in 1989, was fully written and produced by Child, who also performed all the vocals and played all the instruments (except for the guitar parts), a rarity for a debut artist signed to a major label. Due to her musical style and her emphasis on control over her music, she was at the time labelled by the press as "the female Prince".

Her single "Don't Wanna Fall in Love", peaked at No. 2 on the Billboard Hot 100 in 1990. The song was also a big hit on the R&B chart, peaking at No. 6. Her previous single, "Welcome to the Real World", was a modest hit, peaking at No. 49 on the Billboard Hot 100.

In 1993, she released her second album, Here Not There. In the album, she broadened her R&B sound to mix it with traces of rock, grunge, and Eastern music. The album and its singles were commercial failures, and she was dropped from the label and kept a low profile for the rest of the decade, though she recorded a few collaborations with Japanese artists in that country.

In 2001, she re-recorded the song "World Lullabye" from her debut album and sold the single through her website. All proceeds were donated to the Twin Towers Fund.

Her third album, Surge, was released in early 2002 on her own label, Sugarwave.

She recorded a cover of Tina Turner's "We Don't Need Another Hero" for the tribute album, What's Love? A Tribute to Tina Turner, released in 2004.

== Artistry ==
Child's look was inspired by African and East Indian cultures, as well as the punk movement, which came from living amongst these diasporas in Toronto. Her notable hair style, which she started at the age of 17, would be redone once a month by 3 women taking 14 hours to do. Her musical influences included Stevie Wonder, the Sex Pistols, Led Zeppelin, Jimi Hendrix, Janis Joplin, Public Enemy, Mozart, Indian music, Alicia de Larrocha, and Glenn Gould.

Child would do her own cataloguing for programming, including the samples and sequences, often for 14 hours at a time. She writes left handed and would sing as she wrote, also coming up with the bass line with her left hand. In studio some of the gear she used included Fairlight, Sequential Circuits Prophet-5 and T-8, LinnDrum, E-mu SP12, Synclavier, Roland MSQ-700 and the Roland SBX-80. For tours her gear included a Minimoog, a Solina (ARP String Ensemble), a Mini-Korg, a Hammond B3 with a Leslie 145, and a Yamaha CP-70 electric grand.

== Personal life ==
Child has been married to Cat Gray, the chief musician on Let's Make a Deal, since 2004.

In 1990, she purchased the 1917 Los Angeles house of Vidah Bickford, a locally based guitarist and mandolinist. She enjoys collecting Citroens and antiques.

== Awards and nominations ==
Award	Year	Nominee(s)	Category	Result	Ref.
AMOA Jukebox Awards	1990	Herself	Rising Star	Nominated	
Juno Awards	1991	Herself	Most Promising Female Vocalist	Nominated	
Juno Awards	1991	Herself	Songwriter of the Year	Nominated	
Juno Awards	1991	Herself	Producer of the Year	Nominated	
Juno Awards	1991	"Don't Wanna Fall in Love"	Dance Recording of the Year	Won	
MTV Video Music Awards	1990	"Don't Wanna Fall in Love"	Best New Artist in a Video	Nominated	

== Discography ==
=== Albums ===
==== Studio albums ====
Year	Title	Label	Peak chart positions	
Year	Title	Label	US	US R&B
1989	Jane Child	Warner Bros.	49	40
1993	Here Not There	Warner Bros.	—	—
2002	Surge	Sugarwave	—	—
"—" denotes releases that did not chart.

==== Remix albums ====
Year	Title	Label
2002	Surge Remixed	Sugarwave

=== Singles ===
==== As lead artist ====
Year	Title	Album	Label	Peak chart positions					
Year	Title	Album	Label	CA	US	US Dance	US R&B	UK	AUS
1989	"Welcome to the Real World"	Jane Child	Warner Bros.	59	49	―	―	―	―
1990	"Don't Wanna Fall in Love"	Jane Child	Warner Bros.	4	2	11	6	22	97
1992	"Mona Lisa Smiles"	Here Not There	Warner Bros.	―	―	―	―	―	―
1993	"Here Not There"	Here Not There	Warner Bros.	―	―	―	―	―	―
1993	"Do Whatcha Do"	Here Not There	Warner Bros.	―	―	―	―	―	―
1993	"Perfect Love"	Here Not There	Warner Bros.	―	―	―	―	―	―
1994	"All I Do"	Here Not There	Warner Bros.	80	―	25	―	―	―
2001	"World Lullabye 2001"	Non-album single	Sugarwave	―	―	―	―	―	―
2001	"Almost Beautiful"	Surge	Sugarwave	―	―	―	―	―	―
2002	"Nice Day"	Surge	Sugarwave	―	―	―	―	―	―
"—" denotes releases that did not chart or were not released in that territory.

==== As featured artist ====
Year	Title	Label
1998	"Maybe Tomorrow" (Tomohiko Nishimura feat. Jane Child)	Fun House
