= Don't Wanna Fall in Love =

1990 single by Jane Child

Single by Jane Child

from the album Jane Child
- B-side: "World Lullabye"
- Released: January 19, 1990
- Length: 4:04
- Label: Warner Bros.
- Songwriter: Jane Child
- Producer: Jane Child

Jane Child singles chronology
"Welcome to the Real World" (1990)	"Don't Wanna Fall in Love" (1990)	"Welcome to the Real World" (reissue) (1990)

Music video
- "Don't Wanna Fall in Love" on YouTube

"Don't Wanna Fall in Love" is a song by Canadian singer-songwriter Jane Child. It was released in January 1990 as the second single from her first album, Jane Child. The single peaked at number four in Childs' native Canada and reached number two on the US Billboard Hot 100 for three consecutive weeks in April 1990. Worldwide, the song entered the top 20 in New Zealand and Sweden and peaked at number 22 on the UK Singles Chart. In April 1990, the single was certified gold by the Recording Industry Association of America (RIAA) for shipping 500,000 units.

== Writing and composition ==
Child wrote the song in Los Angeles, after moving from New York City. During the session she was playing bass with one hand and pads with the other while singing. While the groove was coming along, lyrics were following closely. She wrote the entire song in that session, except for the second verse later. The intention of the lyrics were not written as a happy love song, reflecting more so on the pleasure vs pain principle.

On the finished track, Child uses multi-tracking to sing all the parts, and to play every instrument (keyboards, synthesizer, synth bass, electric bass, drums, percussion, drum programming) except guitar, which is played by James Harrah.

== Music video ==
The music video was directed by cinematographer Derek M. Allen and shot in New York City at the request of Child, due to having written the song while living there. Shot in both black-and-white and color, the video shows Child walking through downtown Manhattan at night, alternating with scenes of the artist at work, singing into a studio microphone, laying down tracks on a Fairlight and mixing the results on a multitrack board. In several scenes, Child wears a Toronto Maple Leafs jersey, paying homage to her hometown.

== Track listings ==
All songs were written by Jane Child.

- Canadian and US cassette single
- US and Australian 7-inch single
- Japanese mini-CD single
1. "Don't Wanna Fall in Love" (LP version) – 4:04
2. "World Lullabye" (LP version) – 3:00
- Canadian and US 12-inch single
- Australian 12-inch and cassette single
1. "Don't Wanna Fall in Love" (Knife Feel Good mix) – 6:54
2. "Don't Wanna Fall in Love" (T.R. dub) – 5:03
3. "Don't Wanna Fall in Love" (AccaPercaPella) – 4:28
4. "World Lullabye" (LP version) – 3:00
5. "Don't Wanna Fall in Love" (7-inch remix version) – 4:00
6. "Don't Wanna Fall in Love" (New Jack Swing Club) – 5:31
7. "Don't Wanna Fall in Love" (T.R. Club-a-Dub) – 7:23
8. "Don't Wanna Fall in Love" (Bonus Beats) – 2:59
- US maxi-CD single
1. "Don't Wanna Fall in Love" (Knife Feel Good mix) – 6:54
2. "Don't Wanna Fall in Love" (T.R. dub) – 5:03
3. "Don't Wanna Fall in Love" (AccaPercaPella) – 4:28
4. "Don't Wanna Fall in Love" (7-inch remix version) – 4:00
5. "Don't Wanna Fall in Love" (New Jack Swing Club) – 5:31
6. "Don't Wanna Fall in Love" (T.R. Club-a-Dub) – 7:23
7. "Don't Wanna Fall in Love" (Bonus Beats) – 2:59
8. "World Lullabye" (LP version) – 3:00
- UK 7-inch and cassette single
- European 7-inch single
1. "Don't Wanna Fall in Love" (remix/edit) – 4:20
2. "Don't Wanna Fall in Love" (New Jack Club Swing) – 3:00
- UK 12-inch and CD single
1. "Don't Wanna Fall in Love" (New Jack Club Swing)
2. "Don't Wanna Fall in Love" (Knife Feel Good mix)
3. "Don't Wanna Fall in Love" (T.R. Club-a-Dub) – 7:23
- UK 12-inch posterpack single
- European 12-inch and CD single
1. "Don't Wanna Fall in Love" (12-inch remix) – 7:50
2. "Don't Wanna Fall in Love" (Dub It) – 5:06
3. "World Lullabye" – 3:01
- Japanese mini-album
1. "Don't Wanna Fall in Love" (Knife Feel Good mix)
2. "Don't Wanna Fall in Love" (T.R. dub)
3. "Don't Wanna Fall in Love" (AccaPercaPella)
4. "World Lullabye"
5. "Don't Wanna Fall in Love" (7-inch remix version)
6. "Don't Wanna Fall in Love" (New Jack Swing Club)
7. "Don't Wanna Fall in Love" (T.R. Club-a-Dub)
8. "Don't Wanna Fall in Love" (Bonus Beats)
9. "Welcome to the Real World" (The Real dance mix)
10. "Hey Mr. Jones"

== Charts ==
=== Weekly charts ===
Chart (1990–1991)	Peak position
Australia (ARIA)	97
Canada Top Singles (RPM)	4
Canada Adult Contemporary (RPM)	3
Canada Dance/Urban (RPM)	7
Europe (Eurochart Hot 100)	57
Ireland (IRMA)	26
Netherlands (Dutch Top 40 Tipparade)	12
Netherlands (Single Top 100)	52
New Zealand (Recorded Music NZ)	12
Sweden (Sverigetopplistan)	16
UK Singles (Official Charts)	22
US Billboard Hot 100	2
US Dance Club Songs (Billboard)	11
US Dance Singles Sales (Billboard)	5
US Hot R&B/Hip-Hop Songs (Billboard)	6
US Cash Box Top 100	2

=== Year-end charts ===
Chart (1990)	Position
Canada Top Singles (RPM)	49
Canada Adult Contemporary (RPM)	42
Sweden (Topplistan)	79
US Billboard Hot 100	29
US Cash Box Top 100	27

== Certifications ==
Region	Certification	Certified units/sales
United States (RIAA)	Gold	500,000^{^}
^{^} Shipments figures based on certification alone.

== Release history ==
Region	Date	Format(s)	Label(s)	Ref.
United States	January 19, 1990	7-inch vinyl; 12-inch vinyl; CD; cassette	Warner Bros.	
Australia	April 2, 1990	7-inch vinyl; cassette	Warner Bros.	
Japan	April 10, 1990	Mini-CD	Warner Bros.	
United Kingdom	April 30, 1990	7-inch vinyl; 12-inch vinyl; CD; cassette	Warner Bros.	
Australia	May 14, 1990	12-inch vinyl; cassette	Warner Bros.	
Australia	May 21, 1990	CD	Warner Bros.	
Japan	July 25, 1990	CD mini-album	Warner Bros.	

== See also ==
- List of 1990s one-hit wonders in the United States
