= Tyler Collins (singer) =

American R&B singer and actress (born 1965)

- Born: October 29, 1965 (age 60)
- Origin: Harlem, New York
- Genres: R&B, pop, adult contemporary
- Occupations: Singer, songwriter
- Instrument: Vocals
- Years active: 1987–present
- Labels: RCA Records; Warner Bros. Records

Tyler Collins (born October 29, 1965) is an American R&B singer and actress. Her song "Girls Nite Out" was a hit in 1990.

== Biography ==
Collins was born in Harlem, New York and raised in Detroit, Michigan. Collins began taking lessons in dance and theatre, and performing with the children's theatre group Willow Opera Workshop in Los Angeles, California.

Her professional music career began singing lead for an R&B group called The Boys Next Door. The group signed with Jermaine Jackson's label, Work Records, which later folded. Tyler eventually signed with RCA Records and released her debut album Girls Nite Out. She co-wrote the lead single "Whatcha Gonna Do" which peaked at #8 on the Billboard R&B chart. The music video for "Whatcha Gonna Do" was directed by Michael Bay and edited by Scott C. Wilson. The 1990 follow-up single "Girls Nite Out" also topped out at #8 on the Billboard's R&B charts, as well as #6 on its Pop charts.

Collins appeared on singer Tevin Campbell's debut T.E.V.I.N. on the song "Lil' Brother". She also appeared in the music video for the single "Goodbye".

Collins' songwriting came to the forefront for her second album Tyler, which was a decidedly more pop-oriented effort than Girls Nite Out. The set featured the singles "It Doesn't Matter" (co-written by Siedah Garrett) and "Just Make Me The One." Tyler has also written songs for Celine Dion, Shanice, and Jeffrey Osborne.

She also took part in the group recording Freedom (Theme From Panther) in 1995 featuring scores of young female R&B artists including Aaliyah, En Vogue, TLC, and others. Also in 1995, Tyler Collins recorded Never Alone (Eeyore's Lullaby) for the Winnie the Pooh tribute album. Take My Hand: Songs from the Hundred Acre Wood; it reached #48 on the Billboard Hot 100 for two weeks.

Her work with Prince lead to a solo recording contract at Warner Bros. Records. Though a full-length release never materialized, the deal did yield Collins' recording of the Top 20 Adult Contemporary song Thanks to You, produced by Clif Magness, the theme song to the Paramount Pictures' film Andre. A music video for the song is included at the end of the movie.

Apart from her singing career, Collins has also appeared in several television shows and motion pictures. She played the role of Tina in the 1991 film A Rage in Harlem, starring Gregory Hines and Forest Whitaker. She also starred in another film entitled Why Colors? and played her highest-profile role as Cinderella on a first-season episode of The Fresh Prince of Bel-Air. Collins was previously married to Bobby Smith Jr., screenwriter for the urban drama Jason's Lyric.

She currently resides in Los Angeles with her daughter.

== Discography ==
=== Albums ===
- Girls Nite Out (RCA, 1989) - Billboard R&B #22, Pop #85
- Tyler (RCA, 1992)

=== Singles ===
Year	Single	Peak chart positions				Album
Year	Single	US	US R&B	US Dan	CAN	Album
1989	"Whatcha Gonna Do"	—	8	—	—	Girls Nite Out
1990	"Girls Nite Out"	6	8	33	65	Girls Nite Out
1990	"Second Chance"	53	30	—	—	Girls Nite Out
1992	"Just Make Me the One"	—	52	—	—	Tyler
1992	"It Doesn't Matter"	88	93	—	—	Tyler
1992	"Thanks to You (Andre (Soundtrack))"	79	96	—	—	
1995	"Never Alone (Eeyore's Lullaby)"	48	—	—	—	Take My Hand: Songs from the 100 Acre Wood
"—" denotes a recording that did not chart or was not released in that territory.
