= Sweet Sensation (group) =

American girl group

- Sweet Sensation in 1990 (L–R): Sheila Vega, Betty "Dee" LeBron, and Margie Fernandez

Background information
- Origin: The Bronx, New York City, U.S.
- Genres: Pop; dance; freestyle
- Works: Sweet Sensation discography
- Years active: 1986–1993, 2007–2008; 2015–2021
- Labels: Next Plateau; Atco; Atlantic
- Past members: Betty "Dee" LeBron; Margie Fernandez; Mari Fernandez; Sheila Vega

Sweet Sensation was a freestyle-dance music girl group from The Bronx, New York City. The group was originally composed of Betty "Dee" LeBron and sisters Margie and Mari Fernandez. Sheila Vega replaced Mari in 1988. The group was formed in 1986 and released albums until 1992. Their song "If Wishes Came True" is their biggest hit, topping the Billboard Hot 100 list for a week in 1990.

== History ==
=== 1985–1988: Formation and Take It While It's Hot ===
Sweet Sensation was originally formed in 1985. A suggestion by Margie Fernandez led Betty Lebron to meet with David Sanchez, who was co-managing a group called Sly Fox with Cherrie Shepherd. One afternoon, David came by to meet Betty at Margie's home in Manhattan with a boombox. He recorded Betty singing a capella and passed this recording on to Shepherd. A few weeks later, on March 15, 1985, Margie and Betty had a meeting at Intergalactic Studios with Shepherd. Coincidentally, the act recording in the studio that day was a rap group called The Boogie Boys. One of the members of the group, Joseph "Romeo J.D." Malloy, would later become one of Sweet Sensation's main songwriters, penning several songs on their debut album, Take It While It's Hot.

Romeo's first song after meeting Margie and Betty was a demo called "Could It Be", which was recorded in Romeo's home studio by Betty. It was re-recorded at Unique Recording in New York City with Ted Currier of Platinum Vibe Productions as producer. It was at this time that a new chorus was added, and the song was re-titled "Hooked on You." Once the song was finally completed, a girl group was formed. Margie and her sister Mari joined Betty in the group. Sweet Sensation was signed to a production deal with Platinum Vibe Productions, and recording started on their first album, with Betty Lebron on lead vocals. Using "Hooked on You" as an introduction, the trio was signed to Next Plateau Records. "Hooked on You" was released on the Next Plateau label, along with their second single, "Victim of Love (Goodbye Baby)." In 1987, they were picked up by Atco, and their debut album, Take It While It's Hot, was released. The album peaked at #63 on the Billboard pop albums chart and spawned five singles: "Hooked on You" (#23), "Victim of Love (Goodbye Baby)," "Take It While It's Hot," "Never Let You Go" (which reached #1 on the U.S. Dance chart), and "Sincerely Yours" (#14). "Hooked on You" was then remixed and re-released, reaching #23.

=== 1988: Mari's departure, new member and Love Child ===
In late 1988, Mari left the group and was replaced by Sheila Vega. The artwork of their debut album, a photograph of the trio, was updated to reflect this change. The original album cover featured Betty, Margie, and Mari, but in the 1989 re-pressing of their album, new member Sheila Vega replaced Mari on the cover. The vocals on the album weren't re-recorded after the personnel change, however.

In 1990, their second album, Love Child, was released, containing what would turn out to be their biggest hit, the ballad "If Wishes Came True," which reached Number One on the Billboard Hot 100.

=== 1991–1993: Sheila and Margie's departures, new members and disbandment ===
In 1991, a remix album was released, Time to Jam (The Remix Album), which turned out to be their last. That year, Margie and Sheila left the group. Auditions were held to find new members to complete the gigs that the previous members and Betty had been booked for. Belle Ritter, Jeanette "Jenae" Colón, and a girl named Mya were chosen, making them a quartet. They continued performing together until 1993, when Betty LeBron embarked on a solo career, and the group disbanded.

=== 2005–2021: Reunions, lineup changes ===
In 2004, Sweet Sensation was ranked #391 in the Rock on the Net web site's Top 500 Pop Artists of the Past 25 Years. In 2005, the dance single "My Body Tu Cuerpo," credited as Dynamix Presents Sweet Sensation, was released on Kult Records featuring Betty LeBron on lead vocals (billed as Betty Dee), and produced by Eddie Cumana and Beppe Savoni of Dynamix.

== Members ==
=== Former members ===
- Betty "Dee" LeBron (1985–1993, 2007–2008, 2018–2021)
- Margie Fernandez (1985–1991, 2015–2017)
- Mari Fernandez (1985–1988, 2015–2017)
- Sheila Vega (1988–1991, 2007–2008, 2015–2017)

=== Touring members ===
- Mya (1991)
- Belle Ritter (1991–1993, 2018–2021)
- Jeanette "Jenae" Colón (1991–1993, 2007–2008, 2018–2021)

== Discography ==
=== Albums ===
List of albums, with selected chart positions
Title	Album details	Peak chart positions	
Title	Album details	US	AUS
Take It While It's Hot	Released: 1988; Label: Atco/Atlantic Records	63	—
Love Child	Released: 1990; Label: Atco/Atlantic Records	78	142
Time to Jam (The Remix Album)	Released: 1991; Label: Atco/Atlantic Records		—

=== Singles ===
Year	Single	Peak positions				Albums
Year	Single	US	Hot Dance/Club Play	Hot Dance Singles Sales	AUS	Albums
1986	"Hooked on You"	64	—	—	—	Take It While It's Hot
1987	"Victim of Love"	—	44	—	—	Take It While It's Hot
1988	"Take It While It's Hot"	57	14	7	—	Take It While It's Hot
1988	"Never Let You Go"	58	1	1	—	Take It While It's Hot
1989	"Sincerely Yours" (featuring Romeo J.D.)	14	30	—	—	Take It While It's Hot
1989	"Hooked on You" (Remix)	23	—	—	—	Take It While It's Hot
1990	"Love Child"	13	15	6	—	Love Child
1990	"If Wishes Came True"	1	—	—	68	Love Child
1990	"Each and Every Time"	59	—	—	—	Love Child
1991	"One Good Man"	—	—	—	—	Love Child
1992	"I Surrender" (Berrios Remix)	—	—	—	—	Love Child
2005	"My Body, Tu Cuerpo"	—	—	—	—	Non-album single

== See also ==
- List of number-one hits (United States)
- List of artists who reached number one on the Hot 100 (U.S.)
- List of number-one dance hits (United States)
- List of artists who reached number one on the U.S. Dance chart
