= Girls Nite Out (Tyler Collins song) =

1990 single by Tyler Collins

Single by Tyler Collins

from the album Girls Nite Out
- Released: February 5, 1990
- Recorded: 1989
- Genre: R&B
- Length: 4:37
- Label: RCA
- Songwriter: Darryl Ross
- Producer: Sheri Byers

Tyler Collins singles chronology
"Whatcha Gonna Do" (1989)	"Girls Nite Out" (1990)	"Second Chance" (1990)

"Girls Nite Out" is a song performed by American contemporary R&B singer Tyler Collins, issued as the second single from her debut studio album of the same name. The song was her only hit on the Billboard Hot 100, peaking at number six on the chart in 1990.

== Track listing ==
"Girls Nite Out" (Maxi Promo CD) [6-Track Remix Single]

1.) Girls Nite Out (Radio Mix)
2.) Girls Nite Out (Remix Edit)
3.) Girls Nite Out (T.C. In Effect)
4.) Girls Nite Out (Soul IV Seoul Bite)
5.) Girls Nite Out (Condo Mix)
6.) Girls Nite Out (Full Force House Mix)

== Chart positions ==
Chart (1990–1991)	Peak position
Australia (ARIA Charts)	133
US Billboard Hot 100	6
US Dance Club Songs (Billboard)	33
US Hot R&B/Hip-Hop Songs (Billboard)	8
