= Antoinette Roberson =

American songwriter

- Born: Houston, Texas, U.S.
- Education: Berklee College of Music (BFA); The New School (BFA, Vocal Performance); Texas Southern University (MA, PhD)
- Occupations: Songwriter, record producer, vocalist
- Known for: Co-writing "What's It Gonna Be?!" and "My Body"

Antoinette Roberson is an American songwriter, record producer, and vocalist known for her work in R&B and hip-hop during the late 1990s and early 2000s. She co-wrote the Grammy-nominated single "What's It Gonna Be?!" by Busta Rhymes featuring Janet Jackson (1999) and the platinum-certified single "My Body" by the R&B supergroup LSG (1997), which reached number one on the Billboard Hot R&B/Hip-Hop chart for seven weeks.

== Early life and education ==
Roberson was born and raised in Houston, Texas. She attended the High School for the Performing and Visual Arts in Houston before receiving a full scholarship to Berklee College of Music in Boston, where her classmates included Lalah Hathaway, Paula Cole, Quincy Jones III, and jazz trumpeter Roy Hargrove. She graduated with a Bachelor of Fine Arts in Vocal Performance from The New School in New York City.

Roberson later earned a master's degree and doctorate (PhD) in Educational Administration and Foundations from Texas Southern University, where she currently serves as an adjunct professor in the College of Education.

== Career ==
=== Songwriting and production ===
Roberson established herself as a prominent songwriter and producer in the late 1990s, frequently collaborating with producer Darrell "Delite" Allamby. In 1997, she co-wrote "My Body" for the R&B supergroup LSG, composed of Gerald Levert, Keith Sweat, and Johnny Gill. The song reached number one on the Billboard Hot R&B/Hip-Hop Singles & Tracks chart, where it remained for seven weeks, and was certified platinum by the RIAA.

In 1999, Roberson co-wrote "What's It Gonna Be?!" with Busta Rhymes and Darrell Allamby for Rhymes' album E.L.E. (Extinction Level Event): The Final World Front. The single, featuring Janet Jackson, peaked at number three on the Billboard Hot 100 and received a Grammy Award nomination for Best Rap Performance by a Duo or Group at the 42nd Annual Grammy Awards in 2000.

Other notable songwriting credits include "If You (Lovin' Me)" by Silk, which reached number one on the R&B charts and remained there for seven weeks. She also co-wrote "Taking Everything" by Gerald Levert featuring her own vocals, which peaked at number three on Billboard and became the number one video on BET.

Additional credits include work with 702, Will Downing, and contributions to the soundtrack of Maya Angelou's directorial debut film Down in the Delta, for which she co-wrote, produced, and vocal arranged "We Belong Together" featuring members of Kirk Franklin's God's Property.

=== Performance work ===
As a vocalist, Roberson recorded the dance single "The Lover That You Are" with the group Pulse, which reached number one on the Billboard Dance Charts in 1996 on Jellybean Benitez's Jellybean Recordings label. She has performed with artists including Cher, Diana Ross, Michael Jackson, D'Angelo, Maxwell, Earth, Wind & Fire, Luther Vandross, and Busta Rhymes.

== Selected discography ==
=== As songwriter ===
Title	Year	Artist	Album
"My Body"	1997	LSG	Levert.Sweat.Gill
"The Way That You Feel"	1997	Simone Hines	Simone Hines
"What's It Gonna Be?!" (featuring Janet Jackson)	1998	Busta Rhymes	Extinction Level Event: The Final World Front
"Thinkin' Bout It"	1998	Gerald Levert	Love & Consequences
"Whatcha Gone Do?"	1998	Link	Sex Down
"Sex Down"	1998	Link	Sex Down
"911-0024"	1998	Link	Sex Down
"Don't Runaway"	1998	Link	Sex Down
"Tonight"	1999	Silk	Tonight
"Let's Make Love"	1999	Silk	Tonight
"If You"	1999	Silk	Tonight
"If You (2000 Watts Remix)"	1999	Silk	Tonight
"Seven"	1999	702	702
"Callin' Me"	2000	Gerald Levert	G
"Bounce"	2000	Take 5	Against All Odds
"If I Tell You Yes"	2000	F.A.T.E.	For All That's Endured
"Welcome 2 the Love Session (Interlude)"	2001	Silk	Love Session
"Love Session"	2001	Silk	Love Session
"Treated Like a Lady"	2001	Silk	Love Session
"I'm Sorry"	2001	Silk	Love Session
"Sleeping In My Bed" (featuring Snoop Dogg)	2002	Darius Rucker	Back to Then

=== As performer ===
Title	Year	Artist	Album
"The Lover That You Are" (feat. Antoinette Roberson)	1996	Pulse	The Lover That You Are
"Shadows Of The Past" (feat. Antoinette Roberson)	1996	Pulse	The Lover That You Are
"Won't Give Up My Music" (feat. Antoinette Roberson)	1996	Pulse	The Lover That You Are
"Taking Everything" (feat. Antoinette Roberson)	1997	Gerald Levert	Love & Consequences
"Everyday" (feat. Antoinette Roberson)	1998	Hussein Fatal	In the Line of Fire
"We Belong Together" (with Antoinette Roberson)	1998	Tony Thompson	Down in the Delta (Soundtrack)

=== As background vocalist ===
Title	Year	Artist	Album
"I Believe I Love You"	1994	Crystal Waters	Storyteller
"Something Goin' On (In Your Soul)"	1994	Todd Terry	Ready for a New Day
"Taxi Taxi"	1998	Cher	Believe
"Lucky Girl"	1998	Gloria Estefan	Gloria!
"It's About That Money"	1999	Too Short	Can't Stay Away

== Awards and nominations ==
Year	Work	Award	Result	Ref
2000	ASCAP Rhythm & Soul Awards	Award-Winning R&B/Hip-Hop Songs (If You Lovin' Me)	Won	
2000	ASCAP Rhythm & Soul Awards	Award-Winning R&B/Hip-Hop Songs (What's It Gonna Be?!)	Won	
2000	ASCAP Rhythm & Soul Awards	Award-Winning Rap Songs (What's It Gonna Be?!)	Won	
