= Rush Hour 2 (soundtrack) =

Def Jam's Rush Hour 2 Soundtrack

Soundtrack album by various artists
- Released: July 31, 2001
- Recorded: 2000–01
- Genres: Hip hop; R&B
- Length: 66:46
- Labels: Def Jam; UMG Soundtracks
- Producers: Teddy Riley; Bloodshy; Carvin Haggins; CMT; Casino Joe; Darryl Swann; DJ KO; Dre & Vidal; E-A-Ski; Focus...; Fredro; Gerald Levert; Jazze Pha; Keith Pelzer; Macy Gray; Pajam; Rodney Jerkins; Rockwilder; Swizz Beatz; The Neptunes; Warryn Campbell

Singles from Rush Hour 2 Soundtrack
- 1. "Area Codes" Released: July 3, 2001; 2. "Party and Bullshit" Released: 2002; 3. "How It's Gonna Be" Released: 2002

Professional ratings
Review scores
Source	Rating
AllMusic	2.5/5 stars
RapReviews	5/10

Def Jam's Rush Hour 2 Soundtrack is the soundtrack to Brett Ratner's 2001 action-comedy film Rush Hour 2. It was released on July 31, 2001, through Def Jam Recordings/UMG Soundtracks. The album peaked at number eleven on both the Billboard 200 and the Top R&B/Hip-Hop Albums charts and reached number one on the Top Soundtracks chart. The release was supported by three singles: "Area Codes", "Party and Bullshit", and "How It's Gonna Be". The album was certified Gold by the Recording Industry Association of Japan in July 2001 and by the Recording Industry Association of America on September 5, 2001.

== Track listing ==
No.	Title	Writer(s)	Producer(s)	Length
1.	"Area Codes" (performed by Ludacris and Nate Dogg)	Christopher Bridges; Nathaniel Hale; Phalon Alexander; Billy Nichols	Jazze Pha	3:42
2.	"Mine, Mine, Mine" (performed by Montell Jordan)	Montell Jordan; Jason Weaver; Bernard Edwards Jr.	Focus...	3:40
3.	"Party & Bullshit" (performed by Method Man and Teddy Riley)	Clifford Smith; Theodore Riley; Claude "Quo" Forbes	Teddy Riley	3:10
4.	"No" (performed by Kandice Love)	Rodney Jerkins; LaShawn Daniels; Fred Jerkins III; Nora S. Payne	Darkchild; Lashawn "Big Shiz" Daniels (voc.)	4:23
5.	"He's Back" (performed by Keith Murray)	Keith Murray; Dana Stinson	Rockwilder	3:48
6.	"Love Again" (performed by Jazz and Jill Scott)	Andre Harris; Vidal Davis; Marsha Ambrosius; Natalie Stewart	Dre & Vidal	4:11
7.	"Keep It Real (Tell Me)" (performed by Musiq Soulchild and Redman)	Talib Johnson; Carvin Haggins; Keith Pelzer	Carvin Haggins; Keith "Keshon" Pelzer	4:34
8.	"Crazy Girl" (performed by LL Cool J and Mashonda)	James Todd Smith; Kaseem Dean	Swizz Beatz	3:57
9.	"How It's Gonna Be" (performed by LovHer)	Warryn Campbell; Harold Lilly	Warryn Campbell	3:39
10.	"Paper Trippin'" (performed by WC and Nate Dogg)	William Calhoun; Hale; Shon Adams; Mark Ogleton	E-A-Ski; CMT	4:03
11.	"You Make Me Laugh" (performed by Christina Milian)	Christina Milian; Christian Karlsson; Fredrik Ödesjö	Bloodshy; Fredro (co.)	3:37
12.	"Mercedes Benz" (performed by Say Yes)	Gerald Levert; Joe Little III	Gerald Levert; Casino Joe	3:50
13.	"Blow My Whistle" (performed by Hikaru Utada and Foxy Brown)	Hikaru Utada; Inga Marchand; Chad Hugo; Pharrell Williams	The Neptunes	4:06
14.	"Figadoh" (performed by Benzino, Scarface and Snoop Dogg)	Raymond Scott; Calvin Broadus; Riley	Teddy Riley	4:03
15.	"I'm Sorry" (performed by 3rd Storee)	James Moss; Paul Allen	J. Moss; Paul "PDA" Allen; Pajam	5:05
16.	"Brollic" (performed by FT)	Winston Morris; Kareem Denis; Marvin Gaye	DJ KO	2:29
17.	"The World Is Yours" (performed by Macy Gray and Slick Rick)	Richard Martin Lloyd Walters	Darryl Swann; Macy Gray; ?uestlove (add.); Kiilu Beckwith (add.)	4:12
Total length:				1:06:46

Asian bonus tracks
No.	Title	Length
18.	"Get Ready" (performed by Perry and YG Family)	3:48
19.	"I Wanna Be Like Jacky Chan" (performed by Urban Xchange)	3:43

== Charts ==
Chart (2001)	Peak position
French Albums (SNEP)	149
New Zealand Albums (RMNZ)	22
US Billboard 200	11
US Top R&B/Hip-Hop Albums (Billboard)	11

== Certifications ==
Region	Certification	Certified units/sales
Japan (RIAJ)	Gold	100,000
United Kingdom (BPI)	Gold	100,000^{^}
United States (RIAA)	Gold	500,000^{^}
^{^} Shipments figures based on certification alone.
