= BK Got Music Summer Soul Tour =

2002 concert tour

- Tour by Luther Vandross, Gerald Levert, Angie Stone and Michelle Williams
- Poster for the August 25, 2002 show at the Allstate Arena
- Location: North America
- Associated album: Luther Vandross; The G Spot; Mahogany Soul; Heart to Yours
- Start date: August 15, 2002
- End date: September 22, 2002
- Legs: 1
- No. of shows: 19
Luther Vandross tour chronology
Take You Out Tour (2001–2002)	BK Got Music Summer Soul Tour (2002)	N/A
Michelle Williams tour chronology
Destiny's Child World Tour (2002)	BK Got Music Summer Soul Tour (2002)	Destiny Fulfilled... and Lovin' It (2005)

BK Got Music Summer Soul Tour is a concert tour by American recording artists Luther Vandross, Gerald Levert, Angie Stone and Michelle Williams. Sponsored by Burger King and produced by Clear Channel Entertainment and Haymon Entertainment, the tour commenced August 15, 2002 at the FleetBoston Pavilion, with strong ticket sales, playing a 19-date run of amphitheater shows. Ticket prices ranged from $25 to $100.

The tour was anchored by Vandross, who had released his J Records debut Luther Vandross the year before. Tour promoter Al Hymon explained "We were looking for compatible acts in the young adult vein, which brought us to Gerald Levert and Angie Stone [...] The idea was to offer a lot of entertainment for the dollar, and each of these acts is capable of doing a full set. In the case of Luther and Levert, they've headlined many, many shows. This is a show capable of crossing all color lines and demos."

It was Williams’ first tour without her Destiny’s Child bandmates, in support of her solo debut Heart to Yours, which reached number-one on the US Top Gospel Albums chart that year. Stone's second album, Mahogany Soul, had debuted at No. 22 on the US Billboard 200 in November 2001 and Levert was due to release his sixth studio album The G Spot on September 24, 2002. Keke Wyatt performed in place of Williams at the Verizon Wireless Amphitheatre, Virginia Beach on August 17, 2002.

== Shows ==
List of 2002 concerts, showing date, city, country, venue, opening act, attendance and gross revenue
Date	City	Country	Venue	Attendance	Revenue
August 15, 2002	Boston	United States	FleetBoston Pavilion	—N/a	—N/a
August 17, 2002	Virginia Beach	United States	Verizon Wireless Amphitheatre	13,206 / 20,000	$372,804
August 18, 2002	Atlanta	United States	Chastain Park Amphitheatre	—N/a	—N/a
August 23, 2002	Cincinnati	United States	Riverbend Music Center	—N/a	—N/a
August 24, 2002	Clarkston	United States	DTE Energy Music Theatre	—N/a	—N/a
August 25, 2002	Rosemont	United States	Allstate Arena	6,879 / 14,998	$413,222
August 30, 2002	Raleigh	United States	Alltel Pavilion	—N/a	—N/a
August 31, 2002	Charlotte	United States	Verizon Wireless Amphitheatre	—N/a	—N/a
September 1, 2002	Washington, D.C.	United States	MCI Center	8,023 / 10,000	$605,737
September 6, 2002	Wantagh	United States	Jones Beach Theater	—N/a	—N/a
September 7, 2002	Holmdel Township	United States	PNC Bank Arts Center	—N/a	—N/a
September 8, 2002	Philadelphia	United States	First Union Center	10,904 / 15,169	$581,856
September 13, 2002	Dallas	United States	Smirnoff Music Centre	—N/a	—N/a
September 14, 2002	Kansas City	United States	Starlight Theatre	7,668 / 7,794	$335,307
September 15, 2002	St. Louis	United States	Savvis Center	—N/a	—N/a
September 17, 2002	Cleveland	United States	Nautica Stage	—N/a	—N/a
September 20, 2002	Las Vegas	United States	Mandalay Bay Events Center	8,287 / 8,566	$466,345
September 21, 2002	Irvine	United States	Verizon Wireless Amphitheatre	7,946 / 10,063	$406,213
September 22, 2002	Concord	United States	Concord Pavilion	12,245 / 12,500	$573,480
