= Tiffany Haddish filmography =

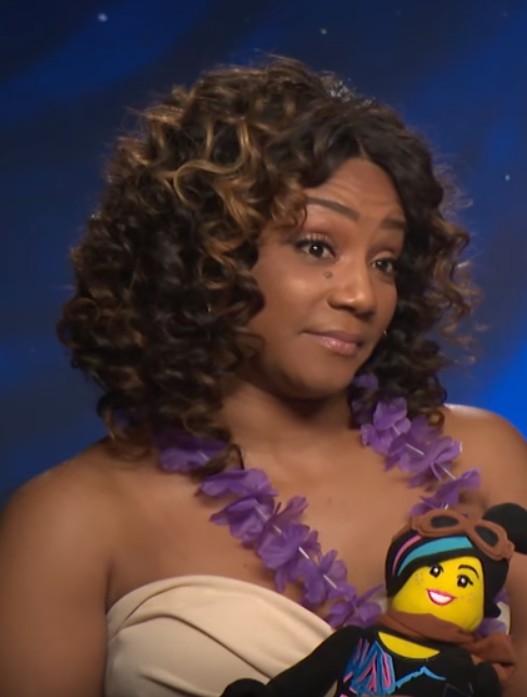
Tiffany Haddish in 2019

Tiffany Haddish is an American stand-up comedian, actress, and author. Her breakthrough came in 2017, when she garnered critical acclaim for her performance in the comedy film Girls Trip. Haddish has won a Primetime Emmy Award for her work as a host on a Saturday Night Live episode, and she has published a memoir, The Last Black Unicorn. She starred in the TBS series The Last O.G., and executive produced and voiced Tuca in the Netflix/Adult Swim animated series Tuca & Bertie. In 2021, she won a Grammy Award for Best Comedy Album for her comedy album Black Mitzvah, making her the second African-American woman to win this prize after Whoopi Goldberg in 1986.

== Film ==
Key
†	Denotes films that have not yet been released

Year	Title	Role	Notes
2005	The Urban Demographic	Janice Green	
2008	Meet the Spartans	Urban Girl	
2009	Janky Promoters	Michelle	
2009	After Hours Comedy, Vol 1.	Herself	Video
2010	Wax On, F*ck Off	Prostitute	Short
2011	Driving by Braille	Drum Major	
2012	Honk If You're an LA Douchebag	Les Holmes	Short
2012	What My Husband Doesn't Know	Falana	Video
2012	Boosters	Debra	
2013	Christmas Wedding	Aurora	
2014	4Play	Comedian	
2014	Patterns of Attraction	Sandra Lewis	
2014	Wishes	Jeanie	
2014	School Dance	Trina	
2015	Stunted	Teri	Short
2016	Keanu	Trina "Hi-C" Parker	
2017	Mad Families	Keko	
2017	Girls Trip	Dina	
2018	All Between Us	Mishawn	
2018	Uncle Drew	Jess	
2018	The Oath	Kai Albert Button-Montana	
2018	Night School	Carrie Carter	
2018	Nobody's Fool	Tanya	
2018	Taylor Swift: Reputation Stadium Tour	Herself	Documentary
2019	The Lego Movie 2: The Second Part	Queen Watevra Wa'Nabi (voice)	
2019	The Secret Life of Pets 2	Daisy (voice)	
2019	The Angry Birds Movie 2	Debbie (voice)	
2019	The Kitchen	Ruby O'Carroll	
2019	Between Two Ferns: The Movie	Herself	
2020	Like a Boss	Mia Carter	
2020	Phineas and Ferb the Movie: Candace Against the Universe	"The Sound Someone Makes When They Explode From The Waist Up" (voice)	
2020	The SpongeBob Movie: Sponge on the Run	Tiffany Hadock (voice)	
2021	On the Count of Three	Natasha	
2021	Bad Trip	Trina Malone	
2021	Here Today	Emma Payge	
2021	The Card Counter	La Linda	
2022	The Unbearable Weight of Massive Talent	Vivian Etten	
2022	Easter Sunday	Vanessa	
2023	Landscape with Invisible Hand	Beth Campbell	
2023	Haunted Mansion	Harriet	
2023	Back on the Strip	Verna	
2024	Bad Boys: Ride or Die	Tabitha	
2025	Haunted Heist	TBA	
2026	The Girl in the River	Erica Graysmith	
TBA	Girls Trip 2	Dina	

== Television ==
Year	Title	Role	Notes
2005	Pimp My Ride	Herself	Episode: "Rashae's Ford Taurus"
2005	That's So Raven	Charlotte	Episode: "When in Dome"
2006	Bill Bellamy's Who's Got Jokes?	Herself	Episode: "Warm It Up in LA"
2006	My Name Is Earl	Robin	Episode: "The Bounty Hunter"
2006	It's Always Sunny in Philadelphia	Stripper #3	Episode: "Charlie Gets Crippled"
2006	The Underground	Herself	Episode: "1.3"
2007	Nick Cannon Presents: Short Circuitz	Herself	Episode: "1.1"
2007	Just Jordan	Diamond	Episode: "Krumpshakers"
2008	Racing for Time	Denise	TV movie
2008	Da Network	Odette	TV movie
2008	The McCaingels	The Bride	Episode: "1.1"
2008	Def Comedy Jam	Herself	Episode: "8.3"
2008	Baisden After Dark	Herself	Episode: "Sex 101: Do Men Know What They're Doing in the Bedroom?"
2008	Reality Bites Back	Herself/Contestant	5 episodes
2009	Comics Unleashed	Herself	1 episode
2009	In the Motherhood	Teddy	Episode: "It Takes a Village Idiot"
2009	Secret Girlfriend	Jessica's Co-Worker	Episode: "You and Your Ex Call It Quits"
2009	Black to the Future	Herself	Episode: "Hour 4: The 00s"
2009	The Tony Rock Project	Herself	Episode #1.8
2010	Undateable	Herself	Documentary miniseries
2010	Last Comic Standing	Last Comic Standing	Episode #7.2
2010	Naked But Funny	Herself	TV movie
2011	Who Wants to Date a Comedian?	Herself	Episode: "Tiffany Haddish"
2011–12	Chelsea Lately	Herself/Round Table Guest	4 episodes
2012	The Game	Shawnda	Episode: "The Black People Episode"
2012	Russell Simmons Presents: The Ruckus	Herself	Episode: "Wil Sylvince/Tiffany Haddish/Earthquake"
2012	Snoop Dogg Presents: The Bad Girls of Comedy	Herself	TV special
2013–14	Real Husbands of Hollywood	Tiffany	7 episodes
2014	New Girl	Leslie	Episode: "Exes"
2014	TripTank	Delsyia (voice)	3 episodes
2014	Funniest Wins	Herself/Contestant	5 episodes
2014–15	If Loving You Is Wrong	Jackie	Main cast (14 episodes)
2015	Faux Show	Felicity	TV movie
2015–17	The Carmichael Show	Nekeisha Williams-Carmichael	Main cast (32 episodes)
2016–17	Legends of Chamberlain Heights	Cindy (voice)	Main cast (18 episodes)
2017	Tiffany Haddish: She Ready! From the Hood to Hollywood	Herself	Stand-up special
2017	Face Value	Herself (co-host)	12 episodes
2017	Saturday Night Live	Herself (host)	Episode: "Tiffany Haddish/Taylor Swift"
2018	Drunk History	Herself	Episode: "Heroines"
2018	Funny You Should Ask	Herself	5 episodes
2018	Sesame Street	Dr. Birdwhistle	Episode: "When You're a Vet"
2018–20	The Last O.G.	Shannon "Shay" Birkeland	Main cast (30 episodes)
2019	SpongeBob SquarePants	Herself	Episode: "SpongeBob's Big Birthday Blowout"
2019	Kevin Hart's Guide to Black History	Adult Mae Jemison	Netflix special
2019	Bob's Burgers	Patricia (voice)	Episode: "Roamin' Bob-iday"
2019	Double Dare	Herself	Contestant
2019	What Just Happened??! with Fred Savage	Herself	Episode: "Parents"
2019	Crank Yankers	Herself (voice)	2 episodes
2019	Tiffany Haddish: Black Mitzvah	Herself	Netflix stand-up special"
2019	Live in Front of a Studio Audience	Willona Woods	Episode: "All in the Family and Good Times"
2019, 2021	Tiffany Haddish Presents: They Ready	Herself	Netflix comedy series
2019–22	Tuca & Bertie	Tuca (voice)	Main cast (30 episodes)
2019–21	Kids Say the Darndest Things	Herself (host)	28 episodes
2020	Self Made	Lelia Walker	Main cast (4 episodes)
2020	Saving OurLives: BET COVID-19 Relief Effort	Herself	Television special
2020	Feeding America Comedy Festival	Herself	Television special
2020	Home Movie: The Princess Bride	Princess Buttercup	Episode: "Chapter One: As You Wish"
2020	Nickelodeon's Unfiltered	Herself	Episode: "Hot Dog Dance Party!"
2020	Lady Parts	Herself	Episode: "Tiffany Haddish Gets Her Uterus Tilted"
2020	Mariah Carey's Magical Christmas Special	Herself	Television special
2020	Yearly Departed	Herself	Television special
2020–25	Solar Opposites	A.I.S.H.A. (voice)	Supporting cast (37 episodes)
2020–present	The Freak Brothers	Kitty (voice)	Main cast (18 episodes)
2021	The Price Is Right	Herself	Episode: "With Tiffany Haddish"
2021	Friday Night Vibes	Herself (host)	19 episodes
2021–22	Karma's World	Lady K (voice)	Main cast (40 episodes)
2022–23	The Afterparty	Detective Danner	Main cast (18 episodes)
2022	Phat Tuesdays: The Era of Hip Hop Comedy	Herself	Documentary series
2022	Crank Yankers	Tammy Jones (voice)	Episode: "Tiffany Haddish, Desus & Mero and Jimmy Kimmel"
2022, 2025	The Proud Family: Louder and Prouder	Ms. Hill (voice)	2 episodes
2023	The Jason Lee Show	Herself	Season 1, episode 20
2023	Whose Line is it Anyway?	Herself	Episode: "Tiffany Haddish"
2023	A Very Demi Holiday Special	Herself	Television special
2025	It's Florida, Man	Officer Bobbi	Episode: "Cuckoo Girl"
2025	Tiffany Haddish Goes Off	Herself	Peacock Series
2026	The Masked Singer	Herself/Le Who Who	Contestant
2026	Password	Herself	Episode: "Jimmy Fallon & Tiffany Haddish"
2026	The Simpsons	Tiffany (voice)	Episode: "Treehouse of Horror XXXVII"

== Web ==
Year	Title	Role	Notes
2026	Backyard Sports: The Animated Special	Kiesha Phillips (voice)	Animated special

== Music videos ==
Year	Title	Artist(s)	Album	Role	Ref.
2017	"Moonlight"	Jay-Z	4:44	Phoebe Buffay	
2018	"Girls Like You" (Original version) (featuring Cardi B)	Maroon 5	Red Pill Blues	Herself	
2018	"Girls Like You" (Volume 2) (featuring Cardi B)	Maroon 5	Red Pill Blues	Herself	
2018	"Girls Like You" (Vertical Video) (featuring Cardi B)	Maroon 5	Red Pill Blues	Herself	
2018	"What's Going On"	Todrick Hall	Forbidden	Herself	
2018	"Ring-a-Ling"	Todrick Hall	Forbidden	Herself	
2018	"Pettiness"	Todrick Hall	Forbidden	Herself	
2018	"Apple Pie"	Todrick Hall	Forbidden	Herself	
2018	"Nice for What"	Drake	Scorpion	Herself	
2018	"Goals"	Yung Nova	Carpe Diem	Herself	
2019	"Soul of a Woman"	Johnny Gill	Game Changer II	Herself	
2019	"Dripeesha" (featuring Tiffany Haddish)	Todrick Hall	Haus Party, Pt. 2	Herself	
2020	"Come and Get Your Baby Daddy"	Tiffany Haddish		Herself	
2020	"You Do You" (featuring Tiffany Haddish)	Jason Mraz	Look for the Good	Herself	

== Video games ==
Year	Title	Role
2009	Terminator Salvation	Resistance Soldier
