= Sex Down =

Studio album by Link
- Released: June 23, 1998
- Recorded: 1997–1998
- Studio: New England Powerstation (Waterford, Connecticut); Audio Dallas (Garland, Texas); Powerhouse Studios (Newark, New Jersey); The Studio (Philadelphia, Pennsylvania); Master Sound Studios (Virginia Beach, Virginia)
- Genre: R&B
- Length: 64:51
- Label: Millenium 2000, Relativity
- Producer: Darrell "Delite" Allamby, Kenneth "Kenny Flav" Dickerson, Kenny Whitehead & Errol "Jam" Johnson, Timothy "Tyme" Riley, Percy Williams, Steve Morales

Professional ratings
Review scores
Source	Rating
Allmusic	3/5 stars

Sex Down is the debut studio album by R&B singer Link, released on June 23, 1998 through Relativity Records.

Link co-wrote with Darrell Delite Allamby, and Antionette Roberson the number one billboard hit "My Body" for R&B supergroup LSG, Link soon after signed a recording contract to Darrell Delite Allamby's production company, Millineum 2000 distributed by Relativity Records. Link began to work on his debut album, with Darrell Delite Allamby who served as the album's Executive Producer and main Co-writer alongside Antionette Roberson. While the album's lead single "Whatcha Gone Do? became a top 40 hit on the Billboard Hot 100, peaking at No. 23, the album itself failed to make a significant impact on the charts, only making it to 187 on the Billboard 200 and 46 on the R&B charts. Link did not release another studio album until 2008's independent effort Creepin'.

== Track listing ==
- Credits adapted from liner notes and Allmusic.
1. "Club Scene at Gigi's" - 1:47
2. "D.A.N.C.E. with Me" (Darrell Allamby, Lincoln Browder, Victor Jones) - 4:14
3. "Whatcha Gone Do?" (Darrell Allamby, Lincoln Browder, Antoinette Roberson) - 4:19
4. "Gimmie Some" (Darrell Allamby, Lincoln Browder) - 4:33
5. "I Really Wanna Sex Your Body" (Kenneth Dickerson, Darrell Allamby, Lincoln Browder) - 4:56
6. "Sex Down" (Darrell Allamby, Lincoln Browder, Antoinette Roberson) - 5:12
7. "Sex-Lude" - 3:12
8. "911-0024" (Darrell Allamby, Lincoln Browder, Antoinette Roberson, Timothy Riley, Percy Williams) - 4:24
9. "Link's Messages" - 4:02
10. "All Night Freakin'" (Darrell Allamby, Lincoln Browder, Kenneth Dickerson, Ronald Isley, Rudolph Isley, O'Kelly Isley, Marvin Isley, Ernie Isley, Chris Jasper) - 5:16
11. "Spill" (Kenneth L. Whitehead, John C. Whitehead, Errol Johnson) - 5:19
12. "One of a Kind Love" (Darrell Allamby, Lincoln Browder) - 4:24
13. "I Don't Wanna See" (Darrell Allamby, Lincoln Browder) - 5:30
14. "Don't Runaway" (Prelude) - 0:37
15. "Don't Runaway" (Darrell Allamby, Lincoln Browder, Antoinette Roberson, Timothy Riley, Percy Williams) - 4:46
16. "Thank You" - 2:20

== Personnel ==
Credits adapted from liner notes.

- Keyboards and Drum Programming: Darrell "Delite" Allamby, Kenneth "Kenny Flav" Dickerson, Timothy "Tyme" Riley, Percy Williams, Steve "Million Dollar Man" Morales
- Vocoder: Darrell "Delite" Allamby
- Guitar: Victor "Lundon" Jones, Kenny Whitehead
- Background vocals, Lincoln "Link" Browder, Darrell "Delite" Allamby, Brandi "Chyna" Simpson, Nneka Morton, Antoinette Roberson, Andrea Wallace, The Whitehead Brothers, Errol "Jam" Johnson
- Recording engineers: Ben Arrindell, Larry Gold, Darrell "Delite" Allamby, Paul Osborn, Kenny Whitehead
- Mixing: Ben Arrindell, Darrell "Delite" Allamby, Kenneth "Kenny Flav" Dickerson, Kenny Whitehead, Steve Morales
- Mastering: Herb Powers
- Executive producer: Darrell "Delite" Allamby, Jonathan C. Kinloch
- Photography: Michael Benabib
- Art direction: David Bett
- Design: Chiu Liu

== Charts ==
Chart (1998)	Peak position
Billboard 200	187
Billboard Top R&B/Hip-Hop	46
Billboard Top Heatseekers	8
