= G (Gerald Levert album) =

Studio album by Gerald Levert
- Released: March 7, 2000
- Length: 64:40
- Label: EastWest
- Producer: Darrell "Delite" Allamby; Craig T. Cooper; Kenneth "Kenny Flav" Dickerson; Gerald Levert; Joe Little III, Edwin "Tony" Nicholas; Kelly Price

Gerald Levert chronology
Love & Consequences (1998)	G (2000)	Gerald's World (2001)

Professional ratings
Review scores
Source	Rating
AllMusic	3/5 stars
USA Today	3/4 stars

G is the fourth studio album by the American singer Gerald Levert. It was originally scheduled to be released via EastWest Records on September 21, 1999, under the title Same 'Ol G, but was pushed back to March 7, 2000. The album peaked at number two on the US Top R&B/Hip-Hop Albums and at number 8 on the Billboard 200.

== Track listing ==
G – Standard edition
No.	Title	Writer(s)	Producer(s)	Length
1.	"Application (I'm Lookin 4 A New Love)"	Darrell Allamby; Antonio Mobley	Allamby	4:08
2.	"Callin' Me"	Gerald Levert; Allamby; Kenneth "Kenny Flav" Dickerson; Lincoln Browder; Antoinette Roberson	Allamby; Dickerson	5:37
3.	"Nothin' to Somethin'"	Levert; Allamby; Dickerson	Allamby; Dickerson	4:55
4.	"Strings, Strings"	Levert; Edwin "Tony" Nicholas	Levert; Nicholas	4:55
5.	"It Hurts Too Much to Say" (featuring Kelly Price)	Levert; Price	Price	5:34
6.	"Mr. Too Damn Good"	Levert; Joe Little III	Levert; Little	4:32
7.	"She Done Been"	Levert; Little	Levert; Little	4:06
8.	"Heart Don't"	Levert; Nicholas	Levert; Nicholas	5:01
9.	"Don't Take It Away"	Levert; Nicholas	Levert; Nicholas	4:52
10.	"Second Time Around"	Levert; Nicholas; Serena Winn	Levert; Nicholas	4:45
11.	"Misery"	Levert; Nicholas	Levert; Nicholas	5:37
12.	"Baby U Are"	Levert; Craig T. Cooper	Levert; Cooper	5:19
13.	"These"	Levert; Nicholas	Levert; Nicholas	5:12

== Charts ==
=== Weekly charts ===
Chart (2000)	Peak position
US Billboard 200	8
US Top R&B/Hip-Hop Albums (Billboard)	2

=== Year-end charts ===
Chart (2000)	Position
US Billboard 200	122
US Top R&B/Hip-Hop Albums (Billboard)	24

== Certifications ==
Region	Certification	Certified units/sales
United States (RIAA)	Gold	500,000^{^}
^{^} Shipments figures based on certification alone.
