= So Alone (song) =

Single by Men at Large

from the album Men at Large
- Released: November 19, 1992
- Genre: R&B
- Length: 7:27 (album version); 5:27 (single edit)
- Label: EastWest
- Songwriters: Gerald Levert; Edwin Nicholas; Joe Little III; Edward Lee Banks

Men at Large singles chronology
"Would You Like to Dance (With Me)" (1993)	"So Alone" (1992)	"Um Um Good" (1993)

"So Alone" is a song recorded by American contemporary R&B group Men at Large and issued as the fourth single from the group's eponymous debut album (1992). Released in November 1992 by EastWest Records, the song peaked at No. 31 and 37 on the US Billboard Hot 100 and Cash Box Top 100 charts in 1993. It also was the group's only song to appear on these charts; as well as the group's only pop hit.

== Charts ==
Chart (1993)	Peak position
US Billboard Hot 100	31
US Hot R&B/Hip-Hop Singles & Tracks (Billboard)	5
US Rhythmic Top 40 (Billboard)	14
US Cash Box Top 100	37
