= LSG2 =

Studio album by LSG
- Released: July 28, 2003
- Genre: R&B
- Length: 47:37
- Label: Elektra
- Producers: Darrell "Delite" Allamby; Thomas Booth; Mike City; Dee Dee Jenkins; Gerald Levert; Sean Levert Jr.; Joe Little; Edwin "Tony" Nicholas; Tyrone "T.O" Oliver; Steve Russell; Marc "Dipp" Silverburg

LSG chronology
Levert.Sweat.Gill (1997)	LSG2 (2003)

Singles from LSG2
- 1. "Just Friends" Released: April 22, 2003; 2. "Shakedown" Released: June 17, 2003; 3. "Yesterday" Released: September 16, 2003

LSG2 is the second and final studio album by R&B group LSG. It was released on July 28, 2003, by Elektra Records.

== Critical reception ==
Professional ratings
Review scores
Source	Rating
AllMusic	3/5 stars
New York Post	3/4 stars
USA Today	2.5/4 stars

David Jeffries from AllMusic found that "the sexier than expected LSG2 presents the singers as swashbuckling lords of the bedroom and shows little interest in crossing over to the pop world's more chaste framework. It's a good thing they allow themselves the freedom, since the album's highlights are the more racy numbers." Jeffries highlights the track, "Yesterday", with its "over the top emotion and meandering way bring[ing] reminders of Prince at his most lonely and lustful and giv[ing] the album some needed substance. Elsewhere the songwriting lags, but the slick production and LSG's passionate vocals make this seduction hard to resist." Dan Aquilante of the New York Post praised LSG2 for the complementary vocals of Johnny Gill, Keith Sweat and Gerald Levert, highlighting its sultry soul and polished R&B production.

== Commercial performance ==
LSG2 opened and peaked at number 6 on the US Billboard 200 and number 3 on the US Top R&B/Hip-Hop Albums, with first week sales of 66,000 copies. It became the group’s second top-ten release on both charts, though it represented a significant decline from their previous album Levert.Sweat.Gill (1997), which had debuted with roughly double the first-week sales.

== Track listing ==
LSG2 track listing
No.	Title	Writer(s)	Producer(s)	Length
1.	"Just Friends" (featuring Loon)	Darrell "Delite" Allamby; Lincoln "Link" Browder	Allamby	4:24
2.	"Wide Open"	Sean Levert Jr.; Andy Gibson; Kandi Burruss; James Austin	Gerald Levert; Sean Levert Jr.	3:37
3.	"Shake Down"	G. Levert; Joe Little Jr.; James Smith; S. Levert Jr.	G. Levert; Little	4:49
4.	"Fa-Free"	Steve Russell	Russell	5:08
5.	"Yesterday"	G. Levert; Edwin "Tony" Nicholas	G. Levert; Nicholas	4:16
6.	"Play with Fire"	Mike City	City	3:42
7.	"What About Me"	Tyrone "T.O" Oliver; "Big Keys" Thomas Boot; Dee Dee Jenkins	Oliver; Booth; Jenkins	3:52
8.	"All I Want"	Jason Coffey; George Coffey; Marc "Dipp" Silverburg; Vincent Higgins	Silverburg	4:48
9.	"Lesson Learned"	G. Levert	G. Levert	4:12
10.	"Can't Get Over You"	G. Levert; Nicholas	G. Levert; Nicholas	4:19
11.	"Cry and Make Love"	G. Levert; Allamby	G. Levert; Allamby	4:30
Total length:				47:37

Samples

- "Just Friends" contains portions of "Friends" as written by Lawrence Smith and Jalil Hutchins.

== Personnel ==
Adapted from AllMusic.

=== LSG ===
- Gerald Levert – vocals, background vocals, keyboards
- Keith Sweat – vocals, vocal ad-libs
- Johnny Gill – vocals

=== Additional personnel ===
- Randy Bowland – guitar
- Edwin "Tony" Nicholas – keyboards
- Darrell "Delite" Allamby – vocal ad-libs
- Craig T. Cooper – vocoder
- Lincoln Browder, James Freebarin-Smith, Joe Little, Sherena Wynn – background vocals
- Loon – rap

=== Production ===
- Darrell "Delite" Allamby, Mike City, Deirdre Jenkins, Gerald Levert, Edwin "Tony" Nicholas, Joe Little – producers
- LSG, Merlin Bobb, Sylvia Rhone – executive producers

== Charts ==
Weekly chart performance for LSG2
Chart (2003)	Peak position
French Albums (SNEP)	127
US Billboard 200	6
US Top R&B/Hip-Hop Albums (Billboard)	3
