= Sean Levert =

American R&B singer (1968–2008)

- Levert in 1995

Background information
- Born: Sean Edward Levert; September 28, 1968; Cleveland, Ohio, U.S.
- Died: March 30, 2008 (aged 39) Cleveland, Ohio, U.S.
- Genres: R&B; soul; new jack swing
- Occupations: Singer–songwriter; actor
- Instrument: Vocals
- Years active: 1983–2008
- Labels: Atlantic; EastWest; Elektra
- Formerly of: Gerald Levert; LeVert; LSG; Johnny Gill; The Rude Boys; The O'Jays; Men At Large

Sean Edward Levert (September 28, 1968 – March 30, 2008) was an American singer-songwriter and actor. Levert was best known as a member of the R&B vocal group LeVert. Levert was the son of O'Jays lead singer Eddie Levert and younger brother of singer Gerald Levert.

== Life and career ==
Sean Levert was born in Cleveland, Ohio, and was the son of Eddie Levert, the lead singer of the O'Jays. He formed the trio LeVert with older brother Gerald Levert and childhood friend Marc Gordon; together they scored several smash hits on the U.S. R&B charts in the 1980s and early 1990s. In 1995, Sean launched a solo career with the album The Other Side on Atlantic Records, which peaked at number 22 on the US Billboard R&B chart and number 146 on the Billboard 200. The album yielded the charting singles "Put Your Body Where Your Mouth Is" (U.S. R&B number 40) and "Same One" (U.S. R&B number 57) that same year. Sean and Gerald Levert appeared in the film New Jack City (1991); Sean also played a part in the direct-to-video Dope Case Pending (2000).

== Personal life ==
Levert was married to Angela Lowe, and had six children: Shareaun Woods, Keith Potts, Sean Levert Jr., Breoni Levert, Brandon Levert, and Chad Levert. His father is the first cousin twice removed, of Caris LeVert who plays for the Detroit Pistons of the NBA . In 2008, he was sentenced to 22 months in prison for failing to pay child support for three of his children, then aged 11, 15, and 17.

== Health and death ==
Levert became ill while incarcerated in the Cuyahoga County Correctional Facility, prior to his transfer to a state prison, reporting high blood pressure and hallucinations; he died six days after being admitted to the jail, on March 30. The Cuyahoga County coroner ruled in May that his death was caused by complications from sarcoidosis. The official Coroner's report also noted contributing factors of high blood pressure, heart disease, diabetes, and withdrawal from Xanax; he was 39 years old. In 2010, his widow was awarded $4,000,000 as the result of a lawsuit filed against Cuyahoga County.

== Discography ==
=== Studio albums ===
- The Other Side (1995)
