= Stroke of Genius =

Studio album by Gerald Levert
- Released: October 21, 2003
- Length: 71:16
- Label: Elektra
- Producer: Jasper da Fatso; Gerald Levert; Edwin "Tony" Nicholas

Gerald Levert chronology
The G Spot (2002)	Stroke of Genius (2003)	Do I Speak for the World (2004)

Stroke of Genius is the seventh studio album by American R&B singer Gerald Levert. It was released by Elektra Records on October 21, 2003, in the United States.

== Critical reception ==
Professional ratings
Review scores
Source	Rating
Allmusic	2/5 stars
Vibe	3.5/5 stars

In his review for AllMusic, David Jeffries found that Stroke of Genius "is one of the best arguments yet that Gerald LeVert needs to slow down his release schedule and trust someone else in the producer's chair for once. After 1998's Love & Consequences, Levert fell into a rut, releasing one underwhelming album after another. His voice is fine and he still does the convincing pillow talk, but like his last few releases, the material isn't there. Too often he turns to R. Kelly-styled strip-club music way beyond his reach, with the embarrassing "Knock, Knock, Knock" being the worst offender." Laura Checkoway from Vibe wrote that LeVert has "always been most comfortable making smooth love music. And when he keeps it slow and steady, the outcome is indeed a small stroke of brilliance."

== Track listing ==
No.	Title	Writer(s)	Producer(s)	Length
1.	"1st Stroke (Intro)"	Gerald Levert; Edwin "Tony" Nicholas	Levert; Nicholas	0:28
2.	"Knock Knock Knock"	Jasper Cameron	Jasper da Fatso	3:08
3.	"Long Hot Summer"	Levert; Nicholas	Levert; Nicholas	3:40
4.	"Awesome"	Levert; Nicholas	Levert; Nicholas	4:39
5.	"Stroke of Genius"	Levert; Nicholas; Barry White	Levert; Nicholas	4:36
6.	"(They Long to Be) Close to You" (featuring Tamia)	Burt Bacharach; Hal David	Levert; Nicholas	5:21
7.	"I Got a Girl"	Levert; Nicholas	Levert; Nicholas	4:03
8.	"U Got That Love (Call It a Night)"	Levert; Nicholas	Levert; Nicholas	4:30
9.	"Wear It Out"	Levert; Nicholas	Levert; Nicholas	4:30
10.	"Good Morning"	Levert; Nicholas	Levert; Nicholas	2:48
11.	"Keep It Warm"	Levert; Nicholas	Levert; Nicholas	3:43
12.	"Didn't We"	Levert; Nicholas	Levert; Nicholas	4:35
13.	"To My Grave"	Levert; Nicholas	Levert; Nicholas	3:46
14.	"Let It Be"	Levert; Nicholas	Levert; Nicholas	3:33
15.	"The Visit (Interlude)"	Levert	Levert	0:21
16.	"Eyes and Ears" (featuring Eddie Levert & Sean Levert)	Levert; Nicholas	Levert; Nicholas	4:19
17.	"Rest of Your Life"	Levert; Nicholas	Levert; Nicholas	3:53
18.	"You Got That Love Again"	Levert; Nicholas	Levert; Nicholas	4:04
19.	"Won't Get Up"	Levert	Levert	4:25
20.	"Last Stroke (Outro)"	Levert	Levert	0:49

Sample credits

- "Stroke of Genius" contains elements of "I'm Gonna Love You Just a Little More Baby" as written and performed by Barry White.

== Charts ==
=== Weekly charts ===
Chart (2003)	Peak position
US Billboard 200	6
US Top R&B/Hip-Hop Albums (Billboard)	1

=== Year-end charts ===
Chart (2003)	Position
US Top R&B/Hip-Hop Albums (Billboard)	100
Chart (2004)	Position
US Top R&B/Hip-Hop Albums (Billboard)	71
