= List of Billboard number-one R&B albums of 1992 =

These are the Billboard magazine R&B albums that reached number one on the chart in 1992.

== Chart history ==
Issue date	Album	Artist
January 4	Dangerous	Michael Jackson
January 11	Dangerous	Michael Jackson
January 18	Dangerous	Michael Jackson
January 25	Dangerous	Michael Jackson
February 1	Keep It Comin'	Keith Sweat
February 8	Keep It Comin'	Keith Sweat
February 15	Keep It Comin'	Keith Sweat
February 22	Dangerous	Michael Jackson
February 29	Dangerous	Michael Jackson
March 7	Dangerous	Michael Jackson
March 14	Dangerous	Michael Jackson
March 21	Dangerous	Michael Jackson
March 28	Dangerous	Michael Jackson
April 4	Dangerous	Michael Jackson
April 11	Dangerous	Michael Jackson
April 18	Private Line	Gerald Levert
April 25	Private Line	Gerald Levert
May 2	The Comfort Zone	Vanessa Williams
May 9	Funky Divas	En Vogue
May 16	Funky Divas	En Vogue
May 23	Totally Krossed Out	Kris Kross
May 30	Totally Krossed Out	Kris Kross
June 6	Totally Krossed Out	Kris Kross
June 13	Totally Krossed Out	Kris Kross
June 20	Dead Serious	Das EFX
June 27	Dead Serious	Das EFX
July 4	Dead Serious	Das EFX
July 11	Dead Serious	Das EFX
July 18	Dead Serious	Das EFX
July 25	Totally Krossed Out	Kris Kross
August 1	Totally Krossed Out	Kris Kross
August 8	Boomerang	Soundtrack / Various artists
August 15	Boomerang	Soundtrack / Various artists
August 22	Boomerang	Soundtrack / Various artists
August 29	Boomerang	Soundtrack / Various artists
September 5	Boomerang	Soundtrack / Various artists
September 12	Boomerang	Soundtrack / Various artists
September 19	Boomerang	Soundtrack / Various artists
September 26	Boomerang	Soundtrack / Various artists
October 3	What's the 411?	Mary J. Blige
October 10	What's the 411?	Mary J. Blige
October 17	What's the 411?	Mary J. Blige
October 24	What's the 411?	Mary J. Blige
October 31	What's the 411?	Mary J. Blige
November 7	Bobby	Bobby Brown
November 14	What's the 411?	Mary J. Blige
November 21	Bobby	Bobby Brown
November 28	What's the 411?	Mary J. Blige
December 5	The Predator	Ice Cube
December 12	The Bodyguard	Soundtrack / Whitney Houston
December 19	The Bodyguard	Soundtrack / Whitney Houston
December 26	The Bodyguard	Soundtrack / Whitney Houston

== See also ==
- 1992 in music
- R&B number-one hits of 1992 (USA)
