= Men at Large (album) =

Studio album by Men at Large
- Released: 1992
- Recorded: 1991–1992
- Genre: R&B
- Label: East West

Men at Large chronology
Men at Large (1992)	One Size Fits All (1994)

Men at Large is the debut album by R&B group Men at Large, released by East West Records in 1992. It peaked at No. 122 on the Billboard 200.

== Critical reception ==
Professional ratings
Review scores
Source	Rating
AllMusic	3/5 stars

AllMusic noted that "Men at Large ballads are not typical '60s/'70s slowies; they're more like mini-dramas intended to evoke screams, not cool 'oohs' and 'ahhhs'."

== Track listing ==
1. "Where's Dave and Jason" (Skit Intro)
2. "Use Me" (version #1)
3. "You Me"
4. "Would You Like to Dance (With Me)"
5. "Um Um Good"
6. "Heartbeat"
7. "So Alone"
8. "Salty Dog"
9. "Stay the Night"
10. "Ain't It Grand"
11. "Use Me" (version #2)
12. "Menz at Larges" (Skit Outro)

== Credits ==
- Men At Large: David L. Tolliver, Jason L. Champion (rap, background vocals).
- Additional personnel: Michael Calhoun (guitar); Marc Gordon, Edwin Nicholas Robert Cunningham (keyboards, drums, programming, sequencing); Jim Salamone, Pete Tokar (programming, sequencing); Joe Little III (background vocals).
- Producers: Gerald Levert, Marc Gordon, Robert Cunningham, Edwin Nicholas.
- Recorded at Midtown Recording Studio, Cleveland, Ohio, and Digital Tekniques Studio, Philadelphia, Pennsylvania.
