= Do I Speak for the World =

Studio album by Gerald Levert
- Released: November 30, 2004
- Length: 61:30
- Label: Elektra
- Producer: Darrell "Delite" Allamby; Gordon Chambers; Mike City; Gerald Isaac; Gerald Levert; Edwin "Tony" Nicholas; Troy Taylor

Gerald Levert chronology
| Stroke of Genius (2003) | Do I Speak for the World (2004) | In My Songs (2007) |

Do I Speak for the World is the eighth studio album by American R&B singer Gerald Levert and his last to be released during his lifetime. It was released by Elektra Records on November 30, 2004 in the United States. The album marked his final studio album with the label.

== Critical reception ==
Professional ratings
Review scores
| Source | Rating |
|---|---|
| Allmusic | 3.5/5 stars |
| Blender | 2/5 stars |

AllMusic editor Rob Theakston called Do I Speak for the World "an enjoyable listen and a fine return to form." He felt that the album "is a nice return to form for the Levert frontman's glory years. Too often his releases have been plagued with inconsistency and pandering to whatever fashionable R&B formula is hip at the moment. And while there are moments of faltering and filler laced in at times and the lyrical content hasn't left its safe harbor, his performances haven't been this consistently solid since 1998's Love & Consequences." Blender critic Baz Dreisinger found that "ulike the ultra-smooth Casanovas of contemporary R&B, Levert has the guttural, full-bodied voice of a man, not a blinged-out playa. His beats here are basic, letting his vocal range do the work. As one track bleeds into another, though, you start craving some sounds of youth: snazzier beats, slicker hooks, guest vocals — anything to inject a little zest into the musical maturity."

== Track listing ==
| No. | Title | Writer(s) | Producer(s) | Length |
|---|---|---|---|---|
| 1. | "Intro"/"Speak for the World" | Gerald Levert; Darrell "Delite" Allamby; Edwin "Tony" Nicholas | Levert; Allamby; Nicholas | 6:17 |
| 2. | "Cornell West"/"Tavis Smiley Interlude" | Levert | Levert | 1:17 |
| 3. | "Crucify Me" | Allamby | Allamby | 4:52 |
| 4. | "Greater Later" | Levert; Nicholas; Dwayne Moore | Levert; Nicholas | 4:06 |
| 5. | "Show You How to Love (Interlude)" | Levert; Allamby | Levert; Allamby | 1:02 |
| 6. | "Lay You Down" | Levert; Nicholas | Levert; Nicholas | 4:33 |
| 7. | "Everyday" | Levert; Nicholas | Levert; Nicholas | 4:29 |
| 8. | "Better to Talk It Out" | Gordon Chambers; Troy Taylor | Chambers; Taylor | 4:30 |
| 9. | "It Was What It Was" | Levert; Nicholas | Levert; Nicholas | 4:32 |
| 10. | "Duty Calls" | Levert; Nicholas | Levert; Nicholas | 4:11 |
| 11. | "One Million Times" | Levert; Allamby | Levert; Allamby | 3:56 |
| 12. | "What Happened to the Lovin'" (featuring Eddie Levert, Trey Songz & The Levert Kids) | Chambers; Rick Williams; Taylor | Chambers; Taylor | 3:42 |
| 13. | "So What (If You Got a Baby)" | Gerald Isaac | Isaac | 4:19 |
| 14. | "Where Do We Go" | Michael Flowers | Mike City | 4:00 |
| 15. | "Click a Glass" | Levert; Nicholas | Levert; Nicholas | 4:58 |
| 16. | "Do I Speak for the World (Outro)" | Allamby | Allamby | 0:55 |

== Charts ==
=== Weekly charts ===
| Chart (2004) | Peak position |
|---|---|
| US Billboard 200 | 29 |
| US Top R&B/Hip-Hop Albums (Billboard) | 7 |

=== Year-end charts ===
| Chart (2005) | Position |
|---|---|
| US Top R&B/Hip-Hop Albums (Billboard) | 62 |
