= The Other Side (Sean Levert album) =

1995 studio album by Sean Levert

Studio album by Sean Levert
- Released: June 20, 1995
- Genre: R&B
- Length: 48:30
- Label: Atlantic
- Producer: Jermaine Dupri; Marc Gordon; Gerald Levert; Edwin "Tony" Nicholas; Manuel Seal

The Other Side is the only solo album by American R&B singer Sean Levert. It was released by Atlantic Records on June 20, 1995, in the United States. While Jermaine Dupri was recruited to work with the singer on the majority of the album, Levert also secured that his first album would showcase some "love-making music." Thus, he also worked with his LeVert bandmates, Marc Gordon and his brother Gerald Levert, as well as Edwin "Tony" Nicholas on several songs.

The album earned generally positive reviews from music critics and peaked at number 22 on the US Billboard Top R&B/Hip-Hop Albums and number 146 on the Billboard Hot 100. The Other Side yielded the charting singles "Put Your Body Where Your Mouth Is" and "Same One".

== Background ==
The Other Side marked Levert's solo debut. While Jermaine Dupri was recruited to work with the singer on the majority of the album, Levert also secured that his first album would showcase some "love-making music." Thus, he also worked with his LeVert bandmates, Marc Gordon and his brother Gerald Levert, and frequent collaborator Edwin "Tony" Nicholas on several songs.

== Critical reception ==
Professional ratings
Review scores
| Source | Rating |
|---|---|
| AllMusic | 3/5 stars |

Andrew Hamilton from AllMusic called the album "a satisfying debut" and wrote: "He sings in a pleasant, laid-back tenor/baritone. Only ten selections, but not a sister of the poor in the bunch [...] Top shelf productions by Gerald Levert and Jermaine Dupri makes The Other Side a keeper." Vibe editor Gordon Chambers found that The Other Side "delivers the churchy, baritone soul with which his last name has become synonymous — but with a younger, trendier [...] Levert is obviously trying to compete with the risque male soul that recently scored for R. Kelly as well as the father of them all, Barry White. Levert sounds most at home, though, on the sensua but not too overdone [songs]."

== Track listing ==
| No. | Title | Writer(s) | Producer(s) | Length |
|---|---|---|---|---|
| 1. | "I'm Ready" | Jermaine Dupri; Manuel Seal | Dupri; Seal^{[a]} | 5:01 |
| 2. | "Just Can't Get Enough" | Gerald Levert; Marc Gordon; Sean Levert; Bootsy Collins; Gary Shider; Gary Lee Cooper; George Clinton | G. Levert; Marc G. | 4:55 |
| 3. | "Same One" | Ashley Coombs; Edwin "Tony" Nicholas; G. Levert | Nicholas; G. Levert | 5:35 |
| 4. | "Put Your Body Where Your Mouth Is" | Nicholas; G. Levert | Nicholas; G. Levert | 4:58 |
| 5. | "Place to Be" | Dupri; Seal | Dupri; Seal^{[a]} | 3:42 |
| 6. | "I'm in a Freaky Mood" | Nicholas; G. Levert | Nicholas; G. Levert | 5:04 |
| 7. | "The Other Side" | Nicholas; G. Levert; S. Levert | Nicholas; G. Levert | 4:34 |
| 8. | "Just for the Fun of It" | Nicholas; G. Levert; S. Levert | Nicholas; G. Levert | 5:29 |
| 9. | "Tasty Love" | G. Levert; Gordon | G. Levert; Marc G. | 5:06 |
| 10. | "Only You" | Dupri; Seal; S. Levert | Dupri; Seal^{[a]} | 4:11 |

Notes

- ^{^a} denotes co-producer

Sample credits

- "Just Can't Get Enough" contains elements from "Munchies for Your Love" by Bootsy Collins.
- "Tasty Love" embodies portions of the composition "Computer Love" by Zapp.

== Charts ==
| Chart (1995) | Peak position |
|---|---|
| US Billboard 200 | 146 |
| US Top R&B/Hip-Hop Albums (Billboard) | 22 |

== Release history ==
List of release dates, showing region, formats, label, and reference
| Region | Date | Format | Label | Ref. |
|---|---|---|---|---|
| United States | June 20, 1995 | CD; cassette | Atlantic Records | |
