= Gerald's World =

Studio album by Gerald Levert
- Released: September 18, 2001
- Length: 74:29
- Label: Elektra
- Producer: Mike City; J. Dub; Casino Joe; Gerald Levert; Edwin "Tony" Nicholas; Warryn Campbell

Gerald Levert chronology
G (1999)	Gerald's World (2001)	The G Spot (2002)

Gerald's World is the fifth studio album by American R&B singer Gerald Levert. It was released by Elektra Records on September 18, 2001, in the United States.

== Critical reception ==
Professional ratings
Review scores
Source	Rating
AllMusic	2.5/5 stars
Blender	3/5 stars
USA Today	3/4 stars

In his review for AllMusic, David Jeffries called Gerald's World "another Gerald Levert album – nothing less, nothing more [...] On Gerald's World, he's as smooth and as sweet-talkin' as ever. But there's something automatic about it all, a sense of security with the persona and legend he's built over the years. LeVert still may have a bedroom voice, but more often than not here, he seems about ready to call it a night." Blender critic Will Bourne found that "Levert’s panty-dropping baritone is more than up to the fight. Imploring and, when that fails, outright begging the object of his affection to submit to his relentlessly polished soul charms, he’s clearly unwilling to take no for an answer. The old goat."

== Track listing ==
Gerald's World – Standard edition
No.	Title	Writer(s)	Producer(s)	Length
1.	"Soul Mate"	Michael Flowers	Mike City	4:12
2.	"DJ Played Our Song"	Gerald Levert; Joe Little III	Levert; Little	4:45
3.	"What Makes It Good to You (No Premature Lovin')"	Levert; Edwin "Tony" Nicholas	Levert; Nicholas	4:18
4.	"You're a Keeper"	Levert; Nicholas	Levert; Nicholas	4:28
5.	"#1"	Jeffrey Walker; Stephen Garrett	J. Dub	4:22
6.	"Smile for Me"	Levert; Little; Marlon Coles; J. Shawn Smith	Levert; Casino Joe	3:49
7.	"Can't Win"	Levert; Nicholas	Levert; Nicholas	5:17
8.	"Same Ol'"	Flowers	City	4:07
9.	"Just Us"	Levert; Little; Larry Marcus	Levert; Little	4:59
10.	"Got Love"	Levert	Levert	5:15
11.	"Make My Day" (featuring Joe Little III & Sean Levert)	Levert; Sean Levert; Little	Levert; Little	4:32
12.	"Made to Love Ya"	Eddie Berkeley; Harold Lilly	Warryn Campbell	4:33
13.	"What You Cryin' About"	Levert; Nicholas	Levert; Nicholas	4:30
15.	"Dream With No Love"	Levert; Andy Gibson	Levert	4:57

== Charts ==
=== Weekly charts ===
Chart (2001)	Peak position
US Billboard 200	6
US Top R&B/Hip-Hop Albums (Billboard)	2

=== Year-end charts ===
Chart (2001)	Position
US Top R&B/Hip-Hop Albums (Billboard)	83
