= Stroke of genius =

Stroke of genius may refer to:

- Epiphany (feeling), an experience of a sudden and striking realization
- Eureka effect, suddenly understanding a previously incomprehensible problem or concept
- Flash of genius, an obsolete doctrine in US patent law
  - Flash of Genius (film), a 2008 film about the legal doctrine
- Bobby Jones: Stroke of Genius, a 2004 biographical drama film about golfer Bobby Jones
- Stroke of Genius, an album by Gerald Levert
- "A Stroke of Genius", a mashup song by the Freelance Hellraiser
- "Stroke of Genius" (The Bold Type), a 2019 television episode
