= Private line (disambiguation) =

A private line is telephony service using dedicated circuits.

Private Line may also refer to:

- Private Line (band), a Finnish hard rock band
- Private Line (album), by Gerald Levert
  - "Private Line" (song), the debut single
