= Still Winning =

Studio album by Johnny Gill
- Released: October 11, 2011
- Length: 44:18
- Labels: Notifi; Fontana
- Producers: Bryan-Michael Cox; Johnny Gill; Patrick "GuitarBoy" Haynes; Sanchez Holmes; John Jackson; Jimmy Jam and Terry Lewis; Anthony Life; Kevin Ross; Ralph B. Stacy; Troy Taylor; Vincent "Invisible" Watson; James "Big Jim” Wright

Johnny Gill chronology
| 20th Century Masters (2003) | Still Winning (2011) | Game Changer (2014) |

Singles from Still Winning
- 1. "In the Mood" Released: May 31, 2011; 2. "It Would Be You" Released: 2012; 3. "Just the Way You Are" Released: 2012

Still Winning is the sixth studio album by American R&B singer Johnny Gill. It was released on October 11, 2011, through independent imprint Notifi Records. Gill's first album of solo material since 1996's Let's Get the Mood Right, it peaked at number 17 on the US Billboard 200 and number 4 on the Billboard R&B chart. Three singles were released from the album: "In the Mood" (which was originally written for TLC), "It Would Be You" and "Just the Way You Are". In addition to original songs, the album closes with a cover of the Paul McCartney and Wings song "My Love."

== Critical reception ==
Professional ratings
Review scores
| Source | Rating |
|---|---|
| About.com | 3.5/5 stars |
| AllMusic | 2/5 stars |

The album received mixed to negative reviews from critics. Andy Kellman of AllMusic rated it two stars out of five, stating that "not much [was] memorable" about the album and that Gill often sounded "distanced". Chris Rizik of SoulTracks stated that the album was inconsistent and had a "forgettable start", but went on to state that the album improved mid-disc and then concluded that the album was "mildly recommended" to consumers.

== Track listing ==
| No. | Title | Writer(s) | Producer(s) | Length |
|---|---|---|---|---|
| 1. | "Still Winning" | Derek Firdie; Johnny Gill; Sanchez Holmes; Mark Reasinger; Michael Snyder | Holmes | 3:59 |
| 2. | "Let's Stay Together" | Bryan-Michael Cox; Patrick "J. Que" Smith | Cox | 3:59 |
| 3. | "In the Mood" | Gill; Ralph Stacy; Dave Young | Stacy; Gill | 5:04 |
| 4. | "Just the Way You Are" | Johntá Austin; Troy Taylor; Vincent "Invincible" Watson | Watson | 3:43 |
| 5. | "Black Box" | Alvin Garrett; Romel Gibson; John Jackson | Jimmy Jam & Terry Lewis; Jackson | 4:04 |
| 6. | "Long, Long Time" (featuring Eddie Levert and Keith Sweat) | Cox; Kendrick Dean; Stephen Garrett | Cox | 4:25 |
| 7. | "2nd Place" | Kevin Ross | Ross | 4:05 |
| 8. | "Who Is He" | Dennis Bettis; Gill; Stacy | Stacy; Gill | 5:19 |
| 9. | "It Would Be You" | Patrick "Guitarboy" Hayes; Tremaine Neverson; Maurice Traylor; Troy Taylor | Hayes; Taylor | 4:08 |
| 10. | "My Love" | Paul McCartney; Linda McCartney | Jam; Lewis; James "Big Jim" Wright | 5:32 |
| Total length: | | | | 44:18 |

== Charts ==
| Chart (2011) | Peak position |
|---|---|
| US Billboard 200 | 17 |
| US Independent Albums (Billboard) | 3 |
| US Top R&B/Hip-Hop Albums (Billboard) | 4 |
