= Baby Hold On to Me =

1991 song by Gerald Levert and Edwin Nicholas

"Baby Hold On to Me" is a song written by American singer and songwriter Gerald Levert and Edwin Nicholas. It was released as an R&B single by Levert with his father, The O'Jays star Eddie Levert, in January 1992 from his debut album, Private Line (1991). The song spent one week at number one on the US Billboard R&B chart and was Gerald Levert's first Top 40 single as a solo artist, peaking at numbers 37 and 71 on the Billboard Hot 100 and Cash Box Top 100 charts.

== Charts ==
Chart (1992)	Peak position
Billboard Hot 100	37
Hot R&B (Billboard)	1
US Cash Box Top 100	71

== See also ==
- List of number-one R&B singles of 1992 (U.S.)
