= In My Songs =

Studio album by Gerald Levert
- Released: February 13, 2007
- Recorded: Midtown Multimedia Studio (Cleveland, Ohio); Studio 7303 (Houston, Texas)
- Length: 51:06
- Label: Atlantic
- Producers: Gerald Levert; Edwin "Tony" Nicholas; Travis Milner

Gerald Levert chronology
Do I Speak for the World (2004)	In My Songs (2007)	Something to Talk About (2007)

In My Songs is the ninth studio album and the first posthumous album by American singer Gerald Levert. It was released posthumously on February 13, 2007, on Atlantic Records. Levert reteamed with longtime collaborator Edwin "Tony" Nicholas to work on the entire album which was completed shortly before his death from an apparent accidental overdose in November 2006. In My Songs debuted and peaked at number two on the US Billboard 200, becoming his highest-charting effort, and won Levert his first Grammy Award in the Best Traditional R&B Performance for the title track at the 50th awards ceremony.

== Critical reception ==
Professional ratings
Review scores
Source	Rating
About.com	3.5/5 stars
AllMusic	4/5 stars
Entertainment Weekly	B+
Los Angeles Times	3/4 stars
PopMatters	7/10
USA Today	3/4 stars

AllMusic editor Andy Kellman wrote that the album "delivers almost exactly what any fan expects" with "something for every mood" and no guest appearances to get in the way, and noted that even the midtempo club tracks and stately testimonies "either match or beat the mostly just-fine ballads," concluding that while LeVert "never made an outright classic album," his body of work "amounts to a great legacy." Natalie Nichols from The Los Angeles Times found that In My Songs reaffirmed Levert's strength as an R&B auteur, blending a "charismatic" and "down-to-earth passion" with mature themes of love and relationships, and while sometimes lacking subtlety, it felt "refreshingly real." PopMatters editor Mike Joseph wrote that In My Songs was a "solid, dependable album" of "grown folks music" that stayed true to his established sound, and while it didn’t reinvent his style and sometimes repeated familiar ideas, it served as a "fitting finale" to his career.

Steve Jones of USA Today praised In My Songs as a fitting farewell, highlighting the singer's distinctive voice, dedication to vintage soul, and lasting legacy following his death. He described the album as a collection of "new gems" that honored Levert’s 20-year career. Writing for Entertainment Weekly, Simon Vozick-Levinson felt that the album would have been a "solid addition" to Levert's catalog regardless of his death, highlighting his "satin-smooth voice" on slow jams and tasteful uptempo tracks, and calling it "a more fitting memorial" to his too-short life. Washington Post's Sarah Godfrey wrote that In My Songs showcased Levert's "ability to connect contemporary and old-school soul," blending "classic R&B vocals with modern touches," and highlighted his "witty, vulnerable lyricism" on the title track, while "updated production keeps the album current," making it "a fitting final statement" of his era-straddling artistry. New York Times critic Kelefa Sanneh wrote that In My Songs was a "modest but well-made album" that reflected his "old-fashioned" and reliable style, and while some songs blended together, at its best it portrayed relationships honestly, making it a "fitting bookend" to his career.

== Commercial performance ==
In My Songs opened and peaked at number two on the US Billboard 200 with 165,000, Levert's highest charting album ever and his best sales week since Nielsen SoundScan began tracking data in 1991. The album also reached the top of Billboard's Top R&B/Hip-Hop Albums chart.

== Track listing ==
In My Songs track listing
No.	Title	Writer(s)	Producer(s)	Length
1.	"In My Songs"	Gerald Levert; Eddie Levert; Edwin "Tony" Nicholas	Levert; Nicholas	5:08
2.	"I Don't Get Down Like That"	G. Levert; E. Levert; Nicholas	Levert; Nicholas	3:51
3.	"DJ Don't"	G. Levert; E. Levert; Nicholas	Levert; Nicholas; Travis Milner^{[A]}	3:28
4.	"Wanna Get Up with You"	G. Levert; E. Levert; Nicholas	Levert; Nicholas	3:29
5.	"Fall Back"	G. Levert; E. Levert; Nicholas	Levert; Nicholas	3:40
6.	"Deep As It Goes"	G. Levert; E. Levert; Nicholas	Levert; Nicholas	5:04
7.	"Hang in There"	G. Levert; E. Levert; Nicholas	Levert; Nicholas	4:50
8.	"Sweeter"	G. Levert; E. Levert; Nicholas	Levert; Nicholas	4:41
9.	"What Cha Think About That"	G. Levert; E. Levert; Nicholas	Levert; Nicholas	3:48
10.	"To My Head"	G. Levert; E. Levert; Nicholas	Levert; Nicholas	3:58
11.	"M'Lady"	G. Levert; E. Levert; Nicholas; Kenneth Gamble; Leon Huff	Levert; Nicholas	3:49
12.	"Is This the Way to Heaven"	G. Levert; E. Levert; Nicholas	Levert; Nicholas	4:51
Total length:				51:06

Notes

- ^{^[A]} denotes additional producer

Sample credits

- "DJ Don't" contains a replayed sample from "Ain't No Fun (If the Homies Can't Have None)" as performed by Snoop Dogg, cNate Dogg, Warren G, and Kurupt.
- "Hang in There" contains re-sung lyrics from "Cry for You", as performed by Jodeci.
- "M'Lady" contains samples from the recording "Let's Spend Some Time" as performed by Slave.

== Personnel ==
- Gerald Levert – lead vocals (tracks 1, 3, 7, 10–11), background vocals (1, 3, 7, 10–11), keyboards (10)
- Daris Atkins – additional guitar (track 7)
- Ronald Bookman – recording engineer (track 2)
- Randy Bowland – guitar (track 8)
- Tony Detwiley – guitar (track 1)
- Joe Little III – background vocals (track 10)
- Glen Marchese – audio mixing (tracks 3, 5, 7, 9)
- Manny Marroquin – audio mixing (track 10)
- Marq Moody – recording engineer (track 12, assistant on track 2)
- Edwin "Tony" Nicholas – keyboards (tracks 1–8, 11–12), drum machine (1–6, 8, 10–12), bass guitar (1–2, 12), guitar (5), string arrangement (7–8)
- Russell Thompson – saxophone (track 1)
- Pete Tokar – recording engineer (tracks 1, 3–11, overdubs on tracks 2, 12), audio mixing (1–2, 4, 6, 8, 12), organ played by (1)
- Dennis Williams – string arrangement (track 8)
- Raymond Williams – guitar (tracks 2, 4, 6, 11)
- Raymond Wise – string arrangement (track 7)
- Sherena Wynn – background vocals (track 1)
- Kenny Zahorcak – trumpet (track 1), flugelhorn (1)
- Monica Culpepper – Drum Programming (track 1)

== Charts ==
=== Weekly charts ===
Chart (2007)	Peak position
US Billboard 200	2
US Top R&B/Hip-Hop Albums (Billboard)	1

=== Year-end charts ===
Chart (2007)	Position
US Billboard 200	133
US Top R&B/Hip-Hop Albums (Billboard)	20
