= Jason Champion =

American gospel musician

- Born: Jason Lamar Champion; May 1, 1973 (age 53); Cleveland, Ohio
- Genres: gospel, urban contemporary gospel, Christian R&B, contemporary R&B
- Occupations: Singer, songwriter
- Instruments: vocals, singer-songwriter
- Years active: 1992–1996 (with band); 2008–present (solo)
- Label: EMI CMG
- Member of: Men at Large

Jason Lamar Champion (born May 1, 1973) is an American gospel musician. He started a music career in 1992 with Men at Large. He left the group in 2007 due to a "newly blossoming relationship with Jesus Christ." In 2008, he signed to EMI CMG, releasing his first and only album, Reflections, in 2008. It charted on the Billboard Gospel Albums chart, and he got a Grammy Award nomination at the 51st Annual Grammy Awards in the Best Contemporary R&B Gospel Album category.

== Early life ==
Champion was born in Cleveland, Ohio, on May 1, 1973, the only son of father Leonard Franklin Champion (December 6, 1952 – May 1, 1992), and mother Miriam Champion (Banks). His father died when he turned 18.

== Music career ==
His music career started in 1992 with the band Men at Large. He left the group in 2007 due to "experiencing the conviction of Jesus Christ upon his life" by a comment made by his fellow band member. This lead him to sign with EMI CMG, a division of Sony Music Entertainment in 2008. His album Reflections, released on May 27, 2008, charted on the Billboard Gospel Albums chart at No. 23. Charity Stafford reviewed the album at AllMusic, referring to the songs as "subtle but unmistakable declarations of faith". Melody Charles from Soul Tracks stated it "will put pep in your step on the way to Church on Sunday morning and could very well keep your spirits up throughout the rest of the week." John Fisher rated the album a 7/10 for Cross Rhythms and stated, "On the whole not a bad effort to kick start his EMI recording career though there doesn't appear to be a smash hit song here." The album was produced by Warryn Campbell of The Soul Seekers.

== Discography ==
List of studio albums, with selected chart positions
Title	Album details	Peak chart positions
Title	Album details	US Gos
Reflections	Released: May 27, 2008; Label: EMI CMG; CD, digital download	23
