= 1 of the Girls =

Cleveland-based R&B group

1 of the Girls was an American R&B group discovered by Gerald Levert. The group's self-titled album was released in 1993, and featured the single "Do da What", which only achieved moderate success. Another single, "Handle with Care", was also released from that album.

Nina Creque died in February 2019 from an "undisclosed illness".

== Members ==
- Nina Creque (the daughter of jazz musician Neal Creque)
- LaShawn Sykes
- Marvelous Ray Miles
- Ra-Deon Kirkland

== Albums ==
- Name: 1 of the Girls (1993)
- Tracks:
1. Ain't Giving Up Nothing 4:30
2. Do da What 5:11
3. Talkin' Loud 4:02
4. No Can Do 3:47
5. Handle with Care 5:11
6. Sorry Didn't Do It 6:41
7. Gotta Go 4:43
8. When We Kiss 4:54
9. Giving the Best of My Love 5:48
10. Will You Be Mine 5:19
11. I Don't Want Your Man 4:12
- Extra credits:

Artist	
Merlin Bobb	Mixing
Jason Champion	Composer, Vocal Arrangement
Michael Chapman	Drums, engineer, Keyboards, Mixing, producer, Programming, Sequencing
Nina Lornaya Creoke	Vocals
Robert Cunningham	Arranger, composer, Drums, Guitar, Keyboards, producer, Programming, Sequencing
Chris Frantz	Composer
Marc G.	Arranger, composer, Drums, Keyboards, producer, Programming, Sequencing, Vocal Arrangement
Ra-Deon Latrice Kirkland	Vocals
Gerald Levert	Arranger, composer, Keyboards, producer, Vocal Arrangement, Vocals (Background)
Joe Little III	Arranger, composer, producer
Marvelous Raye Miles	Vocals
Edwin "Tony" Nicholas	Arranger, composer, Drums, Keyboards, producer, Programming, Sequencing
One of the Girls	Composer, Primary Artist, Vocals (Background)
Scott Ramsayer	Engineer
Jim Salamone	Engineer
Leshawa Monique Sykes	Vocals
Trent Thomas	Composer, Keyboards, producer
Pete Tokar	Engineer, Mixing
Dave Tolliver	Composer, producer, Rap, Vocal Arrangement
Frank Vale	Mixing
Tina Weymouth	Composer
Perry Wilson	Composer
Gary Wright	Mixing

== Singles ==
Year	Song	Charts	
Year	Song	Hot 100	R&B
1993	"Do da What"	74	38
