= Relativity Records =

Record label

- Logo used from late 1995 to 1999
- Parent company: Sony Music Entertainment
- Founded: 1982; 44 years ago
- Founder: Barry Kobrin
- Defunct: 1999 (Relativity); 2017 (RED Music)
- Status: Defunct
- Distributor: RED Music
- Genre: Various
- Country of origin: United States
- Location: New York City, New York

Relativity Records was an American record label founded by Barry Kobrin at the site of his vinyl record shop, Important Record Distributors (IRD) in metropolitan New York City. The IRD distribution name was later known as RED Distribution and again as RED Music.

Relativity released music that covered a wide variety of musical genres. When it entered into a deal with Sony Music Entertainment, it became more known for its heavy metal and hip hop releases.

In 1999, Relativity was folded into Steve Rifkind's Loud Records, which in turn was shut down by Sony Music in 2002, with its parent distributor, RED Distribution, maintaining its existence, but later as RED Music, being merged into the Orchard in 2017 by Sony.

== History ==
Although it was reportedly established in 1985, there is evidence that the Relativity Records imprint began around the spring of 1982 as an in-house label of founder Barry Korbin's Important Record Distributors.

In the 1980s, Relativity Records was mostly focused on rock music, including heavy metal and punk rock. Releases in this genre were split among Relativity and its sister labels Combat and In-Effect Records. Following the recession of 1990, these labels were folded back into the main Relativity label. Later that year, Relativity signed Chris Lighty's Violator Records in a distribution deal with Chi-Ali, Fat Joe and the Beatnuts as part of the signees. Then, Sony Music Entertainment acquired a 50% stake in the company. Around 1992, the label underwent restructuring. Important Record Distributors, a former vinyl record store and distribution company for Relativity, was renamed Relativity Entertainment Distribution. Starting in June 1994, Relativity's label production and distribution in Canada, Europe and Australia would be handled by Sony's Epic Records and in Japan by Sony Music Japan. In 1995, the distribution company was shortened to RED Distribution. Meanwhile, Relativity entered into limited partnership deals with two regional independent hip hop record labels, Suave Records and Ruthless Records in 1993.

The success of Bone Thugs-n-Harmony at Ruthless following founder Eazy-E's death in 1995 granted them their own label division at Relativity, Mo Thugs Records, where they housed members and affiliates of their collective, Mo Thugs, in similarity to that of their rival groups Wu-Tang Clan's Killa Beez and Three 6 Mafia's Hypnotize Camp Posse. For Three 6 Mafia, their album, Chapter 1: The End, released in 1996 at the same time as Relativity rap group The Dayton Family's sophomore album, F.B.I., garnered the Memphis supergroup a distribution deal with the label.

Also, in 1996, Relativity Urban Assault, a compilation consisting of hip hop and R&B songs by the label's urban roster was released alongside Mo Thugs' Family Scriptures. In 1997, Relativity's dominance as an independent label began to deteriorate due to the decline of record sales, revenue and employment. They cut ties with Lighty's Violator brand, also ending their deals with Chi-Ali and Fat Joe, but keeping the Beatnuts within the label. That year, the Beatnuts, Bone Thugs-n-Harmony and Three 6 Mafia managed to save Relativity from dormancy with the releases of Stone Crazy, the number one Art of War and Chapter 2: World Domination, respectively. However, Chicago rapper Common, who had previously been a part of the imprint for 1992's Can I Borrow a Dollar? and 1994's Resurrection, was dropped from Relativity following the label's lack of promotion of his third album, One Day It'll All Make Sense (1997). 1998 followed with the releases of Link's Sex Down, Mo Thugs' Chapter II: Family Reunion, M.O.P.'s First Family 4 Life, Gangsta Boo's Enquiring Minds and Bizzy Bone's Heaven'z Movie, among other releases.

In 1999, the label released their final albums, Infamous Syndicate's Changing the Game, Tear da Club Up Thugs' CrazyNDaLazDayz, Bootleg's Death Before Dishonesty and Krayzie Bone's Thug Mentality 1999. Then, in June, Relativity's operations as a label was folded. Most of its urban roster was drafted to Steve Rifkind's Loud Records. From then on out, Loud took over a majority of Relativity's operations as a label and in-house distributor for Hypnotize Minds, the Beatnuts, Krayzie Bone, and M.O.P., while the rest of the major roster was moved from RCA Records to Columbia Records. Henchforth, as part of Loud's takeover of Relativity under Sony, they were required to distribute in North America under Columbia or Relativity's distribution parent, RED, while in Europe, they were to be distributed by or under Epic. In 2002, after Loud suffered and Rifkind began developing issues with Sony Music, they relinquished him from Loud Records and folded his imprint, effectively ending related operations of Relativity. However, RED Distribution remained active, distributing other labels like Artemis Records.

The Relativity brand was acquired by Sony Music (known at the time as Sony BMG) in 2007. Reissues by Relativity releases will be distributed by Sony instead of RED, which in 2017, was merged into The Orchard. Meanwhile, releases after Relativity under the RED Distribution banner will be handled by the Orchard.

== See also ==
- List of record labels
