= Love & Consequences =

Studio album by Gerald Levert
- Released: July 21, 1998
- Length: 63:56
- Label: EastWest
- Producer: Darrell "Delite" Allamby; Allen "Allstar" Gordon; R. Kelly; Gerald Levert; Joe Little III; Edwin "Tony" Nicholas; Manuel Seal

Gerald Levert chronology
Groove On (1994)	Love & Consequences (1998)	G (1999)

Professional ratings
Review scores
Source	Rating
AllMusic	3.5/5 stars

Love & Consequences is the third studio album by the American R&B singer Gerald Levert. It was released on July 21, 1998, on East West Records. In addition to his longtime collaborator, Edwin "Tony" Nicholas, Levert worked with more writers and producers including R. Kelly, Joe Little III of The Rude Boys (whom Levert discovered) and Darrell "Delite" Allamby. A commercial success, it peaked at number 17 on the US Billboard 200 and at number two on the Top R&B/Hip-Hop Albums, while receiving a platinum certification from the Recording Industry Association of America (RIAA).

== Track listing ==
No.	Title	Writer(s)	Producer(s)	Length
1.	"No Sense" (featuring Ken Dawg & Layzie Bone)	Gerald Levert; Edwin "Tony" Nicholas; Steven Howse; Ken Dawg	Levert; Nicholas	4:51
2.	"Thinkin' Bout It"	Gerald Levert; Darrell "Delite" Allamby; Lincoln Browder; Antoinette Roberson	Allamby	6:31
3.	"Point the Finger" (featuring Sean Levert)	Levert; Nicholas; Kenny Gamble; Gene McFadden; John Whitehead	Levert; Nicholas	4:30
4.	"Breaking My Heart"	G. Levert; S. Levert; Nicholas; Maurice White	Levert; Nicholas; Flavahood; Big Baby; Suga Mike	4:26
5.	"That's The Way I Feel About You" (featuring Mary J. Blige)	Bobby Womack	Levert; Nicholas; Sylvia Rhone	5:10
6.	"It's Your Turn"	Levert; Joe Little III	Levert; Little	5:30
7.	"No I'm Not the Blame"	Levert; Manuel Seal; Allen Gordon	Seal; Allstar	4:25
8.	"No Man's Land"	Levert; Little; Nicarlo Williams	Levert; Little	4:56
9.	"Men Like Us"	R. Kelly	R. Kelly	4:44
10.	"Taking Everything"	Allamby; Browder; Roberson; Lincoln Browder	Allamby	5:25
11.	"What About Me"	Levert; Nicholas	Levert; Nicholas	4:36
12.	"Definition of a Man"	Levert	Levert	4:27
13.	"Humble Me" (featuring Lemicah Levert)	Levert; Nicholas	Levert; Nicholas	4:25

== Charts ==
=== Weekly charts ===
Chart (1998)	Peak position
US Billboard 200	17
US Top R&B/Hip-Hop Albums (Billboard)	2

=== Year-end charts ===
Chart (1998)	Position
US Billboard 200	154
US Top R&B/Hip-Hop Albums (Billboard)	38
Chart (1999)	Position
US Top R&B/Hip-Hop Albums (Billboard)	87

== Certifications ==
Region	Certification	Certified units/sales
United States (RIAA)	Platinum	1,000,000^{^}
^{^} Shipments figures based on certification alone.
