= Black Men United =

1994 R&B supergroup

Black Men United (B.M.U.) was a collaboration of many African-American male R&B, neo soul and soul music artists. Their only song "U Will Know", written by a young D'Angelo, was released in 1994. It was featured in the film Jason's Lyric, and on the film's soundtrack.

== Artists involved ==
Many artists contributed to this effort. They include:

- Aaron Hall
- After 7
- Al B. Sure!
- Alejandre F. Johnson
- Boyz II Men
- Brian McKnight
- Christopher Williams
- D.R.S.
- D'Angelo (songwriter)
- Damion Hall
- El DeBarge
- Gerald LeVert
- H-Town
- Intro
- Joe
- Keith Sweat
- Lenny Kravitz (guitar)
- Lil' Joe (from The Rude Boys)
- Portrait
- R. Kelly
- Silk
- Stokley (lead singer of Mint Condition)
- Tevin Campbell
- Tony! Toni! Toné! (Raphael Saadiq and Dwayne Wiggins)
- Usher

== Charts ==
Year	Song	Chart	Peak position
1994	"U Will Know"	Hot R&B/Hip-Hop Songs	5
1994	"U Will Know"	Billboard Hot 100	28
