= Game Changer (Johnny Gill album) =

Studio album by Johnny Gill
- Released: December 9, 2014
- Genre: R&B
- Length: 47:32
- Labels: J Skillz; Caroline
- Producers: Johnny Gill (exec.); Babyface; Andre Brissett; Vidal Davis; Antonio Dixon; Chuck Harmony; Wirlie Morris; Gregg Pagani

Johnny Gill chronology
Still Winning (2011)	Game Changer (2014)	Game Changer II (2019)

Singles from Game Changer
- 1. "Behind Closed Doors" Released: August 12, 2014; 2. "Game Changer" Released: March 31, 2015; 3. "This One's For Me And You" Released: November 2015; 4. "5000 Miles" Released: January 27, 2017; 5. "What Is This" Released: November 21, 2017

Professional ratings
Review scores
Source	Rating
AllMusic	3.5/5 stars

Game Changer is the seventh studio album by American R&B singer Johnny Gill, released on December 9, 2014, by Gill's own label J Skillz Entertainment in conjunction with Caroline Records. Its release was preceded by the lead single "Behind Closed Doors." Game Changer debuted at number 56 on the US Billboard 200 and number 6 on the Billboard R&B chart.

== Critical reception ==
The album has received positive reviews from critics. Andy Kellman of AllMusic rated the album three-and-a-half stars out of five and stated that the album is better than Gill's previous album, Still Winning. Melody Charles of SoulTracks praised the album, stating that Gill "[keeps his] skills on-deck" and that he is "a contender worth rooting for".

== Track listing ==
No.	Title	Writer(s)	Producer(s)	Length
1.	"Your Body"	Carlos Battey; Steven Battey; Emile Ghantous; Lemarvin Harris; Gregg Pagani	Pagani	3:35
2.	"Behind Closed Doors"	Jaramye Daniels; Johnny Gill; Charles Harmon; Akil King; Kyle Owens	Chuck Harmony	3:50
3.	"This One's for Me and You" (featuring New Edition)	C. Battey; S. Battey; Pagani; Damon Sharpe; Lance Tolbert	Pagani	4:36
4.	"What Is This"	Emanuel Officer; Ralph Stacy	Stacy	4:24
5.	"Game Changer"	Brandon Coleman; Antonio Dixon; Kenneth "Babyface" Edmonds; Patrick "J. Que" Smith	Dixon; Edmonds	3:29
6.	"5000 Miles"	Daniels; Harmon; Owens	Daniels; Owens	3:31
7.	"You Choose Me"	Daniels; Harmon; Claude Kelly	Harmony	4:10
8.	"Strung Out"	Wirlie Morris; James Smith	Morris	3:52
9.	"Role Play"	Michael Angelo Saulsberry; Morris	Morris	4:18
10.	"Gonna Cost"	Vidal Davis; Dave Young	Davis	3:34
11.	"Can't Keep My Hands Off of You"	Daniels; Andre Brissett; Kelly	Brissett	3:44
12.	"Guinevere"	Sylvester Jordan; Brissett	Brissett	4:29
Total length:				47:32

== Charts ==
=== Weekly charts ===
Chart (2014–2015)	Peak position
US Billboard 200	56
US Independent Albums (Billboard)	4
US Top R&B/Hip-Hop Albums (Billboard)	6

=== Year-end charts ===
Chart (2015)	Position
US Top R&B/Hip-Hop Albums (Billboard)	49
