= The G Spot =

Studio album by Gerald Levert
- Released: October 15, 2002
- Length: 61:39
- Label: Elektra

Gerald Levert chronology
Gerald's World (2001)	The G Spot (2002)	Stroke of Genius (2003)

The G Spot is the sixth studio album by American R&B singer Gerald Levert. It was released by Elektra Records on October 15, 2002 in the United States.

== Critical reception ==
Professional ratings
Review scores
Source	Rating
AllMusic	2.5/5 stars

In his review for AllMusic, Jonathan Widran wrote that "this modern R&B stalwart has always offered the perfect blend of dreamy old-school soul textures; jangly, guitar-driven atmospheres; and slick, modern funk grooves. And oh, that voice – mellow and sexy, seductive to the core. The best 'come to beddy bye' tone since Barry White, and so steeped in that era."

== Track listing ==
No.	Title	Writer(s)	Producer(s)	Length
1.	"Too Much Room" (featuring Mystikal)	Gerald Levert; Flemuel Brown III; Michael Tyler; Randall Bowland	Levert; Bowland	4:30
2.	"Since You Ain't Around"	Levert; Brown; Bowland	Levert; Bowland	4:22
3.	"Wilding Me Out"	Levert; Edwin "Tony" Nicholas	Levert	4:34
4.	"Funny"	Levert; Brown; Niles McKinney; Bowland	Levert; Bowland	4:27
5.	"The Top of My Head"	Levert; Brown; McKinney; Bowland	Levert; Bowland	4:16
6.	"The G Spot"	Levert; Brown; Bowland	Levert; Bowland	5:09
7.	"Oh What a Night" (featuring Roy Ayers)	Levert; Brown; McKinney; Bowland	Levert; Bowland	4:52
8.	"Closure"	Levert; McKinney; Bowland	Levert; Bowland	4:43
9.	"Raindrops"	Levert; Brown; McKinney; Bowland	Levert; Bowland	5:25
10.	"Your Smile"	Nickolas Ashford; Valerie Simpson; Tommy Johnson	Levert	3:51
11.	"Backbone"	Levert; McKinney	Levert; Bowland	4:34
12.	"Catchin' Feelings"	Levert; Brown; Bowland	Levert; Bowland	4:53
13.	"All That Matters"	Levert; Brown; Bowland; Pam Artis	Levert; Bowland	4:54

Sample credits

- "Your Smile" contains a sample of "Your Precious Love", written by N. Ashford and V. Simpson and an interpolation of "This Will Be (An Everlasting Love)", written by C. Jackson and M. Yancy.
- "The Top of My Head" contains an interpolation of "Hollywood", written by L. Fischer and D. Wolinski.
- "All That Matters" contains an interpolation of "Family Reunion", written by K. Gamble and L. Huff.

== Charts ==
=== Weekly charts ===
Chart (2002)	Peak position
US Billboard 200	9
US Top R&B/Hip-Hop Albums (Billboard)	2

=== Year-end charts ===
Chart (2003)	Position
US Top R&B/Hip-Hop Albums (Billboard)	96
