= Game Changer II =

Studio album by Johnny Gill
- Released: June 19, 2019
- Length: 43:12
- Label: J Skillz; Kavalry

Johnny Gill chronology
Game Changer (2014)	Game Changer II (2019)

Game Changer II is the eighth studio album by American singer Johnny Gill. It was released by J Skillz Entertainment in conjunction with Kavalry Records. A sequel to his 2014 album Game Changer, it peaked at number 15 on the US Independent Albums chart.

== Critical reception ==
Professional ratings
Review scores
Source	Rating
Allmusic	4/5 stars

Allmusic editor Andy Kellman found that "in terms of quality and style" the album was "more of a mixed bag than the preceding LP [...] The songs skip across eras, moving from old-school pleaders to liquid late-'80s grooves to trap-styled beats, incorporating a lovely Luther Vandross homage ("That's My Baby") and a Jam and Lewis reunion ("So Hard") super-charged with inspiration from Bill Conti's Rock soundtrack. Gill handles all the turns with his deep baritone, growling and lilting only when necessary."

== Track listing ==
No.	Title	Writer(s)	Producer(s)	Length
1.	"Only One"	Elvis Williams; Rafael Dewayne Ishman; Joseph Eugene Williams; Aljamaal C Jones; Tom Laskey; Anthony R. Smith	Elvis "Blac Elvis" Williams; Red Kulture	3:26
2.	"Behind Closed Doors" (featuring Sheila E. and Santana)	E. Williams; Ishman; Siraaj Rhett; Jones; Laskey; Smith	Elvis "Blac Elvis" Williams; Red Kulture	3:55
3.	"Soul of a Woman"	Carlos Battey; Gregg Pagani	Pagani	4:21
4.	"Perfect" (featuring Ralph Tresvant)	Francesca "Francci" Richard; Jeffrey B. Anderson; Gregg Pagani	Pagani	4:05
5.	"Bed on Fire"	Claude Kelly; Charles Harmon	Louis York	4:18
6.	"Best Thing"	E. Williams; Ishman; Claude Vittorio Broome II; Jones; Joshua Duron Bush; Smith	Elvis "Blac Elvis" Williams; Red Kulture	3:28
7.	"Favorite Girl"	E. Williams; Ishman; Broome II; Jones; Bush; Smith	Elvis "Blac Elvis" Williams; Red Kulture	3:06
8.	"Lose a Lover, Keep a Friend"	E. Williams; Ishman; Broome II; Jones; Bush; Rick Watford	Elvis "Blac Elvis" Williams; Red Kulture	3:37
9.	"That's My Baby"	Johnny Gill; Dennis Bettis; Johnny Gill; Ralph B Stacy; Anderson Pittboss Johnson Jr.	Ralph B Stacy; Anderson Pittboss Johnson Jr.	4:13
10.	"Home" (featuring Kevon Edmonds)	Battey; Pagani; Rodney Thomas	Pagani	4:11
11.	"So Hard"	James Harris III; Terry Lewis; Tony Tolbert; Alex Richbourg	Jimmy Jam and Terry Lewis; Alex "God's Son" Richbourg (co.)	4:32

Target bonus tracks
No.	Title	Length
12.	"Angel"	4:02
13.	"Sexy Individual"	3:12
14.	"Beautiful You"	3:54

== Charts ==
Chart (2019)	Peak position
US Album Sales (Billboard)	52
US Independent Albums (Billboard)	15
