= Men at Large =

US musical group

- Origin: Cleveland, Ohio, United States
- Genres: R&B, new jack swing
- Years active: 1992–present
- Labels: East West
- Members: David "Dave" Tolliver; Jason L. Champion
- Past members: Edgar "Gemini" Porter (deceased)

Men at Large is an American R&B group. They were discovered by soul singer Gerald Levert.

== Discography ==
=== Albums ===
Year	Title	Label	US R&B Chart	US Top 200
1992	Men at Large	East West Records	24	122
1994	One Size Fits All	East West Records	17	151
1999	Love Struggle & Progress	Rival Records	-	-
2007	Back on Top	Couzan/Pyramid Media	-	-
2022	Love Benefits	Wydeload Entertainment/SRG	-	-

=== Singles ===
Year	Title	Chart Positions	
Year	Title	Billboard Hot 100	US Hot R&B/Hip Hop Singles
1992	"Use Me"	-	9
1992	"You Me"	-	29
1993	"Would You Like to Dance (With Me)"	-	87
1993	"So Alone"	31	5
1993	"Um Um Good"	-	39
1994	"Let's Talk About It"	-	10
1995	"Holiday"	-	62
1999	"If He Really Loves You"	-	-
2007	"Ayo"	-	-
2007	"Out of Town Lover"	-	-
2016	"Date Night"	-	14
