= Levert.Sweat.Gill =

Studio album by LSG
- Released: November 11, 1997
- Genre: R&B
- Length: 55:48
- Label: East West
- Producers: Darrell "Delite" Allamby; Sean "Puffy" Combs; Jermaine Dupri; Ron "Amen-Ra" Lawrence; Gerald Levert; Edwin "Tony" Nicholas; Jazze Pha; Rashad Smith; Keith Sweat

LSG chronology
Levert.Sweat.Gill (1997)	LSG2 (2003)

Singles from Levert.Sweat.Gill
- 1. "My Body" Released: October 14, 1997; 2. "Curious" Released: January 1998; 3. "Door #1" Released: April 1998; 4. "All the Times" Released: July 1998

Levert.Sweat.Gill is the debut studio album by American supergroup LSG. It was released by East West Records on November 11, 1997, in the United States. The album includes contributions from guest producers Sean "Puffy" Combs and Jermaine Dupri. The Lox, Faith Evans, Coko, Missy Elliott, LL Cool J, Busta Rhymes, MC Lyte, and Jazze Pha make guest appearances on the album. LSG peaked at number 4 on the US Billboard 200 and number 2 on the US Top R&B/Hip-Hop Albums. It was certified double platinum by the Recording Industry Association of America (RIAA).

== Critical reception ==
Professional ratings
Review scores
Source	Rating
AllMusic	4/5 stars
The Independent	3/5 stars
Los Angeles Times	2.5/4 stars
Robert Christgau	(2-star Honorable Mention)

AllMusic editor Leo Stanley wrote that "these guys know how to pick a good song and deliver it memorably. There are a few weak cuts scattered throughout the album, but they're so well crafted, they're easy to enjoy. But the true moments to treasure occur when everything falls into place — when they have a strong melody and lush production, LSG's voices blend in thrilling harmony and produce some truly affecting smooth R&B. And while its roots are certainly in old-fashioned, lover-man R&B, there's a distinct new flavor to the music [...] That helps make LSG's first album a satisfying debut indeed." Connie Johnson from The Los Angeles Times criticized the album's conservative style, stating that guest artists such as Faith Evans, MC Lyte, and The LOX outperformed the main trio. She concluded that the album was disappointing given the group's talent.

== Commercial performance ==
Levert.Sweat.Gill opened and peaked at number 4 on the US Billboard 200 and number 2 on the US Top R&B/Hip-Hop Albums, with first week sales of 138,000 copies. It was certified gold and platinum by the Recording Industry Association of America (RIAA) on December 12, 1997, and was later awarded double platinum on May 23, 2003, recognizing shipments of 2 million units. Levert.Sweat.Gill also reached the top 40 in the Netherlands, peaking at number 35 on the Dutch Albums Chart.

== Track listing ==
Levert.Sweat.Gill track listing
No.	Title	Writer(s)	Producer(s)	Length
1.	"Door #1"	Gerald Levert; Keith Sweat; Edwin "Tony" Nicholas	Levert; Nicholas	5:02
2.	"Round and Round"	Sweat; Nicholas	Sweat	5:03
3.	"You Got Me" (featuring The Lox)	Sean "Puffy" Combs; Daron Jones; David Styles; Levert; Jason Phillips; Jeffrey Walker; Johnny Gill; Ron Lawrence; Karen Anderson; Michael Keith; Quinnes Parker; Marvin Scandrick; Richard Rudolph; Teena Brocket	Lawrence; Combs	4:24
4.	"Where Did I Go Wrong" (featuring Jermaine Dupri)	Dupri; Seal	Dupri; Manuel Seal^{[a]}	4:02
5.	"My Body"	Antoinette Roberson; Allamby; Lincoln Browder	Allamby	4:07
6.	"All the Times" (featuring Faith Evans, Coko & Missy "Misdemeanor" Elliott)	Levert; Nicholas; Evans	Levert; Nicholas	4:51
7.	"My Side of the Bed"	Levert; Nicholas	Levert; Nicholas; Evans^{[a]}	5:04
8.	"Curious" (featuring LL Cool J, Busta Rhymes & MC Lyte)	Boaz Watson; Melvin Gentry; Bobby Lovelace; James Todd Smith; Trevor Smith; Lana Moorer	Rashad Smith; Armando Colon^{[a]}; Sweat^{[a]}	4:19
9.	"Let a Playa Get His Freak On" (featuring Jazze Pha)	Sweat; Ken "F-Fam" Fambro; Phalon Alexander	Pha; Sweat^{[a]}	4:57
10.	"Love Hurts"	Allen "Grip" Smith; Sweat	Sweat	5:10
11.	"Drove Me to Tears"	Levert; Nicholas	Levert; Nicholas	4:35
12.	"Where Would We Go"	A. Smith; Sweat	Sweat	4:16
Total length:				55:48

Notes

- ^{^a} denotes co-producer

Samples

- "You Got Me" contains a sample from "Behind the Groove" as performed by Teena Marie.
- "Curious" contains a sample from "Curious" as performed by Midnight Star.

== Charts ==
=== Weekly charts ===
Weekly chart performance for Levert.Sweat.Gill
Chart (1997–98)	Peak position
Dutch Albums (Album Top 100)	35
German Albums (Offizielle Top 100)	87
US Billboard 200	4
US Top R&B/Hip-Hop Albums (Billboard)	2

=== Year-end charts ===
Year-end chart performance for Levert.Sweat.Gill
Chart (1998)	Position
US Billboard 200	45
US Top R&B/Hip-Hop Albums (Billboard)	5

== Certifications ==
Certifications for Levert.Sweat.Gill
Region	Certification	Certified units/sales
United States (RIAA)	2× Platinum	2,000,000^{^}
^{^} Shipments figures based on certification alone.
