= Private Line (album) =

Studio album by Gerald Levert
- Released: October 15, 1991
- Studios: Right Tracks (Cleveland, Ohio); Soundworks (New York City, New York)
- Genre: R&B
- Length: 61:53
- Label: East West
- Producers: Marc Gordon; Gerald Levert; Edwin "Tony" Nicholas

Gerald Levert chronology
Private Line (1991)	Groove On (1994)

Professional ratings
Review scores
Source	Rating
AllMusic	4/5 stars

Private Line is the debut solo album by American singer-songwriter and producer Gerald Levert, following his tenure with the group LeVert. It was released by East West Records on October 15, 1991, in the United States. The album reached number one on the US Top R&B/Hip-Hop Albums where it spent two weeks atop in 1992. Private Line also topped the Top Heatseekers album chart and peaked at number 48 on the Billboard 200. It spawned four singles: the title track, "School Me," "Can U Handle It" and "Baby Hold On to Me," the last of which is a duet with his father, Eddie Levert.

The song "Private Line" spent one week at number one on the US R&B chart, although it failed to reach the Billboard Hot 100 pop chart. The song was Levert's solo debut single.

== Track listing ==
No.	Title	Writer(s)	Producer(s)	Length
1.	"Private Line"	Gerald Levert; Edwin "Tony" Nicholas	Levert; Nicholas	5:41
2.	"School Me"	Levert; Nicholas	Levert; Nicholas	5:55
3.	"Baby Hold On to Me" (duet with Eddie Levert)	Levert; Nicholas	Levert; Nicholas	5:42
4.	"Can You Handle It"	Levert; Nicholas	Levert; Nicholas	4:50
5.	"Shootin' the Breeze"	Levert; Nicholas	Levert; Nicholas	4:16
6.	"I Wanna Be Bad"	Levert; Nicholas	Levert; Nicholas	4:43
7.	"Just a Little Something"	Levert; Marc Gordon	Levert; Gordon	5:41
8.	"Hurting for You"	Levert; Nicholas	Levert; Nicholas	6:02
9.	"Just Because I'm Wrong"	Levert; Nicholas	Levert; Nicholas	4:42
10.	"Hugs & Kisses"	Levert; Nicholas	Levert; Nicholas	4:12
11.	"You Oughta Be with Me"	Levert; Gordon	Levert; Gordon	4:37
12.	"Private Line" (Radio Club Remix)	Levert; Nicholas	Levert; Nicholas	4:55

== Personnel ==
- Gerald Levert – vocals, backing vocals, vocal arrangements
- Marc Gordon – keyboards (1, 7, 11), keyboard programming (1, 7, 11), sequencing (1, 7, 11), drums (1, 7, 11)
- Edwin "Tony" Nicholas – keyboards (1–6, 8–10), keyboard programming (1–6, 8–10), sequencing (1–6, 8–10), drums (1–6, 8–10)
- Randy Bowland – guitars (2–7, 9–11)
- Cliff Colson – bass guitar (2, 3, 7)
- Bill Ransom – percussion (5)
- Russell Thompson – saxophone (2)
- John Brinson – string arrangements (7, 8)
- Eddie Levert – vocals (3)

=== Production ===
- Gerald Levert – producer and arrangements
- Edwin Nicholas – producer and arrangements (1–6, 8–12)
- Marc Gordon – producer and arrangements (7, 11)
- Martin Van Blockson – mixing (1), additional producer (12), remixing (12)
- Stephen Seltzer – engineer (1–5, 9, 12)
- Merlin Bobb – mixing (1–5, 9, 12)
- Peter Tokar – mix engineer (6–8, 10, 11)

== Charts ==
=== Weekly charts ===
Chart (1991)	Peak position
US Billboard 200	48
US Top R&B/Hip-Hop Albums (Billboard)	1

=== Year-end charts ===
Chart (1992)	Position
US Top R&B/Hip-Hop Albums (Billboard)	2

== Certifications ==
Region	Certification	Certified units/sales
United States (RIAA)	Platinum	1,000,000^{^}
^{^} Shipments figures based on certification alone.

== See also ==
- List of number-one R&B albums of 1992 (U.S.)
