= My Body (LSG song) =

1997 single by LSG

Single by LSG

from the album Levert.Sweat.Gill
- B-side: "Check is in the Mail"
- Released: October 14, 1997
- Genre: R&B
- Length: 4:08
- Label: East West
- Songwriters: Antoinette Roberson; Darrell "Delite" Allamby; Lincoln Browder
- Producers: Darrell "Delite" Allamby; Victor "Lundon" Jones

LSG singles chronology
"My Body" (1997)	"Curious" (1998)

"My Body" is a song by R&B group LSG released as the first single from their debut album Levert.Sweat.Gill. It is the group's most successful song, spending seven weeks at number-one on the US R&B chart. It also reached number four on the Billboard Hot 100 in late 1997 for three weeks.

== Charts ==
=== Weekly charts ===
Chart (1997–1998)	Peak position
UK Singles (Official Charts)	21
UK Hip Hop/R&B (Official Charts)	2
US Billboard Hot 100	4
US Hot R&B/Hip-Hop Songs (Billboard)	1

=== Year-end charts ===
Chart (1997)	Position
US Hot R&B/Hip-Hop Songs (Billboard)	58

Chart (1998)	Position
US Billboard Hot 100	34
US Hot R&B/Hip Hop Songs (Billboard)	7

== Certifications ==
Region	Certification	Certified units/sales
United States (RIAA)	Platinum	1,100,000

== See also ==
- R&B number-one hits of 1997 (USA)
- R&B number-one hits of 1998 (USA)
