= Jason's Lyric (soundtrack) =

Jason's Lyric (The Original Motion Picture Soundtrack)

Soundtrack album to Jason's Lyric by various artists
- Released: September 27, 1994
- Recorded: 1993–94
- Genres: R&B; hip hop
- Length: 1:17:34
- Label: Mercury Records
- Producers: Adam Kidron (exec.); Doug McHenry (exec.); Ed Eckstine (exec.); George Jackson (exec.); Sam Sapp (exec.); Aaron "Freedom" Lyles; Ahmad; Brian C. Walls; Brian McKnight; Chad "Dr. Ceuss" Elliott; D'Angelo; D'wayne Wiggins; Eddie Kramer; Ike Lee III; James Mtume; Jam Master Jay; Kenny Whitehead; Mike Dean; Mint Condition; Narada Michael Walden; N.O. Joe; QDIII; Scarface; Scott Blockland; The Whole 9; Tony "T-Funk" Pearyer; Warren G

Singles from Jason's Lyric
- 1. "U Will Know" Released: October 4, 1994; 2. "If You Think You're Lonely Now" Released: February 7, 1995; 3. "Crazy Love" Released: June 20, 1995

Professional ratings
Review scores
Source	Rating
AllMusic	4.5/5 stars

Jason's Lyric (The Original Motion Picture Soundtrack) is the soundtrack to Doug McHenry's 1994 film Jason's Lyric. It was released on September 27, 1994, via Mercury Records. It spawned three singles: "If You Think You're Lonely Now", a cover of the Bobby Womack hit by Jodeci lead singer K-Ci, "Crazy Love" by Brian McKnight, and "U Will Know", a major collaboration from male R&B singers comprising Black Men United (BMU), written by future neo soul artist D'Angelo.

Many artists contributed to this effort, including: Aaron Hall, After 7, Al B. Sure!, Boyz II Men, Intro, Brian McKnight, Christopher Williams, D.R.S. Dirty Rotten Scoundrels, Damion Hall, El DeBarge, Gerald LeVert, H-Town, Ice-T, Joe, Keith Sweat, Lenny Kravitz (guitar), Joe N Little III Lil' Joe from The Rude Boys, Portrait, R. Kelly, Silk, Sovory, Stokley Williams, Tevin Campbell, Tony! Toni! Toné! (Raphael Wiggins and Dwayne Wiggins), Usher and Snoop Dogg

The album peaked at number 17 on the Billboard 200 and topped the Top R&B/Hip-Hop Albums chart.

== Track listing ==
No.	Title	Producer(s)	Length
1.	"U Will Know" (performed by Black Men United^{[c]})	Brian McKnight; D'Angelo; Bob Power^{[a]}	4:00
2.	"Forget I Was a 'G'" (performed by Whitehead Brothers)	Kenny Whitehead; Larry Gold^{[a]}	3:56
3.	"Candy Man" (performed by LL Cool J)	Chad "Dr. Ceuss" Elliott	3:57
4.	"If Trouble Was Money" (performed by Mint Condition and Albert Collins)	Mint Condition	3:51
5.	"Just Like My Papa" (performed by Tony! Toni! Toné!)	D'wayne Wiggins	3:43
6.	"If You Think You're Lonely Now" (performed by K-Ci)	James Mtume	3:56
7.	"Rodeo Style" (performed by Jamecia Bennett and Mike "Funky Mike" Jackson)	Chad "Dr. Ceuss" Elliott	4:23
8.	"Up and Down" (performed by J. Quest)	Aaron "Freedom" Lyles; Ike Lee III; Gerry E. Brown^{[b]}	4:01
9.	"Walk Away" (performed by Da 5 Footaz)	Warren G	3:42
10.	"Love Is the Key" (performed by LSD)	QD3	4:04
11.	"No More Love" (performed by DRS)	The Whole 9	4:11
12.	"Crazy Love" (performed by Brian McKnight)	Brian McKnight	4:02
13.	"That's How It Is" (performed by Ahmad)	Ahmad; Brian C. Walls	3:57
14.	"First Round Draft Pick" (performed by the Twinz)	Warren G	4:01
15.	"Brothers and Sistas" (performed by Jayo Felony)	Jam Master Jay; Tony "T-Funk" Pearyer	3:52
16.	"This City Needs Help" (performed by Buddy Guy)	Eddie Kramer; Gerry E. Brown^{[b]}	2:50
17.	"Nigga Sings the Blues" (performed by Spice 1)		3:19
18.	"Jesse James" (performed by Scarface)	Mike Dean; N.O. Joe; Scarface	3:51
19.	"Love Is Still Enough" (performed by Savory)	Scott Blockland	3:55
20.	"Many Rivers to Cross" (performed by Oleta Adams)	Narada Michael Walden	4:03
Total length:			1:17:34

Notes

- ^{^[a]} signifies a co-producer
- ^{^[b]} signifies an additional producer
- ^{^[c]} included Lenny Kravitz, Tevin Campbell, Gerald Levert, El DeBarge, Usher, R. Kelly, Brian McKnight, Boyz II Men, Melvin Edmonds, Keith Sweat, Raphael Saadiq, Christopher Williams, Joe and D'Angelo

Sample credits

- Track 2 contains a replayed sample from "Jungle Boogie" by Ronald Bell, George Melvin Brown, Claydes Charles Smith, Robert Spike Mickens, Donald Boyce, Ricky Westfield, Dennis Thomas and Robert Bell
- Track 4 contains samples from "God Lives Through" by A Tribe Called Quest

== Charts ==
=== Weekly charts ===
Chart (1994)	Peak position
US Billboard 200	17
US Top R&B/Hip-Hop Albums (Billboard)	1

=== Year-end charts ===
Chart (1994)	Position
US Top R&B/Hip-Hop Albums (Billboard)	33

Chart (1995)	Position
US Billboard 200	112
US Top R&B/Hip-Hop Albums (Billboard)	21

== Certifications ==
Region	Certification	Certified units/sales
United States (RIAA)	Platinum	1,000,000^{^}
^{^} Shipments figures based on certification alone.

== See also ==
- List of Billboard number-one R&B albums of 1994
