= U Will Know =

1994 single by Black Men United

Single by Black Men United

from the album Jason's Lyric (The Original Motion Picture Soundtrack)
- Released: October 4, 1994
- Genre: R&B
- Length: 4:25
- Label: Mercury
- Songwriters: Luther Archer; Michael Archer
- Producers: D'Angelo; Brian McKnight

Music video
- "U Will Know" on YouTube

"U Will Know" is a song by American R&B supergroup Black Men United, released in 1994 via Mercury Records. It is featured on the soundtrack to the 1994 film Jason's Lyric and the group's only song.

== Background ==
In the song, the singers shed light on the rapid deaths of young African American males due to Black-on-Black crime. The proceeds from the record were donated to charities and to promote the message of peace.

== Charts ==
Chart (1994–1995)	Peak position
New Zealand (Recorded Music NZ)	3
UK Singles (Official Charts)	23
US Billboard Hot 100	28
US Hot R&B/Hip-Hop Songs (Billboard)	5
US Cash Box Top 100	39
