= Johnny Gill =

American R&B singer (born 1966)

- Gill in 2026

Background information
- Also known as: J.G., Skillz
- Born: Johnny Gill Jr. May 22, 1966 (age 60); Washington, D.C., U.S.
- Genres: R&B; soul; new jack swing
- Occupations: Singer; songwriter
- Instruments: Vocals; guitar; piano
- Years active: 1982–present
- Labels: Cotillion; Motown; Notifi; Caroline; MNRK
- Member of: New Edition
- Website: johnnygill.com

Johnny Gill Jr. (born May 22, 1966) is an American singer and songwriter. He is the sixth and final member of the R&B/pop group New Edition and was also a member of the supergroup called LSG, with Gerald Levert and Keith Sweat. Gill has released eight solo albums, three albums with New Edition, two albums with LSG, and one collaborative album with Stacy Lattisaw. Gill has sold over 15 million copies worldwide as a solo artist.

== Early life ==
Gill was born on May 22, 1966, in Washington, D.C., the son of Johnny Gill Sr., a Baptist minister, and his wife, Annie Mae Gill, who had four boys. He started singing at the age of five, performing in church in a family gospel group called Little Johnny and "Wings of Faith". The group included his brothers Bobby, Jeff, and Randy Gill, a solo recording artist and member of the group II D Extreme.

Gill attended Kimball Elementary, Sousa Junior High, and Duke Ellington School of the Arts. His career dictated that he complete his high-school education through the services of a tutor. Gill planned to attend college to pursue a degree in electrical engineering, but decided to focus on his singing career.

== Music career ==
=== Early career ===
Gill's recording career began in 1982, at the age of 16, when his childhood friend Stacy Lattisaw convinced him to record a demo. This demo fell into the hands of the president of Atlantic Records, and his first self-titled debut album was released shortly thereafter on Atlantic subsidiary Cotillion Records. Gill then teamed up with Stacy for the duet album Perfect Combination. A second solo album on Cotillion Records, Chemistry, was released in 1985.

=== New Edition ===
Gill began a new chapter in his career in 1987, when he was recruited by Michael Bivins to join New Edition. Bobby Brown had been voted out of the group and Gill was brought in to replace lead singer Ralph Tresvant, who was rumored at the time to be leaving to pursue a solo career. Gill became the only member of New Edition who was not from Boston. With Gill, the oldest member, as one of the lead singers (along with Tresvant, who ended up staying with New Edition and delaying the launch of his solo career) on the album Heart Break, the group developed a more mature, adult sound, hitting the charts with songs such as "Can You Stand The Rain", "N.E. Heartbreak", "If It Isn't Love", and the Gill-led "Boys to Men".

=== Solo career ===
Continuing his role as a romantic balladeer while emerging as a new jack swing star, he released a self-titled third album in 1990, which included the hits "My, My, My", "Rub You the Right Way", "Fairweather Friend", and "Wrap My Body Tight".

In 1993, Gill released another solo project, Provocative, which included the songs "Quiet Time to Play", "A Cute, Sweet, Love Addiction", and the gospel song, "I Know Where I Stand".

In 1996, Gill released Let's Get the Mood Right, which included the song, "Love In an Elevator", and the single "Maybe". The same year, Johnny reunited with New Edition and recorded the album Home Again.

=== LSG ===
In 1997, he collaborated with Gerald Levert and Keith Sweat to form the supergroup LSG (Levert-Sweat-Gill), which yielded the multi-platinum debut album Levert.Sweat.Gill and the trio’s final album LSG2 in 2003. In 2004, he reunited with New Edition; it signed with Bad Boy Records and released the album One Love, which included the single "Hot 2Nite".

=== Return to solo career ===
In 2011, 15 years after recording his last solo album, Gill returned with Still Winning, which included "In the Mood", "Just the Way You Are", "It Would Be You", and "2nd Place". In 2014, Gill left Fontana Records and started his own label, J Skillz Records, on which he released the album Game Changer. The album produced several adult R&B radio hits, including the singles "Behind Closed Doors" and the title track, "Game Changer". His New Edition bandmates appear on "This One's for Me and You". Gill joined Fantasia as an opener for Charlie Wilson's In It to Win It tour, which kicked off in February 2017. On September 6, 2019, Gill released his album Game Changer II. Beginning in 2023, Gill enjoyed a resurgence of popularity with his song, "Rub You the Right Way" on the popular social media app TikTok, with various influencers using the song for their videos.

== Acting career ==
Gill has had over 80 television and film appearances as a singer and actor. He had a cameo role on the TV show Family Matters, and sang "You For Me" in the 2006 movie Madea's Family Reunion. Gill starred in the 2009 stage play A Mother's Prayer, alongside Robin Givens, Shirley Murdock, and Jermaine Crawford.

== Awards and accolades ==
Grammy Awards

Gill has received two Grammy Award nominations: one with New Edition and one as a solo artist.

Awards and nominations for Johnny Gill
Year	Nominated work	Award	Result
1989	"If It Isn't Love" (with New Edition)	Best R&B Performance by a Duo or Group with Vocals	Nominated
1991	Johnny Gill	Best Male R&B Vocal Performance	Nominated

In 1991, Gill won two Soul Train Awards: for Best R&B/Urban Contemporary Album of the Year – Male (for Johnny Gill) and for Best R&B/Urban Contemporary Single (for "My My My").

In 2019, Gill won the SoulTracks Readers' Choice Award for Album of the Year (for Game Changer II).

== Discography ==
Studio albums

- Johnny Gill (1983)
- Chemistry (1985)
- Johnny Gill (1990)
- Provocative (1993)
- Let's Get the Mood Right (1996)
- Still Winning (2011)
- Game Changer (2014)
- Game Changer II (2019)

Collaboration albums

- Perfect Combination with Stacy Lattisaw (1984)
- Heart Break with New Edition (1988)
- Home Again with New Edition (1996)
- Levert.Sweat.Gill with LSG (1997)
- LSG2 with LSG (2003)
- One Love with New Edition (2004)

== Tour ==
- Johnny Gill Tour 1990–1991
- Provocative Tour 1993 (1993)
- Let's Get the Mood Right Tour (1996–1997)
- 21 Nights in Japan: Still Winning (2011)
- Game Changer Tokyo Live (2015)
- Charlie Wilson's In It to Win It Tour (2016)
- Culture Tour New Edition (2022)
- Legacy Tour New Edition (2023)
- The New Edition Way Tour (2026)
