= Link (singer) =

American singer

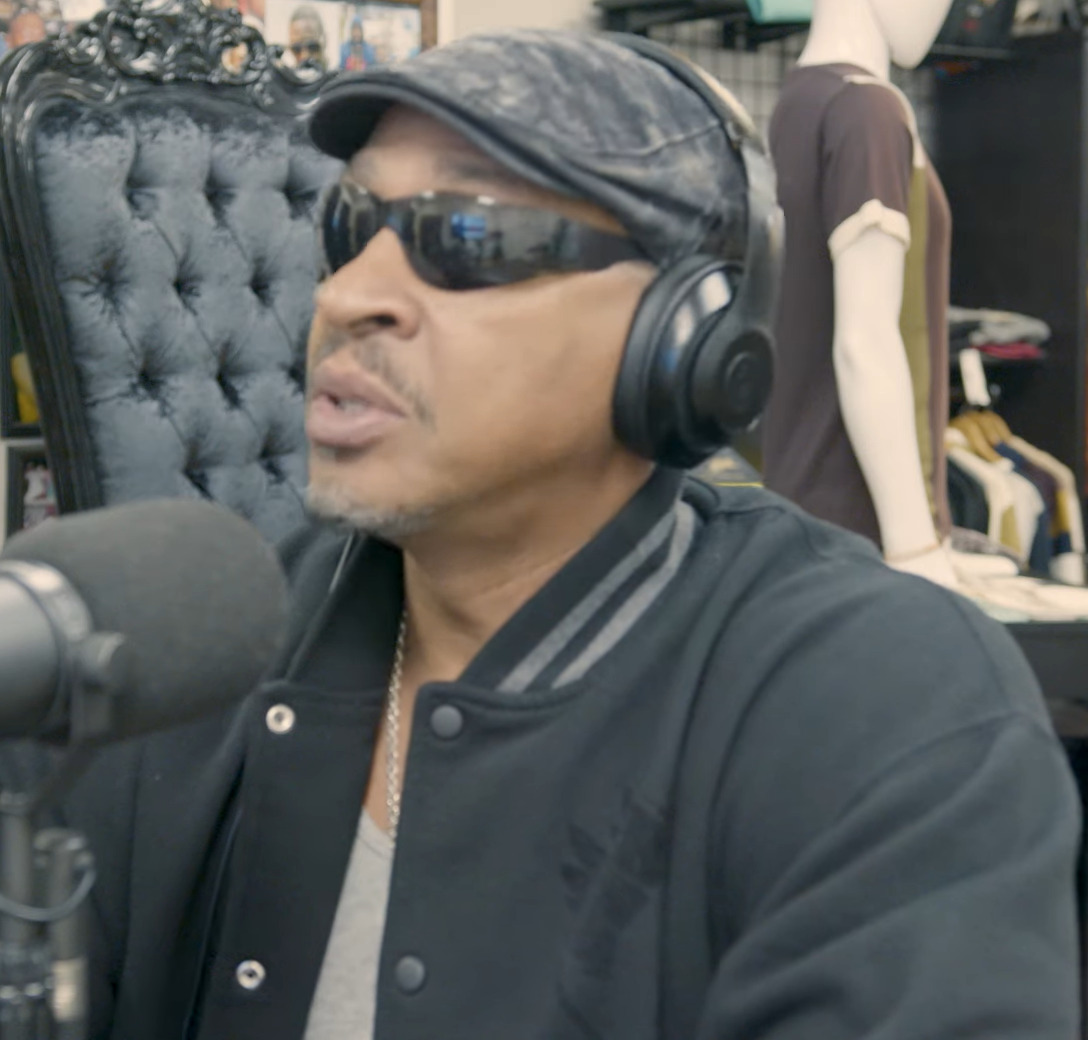
- Link in 2025

Background information
- Also known as: MC Smooth, Needa S.
- Born: Lincoln Browder
- Origin: Dallas, Texas, U.S.
- Genres: R&B
- Occupation: singer
- Years active: 1980s–present

Lincoln Browder (born October 12, 1964), better known by his stage name Link, is an American R&B singer from Dallas, Texas. He is best known for his 1998 single “Whatcha Gonna Do”.

== Career ==
Browder sang in gospel choirs as a youngster and in a group in high school. Darrell Delite Allamby recruited him to sing in the R&B group Protege.

After writing the hit "My Body" for the R&B supergroup LSG, Link was offered his own recording contract with Relativity Records. His 1998 debut album, Sex Down, spawned one Top 40 hit single in the US, "Whatcha Gonna Do?" (#23 Billboard Hot 100, #15 US Billboard R&B). The track peaked at #48 in the UK Singles Chart in November 1998. In addition a second charting single was issued, "I Don't Wanna See," which reached #43 on the US R&B chart and #25 on the Hot Singles Sales chart.

Link also wrote songs for Silk, Tony Thompson, Tamar Braxton, K-Ci & JoJo and Gerald Levert.

In 2008, he released his second album Creepin independently. Additionally, a digital single "Erotic" was released in 2013.

== Discography ==
=== Albums ===
Year	Title	Chart positions	
Year	Title	U.S.	U.S. R&B
1998	Sex Down: Released: June 23, 1998; Label: Relativity	187	46
2008	Creepin: Released: May 29, 2008; Label: Superstar Music Group	-	-

=== Singles ===
Year	Title	Chart positions	
Year	Title	U.S.	U.S. R&B
1998	Whatcha Gone Do?	23	15
1999	I Don't Wanna See	-	43
2013	Erotic	-	-
