= Joe Little III =

- Joe Little in April of 2022 at Claridge Hotel in Atlantic City, NJ

Background information
- Born: Joe N Little III; July 14, 1968 (age 58); Cleveland, Ohio, U.S.
- Genres: R&B, Soul, Jazz
- Occupations: Songwriter, record producer, singer, musician
- Instruments: Vocals, Piano
- Label: Atlantic Records

Joe N Little III (born July 14, 1968) is an American singer, songwriter and producer who is best known as the lead singer, and last surviving member of the 1990s R&B group, Rude Boys, who had two No. 1 R&B singles, "Written All Over Your Face" and "Are You Lonely For Me", on Billboard's R&B/Hip Hop Chart. They received a Billboard Music Award for "Written All Over Your Face", as the No. 1 R&B song of 1991.

== Early life ==
Little was born on July 14, 1968, in Cleveland, Ohio, to parents Joe Little Jr., and Patricia Ann Little.

== Career ==
=== Rude Boys ===
In 1987, Little along with friends Edward Lee Banks, Larry Marcus, and Melvin Sephus (Rude Boys) was discovered by R&B singer Gerald Levert who got them a record contract with Atlantic Records.

In 1990, Rude Boys released their debut album entitled, "Rude Awakening" releasing 4 singles, "Heaven", "Come Let's Do This", and their two Billboard top charting No.1 R&B hits, "Written All Over Your Face" a top 20 on Billboard's Top 100 chart, and "Are You Lonely For Me". They released two more albums: "Rude House" in 1992 and "Rude As Ever" in 1997.

=== Writing and producing ===
Through the 90s and 2000s Little collaborated with other artists, producing and songwriting. In 1998, he co-wrote and produced two singles, "It's Your Turn" and "No Mans Land", for Levert's RIAA Platinum-certified album "Love & Consequences" In 2000, Little and Levert co-wrote and produced the singles "Selfish Reasons" and "Proven and True" for The Temptations' album "Ear-Resistible", which won a Grammy Award for Best Traditional R&B Vocal Album.

=== Solo projects ===
In 1994, as solo artist, Little released his debut album entitled, "Puttin' It Down" on Atlantic Records under the name J. Little. four singles, "When I Think Of You", "Beautiful", "Holiday Song" and "All Of Me" on his own label, Brother 2 Brother International. In September of that year, Little participated in the group Black Men United along with Al B. Sure, Keith Sweat, El DeBarge, Christopher Williams, Brian McKnight and Little's then-mentor Gerald Levert recording the track "U Will Know" from the soundtrack to Doug McHenry's 1994 film Jason's Lyric.

=== Other work ===
In 2010, Little opened a coffee shop in Cleveland, Ohio where he grew up named, Urbean Joe Coffee House on St. Clair Avenue near 152nd Street. He opened a second location in May 2011 at Larchmere Boulevard near Shaker Square.

== Discography ==
=== Rude Boys ===
Albums

- Rude Awakening - 1990
- Rude House - 1992
- Rude As Ever - 1997

Singles

- Come On Let's Do It - 1990
- Written All Over Your Face - 1990
- Are You Lonely For Me - 1991
- Heaven - 1991
- My Kind Of Girl - 1993
- Go Ahead And Cry - 1993
- Nothing To One - 1997

=== Solo ===
Albums

- Puttin' It Down - 1994

Singles

- When I Think Of You - 2019
- Beautiful - 2020
- Holiday Song - 2021
- All Of Me - 2021
