= LSG (group) =

American contemporary R&B group

- Origin: New London, Connecticut, United States
- Genres: R&B
- Years active: 1996–2003; 2013–2025 (reunion)
- Labels: East West, Elektra
- Past members: Keith Sweat; Johnny Gill; Gerald Levert; Eddie Levert

LSG was an R&B supergroup, composed of R&B artists Gerald Levert from Cleveland, Ohio, Keith Sweat from Harlem, New York and Johnny Gill from Washington, D.C. The group's name "LSG" is derived from the first letter in the last name of each artist (Levert, Sweat, Gill).

== History ==
This project began when Keith Sweat called Gerald Levert and told him about an idea to record with Johnny Gill.

In 1997, LSG released their debut album titled Levert.Sweat.Gill. With the chart-topping lead single "My Body", the album was quickly certified platinum. For their 1997 debut album, they collaborated with popular producers and guest appearances including Sean Combs, Jermaine Dupri, LL Cool J, MC Lyte, and Busta Rhymes.

LSG released a follow-up final album in 2003 titled LSG2.

== Discography ==
=== Studio albums ===
Title	Details	Peak chart positions					Certifications (sales threshold)
Title	Details	US	US R&B	FRA	NL	UK	Certifications (sales threshold)
Levert.Sweat.Gill	Release date: November 11, 1997; Label: East West Records; Formats: CD, cassette	4	2	—	35	79	US: 2× Platinum
LSG2	Release date: July 28, 2003; Label: East West/Elektra Records; Formats: CD	6	3	127	—	—	
"—" denotes releases that did not chart

=== Singles ===
Year	Single	Peak chart positions					Certifications (sales threshold)	Album
Year	Single	US	US R&B	NL	NZ	UK	Certifications (sales threshold)	Album
1997	"My Body"	4	1	32	18	21	US: Platinum	Levert.Sweat.Gill
1998	"Curious"	—	—	—	—	23		Levert.Sweat.Gill
1998	"Door #1"	—	—	—	—	45		Levert.Sweat.Gill
2003	"Just Friends"	—	74	—	—	—		LSG2
2003	"Shakedown"	—	—	—	—	—		LSG2
"—" denotes releases that did not chart
