= Gerald Levert =

American singer-songwriter and producer (1966–2006)

- Levert in 1988

Background information
- Also known as: Shadow; The Teddy Bear
- Born: Gerald Edward Levert; July 13, 1966; Canton, Ohio, U.S.
- Died: November 10, 2006 (aged 40) Cleveland, Ohio, U.S.
- Genres: R&B; soul; new jack swing
- Occupations: Singer–songwriter; record producer
- Instrument: Vocals
- Years active: 1983–2006
- Labels: Atlantic; EastWest; Elektra
- Formerly of: LeVert; LSG

Gerald Edward Levert (July 13, 1966 – November 10, 2006) was an American singer-songwriter and producer. The son of singer Eddie Levert, he formed the R&B vocal group LeVert alongside his brother, Sean Levert, and friend Marc Gordon. He was also a member of the supergroup LSG, along with Keith Sweat and Johnny Gill. Levert is often credited with the discovery of R&B groups The Rude Boys, Men at Large, and 1 of the Girls. He released nine solo albums, and posthumously won a Grammy Award. In 2013, he was a part of the inaugural National Rhythm & Blues Hall of Fame inductees.

== Early life and education ==
Levert was born on July 13, 1966, in Canton, Ohio, to the frontman of the O'Jays, Eddie Levert, and his wife Martha. He grew up in Shaker Heights, Ohio, a suburb of Cleveland.

Levert often joined his father and his band on the road for their various performances. While in high school, Levert's inclination towards music became apparent when he formed the trio LeVert, with his younger brother Sean Levert (September 28, 1968 – March 30, 2008) and friend Marc Gordon in 1983.

== Singing career ==
Four of LeVert's seven albums went gold.

Levert's first solo album, Private Line, debuted in 1991 and topped the R&B charts. The following year, Gerald and his father, Eddie Levert, topped the R&B charts again with the single, "Baby Hold On to Me". Levert recorded a string of albums throughout the 1990s and early 2000s, that contained the hit singles, "Thinkin' About It" (No. 12 Pop) which was released June 23, 1998, "Taking Everything" (No. 11 Pop), "Funny", "Mr. Too Damn Good to You", "U Got That Love", and a remake of R. Kelly's "I Believe I Can Fly", along with gospel singer Yolanda Adams. Levert also sang lead vocals in two songs on the 2002 film documentary "Standing in the Shadows of Motown" - the story of the Funk Brothers. Levert performed "Shotgun" and "Reach Out I'll Be There". Levert released his tenth album, Voices, in 2005.

Levert wrote and produced songs for other artists such as Patti LaBelle, Barry White, Stephanie Mills, Anita Baker, Eugene Wilde, Teddy Pendergrass, James Ingram, Freddie Jackson, Chuckii Booker, the Rude Boys, New Edition, Men at Large, The O'Jays, Keith Washington and 1 of the Girls. In 1994, Levert appeared in the group Black Men United for the hit single "U Will Know" for the Jason's Lyric soundtrack; other members of the group included Keith Sweat, Christopher Williams and Levert's former mentor Joe Little of the Rude Boys. In 1997, Levert teamed up again with fellow singers Keith Sweat and Johnny Gill, to form the supergroup, LSG. The trio released the album Levert.Sweat.Gill the same year, selling over two million copies; it was followed by LSG2 in 2003.

In 1999, Levert sang the chorus on the Chris Rock spoken-word comedy piece, "No Sex (In the Champagne Room)". Levert performed a duet with Teena Marie on the latter's 2004 album La Doña. In 2001, Levert teamed up with Music Manager, Howard Perl, to begin a music publishing & licensing enterprise. Levert's last collaborations included Jim Brickman on the song "My Angel", for Brickman's 2006 album entitled Escape and on the song "Real S***" from rapper Styles P's album, Time Is Money. Levert was posthumously featured again on former groupmates Keith Sweat's "Knew It All Along" and Johnny Gill from the singer's Til the Morning album, which was released two days before Levert's fifth anniversary of his death. Levert was also posthumously featured on Keith Sweat's track "Let's Go to Bed" from his 2016 studio album Dress to Impress.

== Acting career ==
Levert began his acting career as Charles Young, his first appearance on The Jamie Foxx Show for 2 episodes with "Just Don't Do It", that aired on November 5, 1998, and Jamie disapproves of his mother (Jo Marie Payton) because she decided to marry him in the episode. In January 2001, Gerald appears again in the series finale "Always and Forever" when Jamie (Jamie Foxx) and Fancy (Garcelle Beauvais) got married and sang the opening ceremony at the wedding and joined by fellow singers Gladys Knight and Marilyn McCoo (without her husband Billy Davis Jr.). On November 10, 2003 (exactly three years prior to his death), Levert's final acting role that aired during his lifetime was when he appeared in an episode of The Parkers. He played T's father in the episode and comes for a visit to start a new band with T. In the years following his death, a stage play called, "Baby Hold On To Me" was developed for the theatre but never opened to the public.

== Death ==
On November 10, 2006, Levert was found dead in his bed at his home in Cleveland, Ohio, at age 40 Initial reports stated that Levert had died of an apparent heart attack, but the autopsy report conducted by the Cuyahoga County coroner's office concluded that Levert's death was caused by a fatal combination of prescription narcotics and over-the-counter drugs. The drugs in his bloodstream included the narcotic pain relievers Vicodin, Percocet, and Darvocet, the anxiety medication Xanax, and two over-the-counter antihistamines. The autopsy also revealed that Levert had pneumonia. The official cause of death was acute intoxication, and the death was ruled accidental. Following disclosure of Levert's cause of death, a family spokesman stated that all the drugs found in Levert's bloodstream were prescribed to the singer. Levert was taking the pain medication because of chronic pain from a lingering shoulder problem and surgery in 2005 to repair a severed Achilles tendon.

== Personal life ==
Levert dated singer Miki Howard from 1985 to 1989. In 2003, Levert had a relationship with singer Kandi Burruss. Levert had three children: LeMicah, Camryn, and Carlysia. Carlysia, an aspiring singer, appeared on the MTV series My Super Sweet 16, with her father in 2005. His father is the third cousin of Cleveland Cavaliers basketball player Caris LeVert.

Shortly before his death, Levert completed work on what would be his final album, In My Songs. The album was released on February 13, 2007. In June 2007, a book Gerald was working to complete, titled I Got Your Back: A Father and Son Keep it Real About Love, Fatherhood, Family, and Friendship, was released. The book was initially planned as a tie-in for a Levert album of the same name. I Got Your Back explores Gerald and Eddie's father/son relationship, the necessity of male bonding, and the importance of repairing fractured families. Levert was also working on a reality show in which he was losing weight along with 12 of his female fans, who were training with him at his palatial home.

== Awards and nominations ==
On December 7, 2006, it was announced that Levert, along with Chaka Khan, Yolanda Adams and Carl Thomas were nominated for a Grammy in the category of Best R&B Performance by a Duo Or Group With Vocals for their collaboration on "Everyday (Family Reunion)", a song from the soundtrack of Tyler Perry's Madea's Family Reunion. He was nominated again for the Best Traditional R&B Vocal Performance for his single, "In My Songs". At the 50th annual Grammy Awards, it was announced that Levert had won the award for "In My Songs". Levert's brother and former founding LeVert member Sean Levert accepted on his late brother's behalf. On August 17, 2013, in his hometown of Cleveland, Ohio, Gerald Levert was inducted into the 2013 class of the Rhythm and Blues Music Hall of Fame along with the O'Jays.

- American Music Award
  - 1999, Favorite R&B/Soul Band, Duo or Group (Nominated) with LSG
  - 1993, Favorite Male R&B/Soul Artist (Nominated)
  - 1988, Favorite R&B/Soul Single: "Casanova" (Nominated) with Levert
- BET Awards
  - 2007, Favorite Male R&B Artist: (Nominated)
  - 2007, BET Just Cool Like Dat: (Winner)
- Grammy Awards
  - 2008, Best Traditional R&B Performance: "In My Songs" (Winner)
  - 2007, Best R&B Performance by a Duo or Group: "Everyday (Family Reunion)" (Nominated) with Chaka Khan, Carl Thomas & Yolanda Adams
  - 1998, Best R&B Album By A Duo or Group: "Levert Sweat Gill" (Nominated) with LSG
  - 1988, Best R&B Performance by a Duo or Group: "Casanova" (Nominated) with Levert
- Image Awards
  - 2004, Outstanding Male Artist (Nominated)
  - 2008, Best Duo or Group (Winner) as Gerald Levert & Eddie Levert
- Soul Train Awards
  - 2003, Favorite Male Soul/R&B Album: The G Spot (Nominated)
  - 1999, Favorite Band, Duo or Group Album: Levert.Sweat.Gill (Nominated)
  - 1995, Favorite Male Soul/R&B Album: Groove On (Nominated)
  - 1988, Favorite Band, Duo or Group Single: "Casanova" (Winner) with Levert
  - 1988, Favorite Band, Duo or Group Album: The Big Throwdown (Winner) with Levert

== Discography ==
=== Studio albums ===
Title	Album details	Peak positions		Certifications
Title	Album details	US	US R&B	Certifications
Private Line	Released: October 15, 1991; Label: EastWest; Formats: CD	48	1	RIAA: Platinum
Groove On	Released: September 6, 1994; Label: EastWest; Formats: CD	18	2	RIAA: Platinum
Father and Son (with Eddie Levert)	Released: September 26, 1995; Label: EastWest; Formats: CD	20	2	RIAA: Gold
Love & Consequences	Released: July 21, 1998; Label: EastWest; Formats: CD	17	2	RIAA: Platinum
G	Released: March 7, 2000; Label: EastWest; Formats: CD, digital download	8	2	RIAA: Gold
Gerald's World	Released: September 18, 2001; Label: Elektra; Formats: CD, digital download	6	2	
The G Spot	Released: October 15, 2002; Label: Elektra; Formats: CD, digital download	9	2	
Stroke of Genius	Released: October 21, 2003; Label: Elektra; Formats: CD, digital download	6	1	
Do I Speak for the World	Released: November 30, 2004; Label: Elektra; Formats: CD, digital download	29	7	
In My Songs	Released: February 13, 2007; Label: Atlantic; Formats: CD, digital download	2	1	
Something to Talk About (with Eddie Levert)	Released: June 12, 2007; Label: Atlantic; Formats: CD, digital download	19	5	
"—" denotes releases that did not chart or were not released in that territory.

=== Compilations albums ===
Title	Album details	Peak positions		Certifications
Title	Album details	US	US R&B	Certifications
The Best of Gerald Levert	Released: August 31, 2010; Label: Rhino; Formats: CD, digital download	162	12	
An Introduction to: Gerald Levert	Released: June 29, 2018; Label: Rhino; Formats: CD, digital download	—	—	
Made to Love Ya	Released: March 13, 2020; Label: X5 Music; Formats: CD, digital download	—	—	
"—" denotes releases that did not chart or were not released in that territory.

=== Singles ===
Year	Single	Peak chart positions		
Year	Single	US Pop	US R&B	UK
1988	"That's What Love Is" (with Miki Howard)	―	4	―
1990	"Just One of Them Things" (with Keith Sweat)	―	―	―
1991	"Private Line"	―	1	―
1992	"Baby Hold On to Me" (with Eddie Levert)	37	1	―
1992	"School Me"	―	3	―
1992	"Can You Handle It"	―	9	―
1994	"I'd Give Anything"	28	4	―
1995	"Already Missing You" (with Eddie Levert)	75	7	―
1995	"Answering Service"	―	12	―
1995	"Can't Help Myself"	98	15	―
1995	"How Many Times"	―	55	―
1996	"Wind Beneath My Wings" (with Eddie Levert)	―	30	―
1998	"Thinkin' Bout It"	12	2	77
1998	"Taking Everything"	11	3	―
1999	"Breakin' My Heart" (featuring Sean Levert)	―	5	―
1999	"Nothin' to Somethin"	―	55	―
2000	"Baby U Are"	89	31	―
2000	"Mr. Too Damn Good"	76	20	―
2000	"Dream With No Love"	―	84	―
2001	"Made to Love Ya"	―	37	―
2001	"Make My Day" (featuring Joe Little III & Sean Levert)	―	89	―
2002	"What Makes It Good to You (No Premature Lovin')"	―	66	―
2002	"Too Much Room" (featuring Mystikal)	―	67	―
2002	"Funny"	―	37	―
2003	"Closure"	―	57	―
2003	"Wear It Out"	―	58	―
2004	"A Rose by Any Other Name" (with Teena Marie)	―	53	―
2004	"U Got That Love (Call It a Night)"	―	30	―
2004	"One Million Times"	―	56	―
2005	"So What (If You Got a Baby)"	―	49	―
2007	"In My Songs"	―	52	―
2007	"DJ Don't"	―	31	―
2010	"Can It Stay"	―	25	―
"—" denotes releases that did not chart or were not released in that territory.
