= Tevin Campbell discography =

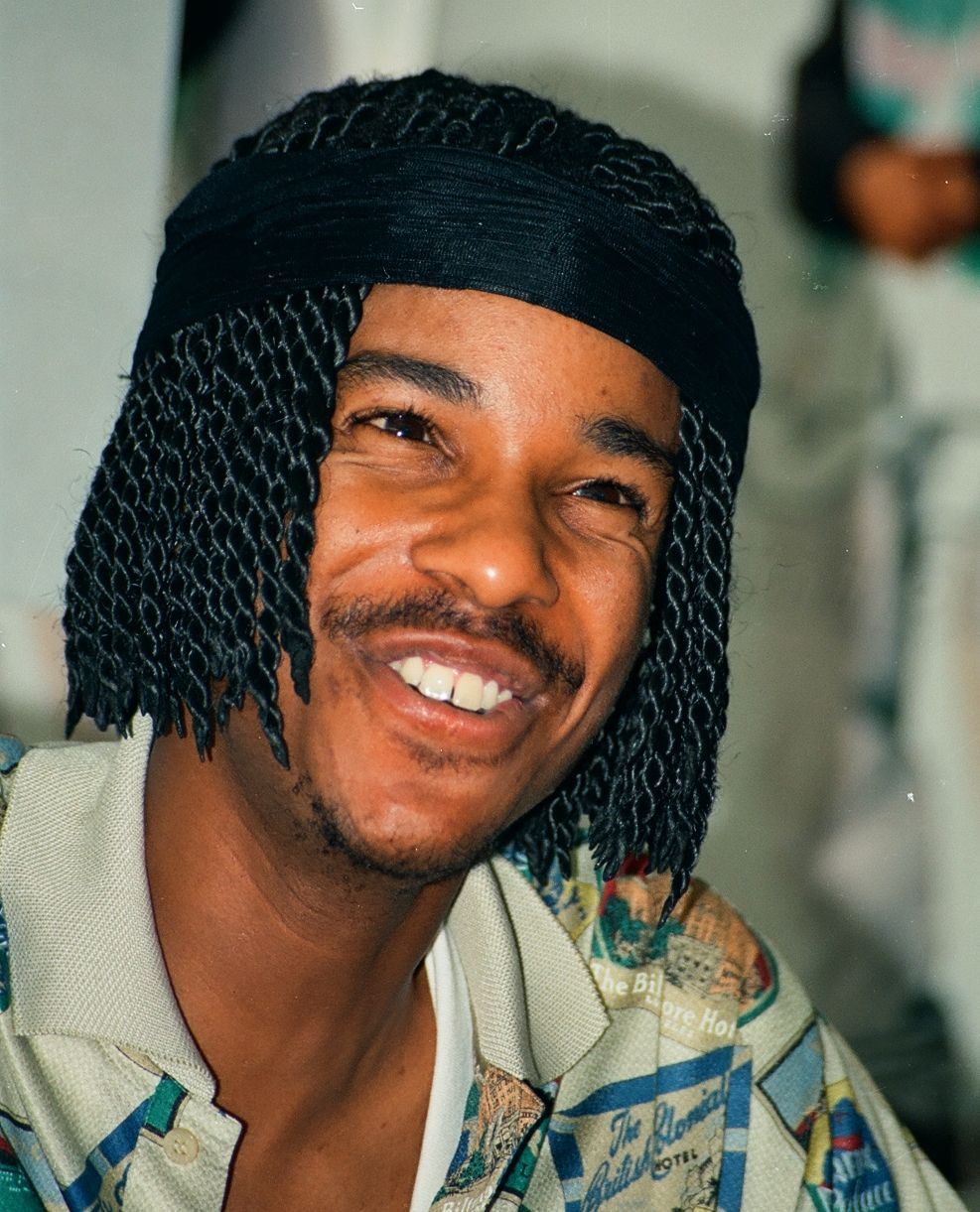
- Campbell in 1996
- Studio albums: 4
- EPs: 2
- Live albums: 1
- Compilation albums: 1
- Singles: 21

American R&B singer Tevin Campbell has released four studio albums, one compilation albums, and two extended plays. Campbell made his debut in 1989 on Quincy Jones' single "Tomorrow (A Better You, Better Me)." Released as the lead single from Jones' ensemble album Back on the Block (1989), it reached number one on Billboard's US Hot R&B/Hip-Hop Songs chart. The following year, he was recruited by Prince to record "Round and Round" for his rock musical drama Graffiti Bridge (1990), which reached number twelve on the US Billboard Hot 100 and was later certified Gold by the Recording Industry Association of America (RIAA). In 1991, he appeared with his song "Just Ask Me To," another top ten hit on the Hot R&B/Hip-Hop Songs chart, on the Boyz n the Hood soundtrack.

In November 1991, Campbell released his debut album T.E.V.I.N.. It reached number 38 on both the US Billboard Hot 100 and peaked at number five on the US Top R&B/Hip-Hop Albums, eventually reaching Platinum status in the United States. Lead single "Tell Me What You Want Me to Do" became his first top ten hit on the Billboard Hot 100 and on the New Zealand Singles Chart, peaking at six and number nine, respectively. It also marked his first song to top the R&B charts and was eventually certified Gold by the RIAA. Five further singles were released from the album, including "Goodbye" and "Alone with You," the latter of which became his second number one hit on the US Hot R&B/Hip-Hop Songs chart.

In October 1993, Qwest Records released Campbell's second album I'm Ready. Outperforming its predecessor, it opened at number 18 on the US Billboard 200 and peaked at number three on the Top R&B/Hip-Hop Albums chart, selling 1.7 million copies domestically. It was later certified 2× Platinum by the RIAA and reached Gold status in Australia. The album yielded a number of hit singles, including "Can We Talk" and "I'm Ready," both of which peaked at number nine on the US Billboard Hot 100 and enjoyed particular success throughout Oceania. With "Shhh" and "Always in My Heart," I'm Ready produced two further top ten singles on the US R&B chart.

Conceived after a period in which Campbell made fewer public appearances and focused on his private life, Back to the World, his third album, was released in June 1996. Introducing a more mature image for the singer, it was considered a commercial disappointment compared to his first two albums, peaking at number 46 on the Billboard 200 and number eleven on the Top R&B/Hip-Hop Albums chart, becoming Campbell's first effort to miss the top ten on the latter. "Back to the World," the album's lead single, became a top hit in New Zealand and reached the top 20 on the US Hot R&B/Hip-Hop Songs chart, though subsequent singles achieved less commercial success. Campbell's self-titled fourth studio album was released in February 1999. It reached number US Top R&B/Hip-Hop Albums and produced the single "Another Way," a top thirty hit in New Zealand and on the US R&B chart. In 2001, Qwest Records issued his first compilation album The Best of Tevin Campbell. It would mark his final release with the label.

== Albums ==
=== Studio albums ===
List of studio albums, with selected chart positions and certifications
Title	Album details	Peak chart positions				Certifications
Title	Album details	US	US R&B	AUS	NZ	Certifications
T.E.V.I.N.	Release date: November 15, 1991; Label: Qwest/Warner Bros.	38	5	98	31	RIAA: Platinum
I'm Ready	Release date: October 26, 1993; Label: Qwest/Warner Bros.	18	3	14	—	RIAA: 2× Platinum; ARIA: Gold
Back to the World	Release date: June 25, 1996; Label: Qwest/Warner Bros.	46	11	31	36	
Tevin Campbell	Release date: February 23, 1999; Label: Qwest/Warner Bros.	88	31	—	—	
"—" denotes a recording that did not chart or was not released in that territory.

=== Live albums ===
List of live albums
Title	Album details
Live in Concert	Released: 2013; Format: CD, DVD, Blu-ray; Label: MVD Visual

=== Compilation albums ===
List of compilation albums
Title	Album details
The Best of Tevin Campbell	Released: 1999; Label: Qwest/Warner Bros.

== Extended plays ==
List of extended plays
Title	EP details
Gift from Tevin	Released: March 25, 1994; Label: Qwest/Warner Bros.
Halls of Desire	Released: 1994; Label: Qwest/Warner Bros.

== Singles ==
=== As main artist ===
List of singles, with selected chart positions and certifications, showing year released and album name
Single	Year	Peak chart positions						Certifications	Album
Single	Year	US	US R&B	AUS	NLD	NZ	UK	Certifications	Album
"Round and Round"	1990	12	3	—	—	14	82	RIAA: Gold	Graffiti Bridge soundtrack
"Just Ask Me To" (feauring Chubb Rock)	1991	88	9	—	—	—	—		Boyz n the Hood soundtrack
"Tell Me What You Want Me to Do"	1991	6	1	116	31	9	63	RIAA: Gold	T.E.V.I.N.
"Goodbye"	1992	85	2	—	—	—	—		T.E.V.I.N.
"Strawberry Letter 23"	1992	53	40	—	—	23	—		T.E.V.I.N.
"One Song"	1992	—	—	—	—	—	—		T.E.V.I.N.
"Alone with You"	1992	72	1	—	—	—	—		T.E.V.I.N.
"Confused"	1992	—	33	—	—	—	—		T.E.V.I.N.
"Can We Talk"	1993	9	1	12	—	26	92	RIAA: Gold; ARIA: Gold; BPI: Silver	I'm Ready
"Shhh"	1993	45	8	—	—	—	—		I'm Ready
"I'm Ready"	1994	9	2	21	—	9	—	RMNZ: Gold	I'm Ready
"Always in My Heart"	1994	20	6	60	—	13	—		I'm Ready
"Don't Say Goodbye Girl"	1994	71	28	—	—	—	—		I'm Ready
"Halls of Desire"	1994	—	—	174	—	—	—		I'm Ready
"Knocks Me Off My Feet" ^{[A]}	1996	—	75	—	—	—	—		A Thin Line Between Love and Hate soundtrack
"Back to the World"	1996	47	16	31	—	8	—		Back to the World
"I Got It Bad"	1996	—	41	131	—	50	—		Back to the World
"Could You Learn to Love"	1997	—	73	—	—	38	—		Back to the World
"Another Way"	1998	100	25	184	—	28	93		Tevin Campbell
"For Your Love"	1999	—	54	—	—	—	—		Tevin Campbell
"Losing All Control"	1999	—	83	—	—	—	—		Tevin Campbell
"Safer on the Ground"	2016	—	—	—	—	—	—		Non-album single
"—" denotes a recording that did not chart or was not released in that territory.

=== As featured artist ===
List of singles, with selected chart positions, showing year released
Single	Year	Peak chart positions					Album
Single	Year	US	US R&B	NLD	NZ	UK	Album
"Tomorrow (A Better You, A Better Me)" (Quincy Jones featuring Tevin Campbell)	1990	75	1	21	22	—	Back on the Block
"U Will Know" (with BMU (Black Men United))	1994	28	5	—	3	23	Jason's Lyric soundtrack
"—" denotes a recording that did not chart or was not released in that territory.

Notes

- ^{A} Did not chart on the Hot R&B/Hip-Hop Songs chart (Billboard rules at the time prevented album cuts from charting). Chart peak listed represents the Hot R&B/Hip-Hop Airplay chart.

== Album appearances ==
Title	Year	Other artist(s)	Album
"Round and Round"	1990	—N/a	Graffiti Bridge
"Just Ask Me To"	1991	Chubb Rock	Boyz n the Hood: Music from the Motion Picture
"O Holy Night"	1992	—N/a	A Very Special Christmas 2
"I Know That My Redeemer Liveth"	1992	—N/a	Handel's Messiah: A Soulful Celebration
"Keep On Pushin'"	1994	—N/a	A Tribute to Curtis Mayfield
"Gotta Get Yo' Groove On"	1994	—N/a	A Low Down Dirty Shame: The Original Motion Picture Soundtrack
"I 2 I"	1996	—N/a	A Goofy Movie: Songs and Music from the Original Motion Picture Soundtrack
"Stand Out"	1996	—N/a	A Goofy Movie: Songs and Music from the Original Motion Picture Soundtrack
"Knocks Me Off My Feet"	1996	—N/a	A Thin Line Between Love and Hate: Music from the Motion Picture
"One Hand, One Heart"	1996	—N/a	The Songs of West Side Story
"The Impossible Dream (The Quest)"	1996	—N/a	Rhythm of the Games
"No More Fighting"	1997	—N/a	Steel
"One Kiss"	1998	Paul Anka	A Body of Work
"Everything"	1999	Quincy Jones	From Q with Love
"Overcome"	2007	Abijah	Moving 2 the Top
"The Secret Garden"	2010	Quincy Jones	Q Soul Bossa Nostra
"Let It Flow"	2014	Full Force	With Love from Our Friends
"Maybe Tomorrow"	2015	Aaron Bing	Awakening
"Kid"	2020	Miles Brown	We the Future
