= Billboard Year-End Hot R&B Singles of 1992 =

American music chart

This is a list of Billboard magazine's Top Hot R&B Singles of 1992.

No.	Title	Artist(s)
1	"Come and Talk to Me"	Jodeci
2	"Honey Love"	R. Kelly and Public Announcement
3	"You Remind Me"	Mary J. Blige
4	"End of the Road"	Boyz II Men
5	"Tell Me What You Want Me to Do"	Tevin Campbell
6	"Breakin' My Heart (Pretty Brown Eyes)"	Mint Condition
7	"Baby-Baby-Baby"	TLC
8	"Somebody Loves You Baby (You Know Who It Is)"	Patti LaBelle
9	"Tennessee"	Arrested Development
10	"Stay"	Jodeci
11	"All Woman"	Lisa Stansfield
12	"I Love Your Smile"	Shanice
13	"People Everyday"	Arrested Development
14	"Keep It Comin'"	Keith Sweat
15	"Why Me Baby?"	Keith Sweat featuring LL Cool J
16	"Uhh Ahh"	Boyz II Men
17	"Don't Be Afraid"	Aaron Hall
18	"Remember the Time"	Michael Jackson
19	"Slow Dance (Hey Mr. DJ)"	R. Kelly and Public Announcement
20	"Here I Go Again"	Glenn Jones
21	"Save the Best for Last"	Vanessa Williams
22	"Real Love"	Mary J. Blige
23	"Jump"	Kris Kross
24	"Can't Let Go"	Mariah Carey
25	"Mr. Loverman"	Shabba Ranks
26	"Ain't 2 Proud 2 Beg"	TLC
27	"Love Me"	Tracie Spencer
28	"She's Playing Hard to Get"	Hi-Five
29	"Baby Hold On to Me"	Gerald Levert and Eddie Levert
30	"Live and Learn"	Joe Public
31	"My Lovin'"	En Vogue
32	"Goodbye"	Tevin Campbell
33	"Giving Him Something He Can Feel"	En Vogue
34	"Everlasting Love"	Tony Terry
35	"Ain't Nobody Like You"	Miki Howard
36	"Right Now"	Al B. Sure!
37	"Keep On Walkin'"	CeCe Peniston
38	"Humpin' Around"	Bobby Brown
39	"Diamonds and Pearls"	Prince and the New Power Generation
40	"Alone with You"	Tevin Campbell
41	"Sweet November"	Troop
42	"Games"	Chuckii Booker
43	"Do It to Me"	Lionel Richie
44	"Love You All My Lifetime"	Chaka Khan
45	"I Could Use a Little Love (Right Now)"	Freddie Jackson
46	"She's Got That Vibe"	R. Kelly and Public Announcement
47	"Silent Prayer"	Shanice
48	"The Best Things in Life Are Free"	Luther Vandross and Janet Jackson
49	"School Me"	Gerald Levert
50	"They Want EFX"	Das EFX
51	"When You've Been Blessed (Feels Like Heaven)"	Patti LaBelle
52	"In the Closet"	Michael Jackson
53	"I've Been Searchin' (Nobody Like You)"	Glenn Jones
54	"Warm It Up"	Kris Kross
55	"Masterpiece"	Atlantic Starr
56	"Insatiable"	Prince and the New Power Generation
57	"2 Legit 2 Quit"	Hammer
58	"Give U My Heart"	Babyface featuring Toni Braxton
59	"The Comfort Zone"	Vanessa Williams
60	"It's OK"	BeBe & CeCe Winans
61	"The Rush"	Luther Vandross
62	"Black or White"	Michael Jackson
63	"My Kinda Girl"	The Rude Boys
64	"I Want You"	Jody Watley
65	"Money Can't Buy You Love"	Ralph Tresvant
66	"I Wanna Love You"	Jade
67	"What About Your Friends"	TLC
68	"The Way I Feel About You"	Karyn White
69	"After the Dance"	Fourplay featuring El DeBarge
70	"Someone to Hold"	Trey Lorenz
71	"I Got a Thang 4 Ya!"	Lo-Key?
72	"Work to Do"	Vanessa Williams
73	"Can't Have My Man"	Alyson Williams
74	"Forever in Your Eyes"	Mint Condition
75	"These Three Words"	Stevie Wonder
76	"Take Time"	Chris Walker
77	"Private Line"	Gerald Levert
78	"Please Don't Go"	Boyz II Men
79	"Helluva"	Brotherhood Creed
80	"Make It Happen"	Mariah Carey
81	"Real Love"	Lorenzo
82	"Love Crazy"	Atlantic Starr
83	"Use Me"	Men at Large
84	"You Can Make the Story Right"	Chaka Khan
85	"Jam"	Michael Jackson
86	"Just My Luck"	Alyson Williams
87	"Sometimes It's Only Love"	Luther Vandross
88	"The Way Love Goes"	Brian McKnight
89	"They Reminisce Over You (T.R.O.Y.)"	Pete Rock & CL Smooth
90	"Can He Do It (Like This, Can He Do It Like That)"	Ready for the World
91	"I'm Still Waiting"	Jodeci
92	"Kickin' It"	After 7
93	"I'm Still in Love with You"	Meli'sa Morgan
94	"Never Satisfied"	Good 2 Go
95	"Rump Shaker"	Wreckx-n-Effect
96	"Kiss You Back"	Digital Underground
97	"I Miss You"	Joe Public
98	"Jump Around"	House of Pain
99	"I'll Take You There"	BeBe & CeCe Winans featuring Mavis Staples
100	"Put Me in Your Mix"	Barry White

== See also ==
- 1992 in music
- Billboard Year-End Hot 100 singles of 1992
- Billboard Year-End Hot Rap Singles of 1992
- List of Hot R&B Singles number ones of 1992
