= The Best of Tevin Campbell =

Greatest hits album by Tevin Campbell
- Released: 1999
- Recorded: 1989–1999
- Genre: R&B
- Length: 67:20
- Label: Qwest
- Producer: Various

Tevin Campbell chronology
Tevin Campbell (1999)	The Best of Tevin Campbell (1999)	Live in Concert (2013)

Professional ratings
Review scores
Source	Rating
Allmusic	3/5 stars

The Best of Tevin Campbell is a greatest hits album for R&B singer Tevin Campbell, released in 1999 by Qwest Records.

== Track listing ==
1. Can We Talk – 4:44
2. I'm Ready – 4:45
3. Shhh – 4:54
4. Always in My Heart – 5:38
5. Back to the World – 4:59
6. Could You Learn to Love – 4:08
7. Goodbye – 4:16
8. Round and Round (Soul Mix Edit) – 4:54
9. Tell Me What You Want Me to Do – 5:02
10. One Song – 4:25
11. Another Way – 4:54
12. Don't Say Goodbye Girl – 4:30
13. What Do I Say – 4:55
14. Brown Eyed Girl – 4:01
15. Tell Me Where – 4:28
