= Q Soul Bossa Nostra =

Q: Soul Bossa Nostra

Studio album by Quincy Jones
- Released: November 9, 2010
- Recorded: 2009–2010
- Genre: Hip hop, R&B
- Label: Qwest, Interscope
- Producer: Quincy Jones (exec.), Adam Fell (co-exec.); Ray Brown; Phil Ramone; Aliaune "Akon" Thiam; Giorgio Tuinfort; Roger Thomas; Kevin Deane; Simuel Stevenson; David Banner; Warryn Campbell; Wild Animals; Scott Storch; Terrace Martin; Jermaine Dupri; Q-Tip; Mervyn Warren; Wyclef Jean; Jerry "Wonda" Duplessis; T-Pain; Mark Ronson; DJ Paul; Juicy J; RedOne

Quincy Jones chronology
The Original Jam Sessions 1969 (2004)	Q: Soul Bossa Nostra (2010)

Professional ratings
Review scores
Source	Rating
Los Angeles Times	2.5/4 stars
USA Today	3/4 stars

Q: Soul Bossa Nostra is a studio album by Quincy Jones, recorded in 2010 with various artists. The album was released on November 9, 2010, and was Jones's final album. The title of the album refers to Jones's 1962 instrumental track "Soul Bossa Nova".

== Background ==
Recorded as a tribute to Jones, and featuring re-interpretations of songs associated with him, it was Jones's first original album since 1995's Q's Jook Joint. Jones served as executive producer.

In a press release announcing the album Jones stated, "Each artist picked a song that resonated with them for different reasons. I am honored that everyone wanted to be a part of this celebration of these songs. They all made them their own and knocked them out of the park." Years later, he told an interviewer for New York "I was not in favor of doing it, but the rappers wanted to record something as a tribute to me, where they'd do versions of songs that I’d done over my career. I said to them, "Look, you got to make the music better than we did on the originals." That didn't happen. T-Pain, man, he didn't pay attention to the details."

== Track listing ==
Credits adapted from the album's liner notes.

No.	Title	Writer(s)	Producer(s)	Length
1.	"Ironside" (featuring Talib Kweli)	Quincy Jones	Quincy Jones; Ray Brown; Phil Ramone	3:54
2.	"Strawberry Letter 23" (featuring Akon)	Shuggie Otis	Aliaune "Akon" Thiam; Giorgio Tuinfort	3:53
3.	"Soul Bossa Nostra" (featuring Ludacris, Naturally 7, and Rudy Currence)	Jones; Ludacris^{[a]}; Jarrett Johnson^{[a]}; Rudy Currence^{[a]}	Roger Thomas; Kevin Deane; Simuel Stevenson; Joshua "Igloo" Monroy^{[b]}	4:08
4.	"Give Me the Night" (featuring Jamie Foxx)	Rod Temperton	David Banner; Warryn Campbell; Eric Dawkins^{[c]}	3:44
5.	"Tomorrow" (featuring John Legend)	Siedah Garrett; George Johnson; Louis Johnson	Wild Animals; Jones	4:32
6.	"You Put a Move on My Heart" (featuring Jennifer Hudson)	Temperton	Scott Storch; Jones; Harvey Mason Jr.^{[c]}	4:59
7.	"Get the Funk Out of My Face" (featuring Snoop Dogg)	Jones; G. Johnson; L. Johnson	Terrace Martin; Jones	3:11
8.	"Secret Garden" (featuring Usher, Robin Thicke, Tyrese Gibson, LL Cool J, Tevin Campbell, and Barry White)	Jones; Garrett; Temperton; El DeBarge	Jermaine Dupri; Jones; LRoc^{[b]}	5:53
9.	"Betcha Wouldn't Hurt Me" (featuring Mary J. Blige, Q-Tip and Alfredo Rodríguez)	Stephanie Andrews; Stevie Wonder	Q-Tip; Jones	7:05
10.	"Everything Must Change" (featuring BeBe Winans)	Bernard Ighner	Mervyn Warren	5:24
11.	"Many Rains Ago (Oluwa)" (featuring Wyclef Jean)	Jones; Caiphus Semenya	Wyclef Jean; Jerry "Wonda" Duplessis	4:57
12.	"P.Y.T. (Pretty Young Thing)" (featuring T-Pain and Robin Thicke)	Jones; James Ingram	T-Pain; Warren^{[d]}	4:06
13.	"It's My Party" (featuring Amy Winehouse)	John Gluck; Wally Gold; Seymour Gottlieb; Herbert Weiner	Mark Ronson; Jon Moon^{[c]}	2:36
14.	"Hikky-Burr" (featuring Three 6 Mafia and David Banner)	Jones; Bill Cosby	DJ Paul; Juicy J	2:55
15.	"Sanford and Son" (featuring T.I., B.o.B, Prince Charlez and Mohombi)	Jones; RedOne^{[e]}; Johnny "JSev" Severin^{[e]}; JAYLIEN^{[e]}	RedOne; Jones; JAYLIEN	4:08

Notes

- ^{^[a]} signifies an additional lyricist
- ^{^[b]} signifies a co-producer
- ^{^[c]} signifies a vocal producer
- ^{^[d]} signifies additional production
- ^{^[e]} signifies new interpretation credits

== Personnel ==
Musicians

- Quincy Jones – musical arrangements (1, 3, 5, 9)
- Maxi Anderson – children's choir director and arranger (5)
- Arden "Keyz" Altino – keyboards (11)
- Victor Axelrod – piano (13)
- David Banner – all instruments, music programming, intro rap vocals (4)
- Jacqueline Brand – strings played by (10)
- Thomas Brenneck – guitars, vibraphone (13)
- Asia Bryant – additional background vocals (3)
- Warryn Campbell – all instruments, music programming (4)
- Erick Coomes – bass guitar, rhythm guitar (5)
- Tyler Coomes – additional percussion (5)
- Rudy Currence – additional rap vocals (3)
- Mario DeLeon – strings played by (10)
- Chelsea Diblasi – children's choir (5)
- Tori Diblasi – children's choir (5)
- Bruce Dukov – concertmaster, strings played by (10)
- David Ewart – strings played by (10)
- Jamie Foxx – lead and background vocals (4)
- Cochemea Gastelum – tenor saxophone (13)
- Latonya "Tone" Givens – background vocals (7)
- Andrew Gouche – bass guitar (7)
- Andrew Greene – trumpet (13)
- Sebastian Guerrero – children's choir (5)
- Dave Guy – trumpet (13)
- Reggie Hamilton – bass guitar (10)
- Tavia Ivey – background vocals (6)
- Paul Jackson Jr. – guitar (10, 12)
- Evyn Johnson – children's choir (5)
- Justin "Kanobby" Keitt – Rhodes and auxiliary keyboards (5)
- Trevor Lawrence Jr. – percussion (7)
- Brody Lee – children's choir (5)
- Cody Lee – children's choir (5)
- Natalie Leggett – strings played by (10)
- Alana Linsey – children's choir (5)
- Vanessa Marquez – background vocals (4)
- Terrace Martin – drums, alto saxophone, keyboards, additional vocals (7)
- Elsie Moon – children's choir (5)
- Nick Movshon – bass guitar (13)
- Naturally 7 – background vocals, musical arrangements (3)
- Ade Omotayo – background vocals (13)
- Katia Popov – strings (10)
- Ryan Porter – trombone (7)
- Prince Charlez – background vocals (15)
- Alfredo Rodríguez – piano solo (9)
- Kendra Ross – background vocals (1)
- Homer Steinweiss – drums (13)
- Neal Sugarman – tenor saxophone (13)
- Jared Tankel – baritone saxophone (13)
- Alex Teamer – drum programming, additional keyboards (10)
- Rod Temperton – arranger (5)
- Aliaune "Akon" Thiam – vocals, musical arrangements (2)
- Zalon Thompson – background vocals (13)
- JoAnne Tominaga – vocal contractor (5)
- Giorgio Tuinfort – musical arrangements, additional music programming (2)
- Mervyn Warren – musical arrangements, keyboards, percussion, string arrangements, strings conducted by, background vocals (10)
- Kamasi Washington – tenor saxophone (7)
- Jasmine Watkins – children's choir (5)
- Sierra Watson – children's choir (5)
- Billy Wes – hook vocals (14)
- Don Williams – vibraphone, congas (5)
- Marlon Williams – guitar, additional vocals (7)
- Dontae Winslow – trumpet (7)
- Stevie Wonder – musical arrangements (9)

Technical personnel

- Wayne "The Brain" Allison – engineer (6)
- Elvis Aponte – assistant engineer (11)
- Mike "The Manual" Ault – engineer (5)
- Steven Barlow – assistant engineer (8)
- David Boyd – assistant engineer (6)
- Thomas Brenneck – engineer (13)
- Bruce Buechner – engineer and mixing (4)
- Warryn Campbell – engineer and mixing (4)
- Vadim "Chess" Chislov – assistant engineer (6)
- Dave Class – engineer (11)
- Aaron Dahl – engineer (7)
- Michael Daley – assistant engineer (6)
- Kevin "KD" Davis – mixing (6)
- Mike Dean – mixing (5)
- "Angry" Mike Eleopoulos – vocal engineer for Ludacris (3)
- Tom Elmhirst – mixing (13)
- Michael "Crazy Mike" Foster – engineer (14)
- Angela N. Golightly – production coordination (6)
- Mark "Exit" Goodchild – engineer and mixing (2)
- Bernie Grundman – mastering
- Josh Gudwin – mixing (1, 12); vocal engineer for Usher, LL Cool J, and Tevin Campbell (8), additional engineering (12)
- Dabling Harward – additional engineering (6)
- Brian Herman – engineer (1)
- Andrew Hey – vocal engineer (6)
- Willard Hill – assistant engineer (11)
- Mitch Kenny – assistant engineer (3)
- Andrew Lefkowits – Pro Tools editing (3)
- Damien Lewis – mix assistant (8)
- Bill Malina – vocal engineer for Robin Thicke (8, 12)
- Terrace Martin – mixing (7)
- Harvey Mason Jr. – vocal engineer for Tyrese (8)
- Vaughan Merrick – engineer (13)
- LT-mOE – vocal engineer for Rudy Currence (3)
- Jon Moon – engineer (13)
- Robert Orton – mixing (15)
- Charlie Paakkari – 2nd engineer (10)
- Dan Parry – assistant engineer (13)
- DJ Paul – mixing (14)
- BJ Ramone – assistant engineer (6)
- Phil Ramone – original engineer (1)
- John Rivers – assistant engineer (6)
- Mark Ronson – engineer (13)
- Darren Rust – engineer and mixing (3)
- Alexis Seton – engineer (7)
- Johnny Severin – engineer (15)
- Trevor Shanks – assistant engineer (2)
- Ivy Skoff – production coordination (10)
- Tony Shepperd – engineer and mixing (10)
- Phil Tan – mixing (8)
- Serge "Surgical" Tsai – engineer and mixing (11)
- Tanner Underwood – assistant engineer (4)
- Javier Valverde – engineer (12)
- Alonzo Vargas – assistant engineer (11)
- Blair Wells – engineer (9)
- Zoe A. Young – production coordination (6)
