= List of Hot R&B Singles number ones of 1992 =

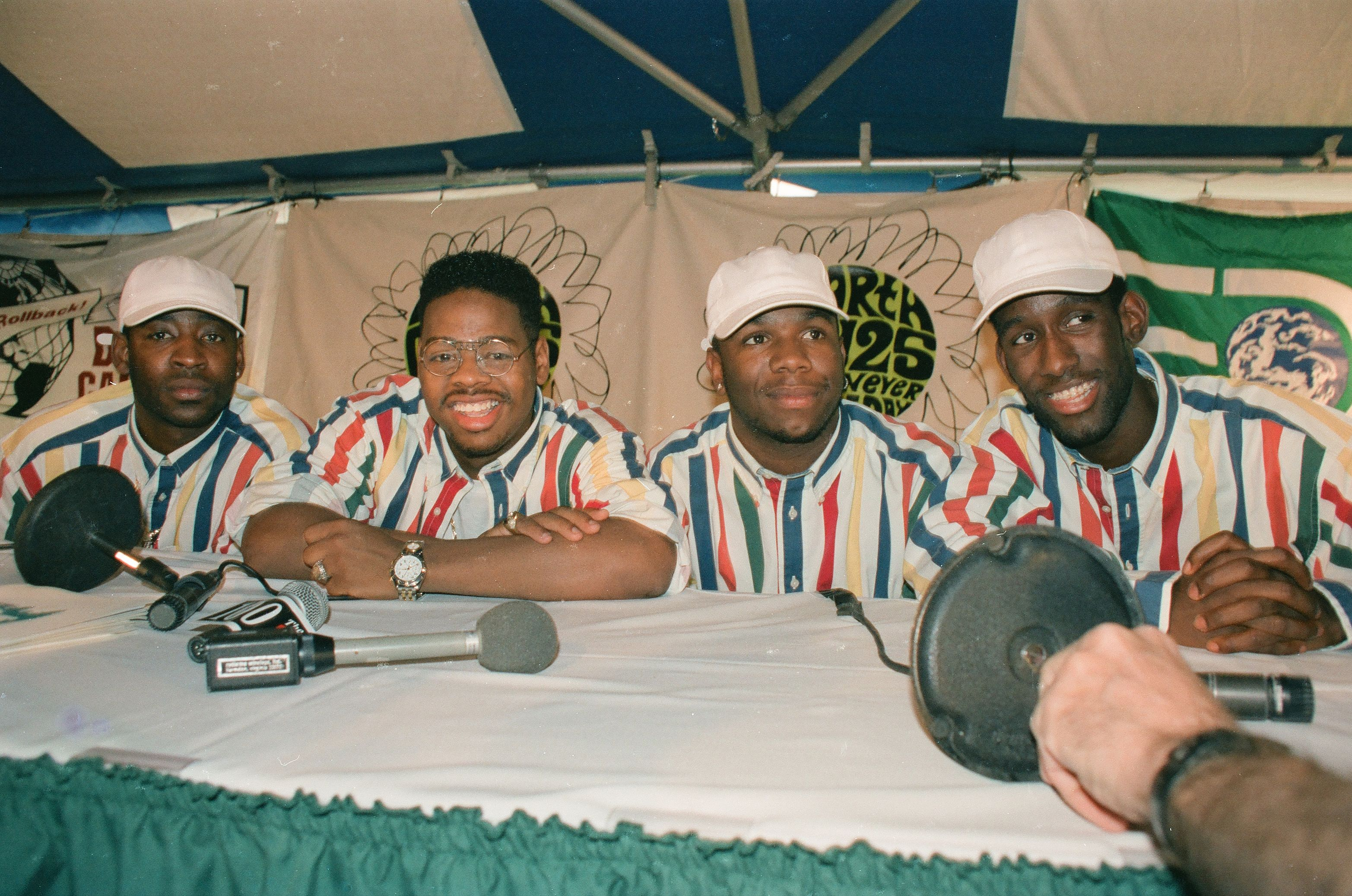
Boyz II Men (pictured in 1995) had two number ones in 1992.

Billboard published a weekly chart in 1992 ranking the top-performing singles in the United States in African American-oriented genres; the chart has undergone various name changes over the decades to reflect the evolution of black music and has been published as Hot R&B/Hip-Hop Songs since 2005. In 1992, it was published under the title Hot R&B Singles, and 33 different singles reached number one.

In the issue of Billboard dated January 4, Shanice was at number one with "I Love Your Smile", the song's third week in the top spot. Two weeks later, it was replaced by "Tell Me What You Want Me to Do", the first solo chart-topper for Tevin Campbell, who was aged 15 at the time; he had previously spent time at number one as the featured vocalist on a track by the producer Quincy Jones. It the second time that a 15-year-old singer had topped the chart in the space of two months, following Tracie Spencer the previous November. Campbell returned to number one later in the year with "Alone with You" and was one of seven artists to have two number ones during the year, along with Mary J. Blige, Boyz II Men, En Vogue, Michael Jackson, Jodeci, and R. Kelly and Public Announcement. No act achieved more than two number one singles on the R&B chart in 1992. Boyz II Men's "End of the Road" and Whitney Houston's "I Will Always Love You" both spent four weeks at number one during 1992, the most by any song during the calendar year, but Houston's single would extend its run by a further seven weeks the following year, making it the longest-running number one since Billboard merged its previously separate R&B sales and airplay charts in 1958. Boyz II Men's total of five weeks at number one during 1992 was the most by any act.

A number of acts topped the chart for the first time in 1992. "Here I Go Again" was the first number one for Glenn Jones, more than nine years after he first entered the chart. It was replaced by "Don't Be Afraid", the first chart-topper for Aaron Hall, formerly of the group Guy. Later in the year, R. Kelly and Public Announcement, Arrested Development, TLC, Mary J. Blige, and Lo-Key? all reached number one for the first time. Kelly would go on to become one of the best-selling artists of all time, with reported sales of up to 75 million records, before his career came to an end following his conviction and imprisonment on federal racketeering and sex trafficking charges. TLC would become the best-selling American girl group of all time, with sales of over 65 million. Blige would also go on to great success, being dubbed the "Queen of Hip-Hop Soul" and credited with creating "the blueprint for nineties hip-hop and R&B". Three of 1992's R&B number ones also topped Billboard's pop chart, the Hot 100, and two of them set a new record for the longest run atop that listing. "End of the Road" spent 13 weeks at number one on the Hot 100, a new record which was broken in 1993 by "I Will Always Love You", which spent one more week in the peak position. "Save the Best For Last" by Vanessa Williams also reached number one on both charts.

== Chart history ==
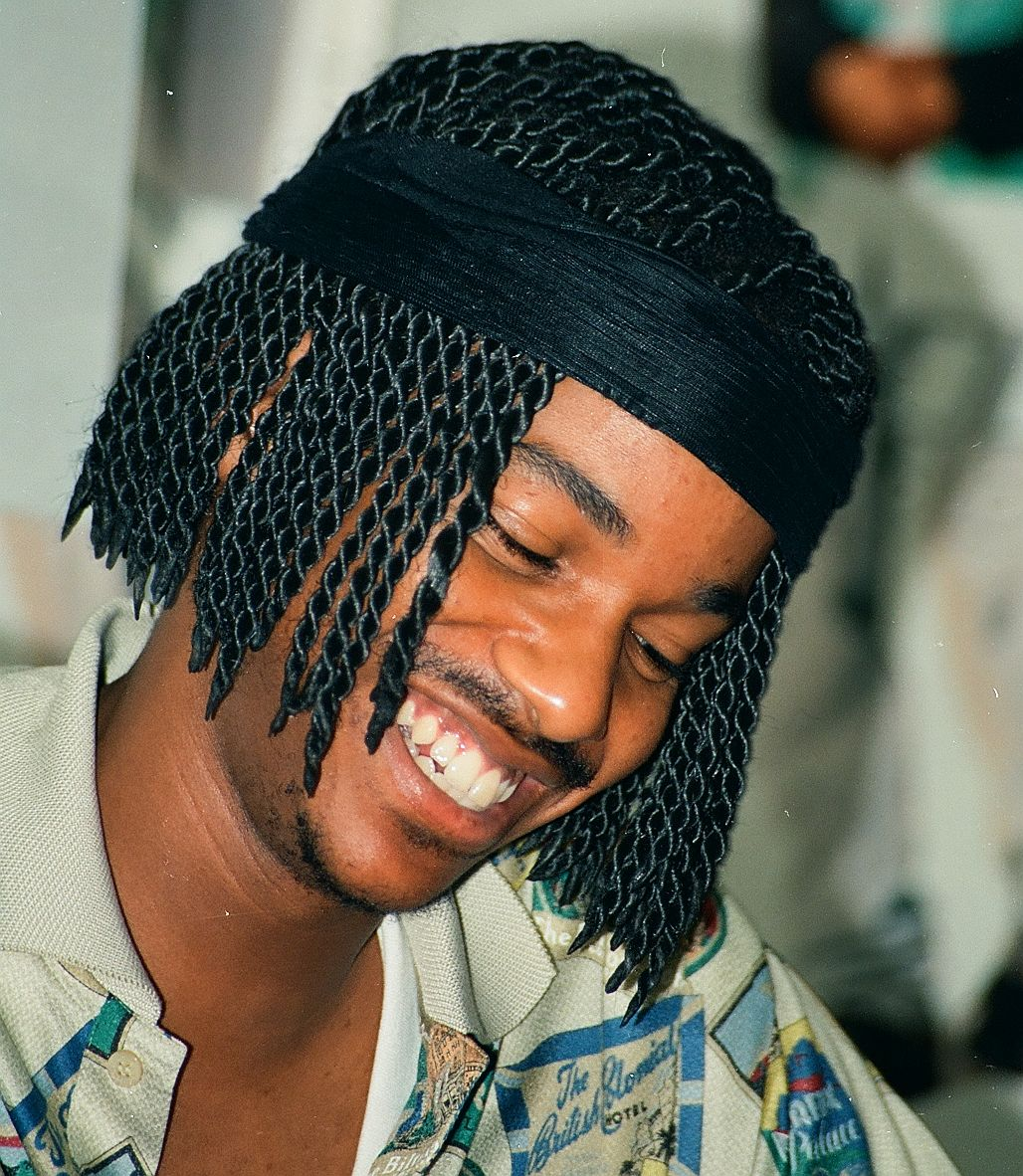
Teenaged singer Tevin Campbell (pictured in 1996) had two number ones in 1992.

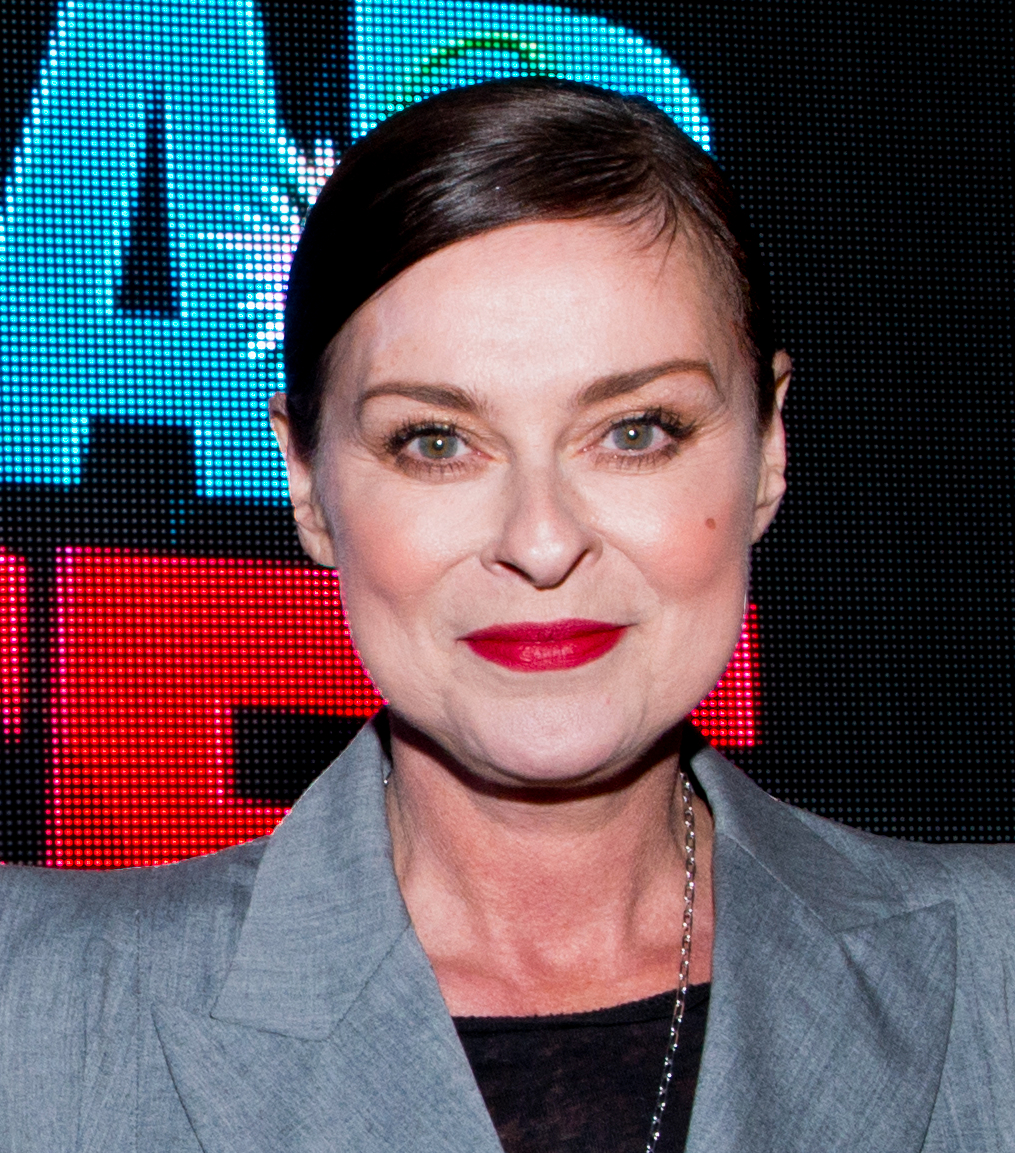
"All Woman" was a chart-topper for British singer Lisa Stansfield (pictured in 2014).

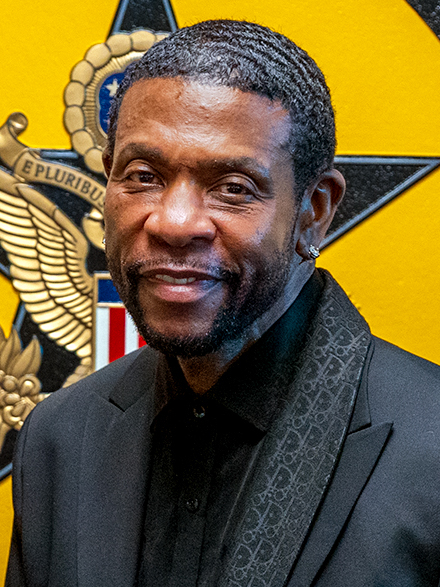
Keith Sweat (pictured in 2023) spent two weeks at number one with "Keep It Comin'".

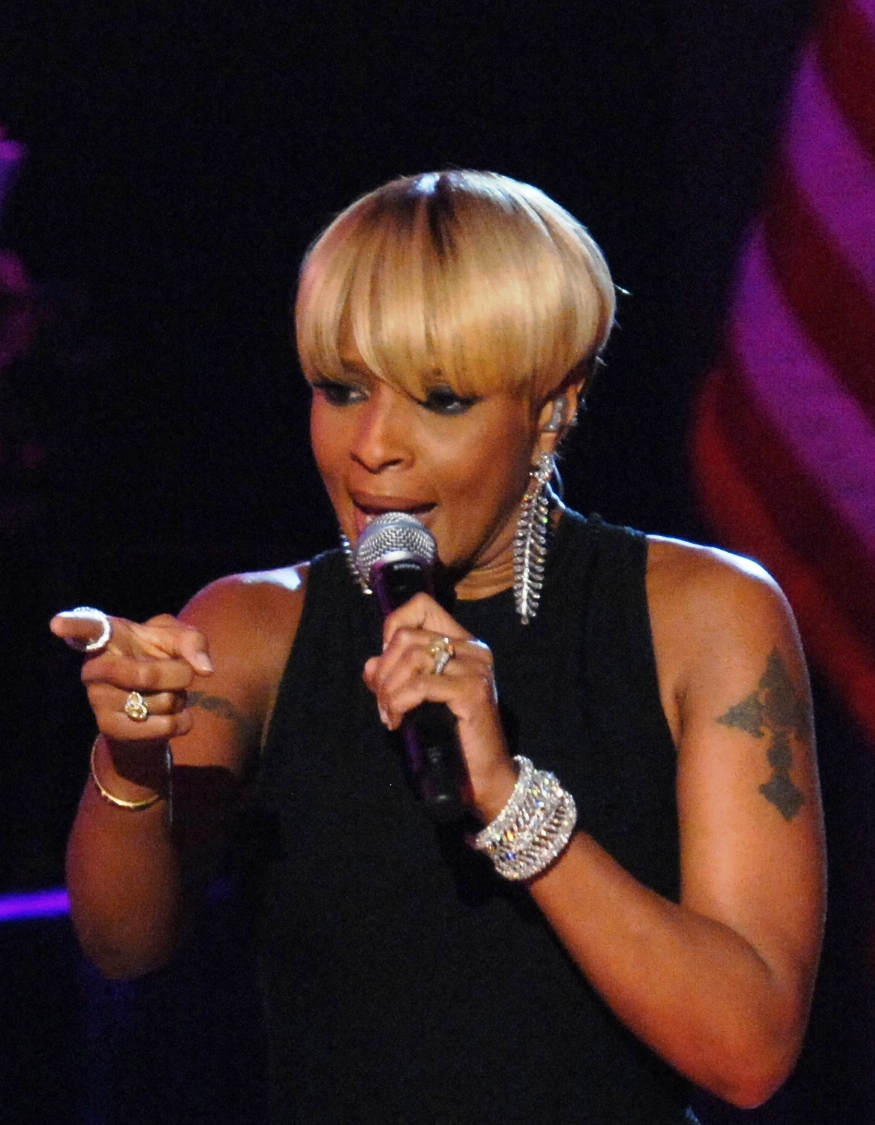
Mary J. Blige (pictured in 2009) gained her first number one with "You Remind Me".

Key
†	Indicates number 1 on Billboard's year-end R&B singles chart

Chart history
Issue date	Title	Artist(s)	Ref.
January 4	"I Love Your Smile"	Shanice	
January 11	"I Love Your Smile"	Shanice	
January 18	"Tell Me What You Want Me to Do"	Tevin Campbell	
January 25	"Keep It Comin'"	Keith Sweat	
February 1	"Keep It Comin'"	Keith Sweat	
February 8	"Stay"	Jodeci	
February 15	"Stay"	Jodeci	
February 22	"Uhh Ahh"	Boyz II Men	
February 29	"Baby Hold On to Me"	Gerald Levert with Eddie Levert	
March 7	"Remember the Time"	Michael Jackson	
March 14	"Remember the Time"	Michael Jackson	
March 21	"Diamonds and Pearls"	Prince and the NPG	
March 28	"Save the Best for Last"	Vanessa Williams	
April 4	"Save the Best for Last"	Vanessa Williams	
April 11	"Save the Best for Last"	Vanessa Williams	
April 18	"Here I Go Again"	Glenn Jones	
April 25	"Don't Be Afraid"	Aaron Hall	
May 2	"Don't Be Afraid"	Aaron Hall	
May 9	"All Woman"	Lisa Stansfield	
May 16	"My Lovin' (You're Never Gonna Get It)"	En Vogue	
May 23	"My Lovin' (You're Never Gonna Get It)"	En Vogue	
May 30	"Come and Talk to Me" †	Jodeci	
June 6	"Come and Talk to Me" †	Jodeci	
June 13	"Honey Love"	R. Kelly and Public Announcement	
June 20	"Honey Love"	R. Kelly and Public Announcement	
June 27	"In the Closet"	Michael Jackson	
July 4	"Do It to Me"	Lionel Richie	
July 11	"Tennessee"	Arrested Development	
July 18	"The Best Things in Life Are Free"	Luther Vandross and Janet Jackson with BBD and Ralph Tresvant	
July 25	"You Remind Me"	Mary J. Blige	
August 1	"Giving Him Something He Can Feel"	En Vogue	
August 8	"Baby-Baby-Baby"	TLC	
August 15	"Baby-Baby-Baby"	TLC	
August 22	"End of the Road"	Boyz II Men	
August 29	"End of the Road"	Boyz II Men	
September 5	"End of the Road"	Boyz II Men	
September 12	"End of the Road"	Boyz II Men	
September 19	"Humpin' Around"	Bobby Brown	
September 26	"Humpin' Around"	Bobby Brown	
October 3	"Slow Dance (Hey Mr. DJ)"	R. Kelly and Public Announcement	
October 10	"Alone with You"	Tevin Campbell	
October 17	"Real Love"	Mary J. Blige	
October 24	"Real Love"	Mary J. Blige	
October 31	"Right Now"	Al B. Sure!	
November 7	"Sweet November"	Troop	
November 14	"Ain't Nobody Like You"	Miki Howard	
November 21	"Games"	Chuckii Booker	
November 28^{[a]}	"I Got a Thang 4 Ya!"	Lo-Key?	
December 5	"I Will Always Love You"	Whitney Houston	
December 12	"I Will Always Love You"	Whitney Houston	
December 19	"I Will Always Love You"	Whitney Houston	
December 26	"I Will Always Love You"	Whitney Houston	

=== Notes ===
a. As of 2024, Billboard's website shows the number one for this week as "If I Ever Fall in Love" by Shai, but this does not match what was printed in the magazine in 1992.

== See also ==
- 1992 in music
- Billboard Year-End Hot R&B Singles of 1992
- List of Billboard number-one R&B albums of 1992
