= Tevin Campbell (album) =

Studio album by Tevin Campbell
- Released: February 23, 1999
- Genre: R&B
- Length: 59:57
- Label: Qwest; Warner Bros.
- Producer: Tevin Campbell; Stevie J; Wyclef Jean; Marc Kinchen; Daryl Simmons; Narada Michael Walden

Tevin Campbell chronology
Back to the World (1996)	Tevin Campbell (1999)	The Best of Tevin Campbell (1999)

Singles from Tevin Campbell
- 1. "Another Way" Released: December 1, 1998; 2. "For Your Love" Released: April 16, 1999; 3. "Losing All Control" Released: August 10, 1999

Tevin Campbell is the fourth studio album by the American R&B singer Tevin Campbell. It was released by Qwest Records and Warner Bros. on February 23, 1999. The album features production from Stevie J, Wyclef Jean, and others. Campbell released three singles, having only one of them chart on the US Billboard Hot 100, "Another Way". The other two singles are "Losing All Control" and "For Your Love", both with minor showings on the R&B charts.

== Background ==
In June 1996, Campbell released his third studio album Back to the World. His first project in three years, a period marked by fewer public appearances and a focus on his private life, the album failed to match the commercial success of its two predecessors, T.E.V.I.N. (1991) and I'm Ready (1993), reaching number 46 on the US Billboard 200 and number eleven on the Top R&B/Hip-Hop Albums chart only. His first effort to neither reach Gold or Platinum status in the United States, it produced three singles, including its lead single, the album's title track, whoch became a top ten hit in New Zealand, and a top 20 entry on the US Hot R&B/Hip-Hop Songs chart. Subsequent singles such as "I Got It Bad" and "Could You Learn to Love" charted significantly lower, however.

== Promotion ==
Tevin Campbell was preceded by the release of its lead single, Marc Kinchen-produced "Another Way," issued on December 1, 1998. The album highest-charting single, it reached number 100 on the US Billboard Hot 100 and number 25 on the US Hot R&B/Hip-Hop Songs chart. The song also charted in Australia and the United Kingdom, and it became another top 30 hit in New Zealand for Campbell. "For Your Love" and "Losing All Control," both produced by Stevie J, were released by Qwest Records as the album's second and third single in April and August 1999, respectively, but reached the lower half of the Hot R&B/Hip-Hop Songs chart only.

Promotion for the album was largely suspended after Campbell was arrested in July 1999 in Van Nuys, California, for soliciting a lewd act from an undercover police officer during a sting operation. The operation was reportedly conducted in an area where there had been numerous complaints from the public about cruising and solicitation, with Campbell also being in possession of a small amount of marijuana at the time of his arrest. In November 1999, the singer was sentenced to attend Narcotics Anonymous as well as an AIDS awareness class after pleading no contest.

== Critical reception ==
Professional ratings
Review scores
Source	Rating
AllMusic	3/5 stars
Entertainment Weekly	B+

AllMusic editor Tim Sheridan wrote: "Dig the slow jams: This young R&B singer kicks out some easy beats and infectious hooks with the help from the likes of Wyclef Jean, Quincy Jones, and Stevie J [...] Granted, some of the material doesn't rise above the standard vocal grandstanding, but there are signs of great things to come." Cheo Tyehimba, writing for Entertainment Weekly, found that "Campbell’s fourth effort is pure R&B: spare and sensitive. One or two songs fall short, but Tevin Campbell is anchored with jams like the pulsing 'Another Way' and the Wyclef Jean-produced 'Never Again'."

Billboard called the album a "return to form" and concluded: "From this Quincy Jones protégé, who embodies the romantic side of his mentor's musicality, an album for the R&B mainstream with crossover potential at AC and lite jazz." Vibe editor Larry Flick wrote that "the good news is that Campbell has evolved into an assured (and yes, remarkably mature) stylist, capable of rising above the familiar formulas of his producers and giving their material a much-needed fresh spin [...] Perhaps most appealing about Tevin Campbell is the artist's ability to quietly breathe volumes of emotional subtext into a lyric [...] At a time when many of his R&B colleagues equate soul with shriek, Campbell's subtle phrasing and intimate demeanor are ultimately more inviting and will render his recordings far more durable."

== Chart performance ==
In the United States, Tevin Campbell debuted and peaked at number 88 on the Billboard 200. It marked Campbell's lowest opening up to then and was another considerable decline after the lackluster success of his previous effort Back to the World (1996). On the Top R&B/Hip-Hop Albums chart, it reached number 31. Elsewhere, Tevin Campbell reached number 35 on the UK Hip Hop and R&B Albums Charts.

== Track listing ==
Tevin Campbell track listing
No.	Title	Writer(s)	Producer(s)	Length
1.	"Another Way"	Teddy "Sonny Boy" Turpin; Terrell Carter; Marc Kinchen	Kinchen	4:55
2.	"Never Again"	Tevin Campbell; Wyclef Jean; Janice Robinson; Jerry Wonda	Jean; Wonda	3:44
3.	"Since I Lost You"	Sally Jo Dakota; James Fischer; Narada Michael Walden; James Taylor	Walden	4:37
4.	"For Your Love"	Gordon Chambers; Steven A. Jordan	Stevie J	6:28
5.	"The Only One for Me (Don't Wanna Play)"	Campbell; Faith Evans; Kinchen; Mike Mason	Kinchen	6:03
6.	"My Love Ain't Blind"	Jordan; Turpin	Stevie J	4:37
7.	"Everything You Are" (featuring Coko)	Joey Diggs; David Foster; Wil Wheaton, Jr.; Suzette Charles; Nita Whitaker; Warren Wiebe	Daryl Simmons	4:48
8.	"Dandelion"	Jordan; Turpin	Stevie J	6:28
9.	"Losing All Control"	Campbell; Jordan; Turpin	Stevie J	4:34
10.	"Don't Throw Your Life Away"	Walden; Campbell; Dakota	Walden	5:18
11.	"Just Begun to Grow"	Campbell	Campbell	2:18
12.	"Siempre Estaras En Mi (Dandelion)"	Jordan; Turpin	Stevie J	6:18
Total length:				59:57

Japanese bonus track
No.	Title	Writer(s)	Producer(s)	Length
13.	"Everything"	Antonina Armato; Andy Hill	Quincy Jones	4:08

== Charts ==
Weekly chart performance for Tevin Campbell
Chart (1999)	Peak position
UK R&B Albums (OCC)	34
US Billboard 200	88
US Top R&B/Hip-Hop Albums (Billboard)	31

== Release history ==
Tevin Campbell release history
Region	Date	Format	Label	Ref(s)
United States	February 23, 1999	CD; cassette; download	Qwest; Warner Bros.	
Japan	February 24, 1999	CD; cassette; download	Qwest; Warner Bros.	
