= Graffiti Bridge =

Graffiti Bridge may refer to:

- Graffiti Bridge (film), a 1990 American rock musical drama film written by, directed by, and starring Prince
- Graffiti Bridge (album), the soundtrack album
