= Another Way (Tevin Campbell song) =

Single by Tevin Campbell

from the album Tevin Campbell
- Released: February 23, 1999
- Length: 4:55
- Label: Qwest
- Songwriter(s): Teddy "Sonny Boy" Turpin; Terrell Carter; Marc Kinchen
- Producer(s): Marc Kinchen

Tevin Campbell singles chronology
"Could You Learn to Love" (1997)	"Another Way" (1999)	"For Your Love" (1999)

"Another Way" is a song by American R&B singer Tevin Campbell. It was written by Teddy "Sonny Boy" Turpin, Terrell Carter, and Marc Kinchen for his self-titled fourth studio album (1999) with production helmed by the latter. Released as the album's lead single, the song reached the top thirty of the New Zealand Singles Chart, peaking at number 28. It was the only single from Tevin Campbell to reach the US Billboard Hot 100, peaking at number 100. "Another Way" had more success on the Billboard R&B chart, where it peaked at number 25.

== Music video ==
An accompanying music video for "Another Way" was filmed by director Darren Grant in Los Angeles, California during the week of October 31, 1998.

== Track listings ==
CD single
No.	Title	Producer(s)	Length
1.	"Another Way" (Album Edit)	Kinchen	4:00
2.	"Another Way" (Instrumental)	Kinchen	4:54

CD maxi-single
No.	Title	Producer(s)	Length
1.	"Another Way" (Darkchild Remix Without Rap)	Kinchen; Rodney "Darkchild" Jerkins^{[a]}	3:39
2.	"Another Way" (Darkchild Remix Featuring Saafir Rap)	Kinchen; Jerkins^{[a]}	4:20
3.	"Another Way" (Album Edit)	Kinchen	4:00

Notes

- ^{^[a]} denotes additional producer

== Credits and personnel ==
Credits lifted from the liner notes of Tevin Campbell.

- Jay Brown – executive producer
- Tevin Campbell – executive producer, vocals
- Terrell Carter – arranger
- Stevie J – executive producer
- Quincy Jones – executive producer
- Marc Kinchen – lyrics, producer
- Marc D. Persaud – co-executive producer

== Charts ==
Chart (1999)	Peak position
Australia (ARIA)	184
New Zealand (Recorded Music NZ)	28
UK Singles (OCC)	93
UK Hip Hop/R&B (OCC)	11
US Billboard Hot 100	100
US Hot R&B/Hip-Hop Songs (Billboard)	25
