= Boyz n the Hood (soundtrack) =

Boyz n the Hood: Music from the Motion Picture

Soundtrack album by various artists
- Released: July 9, 1991
- Recorded: 1990–1991
- Genres: Gangsta rap; R&B; jazz; g-funk
- Length: 59:32
- Labels: Qwest; Warner Bros.
- Producers: John Singleton (exec.); DJ Pooh; Rashad Coes; Al B. Sure!; Carl Bourelly; Craig King; DJ Jazzy Jeff; DJ Slip; Force One Network; Ice Cube; Keenan "The Maestro" Foster; Kyle West; Main Source; Raphael Saadiq; Sir Jinx; The Unknown DJ; Too $hort

Professional ratings
Review scores
Source	Rating
AllMusic	3/5 stars
RapReviews	6.5/10

Boyz n the Hood: Music from the Motion Picture is the soundtrack to John Singleton's 1991 film Boyz n the Hood. It was released on July 9, 1991, through Qwest Records with distribution via Warner Bros. Records, and contains mostly hip-hop. The album consists of fourteen songs performed by the likes of 2 Live Crew, Compton's Most Wanted, Hi-Five, Ice Cube, Kam, Main Source, Monie Love, Too $hort, Yo-Yo and more. Audio production was handled by several record producers, including DJ Pooh, Al B. Sure!, DJ Jazzy Jeff, DJ Slip, Raphael Saadiq, Sir Jinx and The Unknown DJ. The soundtrack made it to number 12 on the Billboard 200 albums chart in the United States.

The album also spawned two singles: Tevin Campbell's "Just Ask Me To", which peaked at number 88 on the Billboard Hot 100 and at number nine on the Hot R&B/Hip-Hop Songs, and Tony! Toni! Toné!'s "Me and You".

== Track listing ==
No.	Title	Writer(s)	Producer(s)	Length
1.	"How to Survive in South Central" (performed by Ice Cube)	O'Shea Jackson; Roger Troutman; Larry Troutman	Ice Cube; Sir Jinx	3:40
2.	"Just Ask Me To" (performed by Tevin Campbell and Chubb Rock)	Albert Brown; Kyle West; Richard Simpson	Al B. Sure!; Kyle West	4:08
3.	"Mama Don't Take No Mess" (performed by Yo-Yo)	Yolanda Whitaker; Lionel Richie; Thomas McClary; William King; Ronald LaPread; Walter Orange; Milan Williams	DJ Pooh; Rashad Coes	4:05
4.	"Growin' Up in the Hood" (performed by Compton's Most Wanted)	Aaron Tyler; Terry Allen; Andre Manuel; Joe Simon	DJ Slip; The Unknown DJ	4:13
5.	"Just a Friendly Game of Baseball (Remix)" (performed by Main Source)	Paul Mitchell; Kevin Mckenzie; Shawn McKenzie	Main Source	4:02
6.	"Me and You" (performed by Tony! Toni! Toné!)	Raphael Wiggins	Raphael Wiggins	4:11
7.	"Work It Out" (performed by Monie Love)	Simone Johnson; Jeffrey Townes	Craig King; DJ Jazzy Jeff	4:15
8.	"Every Single Weekend" (performed by Kam)	Craig Miller; Lenny Kravitz	DJ Pooh; Rashad Coes	4:37
9.	"Too Young" (performed by Hi-Five and Prodigy)	Carl Bourelly; Jean-Paul Bourelly	Carl Bourelly	4:35
10.	"Hangin' Out" (performed by the 2 Live Crew)	Christopher Wongwon; Mark Ross; David Hobbs; Michael McCray	DJ Mike Fresh	2:36
11.	"It's Your Life" (performed by Too $hort)	Todd Shaw	Too $hort; Keenan "The Maestro" Foster	4:47
12.	"Spirit (Does Anybody Care?)" (performed by Force One Network)	Darrell Savage; James Dright; Solomon Isom	Force One Network	4:19
13.	"Setembro (Brazilian Wedding Song)" (performed by Quincy Jones)	Gilson Peranzzetta; Ivan Lins	Quincy Jones	5:07
14.	"Black on Black Crime" (performed by Stanley Clarke)	Stanley Clarke	Stanley Clarke	4:36
Total length:				59:32

== Other songs ==
- The following songs did appear in the film but were not released on any soundtrack:

No.	Title	Writer(s)	Length
1.	"Jam on It" (performed by Newcleus)	Maurice Benjamin Cenac	6:26
2.	"Sunshower" (performed by Dr. Buzzard's Original Savannah Band)	Stony Browder Jr.; August Darnell	4:04
3.	"More Bounce to the Ounce" (performed by Zapp)	Roger Troutman	9:25
4.	"Sucker M.C.'s" (performed by Run-DMC)	Lawrence Smith; Joseph Simmons; Darryl McDaniels	3:09
5.	"O-o-h Child" (performed by the Five Stairsteps)	Stan Vincent	3:11
6.	"Let's Go" (performed by Kool Moe Dee)	Mohandas Dewese	5:24

== Charts ==
=== Weekly charts ===
Chart (1991)	Peak position
US Billboard 200	12
US Top R&B/Hip-Hop Albums (Billboard)	1

=== Year-end charts ===
Chart (1991)	Position
US Billboard 200	93
US Top R&B/Hip-Hop Albums (Billboard)	42

== Certifications ==
Region	Certification	Certified units/sales
United States (RIAA)	Gold	500,000^{^}
^{^} Shipments figures based on certification alone.

== See also ==
- List of Billboard number-one R&B albums of 1991
