= T.E.V.I.N. =

Studio album by Tevin Campbell
- Released: November 19, 1991
- Recorded: December 1989 – October 1991
- Genre: R&B; new jack swing; soul
- Length: 55:48
- Label: Qwest; Warner Bros.
- Producer: Quincy Jones; Al B. Sure!; Narada Michael Walden; Prince; Arthur Baker; Kyle West

Tevin Campbell chronology
T.E.V.I.N. (1991)	I'm Ready (1993)

Singles from T.E.V.I.N
- 1. "Tell Me What You Want Me to Do" Released: November 12, 1991; 2. "Goodbye" Released: February 20, 1992; 3. "Strawberry Letter 23" Released: May 14, 1992; 4. "Alone with You" Released: June 19, 1992; 5. "Confused" Released: October 29, 1992; 6. "One Song" Released: January 12, 1993

T.E.V.I.N. is the debut studio album by American R&B singer Tevin Campbell. It was released by Qwest Records on November 19, 1991. Recorded within a year, Campbell worked with a wide range of pop and R&B producers on his debut, including Narada Michael Walden, Arthur Baker, Al B. Sure, and Kyle West. With the singer still in his early teens and his voice changing during puberty, several song on the album were re-recorded during the production. Campbell himself co-wrote two songs on T.E.V.I.N..

The album received generally mixed reviews, with praise for Campbell's vocals and standout tracks like "Round and Round," though some critics felt the material lacked personality. It reached number 38 on the US Billboard Hot 100 and peaked at number five on the US Top R&B/Hip-Hop Albums. Reaching Platinum status in the US, T.E.V.I.N. produced two number-one singles on the R&B chart, including "Tell Me What You Want Me to Do" and "Alone with You," the former of which received a Best Male R&B Vocal Performance nomination at the 1992 Grammy Awards.

== Background ==
At the age of 12, a family friend had Campbell singing to jazz singer Bobbi Humphrey who arranged for him to perform at a videotaped showcase in Manhattan. When the tape found its way into the hands of manager Benny Medina, he flew to Texas and signed Campbell with Warner Bros. Records shortly thereafter. The family then relocated to Encino, Los Angeles where Campbell attended a private school in Sherman Oaks neighborhood. Medina consulted Quincy Jones to work with Campbell. In 1989, he made his debut on Jones' single "Tomorrow (A Better You, Better Me)," after Michael Jackson, Jones's original favorite to lead the song, backed out. Released as the lead single from Jones' ensemble album Back on the Block (1989), it reached number one on Billboard's US Hot R&B/Hip-Hop Songs chart in June 1990. Then, at Medina's urging, Prince recruited Campbell to record the song "Round and Round" for his rock musical drama Graffiti Bridge (1990). It reached number twelve on the US Billboard Hot 100 and earned Campbell a Grammy Award nomination for Best Male R&B Vocal Performance at the 33rd awards ceremony.

== Production ==
T.E.V.I.N., Campbell's debut album, took over a year to record. Coming fresh from the success of "Round and Round," Campbell and Medina wanted Prince to be the sole producer of the album — a plan that ultimately fell through, although Prince had at one point shown interest in taking on the role. With Campbell also signed to Jones' own label Qwest Records, his joint venture with Warner Bros., Jones, as executive producer of the album, felt that Campbell needed to work with "some different producers, to explore several directions and maximize his potential". He therefore arranged for him to work with a greater variety of pop and R&B producers, including Narada Michael Walden, Arthur Baker, Al B. Sure, Michael Omartian and Jones' son Quincy Jones III. Campbell found little enjoyment in the recording sessions. As he was going through puberty, his voice was changing to the point where he had little control over it — one day he could hit the high notes, and the next, his voice was gone. Because of this, him and the producers often had to return to the studio and re-record songs. Moreover, he felt alienated from the recorded material, as he struggled to connect with it.

== Promotion ==
Following the success of "Tomorrow (A Better You, Better Me)" and "Round and Round," Qwest Records and Warner Bros. placed "Just Ask Me To" featuring rapper Chubb Rock on the soundtrack to director John Singleton's 1991 coming-of-age film Boyz n the Hood. Released on June 26, 1991, as one of its singles, it became another top ten hit for Campbell on the Hot R&B/Hip-Hop Songs chart and was later also included on T.E.V.I.N.. "Tell Me What You Want Me to Do," co-written by Campbell and produced by Walden, was issued as the album's lead single on November 12, 1991. It became Campbell first top ten hit on the US Billboard Hot 100, peaking at number six, and spent one week at number-one on the US R&B chart. "Tell Me What You Want Me to Do" ultimately achieved Gold status from the Recording Industry Association of America (RIAA).

"Goodbye, co-produced by Sure and West, was issued as the album's second single in February 1992. While it reached number two on the Hot R&B/Hip-Hop Songs chart, it was less successful on the Billboard Hot 100, only reaching number 85. "Strawberry Letter 23," a Jones-produced cover version of Shuggie Otis 1971 song, was released as the album's third single. A minor success in the United States, it reached number 23 on the New Zealand Singles Chart. Fourth single "Alone with You," another Sure/West co-production, became Campbell's second song to top the Hot R&B/Hip-Hop Songs. "Confused" and "One Song" served as the album's fifth and sixth single, respectively, though only "Confused" managed to reach the R&B chart, peaking at number 33.

== Critical reception ==
Professional ratings
Review scores
Source	Rating
AllMusic	4.5/5 stars
Entertainment Weekly	A−
Los Angeles Times	3/4 stars

The album earned generally mixed reviews from music critics. Entertainment Weekly gave T.E.V.I.N. an "A−" rating and noted: "The 15-year-old's got a lucid, choirboy's voice, an unerring instinct for the right song, and a fetching sense of humor". Lynn Norment, writing for Ebony, called the album an "entertaining showcase for the 15-year-old heartthrob." She found that Campbell "delivers a winning product that foretells a long and prosperous recording future". AllMusic editor Stephen Thomas Erlewine rated the album four and a half out of five stars. He wrote that Campbell's "voice is remarkably expressive, able to handle both ballads and up-tempo dance tracks without losing confidence. When he has the right material – like the hit single, Prince's "Round and Round" – the results are flawless; if the material is weak, he's merely enjoyable".

Connie Johnson from the Los Angeles Times wrote that "in a record world crowded with good singers, Campbell has an extra little edge that makes him destined to be more than just a background attraction on somebody else's record. On his [debut] album, Campbell wasn't fortunate enough to be handed 12 tracks that are as commanding as he is – but here and there he gets lucky. He gets a chance to wail on "Tell Me What You Want Me to Do", a slow-burning Narada Michael Walden ballad that is positively stunning". She added: "Elsewhere, on "Just Ask Me To" and "She's All That", he looks like the most talented kid to tackle a pop song since Michael Jackson fronted the Jackson 5". In a lukewarm review for Vibe, editor Christian Wright called the album a "sweet, if confused, album of timid classroom daydreams and mature romantic yearnings." Less impressed, Washington Post critic Geoffrey Himes found the album to be a "bit underwhelming". He found that "Campbell owns an especially strong and true tenor, and the album is full of impressive vocal flourishes, but there's little personality behind the voice".

== Commercial performance ==
T.E.V.I.N. debuted at number 103 on the US Billboard 200 in the week of July 12, 1991. It eventually peaked at number 38 in its 13th week on the chart. The album also opened at number 75 on the US Top R&B/Hip-Hop Albums chart, reaching number five in its 15th week. Billboard ranked it eighth on its 1992 Top R&B/Hip-Hop Albums year-end listing. T.E.V.I.N. was certified Gold by Recording Industry Association of America (RIAA) on February 18, 1992. It reached Platinum status in July 1994.

== Track listing ==
T.E.V.I.N. track listing
No.	Title	Writer(s)	Producer(s)	Length
1.	"Round and Round" (Soul Mix)	Prince; Justin Warfield	Prince	4:54
2.	"Interlude"/"Over the Rainbow and on to the Sun"	Narada Michael Walden	Walden	0:49
3.	"Tell Me What You Want Me to Do"	Walden; Tevin Campbell; Sally Jo Dakota	Walden	5:03
4.	"Lil' Brother"	Walden; Mike Mani; Skyler Jett	Walden	4:09
5.	"Alone with You"	Al B. Sure!; Kyle West	Al B. Sure!; West	5:07
6.	"Strawberry Letter 23"	Shuggie Otis	Quincy Jones	4:07
7.	"One Song"	Marilyn Bergman; Alan Bergman; Marvin Hamlisch	Jones	4:27
8.	"Just Ask Me To" (featuring Chubb Rock)	Sure; West; Rock	Sure; West	4:07
9.	"Goodbye"	Sure; West	Sure; West	4:17
10.	"Perfect World"	Axel Kroel; Tina Baker	Arthur Baker	4:32
11.	"Confused"	Sure; West	Sure; West	4:57
12.	"Look What We'd Have (If You Were Mine)"	Walden; Campbell; Tony Lindsay	Walden	4:40
13.	"She's All That"	Axel Kroell; Tina Baker; Tony McIlwain	Arthur Baker	4:48
Total length:				55:48

== Personnel ==
Adapted from AllMusic.

- Dave Aaron – assistant, mixing assistant
- Al B. Sure! – arranger, producer, background vocals
- Maxi Anderson – background vocals
- Airiq Anest – assistant, mixing
- Arthur Baker – producer
- Tina Baker – background vocals
- Rose Banks – background vocals
- Kevin Becka – technical assistance
- Louis Biancaniello – associate producer, keyboards, programming, drums, Fairlight bass, Moog bass, synthesizer arrangements
- Vernon "Ice" Black – guitar
- Tevin Campbell – narrator, main vocals
- Terry Christian – engineer
- Keith "KC" Cohen – mixing
- Tyler Collins– background vocals
- Eric Daniels – piano
- JoJo Hailey – background vocals, vocal arrangements
- K-Ci Hailey – background vocals, vocal arrangements
- Dave Darlington – engineer
- Lynn Davis – background vocals
- Nathan East – bass
- David Frazer – engineer, mixing
- Tom Garneau – engineer
- Mick Guzauski – mixing
- Jerry Hey – horn arrangements, string arrangements, trumpet
- Dan Higgins – Saxophone
- Janet Hinde – assistant producer,
- Phillip Ingram – background vocals
- Kimm James – assistant engineer
- Skyler Jett – background vocals
- Femi Jiya – engineer
- Karen Jones – A&R
- Quincy Jones – executive producer
- Michael Koppelman – engineer
- Axel Kroell – programming
- Ricky Lawson – drums
- Janice Lee – production coordination
- Robin Lynch – art direction
- Mike Mani – associate producer, keyboards, programming, drum programming, Fairlight CMI, synthesizer arrangements
- Richard McKernan – engineer, string engineer
- Kelly McRae – production coordination
- Benny Medina – A&R, executive producer
- B.J. Nelson – background vocals
- Michael Omartian – arranger, drums, producer, programming, synthesizer
- David Pack – background vocals
- Victoria Pearson – photography
- Elliott Peters – engineer
- Greg Phillinganes – keyboards
- Mark Plati – engineer, programming
- Prince – arranger, multi instruments, producer, voices
- QDIII – producer, scratching, synthesizer
- William Frank "Bill" Reichenbach Jr. – Trombone
- Marc Reyburn – Engineer
- Claytoven Richardson – production consultant, background vocals
- Marnie Riley – assistant engineer
- Angel Rogers – background vocals
- Susan Rogers – engineer
- Greg Ross – design
- Lovis Scalise – engineer
- Cynthia Shiloh – production coordination
- Susan – engineer
- JoAnn Tominaga – coordination
- Rob Trow – background vocals
- Junior Vasquez – mixing, post production
- Kevin Walden – production coordination
- Narada Michael Walden – drums, keyboards, producer, programming
- Justin Warfield – rapping
- Kyle West – producer
- Larry Williams – saxophone
- Ric Wilson – acoustic guitar
- Monalisa Young – background vocals
- Todd Yvega – synthesizer, synthesizer programming

== Charts ==
=== Weekly charts ===
Weekly chart performance for T.E.V.I.N.
Chart (1991–94)	Peak position
Australian Albums (ARIA)	98
New Zealand Albums (RMNZ)	31
US Billboard 200	38
US Top R&B/Hip-Hop Albums (Billboard)	5

=== Year-end charts ===
Year-end chart performance for T.E.V.I.N.
Chart (1992)	Position
US Billboard 200	94
US Top R&B/Hip-Hop Albums (Billboard)	8

== Certifications ==
Certifications for T.E.V.I.N.
Region	Certification	Certified units/sales
United States (RIAA)	Platinum	1,000,000^{^}
^{^} Shipments figures based on certification alone.
