= Finesse (Glenn Jones album) =

Studio album by Glenn Jones
- Released: August 14, 1984; May, 2010 (CD reissue)
- Recorded: 1983–1984
- Studio: Celestial Sound Studios, New York, NY; Dawnbreaker Studios, San Fernando, CA; Devonshire Sound Studios, Hollywood, CA
- Genre: R&B; pop; soul
- Length: 62:11
- Label: RCA
- Producer: Leon Sylvers III; LaLa Cope; Steve Horton; Wayne Brathwaite

Glenn Jones chronology
Everybody Loves A Winner (1983)	Finesse (1984)	Take It From Me (1986)

Singles from Finesse
- 1. "Show Me" Released: 1984; 2. "Bring Back Your Love" Released: 1985; 3. "Everlasting Love" Released: 1985

Finesse is the second studio album by American R&B/soul singer Glenn Jones. Released in 1984 on RCA Records. The album features the lead hit single "Show Me" which peaked to number 3 on Billboard's R&B Songs chart and the top 20 hit single "Bring Back Your Love".

== Track listing ==
No.	Title	Writer(s)	Length
1.	"Finesse"	Leon Sylvers III; Pamela Phillips-Oland	5:09
2.	"You're The One I Love"	Steve Horton	5:44
3.	"Show Me"	LaLa Cope	5:30
4.	"It Hurts To Much"	Dana Marshall; Wardell Potts, Jr	5:11
5.	"Meet Me Halfway There"	Marshall; Dana Meyers; Rickey Smith; Potts	5:36
6.	"Bring Back Your Love"	Marshall; Smith; Potts	5:28
7.	"Everlasting Love"	Angelique Giles; Wayne Brathwaite	5:39
8.	"On The Floor"	Marshall; Smith; Sidney Justin	5:03

Reissue bonus tracks
No.	Title	Writer(s)	Length
9.	"Finesse" (12" Remix)		5:04
10.	"I Am Somebody" (12" Remix)	Kossi Gardner	6:28
11.	"I Am Somebody" (Instrumental)		5:30

== Personnel and credits ==
Credits taken from album liner notes.

- Lead Vocals – Glenn Jones
- Arranged By [Vocals] – Dana Marshall (2) (tracks: 4, 6), Dana Meyers (tracks: 5), LaLa* (tracks: 7), Leon Sylvers III* (tracks: 1), Sidney Justin (tracks: 8), Wardell Potts Jr. (tracks: 4, 6, 8)
- Backing Vocals – Bernard Fowler (tracks: 7), Dana Marshall (2) (tracks: 6), Dana Meyers (tracks: 1, 4, 5), Freddie Jackson (tracks: 3)
  Glenn Jones (tracks: 5, 6, 8), LaLa (tracks: 3, 7), Leon Sylvers III (tracks: 1), Meli'sa Morgan (tracks: 2), Sidney Justin (tracks: 6), Steve Horton (tracks: 2), Yolanda Lee-Lewis (tracks: 7)
- Bass – Kevin Walker (tracks: 1), LaLa (tracks: 3), Rickey Smith (tracks: 4 to 6, 8), Wayne Brathwaite (tracks: 2, 3, 7)
- Coordinator [Reissue] – Paul M. Robinson
- Drum Programming – Kevin Walker (tracks: 1), Steve Horton (tracks: 2), Wayne Brathwaite (tracks: 2)
- Drums – J.T. Lewis (tracks: 3, 7), Wardell Potts Jr. (tracks: 4 to 6, 8)
- Guitar – Chuck Gentry (2) (tracks: 5), Earnest "Pepper" Reed* (tracks: 1, 4), Marlo Henderson (tracks: 1)
  Steve Horton (tracks: 2, 3, 7), Steve Recker (tracks: 7, 8)
- Keyboards – Barry Eastmond (tracks: 3, 7), Kevin Walker (tracks: 1), LaLa (tracks: 2, 3), Rickey Smith (tracks: 4 to 6, 8), Steve Horton (tracks: 2)
  Wardell Potts Jr. (tracks: 4), Wayne Brathwaite (tracks: 7)
- Percussion – Jorge Bermudez (tracks: 4, 6), LaLa (tracks: 3), Leon Sylvers III (tracks: 1), Steve Horton (tracks: 2, 3), Terrance Floyd (tracks: 5)
  Wardell Potts Jr. (tracks: 8), Wayne Brathwaite (tracks: 3)
- Piano, Soloist – Barry Eastmond (tracks: 7)
- Synthesizer [Bass] – Kevin Walker (tracks: 1), Rickey Smith (tracks: 4 to 6, 8)
- Synthesizer [Synclavier] – Kashif (tracks: 3)
- Executive-Producer – Louise C. West
- Engineer [Mastering] – Tom Coyne
- Engineer [Recording] – Jim Shifflet, Kirk Ferraioli, Les Cooper, Mike Frenke
- Mastered By – Tony Wells
- Producer – LaLa Cope (tracks: 2, 3, 7), Leon Sylvers III (tracks: 1 to 6, 8, 9), Robert Wright (tracks: 10, 11)
  Steve Horton (tracks: 2, 3, 7), Wayne Brathwaite (tracks: 2, 3, 7)
- Production Manager [Reissue] – Matt Murphy
- Reissue Producer – Donald Cleveland, Tony Calvert
- Remastered By – Mark Wilder
- Remix [Engineer] – Michael H. Brauer (tracks: 10, 11)
- Remix producer – Nick Martinelli & David Todd (tracks: 1, 2, 5, 6)

Phonographic Copyright (p) – RCA/JIVE Label Group Copyright (c) – Funkytowngrooves USA Manufactured By – Sony Music Entertainment

== Charts ==
=== Weekly charts ===
Chart (1984)	Peak position
US Top R&B/Hip-Hop Albums (Billboard)	18

=== Year-end charts ===
Chart (1985)	Position
US Top R&B/Hip-Hop Albums (Billboard)	49

=== Singles ===
Year	Single	Peak positions	
Year	Single	US Pop	US R&B
1984	"Show Me"	—	3
1985	"Bring Back Your Love"	—	18
1985	"Everlasting Love"	—	85
