= Confused (song) =

Single by Tevin Campbell

from the album T.E.V.I.N.
- Released: October 29, 1992
- Length: 4:57
- Label: Qwest
- Songwriters: Al B. Sure; Kyle West
- Producers: Al B. Sure; Kyle West

Tevin Campbell singles chronology
"Alone with You" (1992)	"Confused" (1992)	"One Song" (1993)

"Confused" is a song by American singer Tevin Campbell. It was written and produced by Al B. Sure! and Kyle West for his debut studio album T.E.V.I.N. (1991). The song was released as the album's seventh single on October 29, 1992, reaching number 33 on the US Billboard Hot R&B/Hip-Hop Songs chart.

== Track listings ==
US cassette single
No.	Title	Writer(s)	Producer(s)	Length
1.	"Confused" (Edit w/Rap)	Al B. Sure!; Kyle West	Sure; West; David Eaton^{[a]}	4:14
2.	"Lil' Brother" (Album Version)	Narada Michael Walden; Mike Mani; Skyler Jett	Walden	4:08

Notes

- ^{^[a]} denotes additional producer

== Credits and personnel ==
Credits lifted from the liner notes of T.E.V.I.N..

- Tevin Campbell – background vocalist, lead vocalist
- JoJo Hailey – background vocalist
- K-Ci Hailey – background vocalist
- Quincy Jones – executive producer
- Benny Medina – executive producer
- Al B. Sure! – background vocalist, lyrics, producer
- Kyle West – lyrics, producer

== Charts ==
Chart (1992)	Peak position
US Hot R&B/Hip-Hop Songs (Billboard)	33
