= Strawberry Letter 23 =

1977 single by The Brothers Johnson

Song by Shuggie Otis

from the album Freedom Flight
- Released: 1971
- Genre: Psychedelic soul; psychedelic rock
- Label: Epic
- Songwriter: Shuggie Otis
- Producer: Johnny Otis

"Strawberry Letter 23"

Single by the Brothers Johnson

from the album Right on Time
- B-side: "Dancin' and Prancin'"
- Released: June 1977
- Recorded: 1977
- Genre: Disco; funk
- Length: 3:39 (single edit); 4:59 (album version); 5:04 (12" single version)
- Label: A&M
- Songwriter: Shuggie Otis
- Producer: Quincy Jones

The Brothers Johnson singles chronology
"Runnin' for Your Lovin'" (1977)	"Strawberry Letter 23" (1977)	"Ain't We Funkin' Now" (1978)

"Strawberry Letter 23" is a song written and composed by Shuggie Otis from his 1971 album Freedom Flight. It is also widely known by the 1977 cover version recorded by the Brothers Johnson and produced by Quincy Jones.

== Lyrics ==
The song's chorus says "Strawberry Letter 22" instead of the actual title of the song. This is because the premise of the song is that a couple is exchanging love letters in musical form. The singer is creating "Strawberry Letter 23" as a reply to the song he has received from his lover, and he refers to her previous message as "Strawberry Letter 22" when replying.

== The Brothers Johnson version ==
George Johnson, of the Brothers Johnson, was dating one of Otis's cousins when he came across the 1971 album Freedom Flight. The group then recorded "Strawberry Letter 23" for their 1977 album Right on Time, which was produced by Quincy Jones, and the album went platinum. Their rendition hit the Billboard Hot 100 and peaked at number five and reached number one on Soul Singles. Studio guitarist Lee Ritenour recreated Otis's original guitar solo for the Brothers Johnson cover. The 12" single was pressed on red strawberry-scented vinyl.

== Chart performance ==
=== Weekly charts ===
Chart (1977–1978)	Peak position
Australia (KMR)	25
Canada Top Singles (RPM)	8
Canada RPM Adult Contemporary	43
Netherlands (Single Top 100)	25
New Zealand (Recorded Music NZ)	2
UK Singles (Official Charts)	35
U.S. Billboard Hot 100	5
U.S. Billboard R&B	1
U.S. Billboard Adult Contemporary	38
U.S. Cash Box Top 100	8

=== Year-end charts ===
Chart (1977)	Rank
Canada	85
New Zealand	47
U.S. Billboard Hot 100	54
U.S. Cash Box	64

== Legacy ==
Pitchfork chose the Brothers Johnson version as the 134th best song of the 1970s.

== Tevin Campbell version ==
"Strawberry Letter 23"

Single by Tevin Campbell

from the album T.E.V.I.N.
- Released: May 14, 1992
- Recorded: 1991
- Genre: R&B, new jack swing
- Length: 4:07
- Label: Qwest/Warner Bros.
- Songwriter: Shuggie Otis
- Producer: Quincy Jones

Tevin Campbell singles chronology
"Goodbye" (1992)	"Strawberry Letter 23" (1992)	"Alone with You" (1992)

"Strawberry Letter 23" is the fifth single from R&B singer Tevin Campbell's 1991 debut studio album T.E.V.I.N.. It peaked at #53 on the Hot 100 and #40 on the R&B charts. The Tevin Campbell version is more up-tempo, with a new jack swing beat, and includes a rap that mentions "the letter 23."

=== Track listings ===
US Promo CD

1. Strawberry Letter 23 (Album Edit w/o Rap) 3:48
2. Strawberry Letter 23 (Album Version) 4:07
3. Strawberry Letter 23 (Single Remix w/Rap) 4:15
4. Strawberry Letter 23 (Single Remix w/o Rap) 3:35

US Maxi-CD

1. Strawberry Letter 23 (QDIII Mix Without Rap) 3:45
2. Strawberry Letter 23 (QDIII Mix With Rap) 4:12
3. Strawberry Letter 23 (QDIII Fat Choice Mix) 4:48
4. Strawberry Letter 23 (Album Edit Without Rap) 3:24
5. Strawberry Letter 23 (Soul Mix With Rap) 4:15
6. Strawberry Letter 23 (T.C.'s Choice) 4:04
7. Strawberry Letter 23 (Soul Mix Without Rap) 3:35
8. Strawberry Letter 23 (Club Mix) 6:28
9. Strawberry Letter 23 (Club Dub) 5:58
10. Strawberry Letter 23 (Naughty Beats) 4:42

=== Charts ===
Chart (1992)	Peak position
New Zealand (Recorded Music NZ)	23
US Billboard Hot 100	53
US Hot R&B/Hip-Hop Songs (Billboard)	40
