= With Love from Our Friends =

Studio album by Full Force
- Released: August 22, 2014
- Genre: R&B
- Length: 71:39
- Label: Full Force (#88843085492)
- Producer: Full Force

Full Force chronology
Full Force, of Course (2009)	With Love from Our Friends (2014)

Professional ratings
Review scores
Source	Rating
Allmusic	3/5 stars

With Love from Our Friends is the Ninth studio album by American R&B group Full Force, released on August 22, 2014 through Full Force Productions, a license to Sony Music Entertainment.

== Track listing ==
No.	Title	Featured artist(s)	Length
1.	"I Feel Good, I Look Good, I'm God Good"	Faith Evans with Sheila E. and The God Good Choir & Children	4:58
2.	"Your Love Makes Me High"	Raphael Saadiq and Shanice	4:53
3.	"All Cried Out"	Tisha Campbell-Martin	4:02
4.	"Thank You for Leaving Me"	Meli'sa Morgan and Cheryl Pepsii Riley with Vivica A. Fox	4:11
5.	"Let It Flow"	Tevin Campbell and Naturi Naughton	4:13
6.	"All I Have to Give"	Lil' G of Silk, Slim of 112, Steve Russell of Troop and RL of Next	5:09
7.	"A Night That We Will Never Forget"	CeCe Peniston and Freedom Williams of C+C Music Factory	5:29
8.	"Most Definitely"	Allure	5:03
9.	"From These Lips to God's Ear"	Regina Belle, Howard Hewett, Cheryl Pepsii Riley and The God Good Choir	5:24
10.	"The Way I Believe in You"	Tisha Campbell-Martin	4:28
11.	"Do U Believe in Heaven?"	Blair Underwood, Malcolm-Jamal Warner, Omari Hardwick and Big Daddy Kane with Najee	5:23
12.	"Roxanne Roxanne (The New Chapter)"	Lou$tar with UTFO and Roxanne Shanté	4:49
13.	"Can't Thank You Enough"	Force MDs	4:12
14.	"I Wish I Had a Girl Like You"	Raymond Luke Jr.	4:11
15.	"Dance, Dance, Throw Ur Hands Up in the Air Air"	The House Party Bullies, Flavor Flav and Samantha Fox	5:14
Total length:			71:39

Download release (bonus tracks)
No.	Title	Writer(s)	Featured artist(s)	Length
16.	"Call Me When You Want It"		Santa and Lou$tar	4:30
17.	"Let It Go (FF Go Mix)"		Lisa Lisa and Cult Jam with Ex Girlfriend	4:41
18.	"All Cried Out (All Danced Out Geenius Mix)"		Tisha Campbell-Martin	6:22
19.	Untitled	I Feel Good, I Look Good, I'm God Good (The God Good Remix)	Faith Evans with Sheila E. and The God Good Choir & Children	4:54
Total length:				92:06
