= Here I Go Again (Glenn Jones song) =

Single by Glenn Jones

from the album Here I Go Again
- Released: November 26, 1991
- Recorded: 1991
- Genre: R&B
- Label: Atlantic Records
- Producers: Glenn Jones, Ray Watkins

Glenn Jones singles chronology
| "Can We Try Again" (1990) | "Here I Go Again" (1991) | "I've Been Searchin' (Nobody Like You)" (1992) |

Here I Go Again is the title of a number-one R&B single by singer Glenn Jones, which was released November 26, 1991. The hit song spent one week at number-one on the Billboard R&B chart and was his most successful song on the chart.

"Here I Go Again"- The music video was directed by Pierluca DeCarlo, produced by Jeff Beasley at Spellbound Pictures.

== Charts ==
=== Weekly charts ===
| Chart (1992) | Peak position |
|---|---|
| US Hot R&B/Hip-Hop Songs (Billboard) | 1 |

=== Year-end charts ===
| Chart (1992) | Position |
|---|---|
| US Hot R&B/Hip-Hop Songs (Billboard) | 20 |

== See also ==
- List of number-one R&B singles of 1992 (U.S.)
