= Alone with You (Tevin Campbell song) =

Single by Tevin Campbell

from the album T.E.V.I.N.
- Released: June 19, 1992
- Length: 5:07
- Label: Qwest
- Songwriter(s): Al B. Sure!; Kyle West
- Producer(s): Al B. Sure!; Kyle West

Tevin Campbell singles chronology
| "Strawberry Letter 23" (1992) | "Alone with You" (1992) | "Confused" (1992) |

"Alone with You" is a song by American singer Tevin Campbell. It was written and produced by Al B. Sure! and Kyle West for his debut studio album T.E.V.I.N. (1991). The song served as the album's sixth single, becoming its second song to reach number one on the US R&B charts where it stayed for one week. The song did not chart as well on the US Billboard Hot 100, peaking at number 72.

== Track listings ==
US cassette single
| No. | Title | Writer(s) | Producer(s) | Length |
|---|---|---|---|---|
| 1. | "Alone with You" (Album Version) | Al B. Sure!; Kyle West | Sure; West | 5:06 |
| 2. | "Just Ask Me To" (featuring Chubb Rock) | Sure; West; Rock | Sure; West | 4:07 |

== Credits and personnel ==
Credits lifted from the liner notes of T.E.V.I.N..

- Tevin Campbell – vocals
- Quincy Jones – executive producer
- Benny Medina – executive producer
- Al B. Sure! – lyrics, producer
- Kyle West – lyrics, producer

== Charts ==
| Chart (1992) | Peak position |
|---|---|
| US Billboard Hot 100 | 72 |
| US Hot R&B/Hip-Hop Songs (Billboard) | 1 |
| US Rhythmic (Billboard) | 36 |

== See also ==
- List of number-one R&B singles of 1992 (U.S.)
