= Tell Me What You Want Me to Do =

Single by Tevin Campbell

from the album T.E.V.I.N.
- Released: November 12, 1991
- Length: 5:01
- Label: Qwest
- Songwriter(s): Narada Michael Walden; Tevin Campbell; Sally Jo Dakota
- Producer(s): Narada Michael Walden

Tevin Campbell singles chronology
"Just Ask Me To" (1991)	"Tell Me What You Want Me to Do" (1991)	"Goodbye" (1992)

Music video
- "Tell Me What You Want Me to Do" on YouTube

"Tell Me What You Want Me to Do" is a song by American singer Tevin Campbell. It was written by Campbell, Sally Jo Dakota, and Narada Michael Walden and produced by the latter for his debut studio album, T.E.V.I.N. (1991). Released as the album's third single by Qwest Records, it became Campbell's biggest hit to date, peaking at number six on the US Billboard Hot 100 and spending one week at number-one on the US R&B chart. "Tell Me What You Want Me to Do" showcases Campbell's four-octave vocal range from a low note of E2 to a D#6 during the bridge of the song.

== Track listings ==
US 7" / 12" vinyl
No.	Title	Writer(s)	Producer(s)	Length
1.	"Tell Me What You Want Me to Do" (Edit)	Tevin Campbell; Sally Jo Dakota; Narada Michael Walden	Walden	4:16
2.	"Tell Me What You Want Me to Do" (Instrumental)	Campbell; Dakota; Walden	Walden	5:00

Japan CD single
No.	Title	Writer(s)	Producer(s)	Length
1.	"Tell Me What You Want Me to Do"	Campbell; Dakota; Walden	Walden	4:10
2.	"Tell Me What You Want Me to Do" (Instrumental)	Campbell; Dakota; Walden	Walden	4:10

German CD maxi-single
No.	Title	Writer(s)	Producer(s)	Length
1.	"Tell Me What You Want Me to Do" (Edit)	Campbell; Dakota; Walden	Walden	4:10
2.	"Just Ask Me To" (featuring Chubb Rock)	Al B. Sure!; Kyle West; Rock	Sure; West	4:07
3.	"Tomorrow (A Better You, Better Me)"	George Johnson; Louis Johnson; Siedah Garrett	Quincy Jones	4:46

UK CD single
No.	Title	Writer(s)	Producer(s)	Length
1.	"Tell Me What You Want Me to Do"	Campbell; Dakota; Walden	Walden	4:16
2.	"Goodbye" (7" Remix Edit)	Sure; West	Sure; West; Dancin' Danny D^{[a]}	3:48
3.	"Goodbye" (Sidub and Listen)	Sure; West	Sure; West; Dancin' Danny D^{[a]}	4:58
4.	"Goodbye" (Tevin's Dub Pt 1 & 2)	Sure; West	Sure; West; Dancin' Danny D^{[a]}	6:53

Notes

- ^{^[a]} denotes additional producer

== Charts ==
=== Weekly charts ===
Chart (1992)	Peak position
Australia (ARIA)	116
Netherlands (Dutch Top 40)	34
Netherlands (Single Top 100)	31
New Zealand (Recorded Music NZ)	9
UK Singles (OCC)	63
UK Dance (Music Week)	15
US Billboard Hot 100	6
US Adult Contemporary (Billboard)	43
US Hot R&B/Hip-Hop Songs (Billboard)	1

=== Year-end charts ===
Chart (1992)	Position
US Billboard Hot 100	35

== Certifications ==
Region	Certification	Certified units/sales
United States (RIAA)	Gold	500,000^{^}
^{^} Shipments figures based on certification alone.

== See also ==
- List of number-one R&B singles of 1992 (U.S.)
