= Right Now (Al B. Sure! song) =

"Right Now" is the title of a number-one R&B single by singer/actor Al B. Sure!. The hit song spent one week at number-one on the US R&B chart and peaked at number forty-seven on the Billboard Hot 100.

== Charts ==
Chart (1992)	Peak position
US Billboard Hot 100	47
US Hot R&B/Hip-Hop Singles & Tracks (Billboard)	1
US Cash Box Top 100	49

== See also ==
- List of number-one R&B singles of 1992 (U.S.)
