= Goodbye (Tevin Campbell song) =

Single by Tevin Campbell

from the album T.E.V.I.N.
- Released: February 20, 1992
- Length: 4:17
- Label: Qwest
- Songwriters: Al B. Sure!; Kyle West
- Producers: Al B. Sure!; Kyle West

Tevin Campbell singles chronology
"Tell Me What You Want Me to Do" (1991)	"Goodbye" (1992)	"Strawberry Letter 23" (1992)

"Goodbye" is a song by American R&B singer Tevin Campbell. It was written and produced by Al B. Sure! and Kyle West for his debut studio album T.E.V.I.N. (1991). In February 1992, the song was released as the album's fourth single by Qwest. It fared fairly well on the US Billboard R&B charts climbing to number two but not as much success on the pop charts, peaking at number 85 on the Billboard Hot 100. The accompanying music video features guest appearances by Tatyana Ali and Tyler Collins.

== Track listings ==
US promo single
No.	Title	Writer(s)	Producer(s)	Length
1.	"Goodbye" (Edit Without Rap)	Al B Sure!; Kyle West	Sure; West	4:00
2.	"Goodbye" (Album Version)	Sure; West	Sure; West	4:16

US promo single
No.	Title	Writer(s)	Producer(s)	Length
1.	"Goodbye" (Hakeem's Remix)	Sure; West	Sure; West; Hakim Abdulsamad^{[a]}; Roy "Dog" Pennon^{[b]}	4:16
2.	"Goodbye" (12" Dub)	Sure; West	Sure; West; Dancin' Danny D^{[a]}	4:16

US cassette single
No.	Title	Writer(s)	Producer(s)	Length
1.	"Goodbye" (Album Version)	Sure; West	Sure; West	4:16
2.	"Just Ask Me To" (featuring Chubb Rock)	Sure; West; Rock	Sure; West	4:07

Notes

- ^{^[a]} denotes additional producer
- ^{^[b]} denotes additional co-producer

== Charts ==
Chart (1992)	Peak position
UK Club Chart (Music Week)	61
US Billboard Hot 100	85
US Hot R&B/Hip-Hop Songs (Billboard)	2

== In popular culture ==
- The song is referenced by Inspectah Deck in the Wu-Tang Clan song "Protect Ya Neck" with the line "The vandal, too hot to handle / you battle, you're saying Goodbye like Tevin Campbell".
