= Graffiti Bridge (film) =

1990 musical drama film directed by Prince

- Theatrical release poster
- Directed by: Prince
- Written by: Prince
- Produced by: Arnold Stiefel; Randy Phillips
- Starring: Prince; Morris Day; Jerome Benton; The Time; Jill Jones; Mavis Staples; George Clinton; Ingrid Chavez; Tevin Campbell
- Cinematography: Bill Butler
- Edited by: Rebecca Ross
- Music by: Prince
- Production company: Paisley Park Films
- Distributed by: Warner Bros.
- Release date: November 2, 1990
- Running time: 90 minutes
- Country: United States
- Language: English
- Budget: $7 million
- Box office: $4.6 million

Graffiti Bridge is a 1990 American rock musical drama film written, directed by, and starring Prince in his third and final major theatrical film role. It is a standalone sequel to his 1984 film Purple Rain. Like its predecessor, it was accompanied by a soundtrack album of the same name.

== Plot ==
The plot continues with The Kid, living a future life as an upbeat performer and co-owner of a club, Glam Slam, which was willed to him from Billy, who owned the First Avenue Club in the first film. Solitary and lovelorn, he spends his personal time composing songs, and writing letters to his deceased father. The other co-owner who was included in the will is Morris, his rival who now also owns his own club, Pandemonium, while desiring to control the other two clubs in the Seven Corners area, which are Melody Cool and the Clinton Club. Needing to pay the mayor of Seven Corners $10,000, Morris attempts to extort The Kid – by threatening to take full ownership of Glam Slam. Making matters more interesting is the arrival of Aura, an angel sent from Heaven to sway both Morris and The Kid into leading more righteous lives – while dealing with their attraction to her. As The Kid continues to resist him, Morris begins to embarrass him via performances with his band, to steal The Kid's customers. Losing clientele and having his club defamed by Morris's henchmen, The Kid decides to challenge Morris to a music battle for ownership of Glam Slam. After Aura gets hit by a car, the two rivals settle their dispute and join forces.

== Cast ==
- Prince as The Kid, owner of the Glam Slam Club
- Morris Day as Morris, co-owner of Glam Slam, and the Pandemonium Club
- Jerome Benton as Jerome, Morris's assistant
- Jill Jones as Jill, Kid's girlfriend
- The Time as Themselves
  - Jimmy Jam as Himself
  - Jellybean Johnson as Himself
  - Jesse Johnson as Himself
  - Terry Lewis as Himself
  - Monte Moir as Himself
- Mavis Staples as Melody Cool, the owner of Melody Cool Club
- George Clinton as George, owner of the Clinton Club
- Ingrid Chavez as Aura, an angel
  - Elisa Fiorillo as Aura's singing voice (uncredited)
- Tevin Campbell as Tevin, the son of Melody Cool
- New Power Generation as Themselves
  - Michael Bland as Himself
  - Rosie Gaines as Herself
  - Levi Seacer Jr. as Himself
  - Miko Weaver as Himself
- Robin Power as Robin, co-owner of Glam Slam and the Pandemonium Club, who is the daughter of Billy, the owner of First Avenue Club in the first film
- Jevetta Steele as Melody Cool Choir
- George Clinton's Funkestra as Themselves
  - Patrick Adams as Himself
  - Atlanta Bliss as Himself
  - Mallia Franklin as Herself
  - Morris Hayes as Himself

== Production ==
According to Terry Lewis, the film was originally a vehicle for The Time, but "in the end the story got lost and it became a Prince picture. But that was cool. I think our rapport with Prince is better now than it's ever been, because there's a mutual respect in the air ... Plus we got to hang out for six months on somebody else's budget." Morris Day explained: "A sequel to Purple Rain is what it ended up being. And the role that The Time plays is, well, crooks. In Purple Rain we were small time crooks and now we've graduated to the big time. We own and control this area called Seven Corners – which is really four corners and four clubs – and everyone answers to us. It's really about the rivalry between us and The Kid (Prince), who is the picked-on, felt-sorry-for hero. But in the end he gets the girl and he beats us with a ballad. He changes our hearts and minds and makes us into good, church-going individuals with a song [laughs]."

Filming took place primarily at the soundstage inside of Paisley Park, and at locations around Minneapolis. The title Graffiti Bridge comes from a now torn-down bridge located in Eden Prairie, Minnesota. The bridge was torn down in the early 1990s to make way for new construction, but to this day remains a local legend.

== Soundtrack ==
Graffiti Bridge is tied into the album of the same name, which spawned the chart-making singles "Round and Round" and "New Power Generation", as well as "Thieves in the Temple". Despite the film receiving lukewarm responses from audiences, the accompanying album fared much better. Although there were many tracks, the following were selected for the album to appear in listed order within the film (although several appear in shorter and re-arranged lengths):

- "Can't Stop This Feeling I Got" – Prince (rearranged instrumental)
- "New Power Generation" – Prince and the New Power Generation
- "Release It" – The Time
- "We Can Funk" – Prince featuring George Clinton and Rosie Gaines
- "Elephants and Flowers" – Prince
- "Round and Round" – Tevin Campbell
- "Love Machine" – The Time and Elisa Fiorillo
- "Thieves in the Temple" – Prince
- "Joy in Repetition" – Prince
- "The Question of U" – Prince
- "Shake!" - The Time
- "Tick, Tick, Bang" – Prince
- "Number 1" – Robin Power
- "Melody Cool" – Mavis Staples
- "Still Would Stand All Time" – Prince
- "New Power Generation - Part 2" (plays in credits) – Prince and the New Power Generation
- "Graffiti Bridge" (plays in credits) – Prince

== Reception ==
The film was nominated for five Golden Raspberry Awards including Worst Picture, Worst Actor (Prince), Worst Director (Prince), Worst Screenplay (Prince), and Worst New Star (Ingrid Chavez) at the 11th Golden Raspberry Awards.

Despite media hype of it being the sequel to the massively successful Purple Rain, it was a commercial and critical failure and was included on several Worst of 1990 movie lists. Graffiti Bridge currently holds an 18% rating on Rotten Tomatoes based on 28 reviews, with an average rating of 3.7/10. Metacritic, which uses a weighted average, assigned the film a score of 36 out of 100, based on 18 critics, indicating "generally unfavorable" reviews.

However, the corresponding original soundtrack received widespread critical acclaim with glowing reviews from Rolling Stone's Paul Evans, Entertainment Weekly's Greg Sandow, and the Chicago Tribune's Greg Kot, the latter stating that the album was "a sprawling, wildly diffuse statement on love, sin, sex and salvation that ranks with his best work." In his review, Evans wrote that Prince

... has mustered a subversive triumph, making records half-brilliant, half-quirky, managing the Minneapolis scene with the ghost hand of a funky Gatsby, deploying an army-harem of disciples and flashing a dazzle of guises unified in their harlequin outrageousness. By the very promiscuity of these bold strategies, he has inseminated the whole of pop. With Graffiti Bridge and its firm coalescence of his styles and concerns, Prince reasserts his originality — and does it with the ease of a conqueror.

In 1991, Prince was quoted as saying:

"(It was) one of the purest, most spiritual, uplifting things I've ever done. It was non-violent, positive and had no blatant sex scenes. Maybe it will take people 30 years to get it. They trashed The Wizard of Oz at first, too."

== Home media ==
Graffiti Bridge was released on DVD on February 8, 2005. The film was released on Blu-ray for the first time on October 4, 2016, separately in a purple case and as part of the Prince Movie Collection.
