= The Secret Garden (Sweet Seduction Suite) =

1990 single by Quincy Jones

Single by Quincy Jones featuring Al B. Sure!, James Ingram, El DeBarge, and Barry White

from the album Back on the Block
- Released: 1990
- Genre: R&B
- Length: 6:40
- Label: Qwest
- Songwriters: Quincy Jones; Rod Temperton; Siedah Garrett; El DeBarge
- Producer: Quincy Jones

Quincy Jones singles chronology
"I'll Be Good to You" (1989)	"The Secret Garden (Sweet Seduction Suite)" (1990)	"Tomorrow (A Better You, Better Me)" (1990)

"The Secret Garden (Sweet Seduction Suite)" is a song by producer Quincy Jones, featuring R&B singers Al B. Sure!, James Ingram, El DeBarge, and Barry White. It was released as a single from Jones's album, Back on the Block (1989), and peaked at number one on the Billboard Black Singles chart for one week in 1990. It also reached number 31 on the Billboard Hot 100, number 26 on the Adult Contemporary chart, and number 67 on the UK Singles Chart. "The Secret Garden (Sweet Seduction Suite)" was written by Jones, Rod Temperton, Siedah Garrett and DeBarge and produced by Jones.

== Personnel ==
- El DeBarge – lead vocals, background vocals
- James Ingram – lead vocals
- Al B. Sure! – lead vocals, background vocals
- Barry White – lead vocals
- Siedah Garrett – background vocals
- Bill Summers – hindewhu
- Steve Lukather – guitar
- Greg Phillinganes – Fender Rhodes electric piano
- Larry Williams – keyboards, synth programming
- Neil Stubenhaus – bass guitar
- John Robinson – drums
- Jerry Hey – arranger
- Quincy Jones – arranger
- Rod Temperton – arranger
- Bruce Swedien – recording engineer, mixing, kick & snare drums

== Certifications ==
Region	Certification	Certified units/sales
United States (RIAA)	Gold	500,000^{^}
^{^} Shipments figures based on certification alone.
