= Glenn Jones =

American R&B/soul singer (born 1962)

- Born: September 27, 1962 (age 64); Jacksonville, Florida, U.S.
- Genres: R&B; soul
- Occupation: Singer
- Instruments: Vocals
- Years active: 1978–present
- Labels: RCA; Atlantic

Glenn Jones (born September 27, 1962 in Jacksonville, Florida) is an American R&B/soul singer. He is best known for his songs "Show Me", "We've Only Just Begun (The Romance Is Not Over)" and "Here I Go Again", which reached No. 1 on the Billboard R&B charts in 1991/1992, as well as the track "I've Been Searching (Nobody Like You)".

== Career ==
Jones started his career as a gospel singer, working and recording with the Florida-based gospel group, the Modulations, before managing a successful move into the R&B field. He got his recording start in R&B in 1980 when Norman Connors featured the singer on a track, "Melancholy Fire", on his album Take It to the Limit. The song was released as a single, climbing to No. 20 on the Billboard R&B chart.

Jones toured with Connors, and in 1983 he signed a deal with RCA. In the same year, he issued a five-track mini-album Everybody Loves a Winner that had the top-30 R&B single, "I Am Somebody". His first full-length album, Finesse, was released in 1984. The single "Show Me" reached No. 3 on the R&B charts. The second single, "Bring Back Your Love", reached No. 18 on the R&B charts.

He started recording for his third RCA album in 1985; Take It from Me was released the following year. The album's title track was featured in the 1986 movie Youngblood.

Moving to Jive in 1987, Jones scored a hit with "We've Only Just Begun", which reached No. 2 on the Billboard magazine R&B chart. The track was the lead single from the album Glenn Jones, released in 1987.

His last album on Jive was All for You, which peaked on the R&B album charts at No. 27. "Can We Try Again" and the title track were produced by a then-less well known producer by the name of Teddy Riley.

In 1991, Jones moved to Atlantic Records. During the same year, he released the album Here I Go Again. Its first single, "Here I Go Again", was his only single to reach No. 1 on the R&B charts. The second single, "I've Been Searchin' (Nobody Like You)", was also successful, peaking at No. 8 R&B. His album Here I Am was released in 1994 and had a minor hit with the ballad "Round and Round", which reached No. 24 on the R&B charts.

In 1993, British girl group Eternal covered Jones's 1990 track "Stay" and released it as their debut single, reaching No. 4 in the UK and No. 19 in the US Billboard charts.

Jones released the album It's Time in 1998 and Feels Good (Peak Records) in 2002, neither of which were very successful on the charts.

== Discography ==
=== Studio albums ===
| Year | Title | Label | Format | Peak chart positions | | |
| Year | Title | Label | Format | US R&B | US Pop | UK |
|---|---|---|---|---|---|---|
| 1983 | Everybody Loves a Winner | RCA | EP | — | — | — |
| 1984 | Finesse | RCA | LP, CD | 18 | — | — |
| 1986 | Take It from Me | RCA | LP, CD | 45 | — | — |
| 1987 | Glenn Jones | Jive | LP, CD | 16 | 94 | 62 |
| 1990 | All for You | Jive | LP, CD | 27 | — | — |
| 1992 | Here I Go Again | Atlantic | LP, CD | 22 | — | — |
| 1994 | Here I Am | Atlantic | LP, CD | 39 | — | — |
| 1998 | It's Time | SAR Records | CD | 51 | — | — |
| 2002 | Feels Good | Peak | CD | 88 | — | — |
| 2006 | Forever: Timeless R&B Classics | Shanachie | CD | 49 | — | — |
"—" denotes releases that did not chart or were not released in that territory.

With the Modulations

| Year | Title | Label | Format |
|---|---|---|---|
| 1978 | With a Made Up Mind | Savoy | LP |
| 1980 | Feel the Fire | Savoy | LP |

=== Compilations ===
| Year | Title | Label | Format |
|---|---|---|---|
| 1992 | The Best of Glenn Jones | Jive | LP, CD |
| 1998 | Greatest Hits: Giving Myself to You | Razor & Tie | CD |

=== Singles ===
| Year | Title | Peak chart positions | | | | | |
| Year | Title | US R&B | US R&B Airplay | US Pop | US AC | US Dance | UK |
|---|---|---|---|---|---|---|---|
| 1980 | "Melancholy Fire" (with Norman Connors) | 20 | ― | ― | ― | ― | ― |
| 1983 | "I Am Somebody" | 30 | ― | ― | ― | 43 | ― |
| 1983 | "Keep on Doin'" | 51 | ― | ― | ― | ― | ― |
| 1984 | "Show Me" | 3 | ― | ― | ― | ― | ― |
| 1985 | "Finder of Lost Loves" (with Dionne Warwick) | 47 | ― | ― | 12 | ― | ― |
| 1985 | "Bring Back Your Love" | 18 | ― | ― | ― | ― | ― |
| 1985 | "Everlasting Love" | 85 | ― | ― | ― | ― | ― |
| 1986 | "Giving Myself to You" | 19 | ― | ― | ― | ― | ― |
| 1986 | "Stay" (from the Take It from Me album) | 69 | ― | ― | ― | ― | ― |
| 1987 | "Together" (with Genobia Jeter) | 42 | ― | ― | ― | ― | ― |
| 1987 | "We've Only Just Begun (The Romance Is Not Over)" | 2 | ― | 66 | 36 | ― | 85 |
| 1987 | "Oh Girl" | 38 | ― | ― | ― | ― | ― |
| 1988 | "Living in the Limelight" | 34 | ― | ― | ― | ― | ― |
| 1990 | "Stay" (from the All for You album) | 6 | ― | ― | ― | ― | ― |
| 1990 | "Can We Try Again" | 47 | ― | ― | ― | ― | ― |
| 1991 | "Here I Go Again" | 1 | 12 | ― | ― | ― | ― |
| 1992 | "I've Been Searchin' (Nobody Like You)" | 8 | 14 | ― | ― | ― | ― |
| 1992 | "Good Thang" | 60 | ― | ― | ― | ― | ― |
| 1994 | "Round and Round" | 24 | 29 | ― | ― | ― | ― |
| 1994 | "Here I Am" | 68 | 73 | ― | ― | ― | ― |
| 1994 | "It's Gonna Be Alright" | ― | ― | ― | ― | ― | — |
| 1998 | "Let It Rain" | 65 | ― | ― | ― | ― | ― |
| 1999 | "Baby Come Home" | 80 | 74 | ― | ― | ― | ― |
| 1999 | "I Think It's Time" | ― | ― | ― | ― | ― | ― |
| 2002 | "Feels Good" | ― | ― | ― | ― | ― | ― |
| 2002 | "All That You Need" | ― | ― | ― | ― | ― | ― |
| 2003 | "I Wonder Why" | ― | ― | ― | ― | ― | ― |
| 2013 | "Everyday" | ― | ― | ― | ― | ― | ― |
| 2015 | "Tonight" (Cool Million featuring Glenn Jones) | ― | ― | ― | ― | ― | ― |
| 2018 | "Love by Design" (w/ Regina Belle) | ― | 20 | ― | ― | ― | — |
| 2018 | "You & Me" | ― | ― | ― | ― | ― | ― |
| 2020 | "Trust in Me" (featuring Genobia Jeter) | ― | ― | ― | ― | ― | ― |
| 2022 | "Family Time" (featuring Y'Anna Crawley) | ― | ― | ― | ― | ― | ― |
"—" denotes releases that did not chart or were not released in that territory.

=== Other charted songs ===
List of singles, with selected chart positions
| Title | Year | Peak chart positions | Album |
| Title | Year | SA Radio | Album |
|---|---|---|---|
| "All for You" | 2022 | 2 | All for You |
