= Just Ask Me To =

Single by Tevin Campbell

from the album T.E.V.I.N. and Boyz n the Hood Soundtrack
- B-side: "Hip Hop Mix"
- Released: June 26, 1991
- Recorded: 1991
- Genre: New jack swing
- Length: 4:07
- Label: Qwest/Warner Bros.
- Songwriters: Al B. Sure, Kyle West
- Producers: Al B. Sure, Kyle West

Tevin Campbell singles chronology
"Round and Round" (1990)	"Just Ask Me To" (1991)	"Tell Me What You Want Me to Do" (1991)

"Just Ask Me To" is a song by American R&B Singer Tevin Campbell. It was released in June 1991 as the second single from his debut album T.E.V.I.N. It did well on the R&B chart, reaching number nine, but not as much success on the pop chart, where it peaked at number 88. The song featured rapper Chubb Rock and was also featured on the Boyz n the Hood soundtrack.

== Track listing ==
US Cassette Single

1. Just Ask Me To (Album Version) 4:08
2. Just Ask Me To (Hip Hop Mix) 4:06

== Charts ==
Chart (1991)	Peak position
US Billboard Hot 100	88
US Hot R&B/Hip-Hop Songs (Billboard)	9
