= Could You Learn to Love =

1997 single by Tevin Campbell

Single by Tevin Campbell

from the album Back to the World
- Released: February 18, 1997
- Recorded: 1996
- Genre: R&B
- Length: 4:10
- Label: Qwest
- Songwriter: Kenneth "Babyface" Edmonds
- Producer: The Boom Brothers

Tevin Campbell singles chronology
"I Got It Bad" (1996)	"Could You Learn to Love" (1997)	"Another Way" (1999)

"Could You Learn to Love" is a song by American R&B singer Tevin Campbell. It was written by Kenneth "Babyface" Edmonds for his third studio album Back to the World (1996). Production was helmed by Langston "Chuck Boom" Bryant and Anthony "A-Tone" Bryant under their production moniker The Boom Brothers. The song was issued as the album's third and final single in February 1997.

It peaked at number 73 on the US Billboard Hot R&B/Hip-Hop Songs chart and reached number 38 on the New Zealand Singles Chart.

== Background and release ==
Back to the World was released by Qwest Records in June 1996 and was Campbell's third studio album, following the platinum-selling T.E.V.I.N. (1991) and the double-platinum I'm Ready (1993). The album reached number 46 on the Billboard 200 and number 11 on the Top R&B/Hip-Hop Albums chart, Campbell's first album to miss the top ten of the latter.

The Boom Brothers, the production duo of Langston Bryant and Anthony Bryant, were affiliated with Yab Yum Entertainment, the label and publishing company founded by Tracey Edmonds, and the track was produced for Yab Yum Entertainment and Area 10 Productions.

"Could You Learn to Love" followed the title track, which reached number 16 on the Hot R&B/Hip-Hop Songs chart, and "I Got It Bad", which reached number 41. It was released on February 18, 1997 on CD and cassette single, having been serviced to radio on promotional CD and 12-inch vinyl the previous year.

Campbell largely stepped away from recording after the album. In a 2022 interview with People, he linked a period of personal reflection to the years following Back to the World, which had not performed as he had hoped.

== Critical reception ==
Reviewing the parent album for AllMusic, Stephen Thomas Erlewine described Back to the World as the record on which Campbell returned as an adult performer, calling it proof that the teen idol had matured.

== Music video ==
The official music video for "Could You Learn to Love" was directed by Vaughan Arnell, the British director whose music video work includes George Michael's "Fastlove" and the Spice Girls' "Say You'll Be There".

== Track listings ==
US CD and cassette single

No.	Title	Producer(s)	Length
1.	"Could You Learn to Love" (Album Version)	The Boom Brothers	4:10
2.	"Could You Learn to Love" (Marc Kinchen Remix)	Marc Kinchen (Note: denotes additional producer)	4:10

US promotional 12-inch vinyl

No.	Title	Length
1.	"Could You Learn to Love" (Marc Kinchen Remix)	4:00
2.	"Could You Learn to Love" (Marc Kinchen Remix Instrumental)	3:57
3.	"Could You Learn to Love" (Album Version)	4:08
4.	"Could You Learn to Love" (Album Instrumental)	4:07
5.	"Could You Learn to Love" (A Cappella)	4:04

== Credits and personnel ==
Credits lifted from the liner notes of Back to the World.

- Tevin Campbell – lead vocals
- Kenneth "Babyface" Edmonds – songwriter
- Langston "Chuck Boom" Bryant – producer
- Anthony "A-Tone" Bryant – producer
- Marc Kinchen – remix, additional production

== Charts ==
Weekly chart performance for "Could You Learn to Love"
Chart (1997)	Peak position
New Zealand (Recorded Music NZ)	38
US Hot R&B/Hip-Hop Songs (Billboard)	73

== Release history ==
Release history and formats for "Could You Learn to Love"
Region	Date	Format(s)	Label	Ref.
United States	1996	Promotional CD, 12-inch vinyl	Qwest	
United States	February 18, 1997	CD single, cassette single	Qwest	
