= Round and Round (Tevin Campbell song) =

1990 single written and produced by Prince

Single by Tevin Campbell

from the album Graffiti Bridge and T.E.V.I.N.
- B-side: "Goodbye"
- Released: September 24, 1990
- Recorded: December 1989
- Studio: Paisley Park, Chanhassen, Minnesota
- Genre: R&B
- Length: 4:54
- Label: Qwest/Warner Bros.
- Songwriter: Prince
- Producer: Prince

Tevin Campbell singles chronology
"Tomorrow" (1990)	"Round and Round" (1990)	"Just Ask Me To" (1991)

Graffiti Bridge singles chronology
"Thieves in the Temple" (1990)	"Round and Round" (1990)	"New Power Generation" (1990)

"Round and Round" is the Prince-produced first single from American R&B singer Tevin Campbell's debut album, T.E.V.I.N. (1991). This was Campbell's first solo single, as he was featured in "Tomorrow (A Better You, A Better Me)" alongside music legend Quincy Jones. The song was previously featured on the Graffiti Bridge soundtrack. The hit song was a success on both the pop and R&B charts peaking at No. 12 on the Hot 100 and No. 3 on the US R&B chart.

== Background ==
While specific recording dates are not known, basic tracking took place circa December 1989 at Paisley Park Studios in Chanhassen, Minnesota (during the same sessions that produced "New Power Generation"). The original version of the track, before being remixed by Junior Vasquez, was included as the sixth track on a 1990 configuration of Graffiti Bridge, but when the track was remixed in Spring-Summer 1990, Prince liked the results and included the remixed version on the album. The original version (prior to the remixes) of the song remains unreleased.

"Round And Round" is the first single to be credited to Tevin Campbell. The track is featured in the movie Graffiti Bridge. Soon after the soundtrack’s release, "Round And Round" was released as the album’s second single (and the third in Europe) from Prince’s twelfth album (his only track on the album). It was released five weeks after the album and received a release in the USA and UK only. The b-side was a remix of "Round And Round". In 1991, the Soul Mix Edit of the track was included as the first track on Tevin Campbell’s first album T.E.V.I.N. (sixth track and fifth song on the vinyl release).

== Track listings ==
- US Maxi-CD
1. "Round And Round" (Single Version) 3:56
2. "Round And Round" (Soul Mix Extended) 6:39
3. "Round And Round" (The House) 7:32
4. "Round And Round" (Soul Dub) 5:02
- Europe CD
1. "Round And Round" (Soul Mix Edit) 4:54
2. "Round And Round" (The House) 7:30
3. "Goodbye" (Tevin's Dub – Pt. 1&2) 6:53
4. "Goodbye" (Siddub And Listen) 4:58

=== Recording Personnel ===
- Tevin Campbell - lead vocals
- Prince - all background vocals and instruments, except where noted
- Mark Plati - keyboards
- Remixes by Junior Vasquez

== Charts ==
=== Weekly charts ===
Chart (1990–1992)	Peak position
UK Singles (OCC)	82
UK Dance (Music Week)	40
US Billboard Hot 100	12
US Dance Singles Sales (Billboard)	40
US Hot R&B/Hip-Hop Songs (Billboard)	3

=== Year-end charts ===
Chart (1991)	Position
US Billboard Hot 100	81

== Certifications ==
Region	Certification	Certified units/sales
United States (RIAA)	Gold	500,000^{^}
^{^} Shipments figures based on certification alone.
