= Tomorrow (A Better You, Better Me) =

1976 song by The Brothers Johnson

Instrumental by The Brothers Johnson

from the album Look Out for #1
- Released: 1976
- Length: 2:58
- Label: A&M
- Songwriter: George Johnson, Louis Johnson
- Producer: Quincy Jones

"Tomorrow (A Better You, a Better Me)" is a song originally recorded by the Brothers Johnson as an instrumental in 1976 on the album Look Out for #1.

== Quincy Jones/Tevin Campbell version ==
"Tomorrow (A Better You, Better Me)"

Single by Quincy Jones featuring Tevin Campbell

from the album Back on the Block
- Released: November 10, 1989
- Recorded: 1989
- Genre: R&B
- Length: 4:46
- Label: Qwest
- Songwriters: Siedah Garrett, George Johnson, Louis Johnson
- Producer: Quincy Jones

Quincy Jones singles chronology
"The Secret Garden (Sweet Seduction Suite)" (1990)	"Tomorrow (A Better You, A Better Me)" (1990)	"I Don't Go for That" (1990)

Tevin Campbell singles chronology
"Tomorrow (A Better You, A Better Me)" (1990)	"Round and Round" (1990)

In 1989, Siedah Garrett wrote lyrics to the song, and it was recorded by Quincy Jones featuring Tevin Campbell on vocals for the album Back on the Block. The new version of the song spent one week at number one on the US R&B chart and peaked at number seventy-five on the US pop chart in June 1990. It was Campbell's first number-one R&B single and first single to enter the Billboard Hot 100.

=== Personnel ===
- Tevin Campbell – Lead Vocals
- McKinley Brown – Background Vocals
- Kenneth Ford – Background Vocals
- Jaimee Foxworth – Background Vocals
- Siedah Garrett – Choir Director
- Rose Banks – Choir Director
- Chad Durio – Background Vocals
- Alex Harris – Background Vocals
- Reginale Green – Background Vocals
- Charity Young – Background Vocals
- Shane Shoaf – Background Vocals
- Tyren Perry – Background Vocals
- Tiffany Johnson – Background Vocals
- Donovan McCrary – Background Vocals
- Salim Grant – Guitar
- Jerry Hey – Arranger
- Gerald Albright – Alto saxophone solo
- Steve Lukather – Guitar
- Ollie Brown – Percussion
- John Robinson – Drums
- Bruce Swedien – Recording Engineer, Mixing
- Brad Sundberg – Technical Director, additional engineering
- Bill Summers – hindewhu
- Randy Kerber – Keyboards, Bass Synth
- Greg Phillinganes – Fender Rhodes
- Rod Temperton – Arranger
- Quincy Jones – Arranger

In 1990, smooth jazz musician Nelson Rangell covered the song from his self-titled album.

== See also ==
- R&B number-one hits of 1990 (USA)
