= Tevin Campbell =

American singer (born 1976)

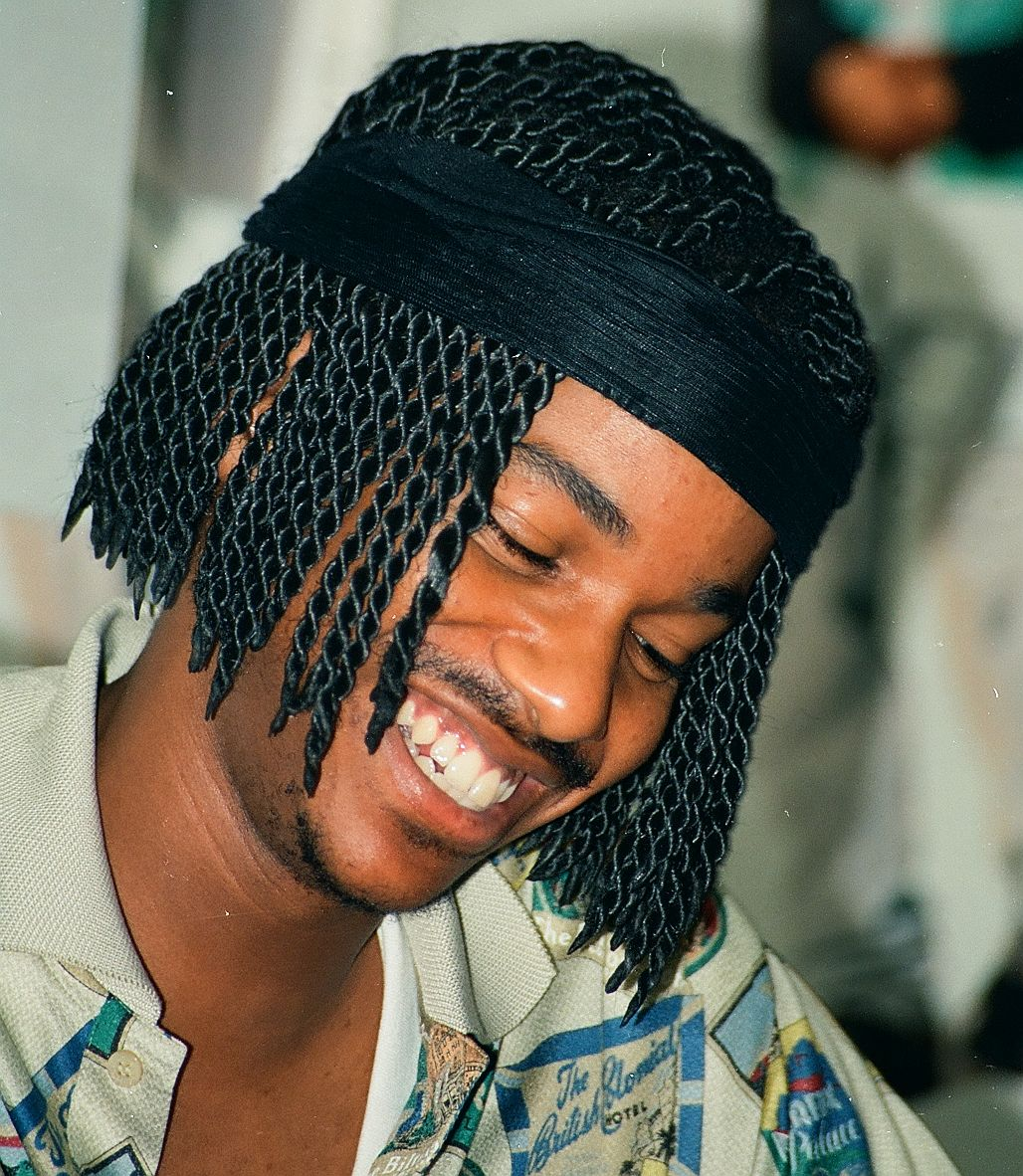
- Campbell in 1996

Background information
- Born: Tevin Jermod Campbell; November 12, 1976 (age 50); Waxahachie, Texas, U.S.
- Origin: Dallas, Texas, U.S.
- Genres: R&B; soul; pop; new jack swing
- Occupations: Singer; songwriter; musician
- Years active: 1988–present
- Labels: Spectra; Qwest; Warner Bros.

Tevin Jermod Campbell (born November 12, 1976) is an American singer, songwriter, and musician. He performed gospel in his local church from an early age. Following an audition for jazz musician Bobbi Humphrey in 1988, Campbell was signed to Warner Bros. Records. In 1989, Campbell collaborated with Quincy Jones performing lead vocals for "Tomorrow" on Jones' album Back on the Block and released his Platinum-selling debut album, T.E.V.I.N. The album included his highest-charting single to date, "Tell Me What You Want Me to Do", peaking at number 6 on the Billboard Hot 100. The debut album also included the singles "Alone With You" (produced by Al B. Sure and Kyle West, with background vocals by K-Ci and JoJo from Jodeci), and "Goodbye".

Campbell's double-Platinum-selling second album, I'm Ready, released in 1993, included two high-charting songs penned by Babyface: "Can We Talk" peaked at number nine on the Hot 100 and number one on the Billboard R&B charts, and the album's title track "I'm Ready", which also peaked at number nine on the Billboard Hot 100. In 1996, Campbell released his third album, Back to the World, which was not as commercially or critically successful as his first two releases. His fourth album, Tevin Campbell, was released in 1999, but performed poorly on the Billboard's 200 charts.

As an actor, Campbell appeared in Prince's film Graffiti Bridge and made guest appearances on The Fresh Prince of Bel-Air and Moesha television programs. He voiced fictional pop star Powerline in Disney's 1995 animated film A Goofy Movie, in which he provided vocals for the film's songs "Stand Out" and "I2I". He appeared as Seaweed in the Broadway musical Hairspray in 2005. Campbell has earned five Grammy Award nominations, and he has certified sales of five million records in the United States, according to the Recording Industry Association of America.

== Early life ==
Campbell was born in Waxahachie, Texas, the second child of Rhonda Byrd, a former postal worker who eventually became his manager. He has an elder sister, Marche, and a younger brother, Damario. His father left the family shortly after the birth of his brother. Campbell and his father would not meet again until he was 15 years old. With his mother being a member of the choir at Joshua Chapel A.M.E., a church in Waxahachie, Campbell began singing gospel music at an early age, first in the choir and then as a soloist. At the age of 12, a family friend had him sing to jazz singer Bobbi Humphrey who arranged for him to perform at a videotaped showcase in Manhattan. Manager Benny Medina discovered the tape and flew to Texas to sign Campbell shortly thereafter. The family then relocated to Encino, Los Angeles where Campbell attended a private school in Sherman Oaks neighborhood.

== Career ==
Medina consulted Quincy Jones to work with Campbell. In 1989, he made his debut on Jones' single "Tomorrow (A Better You, Better Me)" which reached number one on the Billboard Hot R&B/Hip Hop Singles chart in June 1990. "Tomorrow" was a vocal version of a 1976 instrumental by The Brothers Johnson and was the lead single from Jones' ensemble album Back on the Block, which won the Grammy Award for Album of the Year in 1991. After working with Jones and writers and producers including Siedah Garrett, Campbell worked with producers Narada Michael Walden, Al B. Sure, Babyface, and others to record additional music. Campbell's first solo hit was "Round and Round", which charted at number 3 on the R&B chart in November 1990 and 12 on the Billboard Hot 100 in April 1991. "Round and Round" was produced by Prince and was featured in Prince's film Graffiti Bridge. After his appearance in the 1990 film Graffiti Bridge, Campbell made a guest appearance the following year on The Fresh Prince of Bel-Air, playing fictional teen idol, "Little T", a celebrity crush and date of Ashley's in the first-season episode, "Just Infatuation". He was also referenced in two later episodes. Will threatened to destroy Ashley's Tevin Campbell posters after she used Will's autographed Willie Mays baseball, cleaning off Mays' signature, for batting practice and schemed to use Tevin as part of a publicity stunt to promote Ashley's music career. The song, "Round and Round" earned Campbell a Grammy Award nomination at the 33rd Grammy Awards for Best Male R&B Vocal Performance but lost to Luther Vandross for "Here and Now".

=== 1991–1992: T.E.V.I.N. and early success ===
Campbell followed the success of his first two singles by releasing his debut album, T.E.V.I.N., in November 1991 which featured the R&B hit singles and Campbell's number 1 R&B hit: "Tell Me What You Want Me to Do" followed by "Alone with You", and "Goodbye". T.E.V.I.N. reached number 38 on Billboard 200 chart and 5 on the Top R&B/Hip-Hop Albums chart. The album eventually was certified Platinum by the RIAA for selling 1 million copies in the United States. T.E.V.I.N. earned Campbell a Grammy Award nomination for Best Male R&B Vocal Performance at the 35th Grammy Awards but lost to Al Jarreau for his album Heaven and Earth. The album was produced by Jones, Al B. Sure! and Narada Michael Walden among others. Between interviews and television appearances following the release of T.E.V.I.N., he contributed to three special projects: Handel's Messiah: A Soulful Celebration, a Grammy Award-winning album produced by Mervyn Warren of Take 6; A Very Special Christmas 2 album, featuring Campbell's rendition of "Oh Holy Night"; and Barcelona Gold, the 1992 Olympics album which includes his hit "One Song".

=== 1993–1995: I'm Ready and further success ===
Campbell's second album, I'm Ready, was also executive-produced by Jones and Medina. "I wanted to make a more mature-sounding album to reflect my current state of mind," Campbell explained to J. R. Reynolds in Billboard magazine. "I'm Ready says a lot about who I am as a person because of the things I've been through during the last four years or so. I hope people will see that I'm not the same young kid that I was on my first album." The album was produced by Babyface, among others. I'm Ready, released October 1993, yielded the singles "Can We Talk", which peaked at number 9 on the Billboard Hot 100 and number 1 on Billboard's R&B chart; "I'm Ready", also a number 9 hit on the Hot 100 and number 2 on the R&B chart; and "Always in My Heart", which peaked at number 20 and number 6, respectively. He also scored a Top 30 R&B hit with a fourth single, "Don't Say Goodbye Girl". The album was released on October 26, 1993, and went on to reach number 18 on the Billboard 200 and number 3 on the Top R&B/Hip-Hop Albums chart. The album was certified double Platinum by the Recording Industry Association of America for selling 2 million copies in the United States. To date I'm Ready is Campbell's biggest selling album and many considered this album to be the high mark of his career despite the fact he was only 16 when he recorded the album. The album was nominated for three Grammy Awards: Best Male R&B Vocal Performance for "Can We Talk" at the 36th Grammy Awards (which he lost to Ray Charles for "A Song for You") and Best Male R&B Vocal Performance for "I'm Ready" (which he lost to Babyface for "When Can I See You") along with Best R&B Album for I'm Ready (which he lost to Boyz II Men for their album II) both at the 37th Grammy Awards.In November 1994, Campbell was featured on the soundtrack to the film, A Low Down Dirty Shame singing "Gotta Get Yo' Groove On" produced by Jimmy Jam & Terry Lewis. In September 1994, Campbell also scored an R&B hit with the single "U Will Know" as part of the R&B super-group Black Men United, a group that also included singer Usher. During the time span of 1993 to 1995, Campbell performed as an opening act on select dates during the summer of Janet Jackson's Janet World Tour. In 1995, Campbell voiced the character Powerline in Disney's animated film A Goofy Movie, performing the songs "I 2 I" (also styled as "Eye to Eye") and "Stand Out" for the film's soundtrack. Campbell appeared alongside female recording artist Brandy on the September 28, 1995, episode of NY Undercover called "Digital Underground.Com" singing "The Closer I Get to You".

=== 1996–1998: Back to the World ===
Campbell's third album, Back to the World, featuring production by Sean Combs, was released in 1996. It reached number 46 on the Billboard 200 chart and 11 on the Top R&B/Hip-Hop Albums chart. In terms of sales, Back to the World was a disappointment compared to his first two albums, despite being certified gold. The album's first single, "Back to the World", was a moderate hit, reaching number 47 on the Billboard 200 chart and 14 on the R&B charts becoming a moderate hit. However, the other two singles did not even reach the Hot 100, "I Got It Bad" and "Could You Learn to Love" only managed to reach the R&B charts with very low peak positions. Also in 1996, Campbell sung a cover of the song, "The Impossible Dream", on the compilation album Rhythm of the Games: 1996 Olympic Games Album. Campbell also contributed a recording of the song "One Hand, One Heart" to the album The Songs of West Side Story, which also featured contributions from Selena, Aretha Franklin, Phil Collins, Patti LaBelle, Natalie Cole, Sheila E. and All-4-One.

=== 1999–2002: Fourth album, arrest and hiatus ===
On February 23, 1999, Campbell released his self-titled fourth album. It found Campbell venturing into the neo-soul venue. The project was rushed and as a result, it charted below the R&B Top 30, with only one single charting, a Top 30 song called "Another Way". The album has collaborations with Wyclef Jean, Faith Evans, David Foster, and SWV lead singer Coko. In 1999, Campbell made another guest appearance on the hit show Moesha, starring Brandy, in the episode "The Rite Stuff".In July 1999, Campbell was arrested after soliciting a lewd act from an undercover police officer during a sting operation in Van Nuys, California. The sting operation was reportedly conducted in an area where there had been numerous complaints from the public about cruising and solicitation. According to police reports, Campbell was also in possession of a small amount of marijuana at the time of his arrest. In 2001, Campbell released the compilation album The Best of Tevin Campbell.

=== 2003–2008: Broadway and shelved albums ===
Through 2004, Campbell had still not made a public appearance and kept a low profile. However, in 2005, he appeared in the Broadway musical Hairspray as the character Seaweed J. Stubbs. Campbell later reprised his role of Seaweed in the Broadway play in the Melbourne and Sydney productions in Australia. He worked with the production up until 2011. In May 2008, Campbell released an album titled 2008, Never Before Heard as a digital download, composed of material recorded in 2002, but removed it from digital stores six months later. In early 2009, record producer Narada Michael Walden said that Campbell was working on new material to be released in early 2009. However, nothing was ever released. Also in 2009, Campbell made an appearance at the BET Awards 2009 as he paid tribute to The O'Jays with Trey Songz, Tyrese, and Johnny Gill. In May 2010, Campbell performed on The Mo'Nique Show. He said that many people wanted him to work again on music and he was thinking about a comeback. In November 2010, he was featured on the remake of a song by Quincy Jones called "Secret Garden". The remake featured Usher, Robin Thicke, Tyrese Gibson, LL Cool J and Barry White. TV One's show Life After featured Campbell's life and career, as well as updates on his comeback. From 2011 to 2012, Campbell made small appearances here and there. In 2013, Campbell performed a concert called Tevin Campbell in Cape Town and was a part of Divos Tour 2013 both in South Africa as well as traveling to London to perform at The O2 Arena and also performed at the One Man, One Nation, One Celebration memorial service in honor and tribute to Nelson Mandela held at FNB Stadium.

=== 2014–present: Return to music and television ===
On June 14, 2014, Campbell performed a concert at B.B. King's Blues Club and Grill in New York called An Evening with Tevin Campbell and received positive reviews. It was officially announced that he was working on a new album with collaborations from producer Teddy Riley, singer Faith Evans and rapper T-Pain. On July 5, Campbell performed at the 2014 Essence Music Festival in New Orleans. The performance garnered great reviews. Campbell appeared on a track called "Let it Flow" with Naturi Naughton from the Full Force album With Love from Our Friends which was released on August 26, 2014. In November, it was announced that Campbell had signed with Spectra Music Group. On August 14, 2015, Campbell appeared at the Anaheim Convention Center in Anaheim, California for a rare performance of his song "I 2 I" from the A Goofy Movie soundtrack at the end of A Goofy Movie cast reunion held during the fourth annual D23 Expo. On September 29, Campbell was featured on a remake of the song, "Maybe Tomorrow", originally recorded by The Jackson 5. The song was featured on jazz musician Aaron Bing's ninth studio album, Awakening. On November 29, 2015, Campbell performed his song "Can We Talk" while Kenneth "Babyface" Edmonds played piano as a part of a tribute dedicated to Edmonds who was honored with the Legend Award at the 2015 Soul Train Music Awards. The tribute included Brandy, Fantasia Barrino, Boyz II Men, Bobby Brown and Babyface himself, which included some of the hit songs that he wrote. Campbell released a new single from his fifth album entitled, "Safer on the Ground" via iTunes and Google Play. The song served as a buzz single and was available for free streaming a day earlier on SoundCloud. When asked about the new album in an interview with Jet magazine website, Campbell told the interviewer that the song reminded him of a modern-day "Tell Me What You Want Me to Do". In the interview, Campbell also stated that the song is a love song about a broken heart, but to him it represents being humble and safe, speaking of the disappointment with music business during the early stages of his career. Campbell stated that he doesn't agree with the new sound of current R&B music and wants his music to be "authentic". On March 19, 2019, Campbell revealed he would appear on the fourth season of the OWN scripted drama series Queen Sugar in a surprise video posted to the show's Facebook page from the set. The news came months after director Ava DuVernay tweeted that she was "rebuking any Tevin Campbell slander from millennials and plotting to write him into an episode of Queen Sugar somehow. On general principle."

== Artistry ==
Campbell is an altino countertenor with an almost four-octave vocal range. His vocal range spans from E2 to D6 in the song "Tell Me What You Want Me to Do". Early in his career, he was frequently compared to Michael Jackson for his "smooth ... vocals and impressive range", which Campbell later said put undue pressure on him, despite being a "big compliment".

== Personal life ==
In 2018, Campbell denied a "long-standing rumor" that Quincy Jones sexually assaulted him as a minor, calling the rumor "disgusting". In 2020, he denied Jaguar Wright's claim that he was "prostituting himself for drugs" and threatened to sue her for defamation.

Also in 2018, Campbell expressed frustration at ongoing speculation over his sexuality. In March 2022, he quote-tweeted a Twitter user's list of singers her mother thought were gay, replying, "Tevin is" with pride flag and sunglasses emoji. He later deleted the tweet. In an interview with People that August, Campbell confirmed that he was gay and noted that although he had come out to his family at age 19, he had not understood his sexuality until after leaving the music business, which had left him without "time to process any of that".

== Discography ==
Studio albums

- T.E.V.I.N. (1991)
- I'm Ready (1993)
- Back to the World (1996)
- Tevin Campbell (1999)

== Filmography ==
Filmography of Tevin Campbell
Year	Title	Role	Notes
1989	Wally and the Valentines	Russell Valentine	TV movie
1990	Graffiti Bridge	Tevin	
1991	The Fresh Prince of Bel-Air	Little T	Episode: "Just Infatuation"
1995	A Goofy Movie	Powerline	Voice (uncredited)
1995	New York Undercover	Himself	Episode: "Digital Underground"
1997	The Parent 'Hood	Himself	Episode: "Rappin' It Up"
1999	Moesha	Kevin	Episode: "The Rite Stuff"
2019	Queen Sugar	Cousin Junior	Episode: "Pleasure Is Black"

== Awards and nominations ==
Year	Award	Category	Recipient	Result
1990	Young Artist Award	Favorite New Recording Artist	"Round and Round"	Won
1991	Grammy Award	Best Rhythm & Blues Vocal Performance – Male	"Round and Round"	Nominated
1991	Young Artist Award	Best Young Actor Guest-Starring or Recurring Role in a TV Series	The Fresh Prince of Bel-Air	Nominated
1993	American Music Award	Favorite Male Artist – Soul/Rhythm & Blues	Himself	Nominated
1993	Soul Train Music Award	Best R&B/Soul Album – Male	T.E.V.I.N.	Nominated
1993	Grammy Award	Best Rhythm & Blues Vocal Performance – Male	T.E.V.I.N.	Nominated
1994	Soul Train Music Award	Best R&B Single, Male	"Can We Talk"	Won
1994	Soul Train Music Award	R&B Album of the Year - Male	I'm Ready	Nominated
1994	Grammy Award	Best Rhythm & Blues Vocal Performance – Male	"Can We Talk"	Nominated
1995	Grammy Award	Best Rhythm & Blues Vocal Performance – Male	"I'm Ready"	Nominated
1995	Grammy Award	Best Rhythm & Blues Album	I'm Ready	Nominated
1995	American Music Award	Favorite Male Artist – Soul/Rhythm & Blues	Himself	Nominated
2022	Black Music Honors	R&B Icon Award	Himself	Honored
2023	11th Queerties Awards	Closet Door Bustdown	Himself	Nominated
