= Qwest Records =

American record label

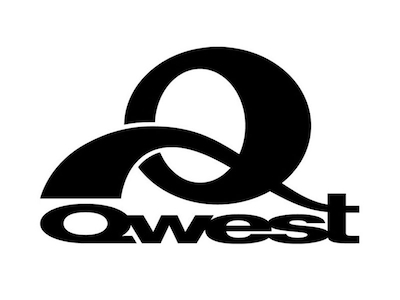
- Parent company: Warner Music Group
- Founded: 1980
- Founder: Quincy Jones
- Defunct: 2000
- Status: Absorbed into Warner Records
- Distributors: Warner Records; Interscope Records (select re-releases)
- Genre: Various
- Country of origin: U.S.

Qwest Records was an American record label run by Quincy Jones.

== History ==
Qwest Records was established by Quincy Jones in 1980 as a joint venture with Warner Bros. Records, although Jones remained under contract with A&M Records until 1981. The first release on Qwest was George Benson's 1980 album, Give Me the Night, shared with Warner Bros. Records, as Benson was under contract with it. Patti Austin, Jones's goddaughter, was one of the first artists to sign with Qwest, and the label released her album Every Home Should Have One in 1981.

While Qwest Records primarily catered to the R&B market, it also welcomed a diverse range of artists. This included Frank Sinatra (whom Jones produced in the 1960s), Tevin Campbell, Radiance, and the British alternative dance group New Order (formerly known as Joy Division, its earlier post-punk incarnation). Jones told NME in a May 1990 interview:

I'm so honored that New Order picked my label to go on in the US—it really flattered me. They're beautiful people.

In the 1990s, Qwest Records demonstrated its adaptability by venturing into the burgeoning hip-hop music scene, signing Saafir. It discovered and nurtured R&B artist Tamia, who went on to enjoy a successful career. The label also signed the gospel group the Winans in 1985 and Táta Vega, who released Now I See through Qwest. Robert Stewart, a performer on the Pulitzer Prize-winning Wynton Marsalis recording Blood on the Fields, was signed to the label in 1994. His two albums for Qwest, In the Gutta and The Force, were met with critical acclaim.

Qwest was absorbed by Warner Bros. Records in 2000, with its roster of artists either transferred to its parent label (or its sister labels) or dropped. The Warner Music Group currently owns the Qwest catalogue. In 2006, select titles by Jones were licensed to Universal Music Group for distribution and reissues. Jones himself died on November 3, 2024.

== See also ==
- List of record labels
