= Stomp: The Best of the Brothers Johnson =

Greatest hits album by The Brothers Johnson
- Released: August 6, 2013
- Genre: Soul; funk; disco
- Length: 2:31:02
- Label: UMG

The Brothers Johnson chronology
Strawberry Letter 23: The Best of the Brothers Johnson (2003)	Stomp: The Best of the Brothers Johnson (2013)

Professional ratings
Review scores
Source	Rating
AllMusic	4.5/5 stars

Stomp: The Best of the Brothers Johnson is a compilation album by The Brothers Johnson, released in 2013.

== Critical reception ==
Andy Kellman of Allmusic.com found this to be the best compilation of the group's work: "Going back to 1987's Classics, Vol. 11, there has been a handful of decent single-disc Brothers Johnson anthologies. Through 2012, the group still lacked a double-disc compilation to do proper justice to its catalog. A couple minor issues aside, Stomp: The Best of the Brothers Johnson -- released through Universal U.K.'s Spectrum division in 2013 -- is an ideal overview."

== Track listing ==
=== Disc one ===
1. "Get the Funk Out Ma Face" (George Johnson, Louis Johnson, Quincy Jones) – 6:00
2. "I'll Be Good to You" (George Johnson, Louis Johnson, Senora Sam) – 4:46
3. "Free and Single" (George Johnson, Louis Johnson) – 4:09
4. "Land of Ladies" (George Johnson, Henry George Johnson, Louis Johnson) – 4:32
5. "Right On Time" (Henry George Johnson, Louis E. Johnson, Quincy Jones) – 3:38
6. "Free Yourself, Be Yourself" (George Henry Johnson, Louis E. Johnson) – 4:13
7. "Love Is" (Henry George Johnson, Louis E. Johnson, Peggy Ann Jones, Quincy Jones) – 4:21
8. "Ain't We Funkin' Now" (Tom Bahler, Louis Johnson, Valerie Johnson, Quincy Jones, Alex Weir) – 5:39
9. "Ride-O-Rocket" (Nickolas Ashford, Valerie Simpson) – 4:42
10. "Street Wave" (Alex Mckay Weir, Louis E. Johnson, Jerome R. Hey, Wayne Lee Vaughn) – 5:07
11. "Mista' Cool" (Ed Eckstine, Louis Johnson, Larry Williams) – 3:29
12. "Blam" (Tom Bahler, David W. Foster, Henry George Johnson, Louis E. Johnson, Quincy Jones, Alex Mckay Weir) – 4:55
13. "Closer to the One That You Love" (Henry George Johnson, Louis E. Johnson, Rod Temperton) – 3:12
14. "Thunder Thumbs and Lightnin' Licks" (Dave Grusin, George Johnson, Louis Johnson, Paul Riser) – 4:51
15. "Runnin' for Your Lovin'" (George Johnson, Louis Johnson) – 5:06
16. "Strawberry Letter 23" (Shuggie Otis) – 5:02

=== Disc Two ===
1. "Stomp!" (George Johnson, Louis Johnson, Valerie Johnson, Rod Temperton) – 6:00
2. "Light Up the Night" (George Johnson, Louis Johnson, Rod Temperton) – 3:48
3. "Treasure" (Rod Temperton) – 4:11
4. "Smilin' On Ya" (Louis Johnson, Jerry Hey, Gregory Arthur Phillinganes, Arthur Bergh, Jerome R. Hey) – 3:42
5. "The Real Thing" (George Johnson, Louis Johnson) – 3:54
6. "Teaser" (Henry George Johnson) – 3:49
7. "Welcome to the Club" (Louis Johnson, Valerie Johnson) – 4:31
8. "Funk It (Funkadelala)" (Louis Johnson, Valerie Johnson) – 4:08
9. "I'm Giving You All Of My Love" (Henry George Johnson, Eddie Noble) – 4:46
10. "The Great Awakening" (Henry George Johnson, John Sculler) – 5:31
11. "P.O. Box 2000 (Instrumental)" (Louis E. Johnson, George Henry Johnson) – 4:28
12. "Real Love" (Bryan Loren) – 4:37
13. "Dazed" (Louis E. Johnson, George Henry Johnson) – 4:24
14. "You Keep Me Comin' Back" (12" Special Remixed Version) (Ricky Smith, Leon Sylvers Jr, Dana Marshall, Wardell Potts Jr.) – 6:19
15. "Do You" (Henry George Johnson, Louis Johnson) – 3:24
16. "I Came Here to Party" (Terry Murphy, Pamela Phillips Oland, Wilmer Raglin Jr., Racine Sherman) – 4:14
17. "Kick It to the Curb" (12" version) (Irene Cara, Henry George Johnson) – 5:51
- Disc 1, Tracks 1–4, 14 from Look Out for #1 (1976)
- Disc 1, Tracks 5–7, 15–16 from Right on Time (1977)
- Disc 1, Tracks 8–12 from Blam! (1978)
- Disc 1, Track 13, Disc 2, Tracks 1–4 from Light Up the Night (1980)
- Disc 2, Tracks 5–6 from Winners (1981)
- Disc 2, Tracks 7–10 from Blast!: The Latest and the Greatest (1982)
- Disc 2, Tracks 11–12, 17 from Kickin' (1988)
- Disc 2, Track 13–16 from Out of Control (1984)
