= Back on the Block =

Studio album by Quincy Jones
- Released: November 21, 1989
- Recorded: 1988–1989
- Studio: Record One (Los Angeles); Lighthouse (Los Angeles); Westlake Audio (Los Angeles); Digital Recorders (Nashville); Tarpan (San Rafael, California)
- Genre: R&B; hip hop; new jack swing; jazz
- Length: 57:54
- Label: Qwest; Warner Bros.
- Producer: Quincy Jones

Quincy Jones chronology
The Dude (1981)	Back on the Block (1989)	Q's Jook Joint (1995)

Singles from Back on the Block
- 1. "I'll Be Good To You" Released: December 7, 1989; 2. "The Secret Garden (Sweet Seduction Suite)" Released: 1990; 3. "Tomorrow (A Better You, A Better Me)" Released: April 26, 1990; 4. "I Don't Go For That" Released: August 8, 1990; 5. "The Places You'll Find Love" Released: October 3, 1990; 6. "Wee B. Doinit" Released: May 17, 1991; 7. "Back on the Block" Released: 1991 (UK ONLY)

Professional ratings
Review scores
Source	Rating
AllMusic	4/5 stars
Robert Christgau	B+
Los Angeles Times	3.5/5 stars
The Rolling Stone Album Guide	4/5 stars

Back on the Block is a 1989 studio album by Quincy Jones. The album features musicians and singers from across three generations, including Ella Fitzgerald, Miles Davis, Joe Zawinul, Ice-T, Big Daddy Kane, Sarah Vaughan, Dizzy Gillespie, George Benson, Luther Vandross, Dionne Warwick, Barry White, Chaka Khan, Take 6, Bobby McFerrin, Al Jarreau, Al B. Sure!, James Ingram, El DeBarge, Ray Charles and a 13-year-old Tevin Campbell.

== Overview ==
Multiple singles were lifted from the album and found success on pop and R&B radio, including "I'll Be Good to You", "I Don't Go for That", "The Secret Garden (Sweet Seduction Suite)", and "Tomorrow (A Better You, Better Me)", which was originally an instrumental track on the Brothers Johnson's Look Out for #1 set. "Tomorrow" is also noteworthy for introducing a young Tevin Campbell to the music scene. Back on the Block won the 1991 Grammy Award for Album of the Year. Jones' track "Setembro", by Brazilian composers Gilson Peranzzetta and Ivan Lins, was featured on the soundtrack of the 1991 film Boyz n the Hood. Back on the Block topped the R&B Albums chart for twelve weeks, and topped the Contemporary Jazz Albums chart as well.

=== Ella Fitzgerald and Sarah Vaughan ===
Back on the Block featured the last studio recordings of jazz singers Ella Fitzgerald and Sarah Vaughan.

Fitzgerald and Jones had previously worked together on her 1963 album with Count Basie, Ella and Basie!. Jones had produced three albums with Sarah Vaughan when they both worked for Mercury Records.

== Grammy Awards ==
At the 33rd Grammy Awards, Back on the Block won seven Grammy Awards, including the Grammy Award for Album of the Year.

In arranging, Jerry Hey, Quincy Jones, Ian Prince and Rod Temperton won the Grammy Award for Best Instrumental Arrangement for "Birdland", and Glen Ballard, Hey, Jones and Clif Magness won the Grammy Award for Best Instrumental Arrangement Accompanying Vocal(s) for "The Places You Find Love".

Jones also won the Grammy Award for Best Jazz Fusion Performance for "Birdland", and the Grammy Award for Producer of the Year, Non-Classical.

Bruce Swedien won the Grammy Award for Best Engineered Album, Non-Classical for his work on the album.

Ray Charles and Chaka Khan won the Grammy Award for Best R&B Performance by a Duo or Group with Vocal for "I'll Be Good to You".

The Grammy Award for Best Rap Performance by a Duo or Group went to Big Daddy Kane, Ice-T, Kool Moe Dee, Melle Mel, Quincy Jones III and Jones for "Back on the Block".

== Track listing ==
All tracks produced by Quincy Jones and Rod Temperton. ”Tomorrow (A Better You, A Better Me)” co-produced by Jerry Hey.

#	Title	Writer(s)	Arranger(s)	Time
1	"Prologue (2Q's Rap)"	Big Daddy Kane, Quincy Jones		1:04
2	"Back on the Block"	Jones, Rod Temperton, Siedah Garrett, Caiphus Semenya, Ice-T, Melle Mel, Kool Moe Dee, Big Daddy Kane	Rhythm by Quincy Jones, QD III, Rod Temperton & Bill Summers; Vocals by Quincy Jones & Andraé Crouch	6:34
3	"I Don't Go for That"	Ian Prince	Rhythm & Vocals by Ian Prince	5:11
4	"I'll Be Good to You"	George Johnson, Louis Johnson, Sonora Sam	Rhythm & Vocals by Quincy Jones	4:54
5	"The Verb To Be (Introduction to Wee B. Dooinit)"	Mervyn Warren		0:29
6	"Wee B. Dooinit (Acapella Party by the Human Bean Band)"	Jones, Garrett, Ian Prince	Rhythm by Quincy Jones & Ian Prince; Vocals by Quincy Jones, Ian Prince, Siedah Garrett, Mark Kibble & Rod Temperton	3:34
7	"The Places You Find Love"	Glen Ballard, Clif Magness; Swahili Lyrics by Caiphus Semenya	Rhythm Originally by Quincy Jones, Clif Magness & Glen Ballard; Vocals by Quincy Jones, Andraé Crouch & Caiphus Semenya	6:25
8	"Jazz Corner of the Word (Introduction to "Birdland")" (Note: Though both "Jazz Corner of the Word" and "Jazz Corner of the World" are listed, the former is the one shown on the album cover and is the only one with listed performers.)	Big Daddy Kane, Kool Moe Dee	Rhythm by Quincy Jones & Bill Summers	2:54
9	"Birdland”	Joe Zawinul	Rhythm by Quincy Jones, Rod Temperton & Ian Prince; Horns by Quincy Jones & Jerry Hey	5:33
10	"Setembro (Brazilian Wedding Song)"	Ivan Lins, Gilson Peranzzetta	Rhythm by Quincy Jones & Greg Phillinganes; Vocals by Quincy Jones & Mark Kibble	5:05
11	"One Man Woman"	Garrett, Ian Prince, Harriet Roberts	Rhythm by Quincy Jones & Ian Prince	3:44
12	"Tomorrow (A Better You, Better Me)"	Music by George Johnson, Louis Johnson; Lyrics by Siedah Garrett	Rhythm by Quincy Jones & Jerry Hey; Vocals by Quincy Jones & Rod Temperton	4:46
13	"Prelude to the Garden"	Jorge Calandrelli	Synth Strings by Jorge Calandrelli	0:54
14	"The Secret Garden (Sweet Seduction Suite)"	Jones, Temperton, Garrett, El DeBarge	Rhythm by Quincy Jones & Rod Temperton; Vocals by Quincy Jones, Siedah Garrett & Rod Temperton; Synthesizer by Jerry Hey	6:41

== Personnel ==
Adapted credits from the liner notes of Back on the Block.

- Quincy Jones – lead vocals (track 1), choir conductor (7), handclaps (2, 6, 9), drums (6), drum machine (2), M1 pads (10)
- Gerald Albright – alto saxophone solo (tracks 10, 12)
- Nadirah Ali – background vocals (track 3)
- Maxi Anderson – background vocals (track 7)
- George Benson – guitar solo (tracks 8–10)
- Peggi Blu – sampled background vocals (track 7)
- Michael Boddicker – drum machine (track 2), M1 pads (10), synth pads (10), synth programming (4, 7, 9)
- McKinley Brown – background vocals (track 12)
- Ollie E. Brown – percussion (track 12)
- Jorge Calandrelli – synth strings (track 13)
- Tevin Campbell – lead vocals (tracks 2, 12)
- Ray Charles – lead vocals (track 4)
- Paulinho da Costa – percussion (track 10, sampled on 7)
- Andraé Crouch – vocal arranger, choir conductor, background vocals (tracks 2, 7)
- Sandra Crouch – choir conductor (track 2), background vocals (2, 7)
- Miles Davis – trumpet solo (tracks 8–9)
- El DeBarge – lead and background vocals (track 14)
- George Duke – keyboard solo (track 10, 11)
- Chad Durio – backing vocals (track 12)
- Sheila E. – timbales solo (track 11)
- Nathan East – bass guitar (track 9)
- Geary Lanier Faggett – background vocals (track 7)
- Vonciele Faggett – background vocals (tracks 2, 7)
- Ella Fitzgerald – lead vocals (tracks 6, 8–9)
- Kenneth Ford – background vocals (track 12)
- Jania Foxworth – background vocals (track 12)
- Siedah Garrett – lead vocals (tracks 3, 6–7, 11), background vocals (tracks 3, 11, 14, sampled on 7, additional on 4), choir director (12)
- Tammi Gibson – background vocals (tracks 2, 7)
- Dizzy Gillespie – trumpet solo (tracks 8–9)
- James Gilstrap – background vocals (track 4)
- J. C. Gomez – African percussion (track 2)
- Jackie Gouche – background vocals (track 7)
- Gary Grant – trumpet (track 9)
- Reginale Green – background vocals (track 12)
- Herbie Hancock – keyboard solo (tracks 3, 7, 10), synth pads (10)
- Alex Harris (a.k.a. Otherwize) – background vocals (track 12)
- Howard Hewett – sampled background vocals (track 7)
- Jerry Hey – trumpet (track 9), additional keyboards (7)
- Jennifer Holliday – sampled background vocals (track 7)
- Pattie Howard – sampled background vocals (track 7)
- Ice-T – rap (track 2)
- James Ingram – lead vocals (track 14), additional background vocals (4), sampled background vocals (7)
- Jesse Jackson – narrator (track 2)
- Paul Jackson Jr. – sampled guitar (track 7)
- Al Jarreau – vocals (track 6)
- George Johnson – guitar (track 4), sampled background vocals (4)
- Louis Johnson – Moog synth bass (tracks 2, 4), bass guitar (2, 4, sampled on 7), sampled background vocals (4)
- Tiffany Johnson – background vocals (track 12)
- Jean Johnson-McRath – background vocals (tracks 2, 7)
- Big Daddy Kane – rap (vocals) (tracks 2, 8)
- Randy Kerber – keyboards (track 12), sampled keyboards (7), sampled synthesizer (7), synth bass (12)
- Chaka Khan – lead vocals (tracks 4, 7)
- Michael Landau – sampled guitar (track 7)
- Rhett Lawrence – Fairlight bass and analog guitar synthesizer (track 7)
- Edie Lehman – background vocals (tracks 6, 7)
- Steve Lukather – guitar (tracks 12, 14)
- Clif Magness – sampled background vocals (track 7)
- Harvey Mason Sr. – drums (track 4)
- Donovan McCrary – background vocals (track 12)
- Howard McCrary – background vocals (tracks 2, 7)
- Bobby McFerrin – vocals, additional percussion (track 6)
- Melle Mel – rap (track 2)
- Kool Moe Dee – rap (tracks 2, 8)
- James Moody – alto saxophone solo (tracks 8–9)
- Perry Morgan – background vocals (tracks 2, 7)
- David Paich – keyboards (tracks 4, 10, additional on 7)
- Phil Perry – additional background vocals (track 4)
- Tyren Perry – background vocals (track 12)
- Greg Phillinganes – keyboards (tracks 2, 4, 10–11), Fender Rhodes (12, 14)
- Steve Porcaro – synth programming (tracks 2, 4, 7, 10)
- Ian Prince – keyboards (tracks 3–4, 9–11), vocoder (6), background vocals (3)
- Bill Reichenbach Jr. – trombone (track 9)
- John Robinson – drums (tracks 12, 14, sampled on 7)
- Derrick Schofield – background vocals (track 7)
- Caiphus Semenya – background vocals (track 2)
- Shane Shoaf – background vocals (track 12)
- Alfie Silas – background vocals (tracks 2, 7)
- Neil Stubenhaus – bass guitar (14)
- Rose Stone – choir director (track 12), background vocals (2, 7)
- Bill Summers – percussion (track 8, African on 2, additional on 7), hindewhu
- Al B. Sure! – lead and background vocals (track 14)
- Brad Sundberg – technical director, audio engineering
- Bruce Swedien – recording engineer (all tracks), mixing (all tracks), kick & snare drums (tracks 4, 14)
- Take 6 – background vocals (tracks 1, 6, 10)
- Rod Temperton – drum machine (tracks 1–2), handclaps (2, 6, 9)
- Ian Underwood – handclaps (tracks 2, 6, 9), synth programming (3–4, 10)
- Luther Vandross – sampled background vocals (track 7)
- Sarah Vaughan – lead vocals (tracks 6, 8–10)
- Mervyn Warren – background vocals (tracks 1, 6, 10), voices (5)
- Dionne Warwick – sampled background vocals (track 7)
- Barry White – lead vocals (track 14)
- Larry Williams – saxophone (track 9), keyboards (9, 13–14, sampled on 7), sampled synthesizer (7), synth programming (3–4, 11, 13–14)
- Syreeta Wright – sampled background vocals (track 4)
- Charity Young – background vocals (track 12)
- Michael C. Young – synth programming (track 9)
- Joe Zawinul – synthesizer solo (tracks 2, 8), sampled synthesizer (9)

== Charts ==
=== Weekly charts ===
Chart (1989–1990)	Peak position
Australian Albums (ARIA)	73
Austrian Albums Chart	19
Dutch Albums Chart	38
German Albums Chart	5
New Zealand Albums Chart	24
Norwegian Albums Chart	16
Swedish Albums Chart	26
Swiss Albums Chart	21
UK Albums Chart	26
US Billboard 200	9
US Top Contemporary Jazz Albums	1
US Top R&B/Hip-Hop Albums (Billboard)	1

== Certifications ==
Region	Certification	Certified units/sales
Canada (Music Canada)	Gold	50,000^{^}
Japan (RIAJ)	Gold	100,000^{^}
United Kingdom (BPI)	Gold	100,000^{^}
United States (RIAA)	Platinum	1,000,000^{^}
^{^} Shipments figures based on certification alone.

== See also ==
- List of number-one R&B albums of 1990 (U.S.)
