= I Heard That!! =

Studio album by Quincy Jones
- Released: 1976
- Recorded: 1969–1976
- Genres: Jazz, disco
- Length: 75:10
- Label: A&M
- Producers: Quincy Jones, Ray Brown, Phil Ramone, Creed Taylor

Quincy Jones chronology
Mellow Madness (1975)	I Heard That!! (1976)	Roots (1977)

Professional ratings
Review scores
Source	Rating
The Rolling Stone Jazz Record Guide	2/5 stars

I Heard That!! is a 1976 double album by Quincy Jones.

The first half of the album consists of new material, with the second a compilation of his work for A&M Records since 1969.

== Track listing ==
1. "I Heard That!!" (Dave Grusin, Quincy Jones)
2. "Things Could Be Worse for Me" (Charles May)
3. "What Good Is a Song" (Jones)
4. "You Have to Do It Yourself" (Jones) (theme from Rebop)
5. "There's a Train Leavin'" (Jones)
6. "Midnight Soul Patrol" (Jones)
7. "Brown Soft Shoe" (Jones)
8. "Superstition" (Stevie Wonder)
9. "Summer in the City" (Steve Boone, John Sebastian, Mark Sebastian)
10. "Is It Love That We're Missing?" (George Johnson, Debbie Smith)
11. "Body Heat" (Bruce Fisher, Jones, Stan Richardson, Leon Ware)
12. "If I Ever Lose This Heaven" (Pam Sawyer, Ware)
13. "Killer Joe" (Benny Golson)
14. "Gula Matari" (Jones)
15. "Theme from the Anderson Tapes" (Jones)
16. "Walking in Space" (Galt MacDermot, James Rado, Gerome Ragni)

== Personnel ==
- Quincy Jones: producer, conductor, arranger, keyboards, synthesizer, trumpet, vocals
- Vocals: Al Jarreau, Barbara Massey, Bill Withers, Bruce Fisher, Carol Willis, Don Elliott, The Five Stairsteps, George Johnson, Hilda Harris, Jesse Kirkland, Jim Gilstrap, Joe Greene, Leon Ware, Louis Johnson, Maeretha Stewart, Marilyn Jackson, Minnie Riperton, Myrna Matthews, Valerie Simpson.
- Keyboards, synthesizer: Paul Beaver, Malcolm Cecil, George Duke, Dave Grusin, Paul Griffin, Herbie Hancock, Bob James, Edd Kalehoff, Eddie Louis, Robert Margouleff, Billy Preston, Bobby Scott, Richard Tee, Michael Boddicker.
- Guitar: Eric Gale, George Johnson, Louis Johnson, David T. Walker, Melvin Ragin, Jean Thielemans.
- Bass: Ray Brown, Ron Carter, Richard Davis, Major Holley.
- Electric bass: Chuck Rainey, Carol Kaye, James Jamerson, Alphonso Johnson, Stanley Clarke, Louis Johnson
- Drums: Billy Cobham (on tracks 6 & 8), Paul Humphrey, Harvey Mason, Grady Tate, James Gadson.
- Percussion: Eddie "Bongo" Brown, George Devens, Don Elliott, Bobbye Hall Porter, Ralph MacDonald, Warren Smith.
- Vibraphone: Milt Jackson.
- Harmonica: Stevie Wonder, Toots Thielemans
- Trumpet: Cat Anderson, Tom Bahler, Bobby Bryant, Buddy Childers, Chuck Findley, John Frosk, Freddie Hubbard, Lloyd Michaels, Danny Moore, Ernie Royal, Joe Newman, Marvin Stamm, Dick Williams, Snooky Young.
- Trombone: J.J. Johnson, Benny Powell, George Jeffers, Frank Rosolino, Alan Ralph, Tony Studd, Kai Winding, Wayne Andre, Garnett Brown, Jimmy Cleveland, Al Grey, Dick Hixon.
- Saxophone: Pepper Adams, Danny Banks, Peter Christlieb, Rahsaan Roland Kirk, Joel Kaye, Jerome Richardson, Hubert Laws, Sahib Shihab, Clifford Solomon, Phil Woods.
- Strings: Seymour Barab, Harry Lookofsky, Kermit Moore, Alan Shulman, Lucien Schmit.
