= Jim Gilstrap =

American singer (1946–2026)

- Born: James Gilstrap; November 10, 1946; Daingerfield, Texas, U.S.
- Died: July 18, 2026 (aged 79)
- Genres: Pop; soul
- Occupations: Singer
- Instruments: Vocals
- Years active: 1967–2026
- Labels: Roxbury Records; Chelsea Records; Bell Records

James Gilstrap (November 10, 1946 – July 18, 2026) was an American singer and session musician. He is best known for his 1975 solo hit single "Swing Your Daddy", as well as singing co-lead to the theme from the television series Good Times.

== Life and career ==
Gilstrap was born in Daingerfield, Texas, on November 10, 1946, to Jodie and Pearlie Mae (Tolbert) Gilstrap. He joined the U.S. Navy Reserve. He began his career in the music industry when he returned from serving in the Vietnam War. Early groups he worked with include the Doodletown Pipers and The Cultures.

In the early 1970s, Gilstrap was one of the backing vocalists in Stevie Wonder's backing outfit, "Wonderlove", appearing on Wonder's albums, Talking Book and Innervisions. Gilstrap sang the opening two lines of the Wonder song, "You Are the Sunshine of My Life" (with Lani Groves singing the next two lines). He subsequently signed a recording contract with Chelsea Records in 1975. His recording of the Kenny Nolan-penned "Swing Your Daddy" was a number 4 hit in the UK Singles Chart in April 1975, and reached number 10 in the US Billboard Black Singles chart. The song peaked at number 64 in Australia and number one in the Netherlands.

He also recorded two albums of his own during the 1970s. The first, titled Swing Your Daddy, contained three more singles in "I'm on Fire" (covering 5000 Volts; it made number 78 in the U.S., and number 19 in Canada for one chart appearance), "House of Strangers", and "Put Out the Fire". The second album, Love Talk (1977), was not as successful.

Gilstrap worked as a session artist for the UK singer Elkie Brooks on her album Live and Learn (1979), among other performances.

He can be heard in a vocal performance on Quincy Jones' 1974 jazz-funk composition "Soul Saga (Song Of The Buffalo Soldier)", from Jones' Body Heat album. Gilstrap also provided the male lead vocals for the theme music to the 1970s television program Good Times. "I've Got You Where I Want You" (1975) was used in the soundtrack of the film Three Days of the Condor. In addition, he sang the theme song for the 1990s cartoon series TaleSpin. He also sang backing vocals on records by Whitney Houston and on the soundtrack of Grease. He did an original song for the Japanese film Survive Style 5+ entitled "A Lament".

Gilstrap worked with the group Side Effect on their track "Run, Run, Run" that was released on Bell Records.

Gilstrap died on July 18, 2026, at the age of 79.

== Discography ==
Solo

- Swing Your Daddy (1975)
- House of Strangers (1975)
- I'm on Fire (1975)
- Love Talk (1976)

as Side Effect member

- Effective (1973)

with Tour De 4force 1

(with Joyce Vincent Wilson, Pam Vincent, Theresa Davis, and Scherrie Payne of The Supremes)

- Quiet Moon (2009)

with Joyce Vincent, Pam Vincent and the Altair All-Star Choir

- "La La Peace Song" (2018)

== Credits ==
Gilstrap's other recording credits include:

Aaron Neville

- Aaron Neville's Soulful Christmas (1993) (Choir Member, Background Vocals)
- The Tattooed Heart (1995) (Background Vocals)
- Believe (2003)
- Christmas & Hits Duos (2008)
- I Know I've Been Changed (2010)

Amaia Montero

- Amaia Montero (2008)
- 2 (2011)

Amy Grant

- A Christmas to Remember (1999) (Choir Member)

Angela Bofill

- Something About You (1981)
- Too Tough (1983)

Anita Baker

- The Songstress (1983)
- Rapture (1986)
- The Best of Anita Baker (2002)
- Sweet Love: The Very Best of Anita Baker (2002)

Aretha Franklin

- Who's Zoomin' Who? (1985)
- Aretha (1986)
- Greatest Hits: 1980–1994 (1994)
- Knew You Were Waiting: The Best of Aretha Franklin 1980–1998 (2012)

Art Garfunkel

- Fate for Breakfast (1979)

Barbra Streisand

- Songbird (1978)
- Higher Ground (1997)

Bill Withers

- Making Music (1975)
- The Essential Bill Withers (2013)

Billy Preston and Syreeta

- Billy Preston & Syreeta (1981)

Boney James

- Boney's Funky Christmas (1996)

Boz Scaggs

- Silk Degrees (1976)
- Down Two Then Left (1977)
- Hits! (1980)
- My Time: The Anthology (1969–1997) (1997)

Brainstorm

- Funky Entertainment (1979)

Sonny Terry & Brownie McGhee

- Sonny & Brownie (1973)

Candi Staton

- Young Hearts Run Free (1976) (Background Vocals)
- House of Love (1978) (Background Vocals)

Carl Anderson

- Absence Without Love/On & On (2009)

Carrie Lucas

- Simply Carrie (1977) (Background Vocals)

Céline Dion

- Let's Talk About Love (1997)
- My Love: Essential Collection (2008)

Crowded House

- Crowded House (1986)

Dana Glover

- Testimony (2002)

Dave Grusin

- 3 Days of the Condor Soundtrack (1975)

Dave Koz

- Lucky Man (1993)
- Off the Beaten Path (1996)

David Foster

- The Christmas Album (1993) (Choir Member)

Dee Dee Bridgewater

- Dee Dee Bridgewater (1976)
- Bad for Me (1979)
- Only the Best of Dee Dee Bridgewater (2009)

Diana DeGarmo

- Blue Skies (2004)

Dianne Reeves

- Never Too Far (1989)

Dionne Warwick

- Aquarela do Brasil (1994) (Additional Vocals on "Flower of Bahia")

Disney

- The Disney Afternoon Songbook: Music from Hit TV Shows (1990)
- The Music of Disney: A Legacy in Song (1992)
- Disney's Music from the Park (1996)
- Disney's Rock-A-Bye Baby: Soft Hits for Little Rockers (1996)
- Matrix Revolutions [Original Motion Picture Soundtrack] (2003)

Donald Byrd

- Thank You...For F.U.M.L. (Funking Up My Life) (1978)

Donald Byrd and 125th St. NYC

- Donald Byrd and 125th Street, N.Y.C. (1979)

Dr. John

- Tango Palace (1979)

Elkie Brooks

- Rich Man's Woman (1975)
- Live & Learn (1979)

Elton John

- The Fox (1981)
- Duets (1993)

England Dan & John Ford Coley

- Dr. Heckle & Mr. Jive (1978)
- The Very Best of England Dan & John Ford Coley (1996)

Erich Kunzel

- The Magical Music of Disney (1995)

Eros Ramazzotti

- Tutte storie (1993)
- Dove c'è musica (1996)
- Eros (1997)
- Calma apparente (2005)
- Ali e radici (2009)

Everlast

- Eat at Whitey's (2000)
- Love, War and the Ghost of Whitey Ford (2008)

Funk

- Priced to Sell (1974)

Gene Page

- Lovelock! (1976)
- Close Encounters (1978)

George Benson

- Give Me the Night (1980)
- While the City Sleeps (1986)
- The Greatest Hits of All (2003)
- The Very Best of George Benson: The Greatest Hits of All (2004)

George Duke

- Snapshot (1992)
- Illusions (1995) (Additional Vocals on "The Simple Things", Background Vocals)
- Best of George Duke: The Elektra Years (1997)
- Is Love Enough? (1997)
- Cool (2000)
- Face the Music (2002)
- Duke (2005)
- Ultimate George Duke (2007)
- Dukey Treats (2008)
- Dreamweaver (2013)
- George Duke Collection (2014)

Gladys Knight

- Miss Gladys Knight (1978) (Background Vocals as a member of the Jim Gilstrap Singers)
- Good Woman (1991) (Background Vocals on "Where Would I Be")

Hanne Boel

- Misty Paradise (2001)

Harold Faltermeyer

- Copout (2010)

Harry Styles

- Harry Styles (2017)

Harvey Mason

- Marching in the Street (1976)
- Groovin' You (1979)
- Sho Nuff Groovin' You: The Arista Records Anthology 1975–1981 (2017)

Henry Mancini

- "Easy Baby" (from the film 99 and 44/100% Dead)

Herbie Hancock

- Lite Me Up (1982)

Hiroshima

- Hiroshima (1979) (Background Vocals)
- Odori (1980) (Background Vocals)
- Third Generation (1983) (Can Do Choir Member, Additional Background Vocals)
- Another Place (1985)
- Go (1987) (Background Vocals)
- Ongaku (1988)
- East (1989) (Additional Lead & Background Vocals)
- Providence (1992)
- L. A. (1994) (Background Vocals)

Irene Cara

- Carasmatic (1987)

Jackson Browne

- Looking East (1996)

James Ingram

- It's Your Night (1983)
- It's Real (1989)

James Newton Howard

- King Kong: Original Motion Picture Soundtrack (2005)

James Taylor

- Dad Loves His Work (1981)

Jean Carn

- Sweet and Wonderful (1981)

Joe Cocker

- Hymn for My Soul (2007)

Joe Sample

- Roles (1987)
- Sample This (1997)
- The Best of Joe Sample (1998)
- Introducing Joe Sample (2006)
- Rhino Hi-Five: Joe Sample

Joey Lawrence

- Joey Lawrence (1993)

John Hiatt

- Little Head (1997)

John Powell

- Ice Age: The Meltdown [Original Motion Picture Soundtrack] (2006)

Johnny Gill

- Chemistry (1985)

Johnny Gill and Stacy Lattisaw

- Perfect Combination (1984)

Johnny Mathis

- Mathis on Broadway (2000)

Johnny Mathis and Deniece Williams

- That's What Friends Are For (1978)

José Feliciano

- Just Wanna Rock 'n' Roll (1975)

June Pointer

- Baby Sister (1983)

Kanye West

- 808s & Heartbreak (2008)

Keith Moon

- Two Sides of the Moon (1975)

Kelis

- Kelis Was Here (2006)

Kenny G

- Breathless (1992)

Kenny Loggins

- Back to Avalon (1988)
- The Unimaginable Life (1997)

Leo Sayer

- Leo Sayer (1978)

Leonard Cohen

- Recent Songs (1979)

Linda Lewis

- Woman Overboard (1977)

Linda Ronstadt

- Hasten Down the Wind (1976)
- Simple Dreams (1977)
- Living in the USA (1978)
- Greatest Hits, Volume Two (1980)
- The Linda Ronstadt Box Set (1999)
- 3 for One (2000)

Lionel Richie

- Back to Front (1992)

Livingston Taylor

- Three Way Mirror (1978)

Luther Vandross

- Songs (1994)
- The Ultimate Luther Vandross [2001] (2001)
- The Essential Luther Vandross (2003)
- Love, Luther (2007)
- The Music of Luther Vandross (2009)
- The Box Set Series (2014)

Lynn Ahrens / Stephen Flaherty / David Newman

- Anastasia: Music From the Motion Picture (1997)

Martha Davis

- Policy (1987)

Martha Reeves

- Martha Reeves (1974)

Masayoshi Takanaka

- An Insatiable High (1977)

Melissa Manchester

- If My Heart Had Wings (1995)

Michael Bolton

- The One Thing (1993)
- All That Matters (1997)
- Hits 1985–1995: Best of the Best Gold (2003)
- Michael Bolton [Collector's Tin] (2009)

Michael Jackson

- Off the Wall (1979)
- HIStory: Past, Present and Future, Book I (1995)
- The Ultimate Collection (2004)
- The Essential Michael Jackson (2005)

Milira

- Back Again!!! (1992)

Minnie Riperton

- Stay in Love (1977)

Nancy Wilson

- Come Get to This (1975)
- This Mother's Daughter (1976)
- Forbidden Lover (1987)
- A Lady with a Song (1990)

Narada Michael Walden

- Awakening (1979)
- The Dance of Life (1979)
- Victory (1980)
- Confidence (1982)
- Looking at You, Looking at Me (1983)
- The Nature of Things (1985)
- Divine Emotion (1988)
- Ecstasy's Dance: The Best of Narada Michael Walden (1996)

Neil Diamond

- The Greatest Hits: 1966-1992 (1992)

Neil Young

- Living with War (2006)

Norman Connors

- Take It to the Limit (1980)

Olivia Newton-John

- Totally Hot (1978)

Patrice Rushen

- Patrice 1978)
- Pizzazz (1979)
- Posh (1980)
- Now (1984)
- Anything but Ordinary (1994)
- Haven't You Heard – The Best of Patrice Rushen (1996)

Patrick Doyle

- Rise of the Planet of the Apes Soundtrack (2011)

Patti Austin

- Patti Austin (1984)

Patti LaBelle

- Winner in You (1986)
- Be Yourself (1989)

Paul Williams

- A Little Bit of Love (1974)
- The Best of Paul Williams (2008)

Paul Young

- The Crossing (1993)

Peabo Bryson

- Positive (1988)
- Through the Fire (1994)

Peabo Bryson and Roberta Flack

- Born to Love (1983)

Peggy Lee

- Let's Love (1974)

Phyllis Hyman

- Phyllis Hyman (1977)
- Goddess of Love (1983)

Priscilla Ahn

- A Good Day (2008)

Quincy Jones

- Body Heat (1974)
- Mellow Madness (1975)
- I Heard That!! (1976)
- Roots: The Saga of an American Family (1977)
- The Dude (1981)
- From Q, With Love (1999)
- Q: The Musical Biography of Quincy Jones (2001)

Rachelle Ferrell

- Rachelle Ferrell (1992)

Ray Charles

- Genius Loves Company (2004) (Background Vocals on "Heaven Help Us All")

Ricky Martin

- Vuelve (1998)

Ringo Starr

- Goodnight Vienna (1974)
- Ringo the 4th (1977)

Roberta Flack

- Blue Lights in the Basement (1977)

Roy Ayers

- Fever (1979)

Russ Freeman and The Rippingtons

- Sahara (1994)

Russell Hitchcock

- Russell Hitchcock (1988)

Santana

- Spirits Dancing in the Flesh (1990)

Sarah Vaughan

- Songs of the Beatles (1981)

Scherrie and Susaye

- Partners (1979)

Seals & Crofts

- Takin' It Easy (1978)

Siedah Garrett

- Kiss of Life (1988)

Stacy Lattisaw

- Let Me Be Your Angel (1980)
- With You (1981)
- Sneakin' Out (1982)
- Sixteen (1983)
- The Very Best of Stacy Lattisaw (1998)

Stanley Clarke

- Time Exposure (1984)
- Guitar & Bass (2004)

Stanley Clarke and George Duke

- 3 (1990)

Stanley Turrentine

- Have You Ever Seen the Rain (1975)
- In the Pocket (1975)
- Betcha (1980)
- On a Misty Night (2002)

Starship

- No Protection (1987)

Stevie Wonder

- Talking Book (1972)
- Innervisions (1973)
- Fulfillingness' First Finale (1974)
- The Definitive Collection (2002)

Syreeta

- Syreeta (1972)
- One to One 1977)
- Set My Love in Motion (1981)

Teddy Pendergrass

- Truly Blessed (1991)

The Blackbyrds

- Unfinished Business (1976)
- Action (1977)
- Night Grooves: The Blackbyrds' Greatest Hits (1978)
- Better Days (1980)

The Brothers Johnson

- Look Out for #1 (1976)
- Right on Time (1977)
- Light Up the Night (1980)

The Jacksons

- Triumph (1980)
- The Jacksons: An American Dream (1992)
- The Best Remixes (1998)
- Original Album Classics (2008)

The Party

- The Party (1990) (Additional Background Vocals on "Storm Me")

The Rippingtons

- The Best of The Rippingtons (1997)

The Simpsons

- Testify (2007) (Studio Singer, Character Voice)

Thelma Houston

- I've Got the Music in Me (1975)

Tower of Power

- Direct (1981)

Whitney Houston

- Whitney (1987)

Willy DeVille

- Backstreets of Desire (1992)
- Loup Garou (1995)

Willy DeVille & The Mink DeVille Band

- Big Easy Fantasy (1995)

== See also ==
- List of performers on Top of the Pops
