= Out of Control (The Brothers Johnson album) =

Studio album by the Brothers Johnson
- Released: 1984
- Genres: R&B; funk
- Length: 43:10
- Label: A&M
- Producers: The Brothers Johnson, Leon Sylvers III, and David "Hawk" Wolinski

The Brothers Johnson chronology
Winners (1981)	Out of Control (1984)	Kickin' (1988)

Singles from Out of Control
- 1. "You Keep Me Coming Back" Released: 1984; 2. "Lovers Forver" Released: 1984

Out of Control is the fifth album by American funk duo The Brothers Johnson, released in 1984. It was their second album without the production of Quincy Jones, with production on the album by Leon Sylvers III, David "Hawk" Wolinski, and the brothers themselves.

== Background ==
Following the release of their 1980 album Light Up the Night, the Brothers Johnson entered a period of separate projects. Bassist Louis Johnson contributed bass to Michael Jackson's Thriller and released a gospel album, while guitarist and vocalist George Johnson worked with Steve Arrington. The brothers also released the single "The Real Thing" in 1981 and "Welcome to the Club" in 1982, but did not release another album together for more than three years.

The brothers reunited in the recording studio in 1984 to record Out of Control, their seventh album for A&M Records and their first album of entirely new material in more than three years. Cash Box described the album as a departure from the pop-oriented style associated with their longtime mentor and producer Quincy Jones, instead featuring producers including Leon Sylvers III, Keg Johnson Jr., David "Hawk" Wolinski, and the brothers themselves. George Johnson said that Sylvers' production emphasized the "rawness and gut feeling of the street" in the album's rhythm tracks.

The album was preceded by the single "You Keep Me Coming Back", which became an R&B hit. Contemporary Billboard described the resulting album as one of the duo's "most stylish grooves ever" and praised its sleek, dance-oriented production.

== Reception ==
Professional ratings
Review scores
Source	Rating
Billboard	Favorable
Music Week	2/5 stars
AllMusic	3/5 stars

Out of Control received generally positive reviews from contemporary critics. Billboard praised the album's production, describing it as a "sleek, danceable package of soul-to-go" and highlighting "You Keep Me Coming Back", "Tokyo", and "Lovers Forever". Music Week similarly described the album as evidence of the Brothers Johnson's funk credentials, calling it "two sides of uncompromising transatlantic club sound", while noting that it was likely to appeal primarily to committed listeners.

Retrospectively, AllMusic critic Amy Hanson praised the album's grooves and the interplay between its bass and vocals, but found that its ballads and soft soul material outweighed its funk-oriented tracks. Hanson concluded that Out of Control would likely disappoint fans of the group's earlier funk work, although she considered it to contain several worthwhile moments and credited the duo with demonstrating their staying power.

== Track listing ==
Out of Control track listing
No.	Title	Length
1.	"You Keep Me Coming Back"	5:15
2.	"Lovers Forever"	4:48
3.	"Do You"	3:27
4.	"Let's Try Love Again"	3:36
5.	"I Came Here to Party"	4:16
6.	"Out of Control"	4:23
7.	"Save Me"	4:12
8.	"Tokyo"	4:44
9.	"Dazed"	4:28
10.	"It's All Over Now"	4:01
Total length:		43:10

== Personnel ==
Credits adapted from AllMusic.

=== The Brothers Johnson ===
- George Johnson – vocals, guitar, producer, mixing
- Louis Johnson – vocals, bass, guitar, producer

=== Additional personnel ===
- Leon Sylvers III – producer, mixing
- David "Hawk" Wolinski – producer, mixing
- Keg Johnson - producer, mixing
- Jack Joseph Puig – engineering, mixing
- Les D. Cooper – engineering, mixing
- John Arrias – engineering, mixing
- Steve Hodge – engineering
- Bernie Grundman – mastering
- Ivy Skoff – production coordination
