= Welcome to the Club =

Welcome to the Club may refer to:

- Welcome to the Club (musical), a 1989 Broadway musical with music and lyrics by Cy Coleman
- Welcome to the Club (1971 film), an American comedy film
- Welcome to the Club (2022 film), an American animated short film based on The Simpsons, released on Disney+
- Welcome to the Club (Ian Hunter album)
- Welcome to the Club (Nat King Cole album), or the title track
- Welcome to the Club (Kick Axe album)
- Welcome to the Club, an album by DJ Manian
- Welcome to the Club (Manian song), 2009
- "Welcome to the Club" (The Brothers Johnson song), 1982
- "Welcome to the Club", a 1992 song by Tim McGraw on his self-titled debut album
- "Welcome to the Club", a song by Vandenberg from their album Heading for a Storm, 1983
- "Welcome to the Club", a song by Joe Walsh on his album, So What
- "Welcome to the Club" (Fear the Walking Dead), an episode of the television series Fear the Walking Dead
