= Get the Funk Out Ma Face =

"Get The Funk Out Ma Face"

Single by the Brothers Johnson

from the album Look Out for#1
- B-side: "Tomorrow"
- Released: 1976
- Genre: soul, funk, R&B
- Length: 6:01
- Label: A&M
- Songwriters: Louis Johnson, George Johnson, Quincy Jones
- Producer: Quincy Jones

The Brothers Johnson singles chronology
"I'll Be Good to You" (1976)	"Get The Funk Out Ma Face" (1976)	"Free and Single" (1976)

"Get The Funk Out Ma Face" is a song released by the Brothers Johnson from their debut album, Look Out for#1, released in 1976 as a single on A&M Records. The single peaked at No. 4 on the US Billboard Hot Soul Songs chart, No. 15 on the US Billboard Dance Club Songs chart and No. 30 on the US Billboard Hot 100.

== Critical reception ==
Craig Lytle of Allmusic called Get The Funk Out Ma Face a "bona fide funk jam".
