= Stomp! (Brothers Johnson song) =

1980 single by the Brothers Johnson

Single by the Brothers Johnson

from the album Light Up the Night
- B-side: "Let's Swing"
- Released: February 6, 1980
- Recorded: 1978–1979
- Genre: Disco
- Length: 6:20 (album version); 4:08 (single and video edit)
- Label: A&M
- Songwriters: Louis Johnson; George "Happy" Johnson; Valerie Johnson; Rod Temperton
- Producer: Quincy Jones

The Brothers Johnson singles chronology
"Ain't We Funkin' Now" (1979)	"Stomp!" (1980)	"Light Up the Night" (1980)

"Stomp!" is a song released by the Brothers Johnson from their fourth album, Light Up the Night, in early 1980. It reached number one on the Dance singles chart. In the US it reached number one on the R&B singles chart and peaked at number 7 on the Billboard Hot 100 in early 1980. In the UK it entered the singles chart at number 65 on February 23, 1980, and climbed to its highest position, number 6, by March 30, 1980. It spent a total of 12 weeks on the UK Singles Chart. The song also reached number one on the New Zealand Singles Chart, staying in this position for six weeks in 1980.

== Personnel ==
- George Johnson – rhythm and lead guitar, lead and backing vocals
- Louis Johnson – bass guitar, synthesizer, lead and backing vocals
- Greg Phillinganes – electric piano, synthesizer
- Steve Porcaro – synthesizer
- Rod Temperton – electric piano
- Paulinho da Costa – percussion
- John Robinson – drums
- Jerry Hey – trumpet
- Gary Grant – trumpet
- Kim Hutchcroft – saxophone (baritone, soprano, tenor)
- Larry Williams – saxophone (alto, tenor), synthesizer
- Bill Reichenbach Jr. – Euphonium, conducting, trombone, slide trumpet
- Augie Johnson, Jim Gilstrap, Josie James, Merry Clayton, Michael Jackson, Scherrie Payne, Susaye Greene-Brown, Valerie Johnson, Quincy Jones – backing vocals

== Chart history ==
=== Weekly charts ===
Chart (1980)	Peak position
Australia (Kent Music Report)	13
Belgium (Ultratop 50 Flanders)	9
Canada Top Singles (RPM)	49
France (IFOP)	6
Germany (GfK)	24
Ireland (IRMA)	14
Netherlands (Single Top 100)	11
New Zealand (Recorded Music NZ)	1
Norway (VG-lista)	4
Sweden (Sverigetopplistan)	13
UK Singles (Official Charts)	6
US Billboard Hot 100	7
US Billboard R&B	1
US Billboard Dance Club Songs	1
US Cash Box Top 100	8

=== Year-end charts ===
Chart (1980)	Rank
Australia (Kent Music Report)	92
New Zealand	2
UK	85
US Top Pop Singles (Billboard)	46
US Billboard R&B	15
US Cash Box	66

== Certifications ==
Region	Certification	Certified units/sales
New Zealand (RMNZ)	Gold	10,000^{*}
^{*} Sales figures based on certification alone.

== US and UK released versions ==
- 12-inch US promo (SP-17111) – 6:22
- 7-inch US edit (2216-S) – 3:58
- 7-inch US edit (K7857) – 4:05
- 12-inch UK (AMSP-7509-A) – 6:23
- 7-inch UK (AMS 7509) – 6:23

== Other notable versions ==
In 1996, B.G., the Prince of Rap, released his cover version of "Stomp!" The dance-oriented song hit number 2 in Canada, number 53 in Germany, number 15 in Finland and number 22 in New Zealand.

== See also ==
- List of number-one singles from the 1980s (New Zealand)
- List of number-one dance singles of 1980 (U.S.)
- List of number-one R&B singles of 1980 (U.S.)
- List of post-disco artists and songs
