= Carasmatic =

Studio album by Irene Cara
- Released: 1987
- Studios: Ocean Way Recording, Sunset Sound and Soundcastle (Hollywood, California); LeGonks West (West Hollywood, California); Westlake Studios, Cherokee Studios, Lion Share Studios, The Village Recorder and Record Plant (Los Angeles, California); Gate Way (Santa Barbara, California); Altadena Sound (Altadena, California); Moonee Ponds Studios (Malibu, California); Metropolis (Studio City, California); Nimbus 9, Mediasound Studios and CBS Songs (New York City, New York)
- Genres: Pop rock, soft rock
- Length: 39:56
- Label: Elektra
- Producers: Irene Cara; George Duke; George Johnson; John Farrar; Bill Seidman

Irene Cara chronology
What a Feelin' (1983)	Carasmatic (1987)	Irene Cara Presents Hot Caramel (2011)

Singles from Carasmatic
- 1. "Girlfriends"/"Dying for Your Love" Released: February 1987; 2. "Give Me Love" Released: March 1987

Carasmatic is Irene Cara's third and final studio album (and fourth album overall when counting Esta es Irene in 1967) released in 1987. It was her only album for Elektra Records. The album was mostly produced by George Duke. Many popular musicians also contributed to this album such as Luther Vandross, Lynn Davis, James Ingram, Patrice Rushen, Kenny Loggins, Bonnie Raitt, Carole King, John Farrar and Michael Bolton.

The album was not as successful as What a Feelin', and did not chart on the Billboard 200, as the lead single "Girlfriends" failed to chart in the Hot 100 and received mixed reviews.

It was her final album before she died in 2022.

== Critical reviews ==
Professional ratings
Review scores
Source	Rating
AllMusic	3.5/5 stars

Billboard called the album a "mixed bag of top 40 fare with mixed results, despite presence of all-star supporters, including Brothers Johnson, Luther Vandross, and Bonnie Raitt." However they singled out the track "Don't Wanna Let Go" as Cara's "best shot."

AllMusic noted that "the material here lacks the vocal and musical conviction of her first two albums...with only halfway decent songs, limited production, and Cara vocally not up to par, this album will only be of interest to the true Cara conoisseur."

However, Cash Box was more complimentary in their review, noting that "Cara checks in with a sizzling collection of grooving tunes. She uses an all-star cast of producers and players to give the record its sparkling shine."

== Track listing ==
1. "Get a Grip" (Debbie Johnson, George Johnson, Cara) – 4:58
2. "Give Me Love" (Michael Bolton, Patrick Henderson) – 3:58
3. "We're Gonna Get Up" (Danny Sembello, David Batteau) – 4:42
4. "Now That It's Over" (Doug James, Bolton) – 4:20
5. "Say Goodnight Irene" (Cara, John Farrar) – 4:38
6. "Don't Wanna Let Go" (James, Bolton) – 3:32
7. "Girlfriends" (Gordon Grody, Cara) – 4:14
8. "Be Your Number One" (Gerald Tillman, Harold Allen Jr., Yolanda "Yo-Yo" Smith) – 5:31
9. "Falling in Love" (Bill Seidman) – 4:03

== Personnel ==
- Irene Cara – lead vocals (1–8), backing vocals (1, 5, 8), acoustic piano (1), additional backing vocals (2), additional backing vocal solo (3), Synclavier (5, 7), Yamaha DX7 solo (5), vocals (9)
- George Johnson – keyboards (1), guitars (1, 8), guitar solo (1), bass (1), synth bass (1), additional backing vocal solo (3)
- Steve Robbins – Oberheim OB-Xa (1, 9), Roland Juno-106 (1), Roland JX-8P (1), Yamaha DX7 (1), Yamaha CX5M (1), synth solo (1), Synclavier piano (7), synthesizers (7), OB-Xa solo (7), Fender Rhodes (9), Minimoog (9)
- George Duke – acoustic piano (2), Prophet-5 (2, 4, 6), Synclavier (2, 6, 7), Memorymoog bass (2, 6), Linn 9000 programming (2), Memorymoog (4), Yamaha TX816 (4), Yamaha DX7 (6), LinnDrum (6), horns (7), strings (7), percussion (7)
- Danny Sembello – Yamaha DX7 (3), Roland JX-8P bass (3), Linn 9000 programming (3)
- Randy Kerber – acoustic piano (4), Yamaha DX7 (4)
- John Farrar – Synclavier (5), Yamaha TX816 horns (5), vocoder (5), guitars (5), backing vocals (5) backing vocal solo (5)
- Marcus Ryle – Oberheim Matrix-12 (5), Kurzweil K250 (5), Synclavier (5)
- Patrice Rushen – keyboards (8), synth bass (8)
- Frank Owens – acoustic piano (9)
- Paul Jackson, Jr. – guitars (2, 4, 6, 7)
- Freddie Washington – bass (4)
- Louis Johnson – bass (8)
- Harvey Mason – drums (1), Simmons tom fills (1)
- John Robinson – drums (2), Simmons tom fills (3, 6)
- Jim Keltner – drums (5)
- Harold Allen – drum sequencing (8)
- Paulinho da Costa – percussion (3)
- Charlotte Crossley – backing vocals (1, 6, 7), additional backing vocals (8)
- Jo Ann Harris – backing vocals (1)
- David Lasley – backing vocals (1, 6)
- Paulette McWilliams – backing vocals (1)
- Luther Vandross – backing vocals (1)
- Terry Bradford – backing vocals (2, 3)
- Daryl Carpenter – additional backing vocals (2), backing vocal solo (8)
- Patrick Henderson – backing vocals (2, 3)
- Jacquelyn Gouche – backing vocals (2, 3)
- Joel Osborne – additional backing vocals (2)
- Sybil Thomas – additional backing vocals (2)
- Fred White – backing vocals (2, 3)
- Elisecia Wright – backing vocals (2, 3)
- Lynn Davis – backing vocals (6)
- Joyce Kennedy – backing vocals (7), group vocals (8)
- Carole King – backing vocals (7)
- Bonnie Raitt – backing vocals (7)
- Wanda Vaughn – backing vocals (7)
- Syreeta Wright – backing vocals (7)
- Pat McKenna – additional backing vocals (8)
- Yolanda Smith – additional backing vocals (8)
- Jim Gilstrap – group vocals (8)
- James Ingram – group vocals (8)

Music arrangements

- David Diggs – horn arrangements (1, 2)
- George Johnson – arrangements (1, 8)
- Luther Vandross – BGV arrangements (1)
- George Duke – arrangements (2–4, 6)
- George Del Barrio – orchestra and string arrangements (4)
- Irene Cara – arrangements (7), BGV arrangements (8)
- Gordon Grody – co-arrangements (7)
- Bill Seidman – arrangements (9)

=== Production ===
- Irene Cara – executive producer, co-producer (1, 9)
- George Johnson – producer (1, 8)
- George Duke – producer (2–4, 6, 7)
- John Farrar – producer (5)
- Bill Seidman – producer (9)
- Alice Murrell – production assistant (2–4, 6, 7)
- Bob Defrin – art direction
- Antonio Lopez – cover artwork
- Jeff Tomberg – management

Technical credits

- Brian Gardner – LP mastering at Bernie Grundman Mastering (Hollywood, California)
- Stephen Innocenzi – CD mastering at Atlantic Studios (New York City, New York)
- John Pace – recording (1)
- Michael Barbiero – mixing (1, 6–8), mix engineer (1, 6–8), mix supervision (8)
- Steve Thompson – mixing (1, 6–8), mix supervision (8)
- Erik Zobler – recording (2–4, 6)
- Tommy Vicari – mix engineer (2), string recording (4), recording (7)
- Michael H. Brauer – mixing (3, 4, 9)
- Allen Sides – recording (5), mix engineer (5)
- Tim Wilson – recording (5)
- George Johnson – recording (8)
- Paul McKenna – recording (8)
- Dave Easton – assistant engineer (1)
- Mitch Gibson – assistant engineer (3, 4, 6)
