= Blam! (album) =

Studio album by the Brothers Johnson
- Released: 1978
- Recorded: 1978
- Studios: Cherokee, Los Angeles; Westlake Audio, Los Angeles; A & R, New York City
- Genre: Funk
- Length: 31:33
- Label: A&M
- Producer: Quincy Jones

The Brothers Johnson chronology
Right on Time (1977)	Blam! (1978)	Light Up the Night (1980)

Singles from Be Yourself Tonight
- 1. "Ride-O-Rocket" Released: 1978; 2. "Ain't We Funkin' Now" Released: 1978

Blam! is the third album by the Los Angeles-based duo the Brothers Johnson. Released in 1978, the album topped the Billboard R&B albums chart and reached number seven on the Billboard 200 pop albums chart. It was certified Platinum in the US by the RIAA.

== Critical reception ==
Professional ratings
Review scores
Source	Rating
AllMusic	4/5 stars
Record Mirror	5/5 stars

Alex Henderson of AllMusic wrote that the album "demonstrates that funk can be sleek and gritty at the same time... Blam! is excellent from start to finish."

== Track listing ==
1. "Ain't We Funkin' Now" - (Alex Weir, Louis Johnson, Quincy Jones, Tom Bahler, Valerie Johnson) 5:36
2. "So Won't You Stay" - (David Foster, Harvey Mason) 3:20
3. "Blam!" - (Weir, Foster, George Johnson, L. Johnson, Jones, Bahler) 4:55
4. "Rocket Countdown / Blastoff" - (William Reichenbach, Jerry Hey) 0:51
5. "Ride-O-Rocket" - (Nickolas Ashford, Valerie Simpson) 4:43
6. "Mista' Cool" - (Ed Eckstine, Larry Williams, L. Johnson) 3:27
7. "It's You Girl" - (G. Johnson, L. Johnson, Jones) 3:32
8. "Streetwave" - (Weir, Jerry Hey, L. Johnson, Wayne Vaughn) 5:05

== Personnel ==
- George Johnson – lead guitar, lead and backing vocals
- Louis Johnson – bass guitar, guitar, piano, synthesizer, lead and backing vocals
- Alex Weir – rhythm guitar, backing vocals, lead vocals on "It's You Girl"
- David Foster – synthesizer, electric piano
- Larry Carlton – guitar
- Steve Khan – guitar
- Harvey Mason – drums
- Steve Schaeffer – drums
- Wayne Vaughn – electric piano, backing vocals
- Richard Tee – electric piano, acoustic piano
- Eddie "Bongo" Brown – percussion
- Steve Porcaro – synthesizer
- Lawrence Williams – synthesizer, saxophone, flute, alto flute, clarinet
- Kim Hutchcroft – alto saxophone, soprano saxophone, baritone saxophone, tenor saxophone, alto flute
- Jerry Hey – trumpet, flugelhorn, piccolo trumpet, French horn
- Gary Grant – trumpet, flugelhorn, slide trumpet, piccolo trumpet
- William Reichenbach – bass alto trombone
- Michael Brecker – tenor saxophone
- Steve Foreman – timpani
- Babi Floyd – backing vocals
- Bobby Rodriquez – backing vocals
- Frank Floyd – backing vocals
- Gwen Guthrie – backing vocals
- Kenny Pickens – backing vocals
- Patti Austin – backing vocals
- Raymond Simpson – backing vocals
- Richard Heath – backing vocals
- Tom Bahler – backing vocals
- Yollanda McCullough – backing vocals
- Vivian Cherry – backing vocals
- William Eaton – backing vocals
- Zachary Sanders – backing vocals

== Charts and certifications ==
=== Weekly charts ===
Chart (1978)	Peak position
US Billboard 200	7
US Top R&B/Hip-Hop Albums (Billboard)	1

=== Year-end charts ===
Chart (1978)	Position
US Top R&B/Hip-Hop Albums (Billboard)	4

=== Singles ===
Year	Single	Chart positions	
Year	Single	US	US R&B
1978	"Ride-O-Rocket"	104	45
1978	"Ain't We Funkin' Now"	102	45

=== Certifications ===
Region	Certification	Certified units/sales
United States (RIAA)	Platinum	1,000,000^{^}
^{^} Shipments figures based on certification alone.
