= I'll Be Good =

I'll Be Good may refer to:

- I'll Be Good to You by the Brothers Johnson
- A single by Jaymes Young
- A single by René & Angela
