= One Wish =

One Wish may refer to:

- One Wish (film), a 2010 American drama directed by Felix Limardo
- One Wish (Deborah Cox album), 1998
- One Wish: The Holiday Album, 2003, by Whitney Houston
- "One Wish" (Hiroshima song), 1986, from the album Another Place
- "One Wish" (Ray J song), 2005, from the album Raydiation
- "One Wish" (Roxette song), 2006, from the album A Collection of Roxette Hits: Their 20 Greatest Songs!
- "One Wish (for Christmas)", 1994 by Freddie Jackson, from his album Freddie Jackson at Christmas
- "1 Wish", a 2024 song by Ava Max
