= Paulette McWilliams =

American singer and songwriter

Paulette McWilliams is an American singer and songwriter. She began her career singing with the bands The American Breed and Rufus, and has appeared as a backing vocalist on recordings and on tour for numerous artists. She worked with Marvin Gaye, Luther Vandross, Aretha Franklin, The Jacksons, Michael Jackson, Quincy Jones and as a member of Bette Midler's backing group the Harlettes, among many others.

== Early life ==
Paulette McWilliams grew up on Chicago's South Side. From an early age, perhaps as young as three or four, she had decided on a career as a singer. Along with two older sisters, from whom she developed an appreciation of live music, she attended shows at various clubs and outdoor block parties from an early age.

She was frequently asked to perform for family and friends and had her first public exposure at age 11 when she appeared on the television show Little Stars, in which she performed alongside Sammy Davis Jr. and sang "Catch a Falling Star". Her early musical influences include Sarah Vaughan, Aretha Franklin, Ella Fitzgerald, Nina Simone, Dinah Washington, Peggy Lee, and Curtis Mayfield, among others.

== Career ==
At 12 years old, she got her first agent and began to sing professionally, signing with Don Talty, who managed soul singer Jan Bradley. Her first recording, a song she wrote herself originally titled "He’s Nothing but a Teenage Dropout", came out as the B-side on a Jan Bradley single. It was later released under the title "Teenage Dropout" for her own singing group, Paulette and the Cupids. She continued to work sporadically through high school, first attending Loretto Academy and, for her senior year, Harlan High School. Two years after graduating, she gave birth to her only child, a daughter.

McWilliams joined the Chicago-based rock band The American Breed in 1969 as the band's sound shifted from psychedelic rock towards a more soul and R&B sound. Over the next several years, the band personnel shifted and names changed several times, finally settling on the name Ask Rufus in 1970. McWilliams served as the primary female lead vocalist for the first two years of the band's existence, but voluntarily left the group in 1972, as she was exhausted from touring and wished to spend more time with her family. McWilliams recommended her own replacement, her close friend Chaka Khan, who herself would go on to lead the band through their most successful period.

After leaving Rufus, McWilliams moved to Los Angeles, where she found steady work in advertising, singing jingles for over 600 radio and television spots. Guitarist Phil Upchurch recommended her to producer Quincy Jones, who used her extensively on his Body Heat promotional tour, singing backing and lead vocals. Upon returning from the tour, she performed on Jones's next album Mellow Madness, though Jones became busy with his production of The Wiz, allowing McWilliams to seek other singing work. She landed with Ralph MacDonald as a songwriter and singer and performed backing vocals on works by Patti Austin among others.

In 1977, she recorded and released her first solo album, Feel Good All Over, released by Fantasy Records, though she was disappointed with her performance, and the album failed to become a hit. In the late 1970s, she became a duet partner with Johnny Mathis, performing with him for several years and appearing on his 1980 album Different Kinda Different. Over the same time period, she continued to work with Quincy Jones, appearing on the Michael Jackson album Off the Wall and its hit single "Don't Stop 'Til You Get Enough". After working with Mathis, she auditioned for an open spot in Bette Midler's backing group the Harlettes, which she got, and ended up touring in support of her stage show The Divine Miss M, including an eight-week run on Broadway. Through Midler, she became introduced to Luther Vandross, whom she would work with from 1982 until 2002, singing on every album he recorded during this period.

Throughout the 1980s, she continued to perform backing vocals for artists from many genres, singing on David Bowie's "Cat People (Putting Out Fire)", on Billy Idol's cover of "Mony Mony" and "Hot in the City", singing and touring with Aretha Franklin on her Jump to It album and on the supporting tour, and on tour with Marvin Gaye following his release of Midnight Love and the hit single "Sexual Healing", singing all of the Tammi Terrell duets with Marvin. She moved to New York in 1986, by which time she was working extensively with Luther Vandross, who was now a major star, including on his album Power of Love. She toured with Vandross on all of his tours from 1984 to 2000. During this time, Luther included Paulette on many background vocal sessions that he worked on as a producer, for artists including Irene Cara, Brecker Brothers, Diana Ross, Patti LaBelle, and Whitney Houston. Since 2000, she has recorded and toured with Mary J. Blige, Celine Dion, Michael Buble, Jennifer Lopez, and Steely Dan, as part of their cadre of backing singers known as "The Danettes". Actor Jason Isaacs and producer Caitrin Rogers sought her input in recruiting fellow backing singers for the documentary 20 Feet from Stardom; McWilliams was on tour in Russia at the time of filming and was disappointed that she could not appear in the film herself, and thought the film misrepresented backing singers as dissatisfied with their roles.

McWilliams' latest solo album These Are The Sweet Things was released in 2023.

== Personal life ==
McWilliams has a daughter, Brigette, a former singer and interior designer.

== Discography ==
- Never Been Here Before (1977)
- Flow (2007)
- Telling Stories (with Tom Scott) (2012)
- A Woman's Story (2020)
- These Are The Sweet Things (2023)
