= One Wish (Hiroshima song) =

Single by Hiroshima

from the album Another Place
- Released: 1986
- Recorded: 1985
- Genre: Jazz-funk, smooth jazz, synthpop
- Length: 4:51
- Label: Epic
- Songwriter: Dan Kuramoto
- Producer: Dan Kuramoto

Hiroshima singles chronology
"San Say" (1983)	"One Wish" (1986)	"Come to Me" (1989)

Music video
- One Wish on YouTube

One Wish is a song performed by American jazz band Hiroshima that was released as the only single for the album Another Place.

== Reception ==
Brian Chin of Billboard described the single as "an extremely laid-back jazz-funk [song]."

== Remixes ==
The song was remixed by British composer Paul Hardcastle in 1986.

Architecture In Tokyo (now named young muscle) later made a vaporwave remix in 2013, which were sampled from Paul Hardcastle's remix.

== Chart performance ==
Chart (1986)	Position
Billboard Adult Contemporary	20

Chart (2010)	Position
Billboard Smooth Jazz songs	24
