= Look Out for Number 1 =

Look Out for #1

Studio album by the Brothers Johnson
- Released: 1976
- Recorded: 1975 – January 1976
- Studios: Record Plant, Westlake Audio, and Kendun Recorders, Los Angeles, California
- Genres: Soul; funk; disco
- Length: 34:30
- Label: A&M
- Producer: Quincy Jones

The Brothers Johnson chronology
Look Out for #1 (1976)	Right on Time (1977)

Look Out for #1 is the debut album by duo Brothers Johnson released in 1976 on A&M Records. The album peaked at No. 1 on the US Billboard Top Soul Albums chart, No. 3 on the US Billboard Top Jazz Albums chart and No. 9 on the US Billboard 200.

== Critical reception ==
Professional ratings
Review scores
Source	Rating
AllMusic	4/5 stars
The Rolling Stone Record Guide	2/5 stars

Craig Lytle of AllMusic remarked, "The Brothers Johnson first earned national recognition as recording artists by singing the sensuously funky mid-tempo number "Is It Love That We're Missin'," featured on Quincy Jones' album Mellow Madness. The dynamic duo maintains that same groove on this, its debut release for A&M Records."

== Track listing ==
All tracks composed by George and Louis Johnson; except where indicated

1. "I'll Be Good to You" (George Johnson, Louis Johnson, Sonora Sam) 4:44
2. "Thunder Thumbs and Lightnin' Licks" (Instrumental) (Dave Grusin, George Johnson, Louis Johnson, Paul Riser) 4:51
3. "Get the Funk Out Ma Face" (George Johnson, Louis Johnson, Quincy Jones) 2:27
4. "Tomorrow" (Instrumental) 2:58
5. "Free and Single" 4:07
6. "Come Together" (John Lennon, Paul McCartney) 4:12
7. "Land of Ladies" 4:30
8. "Dancin' and Prancin'" 3:01
9. "The Devil" 3:40

== Personnel ==
- George Johnson - Lead Guitar, Lead and Backing Vocals
- Louis Johnson - Guitar, Bass, Lead Vocals and Backing Vocals
- Dave Grusin - Acoustic Piano, Electric Piano, Synthesizer
- Don Lewis - Keyboards (Armand Pascettas Polyphonic Synthesized Keyboard System)
- Harvey Mason - Drums, Percussion
- Ian Underwood - Synthesizer
- Toots Thielemans - Harmonica
- Ralph MacDonald - Percussion
- Billy Cobham - Timbales
- Ernie Watts, Sahib Shihab, Terry Harrington - Saxophone, Flute
- Bill Lamb, Chuck Findley - Trumpet
- Glenn Ferris - Trombone
- Jesse Kirkland, Jim Gilstrap, Pepper Swinson, Syreeta Wright - Background vocals
- Lee Ritenour - Guitar on "Land of Ladies"
- Paul Riser - Horn arrangements

Technical

- Chris Brent, Peter Chaikin, Phil Schier - engineer, mixing
- Roland Young - art direction
- Elliot Gilbert - photography

== Charts and certifications ==
=== Charts ===
Year	Chart	Peak position
1976	Billboard Pop Albums	9
1976	Billboard Top Soul Albums	1
1976	Billboard Jazz Albums	3

=== Singles ===
Year	Single	Chart positions		
Year	Single	US	US R&B	US Dance
1976	"Get the Funk Out Ma Face"	30	4	11
1976	"I'll Be Good to You"	3	1	—
1977	"Free and Single"	—	26	—

=== Certifications ===
Region	Certification	Certified units/sales
United States (RIAA)	Platinum	1,000,000^{^}
^{^} Shipments figures based on certification alone.
