= Right on Time (Brothers Johnson album) =

Studio album by the Brothers Johnson
- Released: May 10, 1977
- Recorded: Feb 1 – Mar 21, 1977
- Studio: A&M (Hollywood)
- Genres: Funk; pop; disco
- Length: 32:04
- Label: A&M
- Producer: Quincy Jones

The Brothers Johnson chronology
Look Out for #1 (1976)	Right on Time (1977)	Blam! (1978)

Right on Time is the second album by the Los Angeles, California-based duo the Brothers Johnson. Released in 1977, the album peaked at number two on the R&B albums chart and number thirteen on the pop albums chart in the U.S. It includes the number-one R&B song "Strawberry Letter 23", and winner of a Grammy Award in 1978 for Best R&B Instrumental Performance, "Q".

== Critical reception ==
Professional ratings
Review scores
Source	Rating
AllMusic	4.5/5 stars
The Village Voice	C+

In a contemporary review for The Village Voice, music critic Robert Christgau gave the album a "C+" grade and panned the duo for how "bland" and lifeless they made their funk: "Pop professionalism reduced to a concept in which all annoyances and other signs of life are eliminated." In a retrospective review, AllMusic's Stephen Cook credited Quincy Jones for producing a "seamless mix of pop and funk."

== Track listing ==
1. "Runnin' for Your Lovin'" - (George Johnson, Louis Johnson) 5:05
2. "Free Yourself, Be Yourself" - (George Johnson, Louis Johnson) 4:14
3. "Q" (Instrumental) - (George Johnson, Louis Johnson) 3:25
4. "Right on Time" - (George Johnson, Louis Johnson, Quincy Jones) 3:50
5. "Strawberry Letter 23" - (Shuggie Otis) 4:58
6. "Brother Man" (Instrumental) - (Dave Grusin, George Johnson, Louis Johnson) 3:10
7. "Never Leave You Lonely" - (Louis Johnson, Peggy Jones, Valerie Johnson) 3:02
8. "Love Is" - (George Johnson, Louis Johnson, Peggy Jones, Quincy Jones) 4:20

== Personnel ==
- George Johnson – Lead Guitar, Lead and Backing Vocals
- Louis Johnson – Bass, Guitar, Piano, Synthesizer, Lead and Backing Vocals
- Harvey Mason, Sr. – Drums
- Lee Ritenour, David T. Walker – Guitar
- Dave Grusin, Ian Underwood, Michael Boddicker – Keyboards, Synthesizer
- Ralph MacDonald – Percussion
- Mic Gillette – Trombone, Trumpet
- Emilio Castillo – Tenor Saxophone
- Stephen Kupka – Baritone Saxophone
- Lenny Pickett – Alto Saxophone
- Greg Adams – Trumpet
- Alex Weir, Jim Gilstrap, Richard Heath, Mortonette Jenkins, Stephanie Spruill, Oren Waters, Alexandra Brown – Backing Vocals

== Charts and certifications ==
=== Charts ===
Year	Chart	Peak position
1977	US Billboard Pop Albums	13
1977	US Billboard Top Soul Albums	2
1977	US Billboard Jazz Albums	4
1977	New Zealand	34

=== Singles ===
Year	Single	Chart positions	
Year	Single	US	US R&B
1977	"Strawberry Letter 23"	5	1
1977	"Runnin' for Your Lovin'"	107	20
1978	"Love Is"	—	50

=== Certifications ===
Region	Certification	Certified units/sales
United States (RIAA)	Platinum	1,000,000^{^}
^{^} Shipments figures based on certification alone.
