= Welcome to the Club (The Brothers Johnson song) =

Single by the Brothers Johnson

from the album Blast!: The Latest and the Greatest
- Released: 1982
- Genre: soul, funk, R&B
- Length: 6:01
- Label: A&M
- Songwriters: Louis Johnson, Valerie Johnson
- Producers: Louis Johnson, George Johnson

The Brothers Johnson singles chronology
| "Dancin' Free" (1981) | "Welcome to the Club" (1982) | "I'm Giving You All of My Love" (1983) |

"Welcome to the Club" is a song by the Brothers Johnson from their compilation album, Blast!: The Latest and the Greatest, released in 1982 as a single on A&M Records. The single peaked at No. 13 on the US Billboard Hot Soul Songs chart.

== Critical reception ==
Alex Henderson of Allmusic exclaimed Welcome to the Club, "(isn't) "bad but (isn't) exceptional".
