= Light Up the Night (The Brothers Johnson album) =

Studio album by the Brothers Johnson
- Released: April 4, 1980
- Recorded: 1978–1980
- Studio: Allen Zentz, Hollywood, California; A&M, Hollywood, California; Kendun, Burbank, California
- Genre: R&B; funk; pop
- Length: 38:20
- Label: A&M
- Producer: Quincy Jones

The Brothers Johnson chronology
Blam! (1978)	Light Up the Night (1980)	Winners (1981)

Singles from Light Up the Night
- 1. "Stomp!" Released: February 6, 1980; 2. "Light Up the Night" Released: 1980; 3. "Treasure" Released: 1980

Professional ratings
Review scores
Source	Rating
AllMusic	4/5 stars
Smash Hits	5/10

Light Up the Night is the fourth album by the Los Angeles, California-based duo the Brothers Johnson, released in 1980. The album topped the U.S. R&B albums chart and reached number five on the pop albums chart. The single "Stomp!" became a dance hit, reaching number one on both the R&B singles and disco charts and top ten on the pop singles chart.

Light Up the Night was the final Brothers Johnson album to be produced by Quincy Jones. When Jones left A&M Records, he was contractually barred from having contact with the brothers.

This album includes the song "This Had to Be", co-written by Michael Jackson.

== Track listing ==
No.	Title	Writer(s)	Length
1.	"Stomp!"	Rod Temperton; Louis Johnson; George Johnson; Valerie Johnson	6:20
2.	"Light Up the Night"	Temperton; L. Johnson; G. Johnson	3:45
3.	"You Make Me Wanna Wiggle"	Temperton; L. Johnson; G. Johnson; V. Johnson	3:38
4.	"Treasure"	Temperton	4:11
5.	"This Had to Be"	Michael Jackson; L. Johnson; G. Johnson	5:08
6.	"All About the Heaven"	Temperton	3:59
7.	"Smilin' on Ya"	G. Johnson; Greg Phillinganes; L. Johnson; Jerry Hey	3:42
8.	"Closer to the One That You Love"	Temperton; L. Johnson; G. Johnson	3:11
9.	"Celebrations"	Temperton; L. Johnson; G. Johnson	4:26

== Personnel ==
The Brothers Johnson

- George Johnson – lead guitar, rhythm guitar, backing vocals, lead vocals (1–3, 5, 6, 8)
- Louis Johnson – acoustic piano, Prophet-5, guitars, lead guitar (3), bass, bass solo (1), backing vocals

Additional musicians

- Greg Phillinganes – synthesizers (1), acoustic piano, electric piano
- Rod Temperton – electric piano (1)
- Steve Porcaro – synthesizers, synthesizer programming
- John Robinson – drums
- Paulinho da Costa – percussion, vocal percussion (9)
- Richard Heath – percussion, lead and backing vocals (4)
- Kim Hutchcroft – flute, baritone saxophone, soprano saxophone, tenor saxophone
- Larry Williams – flute, alto saxophone, tenor saxophone, synthesizers (7, 9)
- Bill Reichenbach Jr. – euphonium, trombone, slide trumpet
- Gary Grant – trumpet, flugelhorn
- Jerry Hey – trumpet, flugelhorn, French horn
- Merry Clayton – backing vocals
- Jim Gilstrap – backing vocals
- Susaye Greene-Brown – backing vocals
- Josie James – backing vocals
- Valerie Johnson – backing vocals
- Quincy Jones – backing vocals
- Scherrie Payne – backing vocals
- Alex Weir – lead and backing vocals (4)
- Michael Jackson – backing vocals fills (5)

Music arrangements

- The Brothers Johnson – rhythm arrangements
- Quincy Jones – rhythm, synthesizer and BGV arrangements
- Rod Temperton – synthesizer arrangements, BGV arrangements
- Johnny Mandel – synthesizer arrangements
- Jerry Hey – horn and string arrangements
- Bill Reichenbach Jr. – string conductor
- Michael Jackson – BGV arrangements (5)

Production

- Quincy Jones – producer
- Bruce Swedien – recording, mixing
- Tim Gerrity – assistant engineer
- Ralph Osborn – assistant engineer
- Randy Pipes – assistant engineer
- John Van Nest – assistant engineer
- Bernie Grundman – mastering at A&M Studios
- Chuck Beeson – art direction
- Glen Wexler – art direction, cover concept, photography
- Ed Eckstien – cover concept
- Kurt Triffet – illustration
- The Fitzgerald/Hartley Co. – direction

== Charts and certifications ==
=== Charts ===
Year	Chart	Peak position
1980	US Billboard Pop Albums	5
1980	US Billboard Top Soul Albums	1
1980	New Zealand	4
1980	Norway	12
1980	Sweden	23
1980	Holland	43

=== Year-end charts ===
Year End Chart (1980)	Peak position
U.S. Billboard 200	38
U.S. Billboard Top Soul Albums	8

=== Singles ===
Year	Single	Chart positions		
Year	Single	US	US R&B	US Dance
1980	"Light Up the Night"	—	16	—
1980	"Stomp!"	7	1	1
1980	"Treasure"	73	36	—

=== Certifications ===
Region	Certification	Certified units/sales
United States (RIAA)	Platinum	1,000,000^{^}
New Zealand (RMNZ)	Gold	7,500^{^}
^{^} Shipments figures based on certification alone.
