= Winners (Brothers Johnson album) =

Studio album by the Brothers Johnson
- Released: 1981
- Studios: Studio 55, Ocean Way, Sunset, and A&M (Hollywood, California).
- Genres: Funk, pop
- Length: 38:43
- Label: A&M
- Producer: The Brothers Johnson

The Brothers Johnson chronology
Light Up the Night (1980)	Winners (1981)	Out of Control (1984)

Winners is a studio album by the Brothers Johnson, released in 1981.

== Critical reception ==
Professional ratings
Review scores
Source	Rating
AllMusic	3.5/5 stars
Sounds	4/5 stars

Alex Henderson of AllMusic found, "Winners was the first Brothers Johnson album that Jones didn't produce—and it was also their first disappointing album... Definitely not one of the Brothers Johnson's essential releases, Winners is only recommended to completists."

== Track listing ==
1. "The Real Thing" (George Johnson, Louis Johnson) - 3:48
2. "Dancin' Free" (Louis Johnson) - 3:44
3. "Sunlight" (George Johnson) - 3:43
4. "Teaser" (George Johnson) - 3:45
5. "Caught Up" (Louis Johnson, Valerie Johnson) - 4:01
6. "In the Way" (David Paich, Jeff Porcaro, Steve Porcaro) - 3:26
7. "I Want You" (Louis Johnson) - 5:13
8. "Do It for Love" (George Johnson) - 3:40
9. "Hot Mama" (George Johnson, Louis Johnson) - 3:23
10. "Daydreamer Dream" (Annie Herring) - 4:00

== Personnel ==
The Brothers Johnson

- George Johnson – lead vocals (1, 3, 4, 6, 8), electric guitars (1, 2, 4–6, 8, 9), acoustic guitars (3), lead guitars (6 and 9), handclaps (1, 4, 8), string arrangements (1), backing vocals (3, 8), vocals (6, 7, 9), bass guitar (8)
- Louis Johnson – bass guitar (1–7, 9, 10), guitars (1, 7, 9, 10), handclaps (1, 4), keyboards (2, 5, 7), vocals (7, 9), synth bass (9)

Additional musicians

- Greg Phillinganes – keyboards (1, 2, 5, 8)
- Jeff Lorber – keyboards (3), synthesizers (4)
- David Paich – synthesizers (3), synth solo (3), keyboards (4–8), acoustic piano (9)
- Steve Porcaro – keyboards (6), synthesizers (6)
- Annie Herring – acoustic piano (10)
- Steve Lukather – guitars (4, 7, 9), guitar solo (7, 9)
- John Robinson – drums (1)
- Jeff Porcaro – drums (2, 4–10)
- Gerry Brown – drums (3)
- Paulinho da Costa – percussion (1–4, 6–8), handclaps (1, 4), cowbell (9)
- Debbie Johnson – handclaps (8)
- Ernie Watts – saxophone solo (1)
- Jerry Hey – horn arrangements (1, 3, 4, 8), string arrangements (1, 3, 8)
- David Diggs – horn arrangements (2), string arrangements (2, 5, 7, 10)
- Day Askey Burke – backing vocals (1, 3, 4, 8, 10), handclaps (8)
- Ricky Heath – lead vocals (2), backing vocals (2, 4, 10), vocals (7)
- Lynn Davis – backing vocals (2, 10)
- Valerie Simpson – backing vocals (2, 4), vocals (5, 7), lead vocals (10)
- Yolanda "Yo-Yo" Smith – backing vocals (3)
- Lalomie Washburn – backing vocals (4)

Production

- The Brothers Johnson – producers, recording, mixing
- Jack Joseph Puig – recording, mixing
- Jim Cassell – assistant engineer
- Mark Ettel – assistant engineer
- Bobby Gerber – assistant engineer
- Don Koldon – assistant engineer
- Stephen Marcussen – assistant engineer
- Mike Reese – mastering
- Doug Sax – mastering
- The Mastering Lab (Hollywood, California) – mastering location
- Jeff Ayeroff – art direction
- Chuck Beeson – art direction, design
- Norman Seeff – photography
- Mick McGinty, Willardson & White, Inc. – medallion illustration
- The Fitzgerald/Hartley Co. – direction

== Charts ==
Year	Chart	Peak position
1981	US Billboard Top Soul Albums	10
1981	US Billboard Pop Albums	48
1981	Norway	21
