= Body Heat (Quincy Jones album) =

Studio album by Quincy Jones
- Released: May 1974
- Recorded: 1974
- Genre: Soul; pop
- Length: 38:31
- Label: A&M
- Producer: Quincy Jones, Ray Brown

Quincy Jones chronology
You've Got It Bad, Girl (1973)	Body Heat (1974)	Mellow Madness (1975)

Singles from Body Heat
- 1. "Boogie Joe the Grinder" Released: 1974; 2. "If I Ever Lose This Heaven" Released: 1974; 3. "Body Heat" Released: 1974

Professional ratings
Review scores
Source	Rating
AllMusic	4/5 stars
The Encyclopedia of Popular Music	4/5 stars
The Rolling Stone Jazz Record Guide	3/5 stars

Body Heat is an album by Quincy Jones.

== Track listing ==
1. "Body Heat" (Quincy Jones, Leon Ware, Bruce Fisher, Stanley "Stan" Richardson) – 3:58
2. "Soul Saga (Song of the Buffalo Soldier)" (Ray Brown, Jones, Tom Bahler, Joseph Greene) – 4:58
3. "Everything Must Change" (Benard Ighner) – 6:01 - vocals by Benard Ighner
4. "Boogie Joe the Grinder" (Jones, Dave Grusin, Bahler) – 3:09
5. "Everything Must Change (Reprise)" (Ighner) – 1:01
6. "One Track Mind" (Jones, Ware) – 6:14
7. "Just a Man" (Valdy) – 3:31
8. "Along Came Betty" (Benny Golson) – 4:47
9. "If I Ever Lose This Heaven" (Ware, Pam Sawyer) – 4:52 - vocals by Leon Ware & Minnie Riperton

== Personnel ==
- Guitar: Arthur Adams, Dennis Coffey, Eric Gale, Phil Upchurch, David T. Walker, Wah Wah Watson
- Bass: Max Bennett, Melvin Dunlap, Chuck Rainey
- Keyboards: Malcolm Cecil, Larry Dunn, Dave Grusin, Herbie Hancock, Bob James, Robert Margouleff,
  Mike Melvoin, Billy Preston, Richard Tee
- Drums: James Gadson, Dave Grusin, Paul Humphrey, Bernard Purdie, Grady Tate
- Percussion: Bobbye Hall
- Saxophone: Pete Christlieb, Jerome Richardson
- Harmonica: Tommy Morgan
- Flute: Hubert Laws
- Horns: Chuck Findley, Quincy Jones, Frank Rosolino
- Vocals: Tom Bahler, Bruce Fisher, Jim Gilstrap, Joseph Greene, Benard Ighner, Al Jarreau, Quincy Jones, Jesse Kirkland, Myrna Matthews, Minnie Riperton, Leon Ware, Carolyn Willis

== Charts ==
Body Heat was Quincy Jones' highest-charting album on the Billboard 200, peaking at number six.

Year	Album	Chart positions		
Year	Album	US	US R&B	US Jazz
1974	Body Heat	6	1	1

=== Singles ===
Year	Single	Chart positions		
Year	Single	US	US R&B	US Dance
1974	"Boogie Joe the Grinder"	—	70	—
1974	"If I Ever Lose This Heaven"	—	71	—
1974	"Body Heat"	—	85	—

== Certifications ==
Region	Certification	Certified units/sales
United States (RIAA)	Gold	500,000^{^}
^{^} Shipments figures based on certification alone.

== Samples ==
- "Body Heat"
  - "How Do U Want It" by 2Pac featuring K-Ci & JoJo on All Eyez on Me (1996)
  - "Temperature's Rising" by Mobb Deep featuring Crystal Johnson on The Infamous (1995)
  - "Taunted" by Raja-Nee on Hot & Ready (1994)
- "If I Ever Lose This Heaven"
  - "Foolin'" by De La Soul on Art Official Intelligence: Mosaic Thump (2000)
  - "Too Old For Me" by Jerome on Bad Boy Greatest Hits, Volume 1 (1998)
  - "Nobody Sound Like Me" by Xzibit featuring Montage One on 40 Dayz & 40 Nightz (1998)

== See also ==
- List of Billboard number-one R&B albums of 1974
