= Third Generation (album) =

1983 studio album by Hiroshima

Studio album by Hiroshima
- Released: 1983
- Genre: Jazz-funk smooth jazz, synthpop
- Length: 40:02
- Label: Epic
- Producer: Dan Kuramoto

Hiroshima chronology
Odori (1980)	Third Generation (1983)	Another Place (1985)

Singles from Third Generation
- 1. "San Say" Released: 1983

Third Generation is the third studio album released by American jazz band Hiroshima, released in 1983 by Epic Records. The album hit #142 on Billboard 200.

== Background ==
The album's title, "Third Generation", originated from band leader Dan Kuramoto's status as a "third generation" Japanese-American.

== Reception ==
Professional ratings
Review scores
Source	Rating
AllMusic	2/5 stars

In regards to the album, Billboard wrote "the group defies labels, playing the spectrum from rock to AC, and playing it brilliantly" and concluded that the album "was well worth the wait". Meanwhile, AllMusic gave the album two stars out of five.

== Track listing ==
Third Generation
No.	Title	Length
1.	"Heavenly Angel"	3:38
2.	"We Are"	4:02
3.	"Ren"	2:32
4.	"Do What You Can"	3:47
5.	"San Say"	5:04
6.	"Distant Thoughts"	5:55
7.	"From the Heart"	4:01
8.	"Long Walks"	4:22
9.	"Fifths"	5:42
10.	"Sukoshi Bit"	0:59

== Charts ==
Chart (1983)	Position
Billboard 200	142
Billboard Top Black Albums	50
Billboard Top Jazz Albums	10
