= Welcome to the Club (Manian song) =

Single by Manian

from the album Welcome to the Club (The Album)
- Released: February 20 2009
- Genre: Jumpstyle
- Length: 3:12
- Label: Zooland Records, All Around the World
- Songwriters: DJ Manian; Tony Cornelissen
- Producers: Manian; Yanou

Manian singles chronology
| "Ravers Fantasy" (2007) | "Welcome to the Club" (2009) | "Can’t Stop the Dancing" (2012) |

"Welcome to the Club" is a single by German disc jockey Manian. It was used as the opening theme for the Clubland Live! 2 and was subsequently added as the lead single to the 2010 studio album Welcome to the Club.

== Track listing ==
=== AATW promo CD ===
1. Welcome to the Club — 3:14
2. Welcome to the Club (Extended Mix) — 4:49
3. Welcome to the Club (Bassfreakerz Remix) — 5:55
4. Welcome to the Club (Hypasonic Remix) — 3:30
5. Welcome to the Club (Discotronic Remix) — 5:41
6. Welcome to the Club (DJ Gollum Remix) — 5:24
7. Welcome to the Club (Bootleg Mix) — 5:25

=== Digital ===
1. Welcome to the Club (Video Edit) — 3:12
2. Welcome to the Club (Original Mix) — 4:46
3. Welcome to the Club (Bootleg Radio Edit) — 3:52
4. Welcome to the Club (Bootleg Mix) — 5:24
5. Welcome to the Club (Discotronic Radio Edit) — 3:58
6. Welcome to the Club (Discotronic Remix) — 5:39
7. Welcome to the Club (DJ Gollum Radio Edit) — 3:29
8. Welcome to the Club (DJ Gollum Remix) — 5:22
9. Welcome to the Club (Bassfreakers Mix) — 5:53
10. Welcome to the Club (Hypasonic Remix) — 3:28
11. Welcome to the Club (DJ Drop In&Out Mix) — 3:33
12. Welcome to the Club (Caramba Traxx Short Remix) — 3:48
13. Welcome to the Club (Caramba Traxx Remix) — 5:44

== Charts ==
| Chart (2009) | Peak position |
|---|---|
| Austria (Hitparade Top 40) | 39 |
| UK (Singles) | 89 |
