= You Keep Me Coming Back =

Single by the Brothers Johnson

from the album Out of Control
- Released: 1984
- Genre: Soul music, funk, R&B
- Label: A&M
- Songwriter(s): Keg Johnson, Dana Marshall, Rickey Smith, Wardell Potts Jr.
- Producer(s): Keg Johnson, Leon F. Sylvers III

The Brothers Johnson singles chronology
"I'm Giving You All of My Love" (1983)	"You Keep Me Coming Back" (1984)	"Lovers Forever" (1984)

"You Keep Me Coming Back" is a song by the Brothers Johnson from their studio album, Out of Control, released in 1984 as a single on A&M Records. The single peaked at No. 12 on the US Billboard Hot Soul Songs chart and No. 22 on the US Billboard Dance Club Songs chart.

== Critical reception ==
Amy Hanson of Allmusic noted, "an interesting interplay between the strong bass and vocals, supported by a smattering of guitar and a markedly slow tempo".
