= George Johnson (musician) =

American jazz musician

George Henry Johnson (April 25, 1913 – June 26, 1987) was an American jazz reedist.

Johnson, who was born in Grand Rapids, Michigan, played in the United States with Benny Carter and Zack Whyte, then toured Europe as a member of Freddy Taylor's band in 1935; he remained in Paris for several years, playing with Garnet Clark, Django Reinhardt and Willie Lewis in addition to performing with his own bands. After returning to the US in 1939, he played with Frankie Newton for two years and then with Bill Coleman, John Kirby, Hot Lips Page, Raymond Scott, and Rex Stewart. He returned to Europe in 1946 and lived there the rest of his life, leading ensembles in Spain, France, and Switzerland before moving permanently to the Netherlands. Johnson died on June 26, 1987, at the age of 74.
