= Another Place (Hiroshima album) =

1985 studio album by Hiroshima

Studio album by Hiroshima
- Released: June 10, 1985
- Genre: Jazz-funk smooth jazz, synthpop
- Length: 39:37
- Label: Epic
- Producer: Dan Kuramoto

Hiroshima chronology
Third Generation (1983)	Another Place (1985)	Go (1987)

Singles from Another Place
- 1. "One Wish" Released: 1986

Another Place is the fourth studio album by American jazz band Hiroshima, released in 1985 by Epic Records. The album was notably the first gold record released by the band and was on the Billboard jazz chart for over a year.

== Reception ==
Professional ratings
Review scores
Source	Rating
AllMusic	2/5 stars

Billboard referred the album as an "interesting, though rather lightweight, brand of pop/fusion." AllMusic rated the album two stars out of five.

== Track listing ==
Another Place
No.	Title	Length
1.	"One Wish"	4:51
2.	"Save Yourself for Me"	4:35
3.	"Another Place"	3:29
4.	"I Do Remember"	4:33
5.	"The Game"	4:37
6.	"Undercover"	4:32
7.	"Stay Away"	4:37
8.	"What's It to Ya"	4:22
9.	"Touch and Go"	4:01

== Album Cover ==
The photograph on the album cover depicts a beach with two pegs stuck in the sand and wire appearing as though it connects them to a sea stack in the distance. It was taken by John Pfahl in 1975 and is titled "Triangle, Bermuda."

== Charts ==
=== Weekly charts ===
Chart (1986)	Position
Billboard 200	79
Billboard Top Jazz Albums	8

=== Year-end charts ===
Chart (1986)	Position
Billboard Top Jazz Albums	8
