= King Kong (soundtrack) =

King Kong (Original Motion Picture Soundtrack)

Film score by James Newton Howard
- Released: December 7, 2005
- Recorded: 2005
- Studio: Sony Scoring Stage, California; Todd-AO, Los Angeles
- Genre: Film score
- Length: 1:14:27
- Label: Decca
- Producer: James Newton Howard; Jim Weidman

James Newton Howard chronology
| Batman Begins (2005) | King Kong (Original Motion Picture Soundtrack) (2005) | Freedomland (2006) |

King Kong (Original Motion Picture Soundtrack) is the soundtrack album to the epic adventure monster film King Kong, directed by Peter Jackson. The film's music was initially set to be composed by Howard Shore, who recorded several cues for the film but opted out due to creative differences with the director. James Newton Howard replaced him and work on the film's score began in late October and was completed in late November, an overall duration of under six weeks. Howard stated that the film "[w]as the hardest to compose" due to the hectic scoring schedule as the film was set for release on December 14, 2005.

The score was recorded at the Sony Scoring Stage, California and Todd-AO, Los Angeles. Recording sessions consisted of a 108-piece orchestra and 40-member vocal choir. The score is heavily reliant on ethnic and varied instrumentation as well as ranging vocal sounds. While Howard produced much of the film's score, additional music production was done by Jim Weidman, who also worked as the music editor. It was released on December 7, 2005 by Decca Records and received positive critical response. Howard's score received several accolades, including a nomination for the Golden Globe Award for Best Original Score.

== Development ==
The film was initially set to be composed by Howard Shore, who worked with Jackson on The Lord of the Rings film series. Shore completed recording several cues in the film, but left the project in October 2005 due to creative differences. James Newton Howard was hired to be the film's composer after Shore's departure, and, after only two weeks, started recording the score at Sony Scoring Stage and Todd-AO in Los Angeles. As the film was scheduled for a December 2005 release, Howard was assigned to complete the score within five weeks, which he called the hardest challenge. To achieve this, he utilized eight orchestrators and three conductors in order to record 15-20 minutes per day. The recording sessions involved a 40-member voice choir and 108-piece orchestra, with separate sessions for percussion, ethnic instruments, and solo voices.

The sessions originated in New Zealand, when Shore was the composer, and was later relocated to California, which was a "scheduling nightmare," as most sessions were booked for November. Howard managed to record the score on weekends, and choral elements were recorded during night-time. The choral material consists of "strange, unsettling vocals," as well as "weird native sounds invented by Howard." Some of the major themes were composed in three days, and during the sessions he asked for assistance from music editor Jim Weidman, who worked on the score as an additional music producer.

Howard sent some of the score cues to Jackson through video-conferencing and telephone call. Utilizing live chat, Jackson heard some of the score cues, including Howard's "4M1," about which he commented, "It's a great, twisted, weird sort of sound." The scoring was completed by late November, two weeks before the scheduled release.

To fulfill Jackson's wish to pay homage to Max Steiner, the original composer of King Kong (1933), some of Steiner's original score was used late in the film when Kong is on public display in New York City.

== Track listing ==
All music is composed by James Newton Howard.

| No. | Title | Length |
|---|---|---|
| 1. | "King Kong" | 01:09 |
| 2. | "A Fateful Meeting" | 04:16 |
| 3. | "Defeat Is Always Momentary" | 02:48 |
| 4. | "It's In The Subtext" | 03:19 |
| 5. | "Two Grand" | 02:34 |
| 6. | "The Venture Departs" | 04:03 |
| 7. | "Last Blank Space On The Map" | 04:43 |
| 8. | "It's Deserted" | 07:08 |
| 9. | "Something Monstrous... Neither Beast Nor Man" | 02:38 |
| 10. | "Head Towards The Animals" | 02:48 |
| 11. | "Beautiful" | 04:08 |
| 12. | "Tooth And Claw" | 06:17 |
| 13. | "That's All There Is..." | 03:26 |
| 14. | "Captured" | 02:25 |
| 15. | "Central Park" | 04:36 |
| 16. | "The Empire State Building" | 02:36 |
| 17. | "Beauty Killed the Beast I" | 01:59 |
| 18. | "Beauty Killed the Beast II" | 02:22 |
| 19. | "Beauty Killed the Beast III" | 02:14 |
| 20. | "Beauty Killed the Beast IV" | 04:45 |
| 21. | "Beauty Killed the Beast V" | 04:13 |
| Total length: | | 74:27 |

== Additional music ==
The film's soundtrack includes Al Jolson's recording of "I'm Sitting on Top of the World," Peggy Lee's "Bye Bye Blackbird," and themes from Max Steiner's soundtrack for the original 1933 film, which are "Fanfares Nos. 1, 2 and 3," "The Sailors," "The Aeroplane," "Elevated Sequence," "Jungle Dance," "The Escape," and "Aboriginal Sacrifice Dance." The track "Beauty Killed the Beast" was re-recorded by Dirk Brossé and the Flemish Radio Orchestra to be included in the fan-made soundtrack for Harry Potter and the Half-Blood Prince (2009).

== Reception ==
Professional ratings
Review scores
| Source | Rating |
|---|---|
| SoundtrackNet | 4/5 stars |
| Allmusic | 3/5 stars |
| Movie Music UK | 4.5/5 stars |
| Filmtracks | 4/5 stars |

Jonathan Broxton wrote, "James Newton Howard reportedly has 'never worked so hard on a score,' and despite the scurrilous rumours of teams of ghost-writers being hired to help, the quality of the end result is there for all to see, irrespective of who wrote what. There are times when you have to do what you have to do just to get the job done." and concluded "King Kong is inarguably one of the finest action-adventure scores of the year". James Christopher Monger of Allmusic had stated, "Howard manages to pinch-hit his way through with the confidence of a starting player. Using the Depression era as a launching pad, he deftly whips jazz motifs, thunderous brass sections, and wistful choirs into a stew of 'silver screen'-meets-'blue screen' harmony that may not yield any memorable themes, but manages to illuminate the film's terror, humanity, and tragedy with irrefutable professionalism."

Filmtracks.com wrote, "Howard's score is very enjoyable, though one wishes that he would have made a few more nods to Steiner's work and incorporated more of the Kong-like sound effects outside of the island cues. A harmonically pleasing score from start to finish, Howard succeeds in the bouncing rhythms of his more playful interludes, as well as the broad strokes of strings for the love interest. An almost religious sensibility shines through in an ultra-dramatic series of cues at the end of the score, maybe due to the metaphorical struggles behind the Kong story, and while this may be a 180-degree turn from Steiner, it certainly excels in its mere beauty. Howard has produced the most easily listenable score of his career, but by no means his most creative or intellectual, and while this work will capture the attention of most casual film score collectors, it may not resonate as well with fans of the composer's eclectic styles." Mfiles wrote, "James Newton Howard put together something in the region of 2 hours of music for the film and the core of it has been captured on this album. The first third of the film and the soundtrack is concerned with scene setting. It establishes all the characters and their motivations, and why they end up visiting the mysterious island. The initial feeling imparted by the music is that something awaits around every corner. But once they reach the island and meet King Kong, it is clearly the relationship between Kong and the heroine which is central to this story. Although the action scenes are wonderfully realised and a feast for the eyes, it is the quieter moments which bring out the best in the soundtrack."

== Charts ==
| Chart (2005–2006) | Peak position |
|---|---|
| UK Soundtrack Albums (OCC) | 18 |
| US Billboard 200 | 35 |
| US Soundtrack Albums (Billboard) | 9 |

== Release history ==
| Region | Date | Label | Catalog Code | Ref. |
|---|---|---|---|---|
| United States | December 7, 2005 | Decca | 4765224 | |
| Canada | December 10, 2005 | Decca; UMG Recordings | B000571502 | |
| Europe | December 12, 2005 | Decca | B000571502 | |
| Russia | December 13, 2005 | UMG Russia | 2600732 | |
| Australasia | December 15, 2005 | UMG Australia | 4765224 | |
| France | December 19, 2005 | UMG France | 4765224 | |
| Japan | December 21, 2005 | UMG Japan | UCCL-1101 | |

== Accolades ==
| Award | Category | Nominee | Result | Ref. |
|---|---|---|---|---|
| ASCAP Awards | Top Box Office Films | James Newton Howard | Won | |
| Chicago Film Critics Association | Best Original Score | James Newton Howard | Nominated | |
| Golden Globe Awards | Best Original Score | James Newton Howard | Nominated | |
| International Film Music Critics Association | Best Original Score for an Action/Adventure/Thriller Film | James Newton Howard | Won | |
| International Film Music Critics Association | Film Score of the Year | James Newton Howard | Nominated | |
| Stinkers Bad Movie Awards | Most Intrusive Musical Score | James Newton Howard | Nominated | |
| World Soundtrack Awards | Soundtrack Composer of the Year | James Newton Howard | Nominated | |
| World Soundtrack Awards | Original Soundtrack of the Year | James Newton Howard | Nominated | |
