= Mellow Madness =

Studio album by Quincy Jones
- Released: August 1975
- Recorded: 1975; Record Plant, Los Angeles and Westlake Audio
- Genre: Jazz, R&B
- Length: 44:07
- Label: A&M
- Producer: Quincy Jones

Quincy Jones chronology
Body Heat (1974)	Mellow Madness (1975)	I Heard That!! (1976)

Professional ratings
Review scores
Source	Rating
AllMusic	2.5/5 stars
The Rolling Stone Jazz Record Guide	2/5 stars

Mellow Madness is a 1975 studio album by Quincy Jones. It was Jones's first album recorded since treatment for a cerebral aneurysm. The album introduced the R&B public to The Brothers Johnson, who co-wrote four of the album tracks.

== Track listing ==
Side one
No.	Title	Writer(s)	Featured musician(s)	Length
1.	"Is It Love That We're Missing?"	George Johnson; Debbie Smith	George Johnson (vocals)	3:52
2.	"Paranoid"	Joe Green	Leon Ware (vocals)	2:55
3.	"Mellow Madness"	Quincy Jones; Tom Bahler; Paulette McWilliams; Al Ciner	Paulette McWilliams (vocals)	3:27
4.	"Beautiful Black Girl"	Jones; Otis Smith	The Watts Prophets (poetry recitation)	6:12
5.	"Listen (What It Is)"	G. Johnson; Louis Johnson	George Johnson and Paulette McWilliams (vocals)	4:16

Side two
No.	Title	Writer(s)	Featured musician(s)	Length
1.	"Just a Little Taste of Me"	G. Johnson; L. Johnson	George Johnson	3:28
2.	"My Cherie Amour"	Stevie Wonder; Henry Cosby; Sylvia Moy	Leon Ware, Minnie Ripperton, and Paulette McWilliams (vocals); Hubert Laws (flute)	5:25
3.	"Tryin' to Find Out About You"	G. Johnson; L. Johnson	Harvey Mason (drums)	3:02
4.	"Cry Baby"	Jones; Wah Wah Watson; Robert Bryant	Wah Wah Watson (guitar, voice bag, vocals)	4:29
5.	"Bluesette"	Norman Gimbel; Jean "Toots" Thielemans	Jean "Toots" Thielemans (whistling, guitar solo); Frank Rosolino (trombone solo)	7:01

== Personnel ==
- Quincy Jones – producer, arranger, keyboards, trumpet, background vocals

Musicians

- Wah Wah Watson, George Johnson – guitars
- Toots Thielemans – guitar (track 10)
- Dennis Budimir – guitar (track 7)
- Louis Johnson – bass guitar
- Chuck Rainey – bass guitar (track 10)
- Max Bennett – bass guitar (track 7)
- Don Grusin, Dave Grusin, Jerry Peters – keyboards
- Mike Melvoin – keyboards (track 7)
- Bill Lamb, Chuck Findley – trumpets
- Tom Bahler – trumpet, background vocals
- Frank Rosolino, George Bohanon – trombones
- Ernie Krivda, Sahib Shihab, Jerome Richardson – saxophones
- Hubert Laws – flute (track 7)
- Tommy Morgan – bass harmonica (track 6)
- Harvey Mason – drums
- Grady Tate – drums (track 10)
- Ralph MacDonald – conga, percussion
- Ian Underwood – synthesizer programming
- Paulette McWilliams, Jim Gilstrap, Joe Green, Jesse Kirkland, Myrna Matthews, Carolyn Willis, Leon Ware – background vocals
- Minnie Riperton – background vocals (track 7)

Technical personnel

- Tom Bahler – assistant arranging
- Paul Riser – assistant arranging
- Phil Schier – engineer
- Joan DeCola – assistant engineer

== Charts ==
Year	Album	Chart positions		
Year	Album	US	US R&B	US Jazz
1975	Mellow Madness	16	3	1

=== Singles ===
Year	Single	Chart positions		
Year	Single	US	US R&B	US Dance
1975	"Is It Love That We're Missing?"	70	18	—
1976	"Mellow Madness"	—	82	—
