= Geary Lanier Faggett =

American singer-songwriter (died 2019)

- Birth name: Geary Lanier Faggett
- Born: September 17, 1953
- Origin: Los Angeles, California
- Died: October 28, 2019
- Genres: R&B, jazz, gospel
- Occupation(s): Singer-songwriter, record producer, music producer, actor, keyboardist
- Instrument(s): Vocals, keyboards
- Years active: 1970's–2019

Geary Faggett (Born September 17, 1953, died October 28, 2019), was an American singer-songwriter. His songs have been performed by vocalists such as Deniece Williams, Rodena Preston, James Cleveland, and Whitney Houston.

== Early life ==
Geary Lanier Faggett was born into a musical family in Los Angeles and raised in Compton, California. His father was a pastor and his mother was a classically trained pianist. His mother discovered his ability to play piano at the age of 3 and began to train him. Later, she would send him to two different special music schools. Faggett was considered a "kid genius" with an IQ of 176. In junior high school, he would sit and write music during the lunch breaks instead of joining the other students and by the age of 15 Faggett performed professionally for the first time at Loyola University -where was also taking summer courses. That same year, his first professional recording was "Have Mercy on Me" for B&B records and released as a single. Faggett served as the music specialist at Centennial High School and during this time he discovered the amazing talents of some of the students and started to put together a group in 1970. He decided to name it "The Geary Faggett Ensemble" with the advice of his twelfth grade teacher, Jackie Dillard. The Ensemble began to gain much popularity performing on gospel music marathons that would air in LA & Southern California areas during the Gospel Music Era with acts such as James Cleveland, Rodena Preston, Henry Jackson Company, LA community Choir, and Terry-Lynn Community Choir.

== Career ==
They soon caught the eye of Byron Spears, owner of BeeGee Records, and he signed them and released their debut project "Someone's Watching You". Once the group began to grow in popularity, Faggett and the Ensemble began to be called for recording sessions. The ensemble were steadily recording for music and film sessions such as "The Color Purple", "St. Elmo’s Fire", David Peaston, Michael Jackson, "Primary Colors", Quincy Jones, Sandra Crouch and Andrae Crouch. Faggett also served as a musical director and toured with Andrae Crouch. During the vocal session of "Like A Prayer" when there was a discrepancy in the music, Faggett was presented the opportunity to play for Madonna and she became impressed with his musicianship and invited him back to play on some more tracks on her album. Faggett's music has been recorded by many well known artists namely Rodena Preston, Deniece Williams, LA Mass Choir, LA community choir and most notably James Cleveland's hit "If We Never Pass This Way Again". Whitney Houston performed that same song on her My Love is Your Love Tour in 1999 and on her 2004 Tour with Natalie Cole and Dionne Warwick. He was also a Founding Board Member of Power of Positive Music Movement, a 501c3 nonprofit in Los Angeles that supports art and humanities.

== Death ==
He died on October 28, 2019.
