= I'll Be Good to You =

1976 single by the Brothers Johnson

- US single picture sleeve

Single by The Brothers Johnson

from the album Look Out for #1
- B-side: "The Devil"
- Released: April 1976
- Genre: R&B, disco
- Length: 3:30 (single edit); 4:44 (album version)
- Label: A&M
- Songwriters: George Johnson; Louis Johnson; Sonora Sam
- Producer: Quincy Jones

The Brothers Johnson singles chronology
"I'll Be Good to You" (1976)	"Get the Funk Out Ma Face" (1976)

"I'll Be Good to You"

Single by Quincy Jones featuring Ray Charles and Chaka Khan

from the album Back on the Block
- Released: September 22, 1989
- Genre: New jack swing
- Length: 4:17 (single edit); 4:54 (album version)
- Label: Qwest; Warner Bros.
- Songwriters: George Johnson; Louis Johnson; Sonora Sam
- Producer: Quincy Jones

Quincy Jones singles chronology
"I'll Be Good to You" (1989)	"The Secret Garden (Sweet Seduction Suite)" (1990)

Audio
- "I'll Be Good to You" by Quincy Jones on YouTube

"I'll Be Good to You" is a 1976 song by R&B duo the Brothers Johnson. George Johnson, one of the two Johnson brothers in the band, wrote the song after deciding to commit to a relationship with one woman, instead of dating several at a time. While George was recording a demo for the song, family friend Sonora Sam came by and added some lyrics. Brothers Johnson producer and mentor Quincy Jones heard the song, liked it, and convinced George to sing lead on the finished track. Released from their debut album, Look Out for #1, it was a top-ten hit on the Billboard Hot 100 chart, peaking at number three, and a number one song on the Billboard R&B chart during the summer of 1976. The single was later certified gold by the RIAA.

Thirteen years later in 1989, it became a number one R&B hit again, with Chaka Khan and Ray Charles doing the lead vocals on Quincy Jones' Back on the Block album, and went to number eighteen on the Billboard Hot 100 singles chart. It also topped the Billboard Dance chart in early 1990. This was Ray Charles' first No. 1 R&B hit in twenty-four years.

== Charts ==
=== The Brothers Johnson version ===
==== Weekly charts ====
Chart (1976)	Peak position
Canada (RPM)	12
US Billboard Hot 100	3
US Hot Soul Singles (Billboard)	1
US Cash Box Top 100	7

==== Year-end charts ====
Chart (1976)	Position
Canada (RPM)	120
US Billboard Hot 100	61
US Cash Box Top 100	68

=== Quincy Jones featuring Ray Charles and Chaka Khan version ===
==== Weekly charts ====
Chart (1989–90)	Peak position
Belgium (Ultratop 50 Flanders)	34
Canada Top Singles (RPM)	46
Germany (GfK)	28
Ireland (IRMA)	18
Italy Airplay (Music & Media)	6
Netherlands (Single Top 100)	38
New Zealand (Recorded Music NZ)	7
UK Singles (Official Charts)	21
US Billboard Hot 100	18
US Adult Contemporary (Billboard)	30
US Hot R&B/Hip-Hop Songs (Billboard)	1
US Dance Club Songs (Billboard)	1

==== Year-end charts ====
Chart (1990)	Position
UK Club Chart (Record Mirror)	59

== Personnel ==
- Ray Charles, Chaka Khan: lead vocals featured rap artist on remix Kyle "Magic" Jackson
- Quincy Jones: producer, vocal and rhythm arranger
- David Paich, Greg Phillinganes, Ian Prince: keyboards
- Louis Johnson: Moog synthesizer bass, Fender slap bass, background vocals
- Ian Underwood, Larry Williams, Michael Boddicker, Steve Porcaro: synthesizer programming
- Bruce Swedien: drum programming
- Harvey Mason: hi-hat, cymbals
- George Johnson: guitar, background vocals
- James Ingram, James Gilstrap, Phil Perry, Siedah Garrett, Syreeta Wright: background vocals

== Cover versions ==
- It was later covered by Vanessa Williams and James "D. Train" Williams on Vanessa's 2005 studio album Everlasting Love.
- Boney James covered the song on his 2009 studio album Send One Your Love.

== See also ==
- List of number-one R&B singles of 1976 (U.S.)
- List of number-one R&B singles of 1989 (U.S.)
- List of number-one dance singles of 1990 (U.S.)
