= Hiroshima (band) =

American jazz band

- Origin: Los Angeles, California
- Genres: Smooth jazz, R&B, pop, world music
- Years active: 1974–present
- Labels: Arista, Epic, Qwest, Heads Up
- Members: Dan Kuramoto; June Kuramoto; Danny Yamamoto; Dean Cortez; Kimo Cornwell
- Past members: Jess Acuna; Jeanette Clinger; Peter Hata; Dave Iwataki; Teri Koide; Shoj Kameda; Teri Kusumoto; Barbara Long; Richard Mathews; Dane Matsumura; Johnny Mori; Margaret "Machun" Sasaki-Taylor; John Shipley; Terry Steele
- Website: hiroshimamusic.com

Hiroshima is an American band formed in 1974 that incorporates Japanese instruments in its music. Hiroshima has sold over four million albums around the world.

== Biography ==
Dan Kuramoto, Hiroshima's leader, is from East Los Angeles. He attended California State University, Long Beach, then led its Asian-American studies department. Through playing in a band on weekends he met June Kuramoto, a native of Japan who grew up in Los Angeles and played koto, a Japanese stringed instrument. Kuramoto admired Earth, Wind, and Fire for the way it combined jazz and R&B, and Santana for his identification with Latinos. He wanted to create a band that would represent Asian Americans. He named it after the Japanese city Hiroshima, which was mostly destroyed by an atomic weapon at the end of World War II.

Hiroshima's debut album sold more than 100,000 copies in its first three months. The band's second album yielded the song "Winds of Change", which received a Grammy Award nomination for Best R&B Instrumental. Hiroshima got its first gold album in 1985 with Another Place and the second with Go which followed it. The album Legacy was nominated for Best Pop Instrumental Album in 2010. Hiroshima has sold more than four million albums worldwide. In 1990, the band was the opening act for Miles Davis, and in 1988 they played with T-Square at the Hibiya Open-Air Concert Hall.

Hiroshima consists of Dan Kuramoto (saxophone, flute, keyboards, shakuhachi), June Kuramoto (koto), Kimo Cornwell (keyboards), Dean Cortez (bass guitar), and Danny Yamamoto (drums and taiko).

== Awards and honors ==
Hiroshima was given the Visionary Award by East West Players, the oldest Asian Pacific American theatre company in the United States, for the band's "Impact on the Asian Pacific American (APA) community through their artistic excellence and support of the Asian Pacific American performing arts."

== Members ==
- Dan Kuramoto (1974–present) (saxophone, flute, shakuhachi, keyboards, percussion)
- June Kuramoto (1974–present) (koto)
- Danny Yamamoto (1974–present) (drums, keyboards, taiko, percussion)
- Dean Cortez (1986–present) (bass guitar)
- Kimo Cornwell (1987–present) (keyboards)

=== Past ===
- Johnny Mori (taiko, percussion, 1974–2003)
- Peter Hata (guitar, 1974–1984)
- Dave Iwataki (keyboards, 1974–1977)
- Dane Matsumura (bass guitar, 1977–1980)
- John Shipley (keyboards, 1977-1978)
- Richard Matthews (1979-1980) (keyboards)
- Teri Kusumoto (vocals, 1977–1982)
- Jesse Acuna (percussion, vocals, 1977–1982)
- Barbara Long (vocals, 1985 album Another Place, 1987 album Go)
- Margaret Sasaki-Taylor "Machun" (vocals, 1989 album East)
- Jeanette Clinger (vocals, 1992 album Providence)
- Teri Koide (vocals, 1994 album LA)
- Terry Steele (vocals, 1999 album Between Black & White)
- Shoji Kameda (taiko, throat singer, 2003-2016)

== Discography ==
Title	Year	Label
Hiroshima	1979	Arista
Odori	1980	Arista
Third Generation	1983	Epic
Another Place	1985	Epic
Ongaku	1986	Arista
Go	1987	Epic
East	1989	Epic
Providence	1992	Epic
L.A.	1994	Qwest
Best Of Hiroshima	1994	Epic
Urban World Music	1996	Qwest
Between Black and White	1999	Windham Hill
The Bridge	2003	Heads Up
Spirit of the Season	2004	Heads Up
Obon	2005	Heads Up
Little Tokyo	2007	Heads Up
Legacy	2009	Heads Up
Departure	2011	Hiroshima
J-Town Beat	2013	CD Baby/Hiroshima
Songs With Words	2015	Hiroshima
2020	2021	Hiroshima
