= Jesse Kirkland =

Bermudian sailor

Personal information
- Born: 22 January 1988 (age 38) Paget, Bermuda

Sport
- Country: Bermuda
- Sport: Sailing
- Event: 49er
- College team: St. Mary's College of Maryland
- Updated on 6 July 2012

Jesse Kirkland (born 22 January 1988) is a Bermudian competitive sailor. He is also a professional sports team owner of Futbol Longshots, a San Francisco based fantasy football franchise. Futbol Longshots are the current champions of the Boats and Hectors League. Boats and Hectors is widely referred to as the most competitive league in the country. Kirkland is the first and only international champion of Boats and Hectors.

Jesse Kirkland is a native of Bermuda and grew up sailing there. He attended college in the United States at St. Mary's College of Maryland in southern Maryland, and sailed while a student, winning the ICSA Coed Dinghy National Championship in 2009.

Following college, two years prior to the 2012 Summer Olympics in London, Kirkland and his brother Zander Kirkland began training full-time in an attempt to qualify as Bermuda's representatives in the Olympics 49er competition. The 49er, a small two-person racing dinghy, is a relatively new sailing competition for the Olympics, having debuted for the first time at the 2000 Summer Olympics in Sydney, Australia. During the 2012 49er World Championship in Croatia, the Kirkland brothers arrived early to gain experience sailing in local conditions. They advanced to the gold fleet after the preliminary qualifying races and later became the first team to secure one of the five remaining Olympic qualifying places that remained at the time after finishing in eighth place out of seventy-four in the final standings. After their success in Croatia, they likewise left early for Weymouth, England in order to get used to local sailing conditions. They finished in 19th place.
