= Gary Grant (musician) =

American musician (1945–2024)

- Born: Gary Emory Grant; July 13, 1945; United States
- Died: June 26, 2024 (aged 78)
- Genres: Jazz; jazz-rock; jazz fusion; pop
- Occupation: Musician
- Instrument: Trumpet
- Years active: 1970s–2024

Gary Emory Grant (July 13, 1945 – June 26, 2024) was an American trumpet player, composer and producer, and session musician who played on hundreds of commercial recordings.

Gary collaborated with a variety of artists such as Barbra Streisand, Michael Jackson, Whitney Houston, Celine Dion, Toni Braxton, Brian McKnight, Frank Sinatra, Natalie Cole, Earth, Wind & Fire, Go West, Take 6, Elton John and Aerosmith. Additionally, Gary worked with producers such as David Foster, Glenn Ballard, Dave Grusin, and Babyface. In addition, he was a guest artist with the Chicago 17 horns. From 2008, he was occupied co/producing, co/arranging & engineering original songs written by colleague and musical partner Rich Pulin.

== Biography ==
Grant grew up in a musical family, with his father Harry Grant providing him with early training. He later attended North Texas State University and went on a two-year tour with the Woody Herman band as a lead trumpet player and featured soloist. After spending four years in Hawaii, Gary worked with a talented group of musicians and played with his own big band and 7 piece ensemble.

In 1975, Grant moved to Los Angeles to pursue a career as a full-time musician.

Grant also recorded with Quincy Jones on the albums Back on the Block and Q's Jook Joint.

Grant was a long-time member of the Jerry Hey horn section The Jerry Hey Horns. He died on June 26, 2024.
