= The Brothers Johnson =

American funk and R&B band

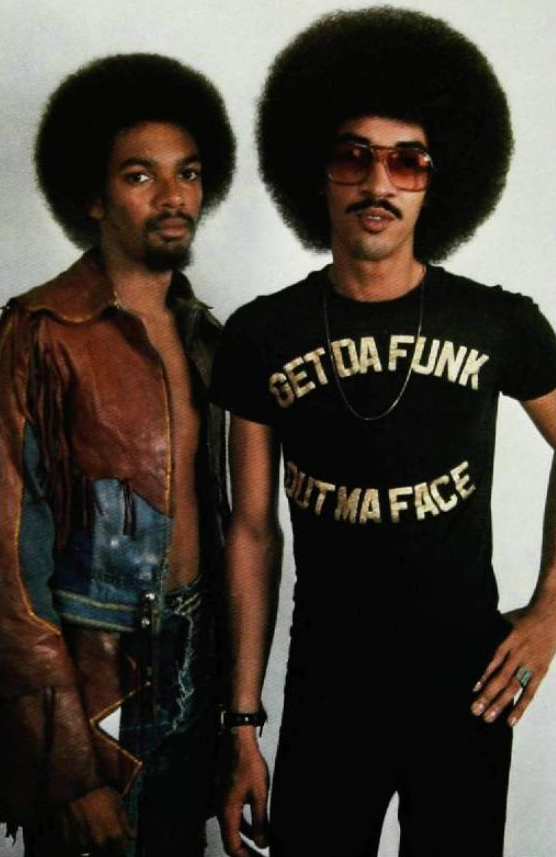
- Brothers Johnson in 1976 (Louis and George)

Background information
- Also known as: Brothers Johnson
- Origin: Los Angeles, California, United States
- Genres: R&B; funk; disco
- Years active: 1975–1982, 1984–2015
- Labels: A&M, Capitol
- Past members: George Johnson; Louis Johnson; Alex Weir; Richard Heath; Bobby Rodriguez; Wayne Vaughn; Ricky Lawson; Richard Diamond; Michael "Patches" Stewart; Michael Perkins; Malcolm Robinson; Mark Johnson; Arthur Arnold

The Brothers Johnson was an American funk and R&B band consisting of the American brothers George ("Lightnin' Licks") and Louis E. Johnson ("Thunder Thumbs"). They achieved their greatest success from the mid-1970s to early 1980s, with three singles topping the R&B charts ("I'll Be Good to You", "Strawberry Letter 23", and "Stomp!").

== Background ==
=== Formation ===
Guitarist/vocalist George and bassist/vocalist Louis formed the band Johnson Three Plus One with older brother Tommy and their cousin Alex Weir while attending school in Los Angeles, California. When they became professionals, the band backed such touring R&B acts as Bobby Womack and the Supremes. George and Louis Johnson later joined Billy Preston's band and wrote selections for his albums Music Is My Life and The Kids & Me before leaving his group in 1973. In 1976, the Brothers covered the Beatles' song, "Hey Jude", for the musical documentary All This and World War II.

Quincy Jones hired them to play on his LP Mellow Madness, and recorded four of their songs, including "Is It Love That We're Missin'?" and "Just a Taste of Me".

After touring with various artists including Bobby Womack and Billy Preston, they were hired by Quincy Jones for a tour in Japan and produced their debut album Look Out for #1, released in March 1976, which went to number 9 on the U.S. Billboard chart. Their Right on Time album was released in May 1977 and reached number 13 on the Billboard Hot 200. Blam!! came out in August 1978 and reached number 7 on the Billboard 200.

Two of the band's songs were featured on the soundtrack of the 1976 film Mother, Jugs & Speed and one on the 1997 film Jackie Brown. The instrumental track "Thunder Thumbs and Lightnin' Licks" refers to the brothers' nicknames. "Get the Funk Out Ma Face" was cowritten with Quincy Jones.

Their popular album Light Up the Night was released in March 1980 and rose to #5 on the Billboard 200. It was number 46 on the "Top 100 LPs of 1980" list in Rolling Stone. The brothers self-produced the subsequent album, Winners; released in July 1981, it only reached #48 on the Billboard 200.

Among their most popular songs are "I'll Be Good to You" (Billboard Hot 100 #3 in 1976) which prominently featured Syreeta Wright, "Strawberry Letter 23" (Hot 100 #5 in 1977, originally recorded by Shuggie Otis), "Ain't We Funkin' Now" (1978), and "Stomp!" (Hot 100 #7 and Hot Dance Music/Club Play #1 in 1980). Their styles include funk, and R&B ballads. Each album also included at least one instrumental cut that would either be considered light jazz ("Tomorrow", 1976; "Q", 1977; "Streetwave", 1978; "Smilin' On Ya", 1980; "Tokyo", 1984) or funk ("Thunder Thumbs & Lightnin' Licks", 1976; "Brother Man", 1977; "Mista' Cool", 1978; "Celebrations", 1980).

=== 1982 split ===
The duo split up in 1982 to pursue separate projects.

=== Louis's solo work ===
Louis Johnson recorded a gospel music album in 1981 with his own group Passage, which included his then-wife Valerie Johnson and former Brothers Johnson percussionist/singer Richard Heath. He played bass on Michael Jackson's Thriller. In 1985 he recorded a single, "Kinky", on Capitol Records; it appears on his Evolution album which was exclusively released in Europe that year. Louis then made 3 instructional videotapes for the Starlicks video-distribution company in which he shared his bass-playing skills. The first was released in 1985. He then settled down to enjoy family life with his wife and son, but by 1988 his then-manager Diane Taren talked him into going back into the recording studio. He started his bass academy during the 1990s and gave workshop clinics via his own Website. Louis Johnson died on May 21, 2015, age 60. His last performance was in 2013.

Tommy Johnson left the group and had a 29-year career with the Los Angeles Fire Department.

=== George's solo work ===
George Johnson released one single in 1985, "Back Against the Wall", on Quincy Jones' own Qwest label. A complete album (recorded but unreleased) came from that session, as George confirmed when he and Louis were interviewed around 1987/88 for Blues & Soul Magazine in the United Kingdom (see link below). George also delivered guitar work for Steve Arrington's album Dancing in the Key of Life (1985) and had ad-libbed vocals on the track "Think Back And Remember" from the Galaxian album by the Jeff Lorber Fusion, released in 1981 on Arista Records.

=== Various 1980s reunions and other projects ===
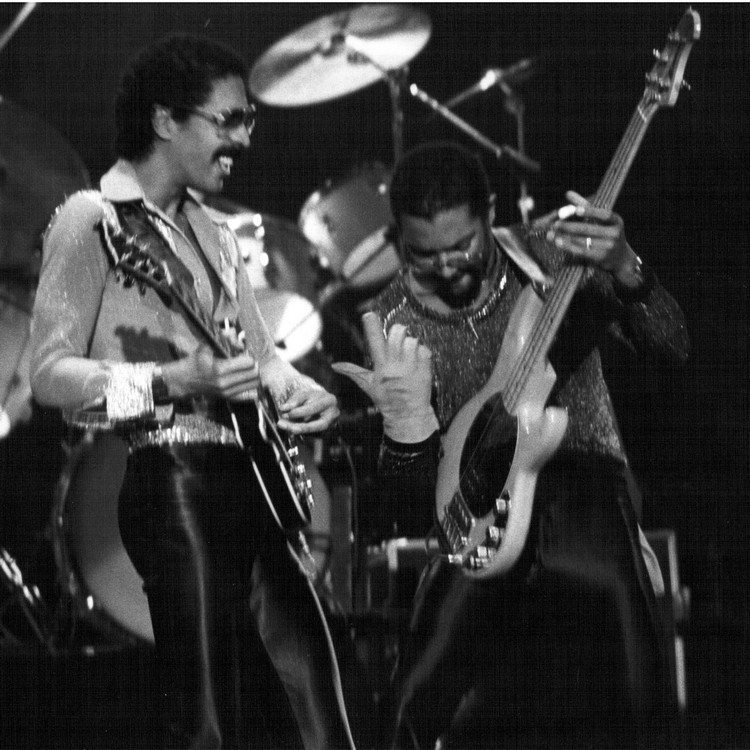
Brothers Johnson in 1980

In 1984 the brothers reunited in the recording studio. The resulting Leon Sylvers-produced LP, Out of Control, did not equal their past success, but it did garner them another R&B hit with "You Keep Me Coming Back". They teamed up again in 1988 to record Kickin', the title track of which ("Kick It to the Curb") was a collaboration with their then-neighbor Irene Cara. Although "Kick It to the Curb" became a minor hit, the album's success was even more limited.

Between the two albums, both George and Louis released their aforementioned solo material and also appeared on Street Shadows, an album by keyboardist/arranger David Diggs, who had provided horn and string arrangements for Winners, Blast!, and Louis' Passage. "Last Night", Streets opening track showcases George's bass-guitar playing. He previously showed his bass skills on tracks like "Teaser" and "The Great Awaking" from Winners, the same way Louis shows his guitar skills on the duo's various compositions.

Also during this time, the band's song "Tomorrow" (originally an instrumental on the B-side of "Get the Funk Out Ma Face") was recorded with vocals by Tevin Campbell for Quincy Jones' Back on the Block release in 1989. This album also included Jones' hit remake of the Brothers Johnson's "I'll Be Good to You", featuring Ray Charles and Chaka Khan.

Besides the brothers' brief appearance in Japan around 1994 and George guest-appearing at a Graham Central Station concert in Japan (including a released double-CD), the duo launched an expanded US tour in 2002 which got positive, wide exposure. It was visited by many fans and various artists in the entertainment business. Along with a website and discussion-forum, online visitors could share their experiences of the shows by wandering through the Land of Ladies and reliving Funkadelia's heyday. A few years later, a combi-release of live-CD + DVD was released under the name Strawberry Letter 23: Live.

In 2006, Louis gave a duo-show with a drummer on the Poetry in Motion 1 Festival in Maryland. In late 2007 George performed with his own band at a Detroit festival, including a persona called Sir Nose. These days George performs with a special band, an initiative of Michael Henderson that includes Adina Howard, Cherrelle, Ray Parker Jr., and others.

Louis Johnson was found dead at his home in Las Vegas, May 21, 2015. The cause of death was gastrointestinal bleeding of the esophagus.

In 2022, the brothers' song "Ain't We Funkin' Now" was sampled in singer Harry Styles' song 'Daydreaming" from his third album Harry's House.

== Discography ==
=== Studio albums ===
Year	Album	Peak chart positions								Certifications	Record label
Year	Album	US	US R&B	US Jazz	AUS	CAN	NL	NZ	UK	Certifications	Record label
1976	Look Out for #1	9	1	3	—	25	—	—	—	RIAA: Platinum	A&M
1977	Right on Time	13	2	4	43	36	—	34	—	RIAA: Platinum	A&M
1978	Blam!	7	1	—	—	51	—	—	48	RIAA: Platinum	A&M
1980	Light Up the Night	5	1	—	57	58	43	4	22	RIAA: Platinum; RMNZ: Gold	A&M
1981	Winners	48	10	—	—	—	—	—	42		A&M
1984	Out of Control	91	20	—	—	—	—	—	—		A&M
1988	Kickin'	—	—	—	—	—	—	—	—		A&M
"—" denotes a recording that did not chart or was not released in that territory.

=== Live albums ===
- Strawberry Letter 23: Live (2004, Goldenlane)

=== Compilation albums ===
Year	Album	Peak positions			Record label
Year	Album	US	US R&B	NZ	Record label
1982	Blast!: The Latest and the Greatest	138	23	18	A&M
1987	Classics, Vol. 11	—	—	—	A&M
1996	Greatest Hits	—	—	—	A&M
1998	The Best of the Brothers Johnson	—	—	—	PolyGram
2000	20th Century Masters - The Millennium Collection: The Best of the Brothers Johnson	—	—	—	A&M
2003	The Universal Masters Collection	—	—	—	UMG
2003	Strawberry Letter 23: The Best of the Brothers Johnson	—	—	—	A&M
2013	Stomp: The Best of the Brothers Johnson	—	—	—	UMG
"—" denotes a recording that did not chart or was not released in that territory.

=== Singles ===
Year	Single	Peak chart positions								Certifications	Album
Year	Single	US	US R&B	US Dan	AUS	CAN	NL	NZ	UK	Certifications	Album
1976	"I'll Be Good to You"	3	1	—	—	12	—	—	—	RIAA: Gold	Look Out for #1
1976	"Get The Funk Out Ma Face"	30	4	15	—	31	—	—	—		Look Out for #1
1976	"Free and Single"	—	26	—	—	—	—	—	—		Look Out for #1
1977	"Strawberry Letter 23"	5	1	—	25	8	25	2	35	RIAA: Gold	Right on Time
1977	"Right on Time" (UK-only release)	—	—	—	—	—	—	—	52 (Note: Chart position is from the official UK "Breakers List".)		Right on Time
1977	"Runnin' for Your Lovin'"	—	20	—	—	—	—	—	—		Right on Time
1978	"Love Is"	—	50	—	—	—	—	—	—		Right on Time
1978	"Ride-O-Rocket"	—	45	—	—	—	—	—	50		Blam!!
1978	"Ain't We Funkin' Now"	—	45	—	—	—	—	—	43		Blam!!
1980	"Stomp!"	7	1	1	13	49	11	1	6	RMNZ: Gold	Light Up the Night
1980	"Light Up the Night"	—	16	—	—	—	37	19	47		Light Up the Night
1980	"Treasure"	73	36	—	—	—	—	—	—		Light Up the Night
1981	"The Real Thing"	67	11	—	—	—	—	34	50		Winners
1981	"Dancin' Free"	—	51	—	—	—	—	—	—		Winners
1982	"Welcome to the Club"	—	13	—	—	—	—	36	—		Blast!: The Latest and the Greatest
1983	"I'm Giving You All of My Love"	—	75	—	—	—	—	—	—		Blast!: The Latest and the Greatest
1984	"You Keep Me Coming Back"	102	12	22	—	—	—	—	77		Out of Control
1984	"Lovers Forever"	—	—	—	—	—	—	—	—		Out of Control
1988	"Kick It to the Curb"	—	52	—	—	—	—	—	—		Kickin'
1988	"Party Avenue"	—	—	—	—	—	—	—	—		Kickin'
1988	"Still in Love"	—	—	—	—	—	—	—	—		Kickin'
"—" denotes a recording that did not chart or was not released in that territory.

== Videography ==
- 1977 – Right on Time
- 1980 – Stomp
- 1981 – The Real Thing
- 1988 – Kick It to the Curb

== See also ==
- List of artists who reached number one on the U.S. dance chart
- List of Number 1 Dance Hits (United States)
