= Louis Johnson (bassist) =

American bass guitarist (1955–2015)

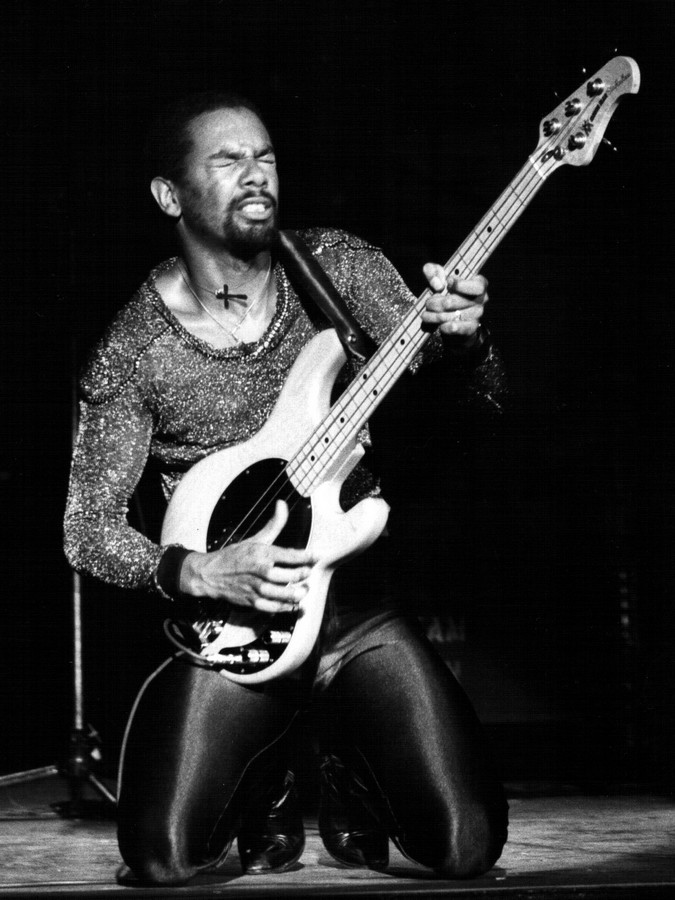
- Johnson with his Music Man StingRay, 1980

Background information
- Born: April 13, 1955; Los Angeles, California, U.S.
- Died: May 21, 2015 (aged 60) Las Vegas, Nevada
- Genres: R&B; funk; soul; jazz
- Occupations: Musician; record producer
- Instruments: Vocals; bass guitar; double bass; bass synthesizer
- Years active: 1973–2015
- Labels: A&M; Capitol; Star Licks Productions; Hal Leonard Publishing

Louis Johnson (April 13, 1955 – May 21, 2015) was an American bass guitarist. Johnson was best known for his work with the group the Brothers Johnson and his session playing on several hit albums of the 1970s and 1980s, including the best-selling album of all time, Michael Jackson's Thriller.

His signature sound came from the Music Man StingRay bass guitar, which Leo Fender made for him, and from his slapping technique. He is ranked number 38 on Bass Player magazine's list of "the 100 Greatest Bass Players of All Time".

== Biography ==
His work appears on many well-known records by prominent artists. Johnson played on Michael Jackson's albums Off the Wall, Thriller and Dangerous, and hit songs "Billie Jean" and "Don't Stop 'Til You Get Enough". He also played on George Benson's Give Me the Night. He was one of three bassists on Herb Alpert's 1979 album Rise, which included its top-10, Grammy-winning disco/jazz title track. Due to his distinctive style, Johnson was nicknamed "Thunder-Thumbs". His slap bass playing arrived soon after Larry Graham brought it into the mainstream, and both are considered the "grandfathers" of slap-bass playing.

His slap bass lines figure prominently in his work with Stanley Clarke on the Time Exposure album, his work with Grover Washington, Jr. (Hydra), George Duke (Guardian of the Light, Thief in the Night), Jeffrey Osborne (Jeffrey Osborne, and Stay with Me Tonight). The bass line for Michael McDonald's "I Keep Forgettin' (Every Time You're Near)" has been sampled as a backing track for dozens of rap songs. An example of his thumb playing can be heard on the Earl Klugh song "Kiko". Without any plucking at all, Johnson sets a complicated funky bass line using a combination of counterpoint slapping with right hand using right thumb, counterpoint with left hand middle finger as a mute technique, called a slap choke, thus creating a percussive sound like drums, adding to the bass notes. His style incorporated more funk plucks in combination with his thumping, which along with the Music Man StingRay sound gives a very funky, unique sound. He was the bassist on Earl Klugh's 1976 jazz/pop album Living inside Your Love and 1977 jazz/pop album Finger Paintings, as well as Quincy Jones' 1975 Mellow Madness.

Johnson also worked with Andrae Crouch, Angela Bofill, Aretha Franklin, Billy Preston, Bill Withers, Björk, Dave Grusin, David Diggs, Deniece Williams, Donna Summer, Donn Thomas, Gábor Szabó, Herbie Hancock, Hiroshima, Irene Cara, the Jacksons, James Ingram, Karen Carpenter, Kent Jordan, Kenny Loggins, Leon Haywood, Lesley Gore, Makoto Izumitani, Natalie Cole, Paul McCartney, Peabo Bryson, Peggy Lee, Phil Collins, Pointer Sisters, Rene & Angela, the Ritz, Rufus, Sérgio Mendes, Side Effect, Sister Sledge, Stevie Nicks, Stevie Wonder, Sweet Comfort Band, Temptations, Toshiki Kadomatsu and The Supremes.

== Death ==
Louis Johnson died on May 21, 2015, at the age of 60. The cause of death was esophageal bleeding.

== Solo releases ==
| Year | Title | Format | Label | Additional info |
|---|---|---|---|---|
| 1981 | Passage | Album | A&M | Gospel-directed album by this group, including Louis Johnson, Valerie Johnson (ex-wife) & former Brothers Johnson-percussionist/vocalist Richard Heath |
| 1985 | "Kinky"/"She's Bad" | Single | Capitol | Europe-exclusive solo release by Louis Johnson; Co-written by Tony Haynes |
| 1985 | Evolution | Album | Capitol | Europe-exclusive solo release by Louis Johnson |
| 1985 | Star Licks Master Sessions | VHS Video | Star Licks Productions | Louis Johnson instructional video re-issued on DVD by the Hal Leonard Company |

== Collaborations ==
With Aretha Franklin

- Aretha (Arista Records, 1980)
- Love All the Hurt Away (Arista Records, 1981)
- Jump to It (Arista Records, 1982)
- Who's Zoomin' Who? (Arista Records, 1985)
- Through the Storm (Arista Records, 1989)

With Barbra Streisand

- Till I Loved You (CBS Records, 1988)

With Betty Wright

- Wright Back At You (Epic Records, 1983)

With Bill Withers

- Making Music (Columbia Records, 1975)

With Billy Preston

- Music Is My Life (A&M Records, 1972)
- Pressin' On (Motown, 1982)

With Bobby Womack

- Making Music (Columbia Records, 1975)

With Deniece Williams

- I'm So Proud (Columbia Records, 1983)

With Donna Summer

- Donna Summer (Geffen, 1982)

With Earl Klugh

- Low Ride (Capitol, 1982)

With George Benson

- Give Me the Night (Warner Bros. Records, 1980)

With Grover Washington Jr.

- Feels So Good ((CTI/Kudu 1975))

With Irene Cara

- Carasmatic (Elektra Records, 1987)

With Jeffrey Osborne

- Jeffrey Osborne (A&M Records, 1982)
- Stay with Me Tonight (A&M Records, 1983)
- Don't Stop (A&M Records, 1984)

With John Mellencamp

- Uh-huh (Riva Records, 1983)

With Michael McDonald

- If That's What It Takes (Warner Bros. Records, 1982)

With Michael Jackson

- Off the Wall (Epic Records, 1979)
- Thriller (Epic Records, 1982)
- Dangerous (Epic Records, 1991)

With Patti Austin

- Every Home Should Have One (Qwest Records, 1981)

With Peabo Bryson

- Straight from the Heart (Elektra Records, 1984)

With Pointer Sisters

- having a party (abc, 1977)

With Quincy Jones

- Mellow Madness (A&M, 1975)
- The Dude (A&M, 1981)

With Rene & Angela

- Dto (Capitol, 1980)
- Rise (Capitol, 1983)

With Rufus

- Party 'Til You're Broke (MCA, 1981)

With Wah Wah Watson

- Elementary (Sony/CBS, 1976)
