= Grammy Award for Best Male R&B Vocal Performance =

Grammy award conferred between 1967 and 2011

The Grammy Award for Best Male R&B Vocal Performance was awarded between 1968 and 2011. The award has had several minor name changes:

- In 1968 it was awarded as Best R&B Solo Vocal Performance, Male
- From 1969 to 1994 it was awarded as Best R&B Vocal Performance, Male
- From 1995 to 2011 it was awarded as Best Male R&B Vocal Performance

The award category was discontinued in 2012 as part of a major overhaul of the Grammy categories. It was merged with Best Female R&B Vocal Performance and Best R&B Performance by a Duo or Group with Vocals into a single category for Best R&B Performance.

Years reflect the year in which the Grammy Awards were presented, for works released in the previous year.

== Recipients ==
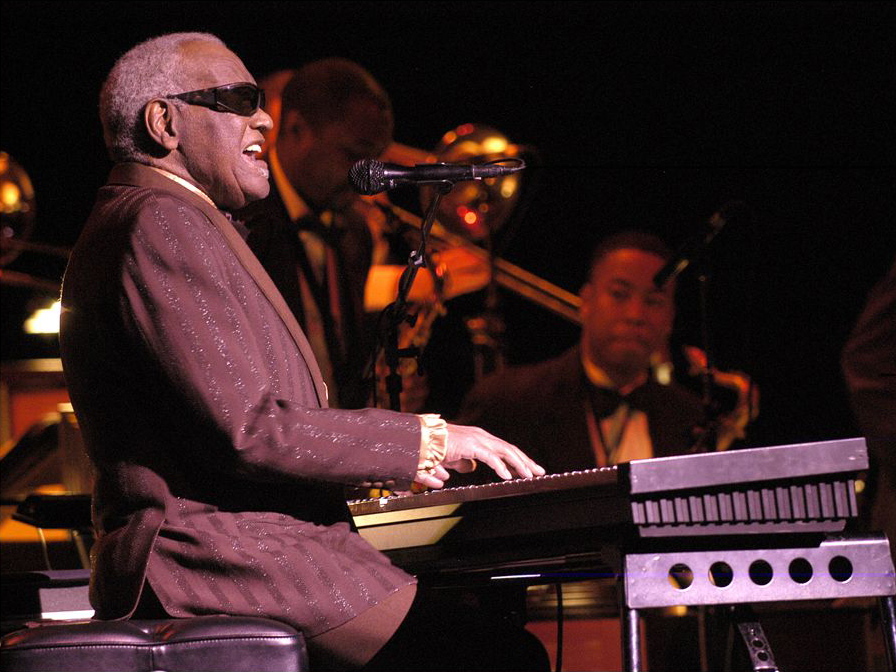
Ray Charles was the first recipient of the award. He won the award three times.

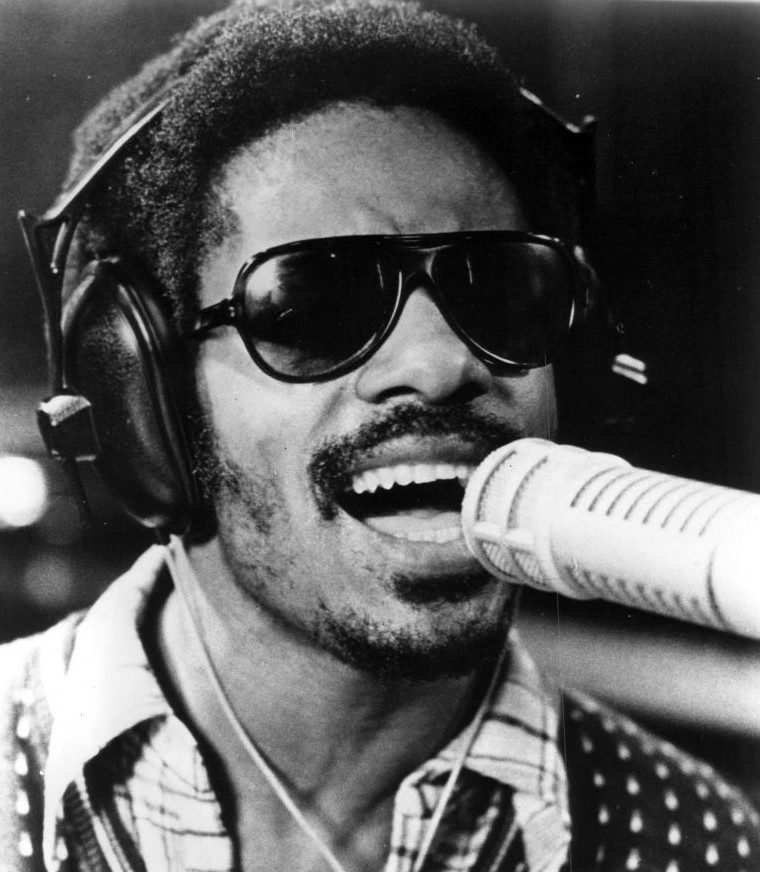
Stevie Wonder has most nominations in this category, with 16 nominations. He also has the most wins with seven.

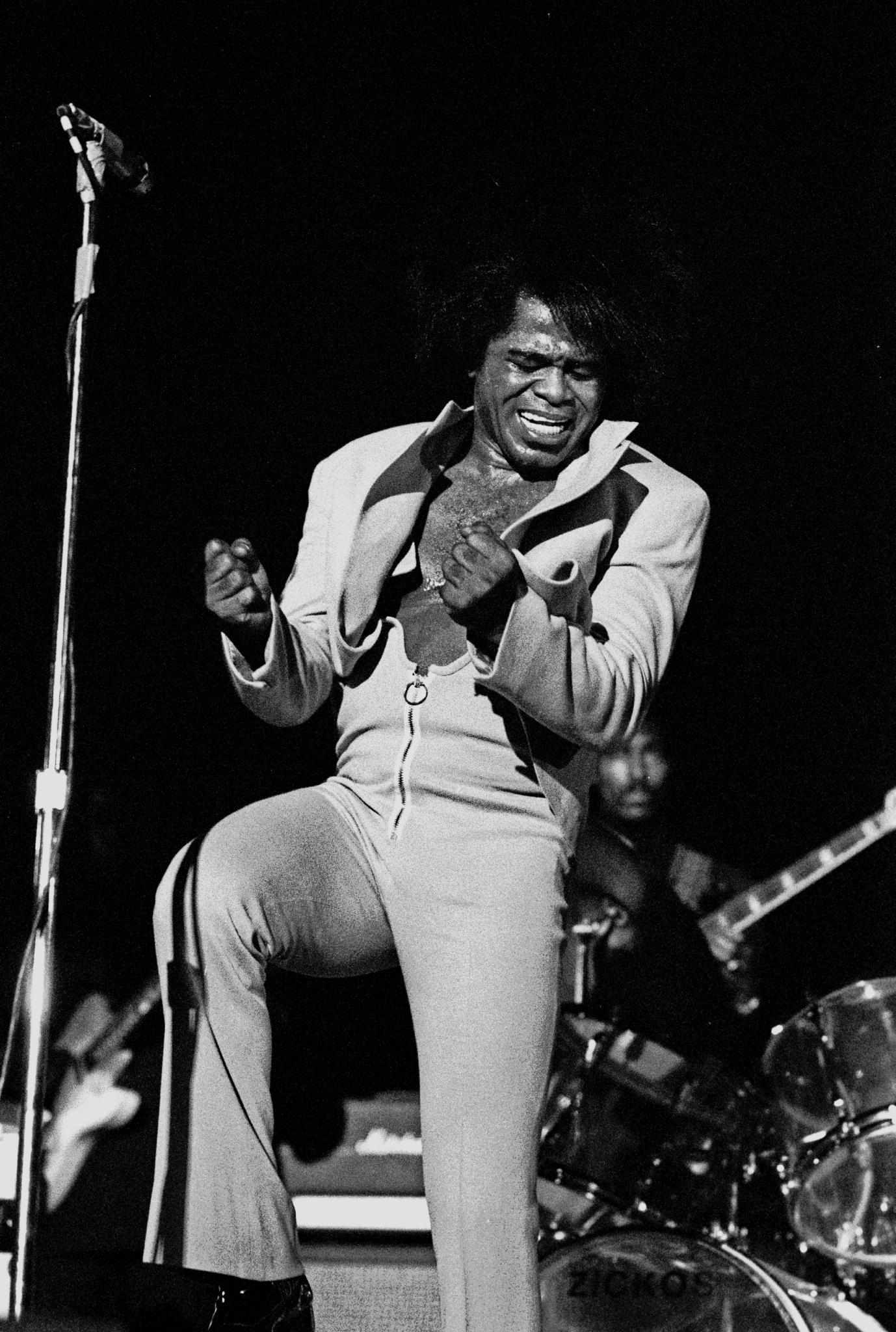
Singer James Brown won the award in 1987.

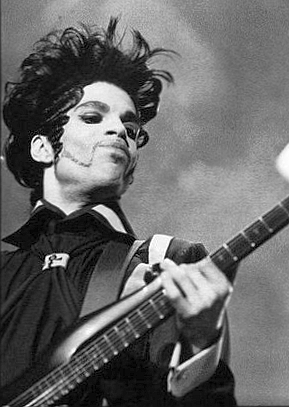
Artist Prince won the award two times.

Eight time nominee Usher won the award three times. He was the last winner in this category.

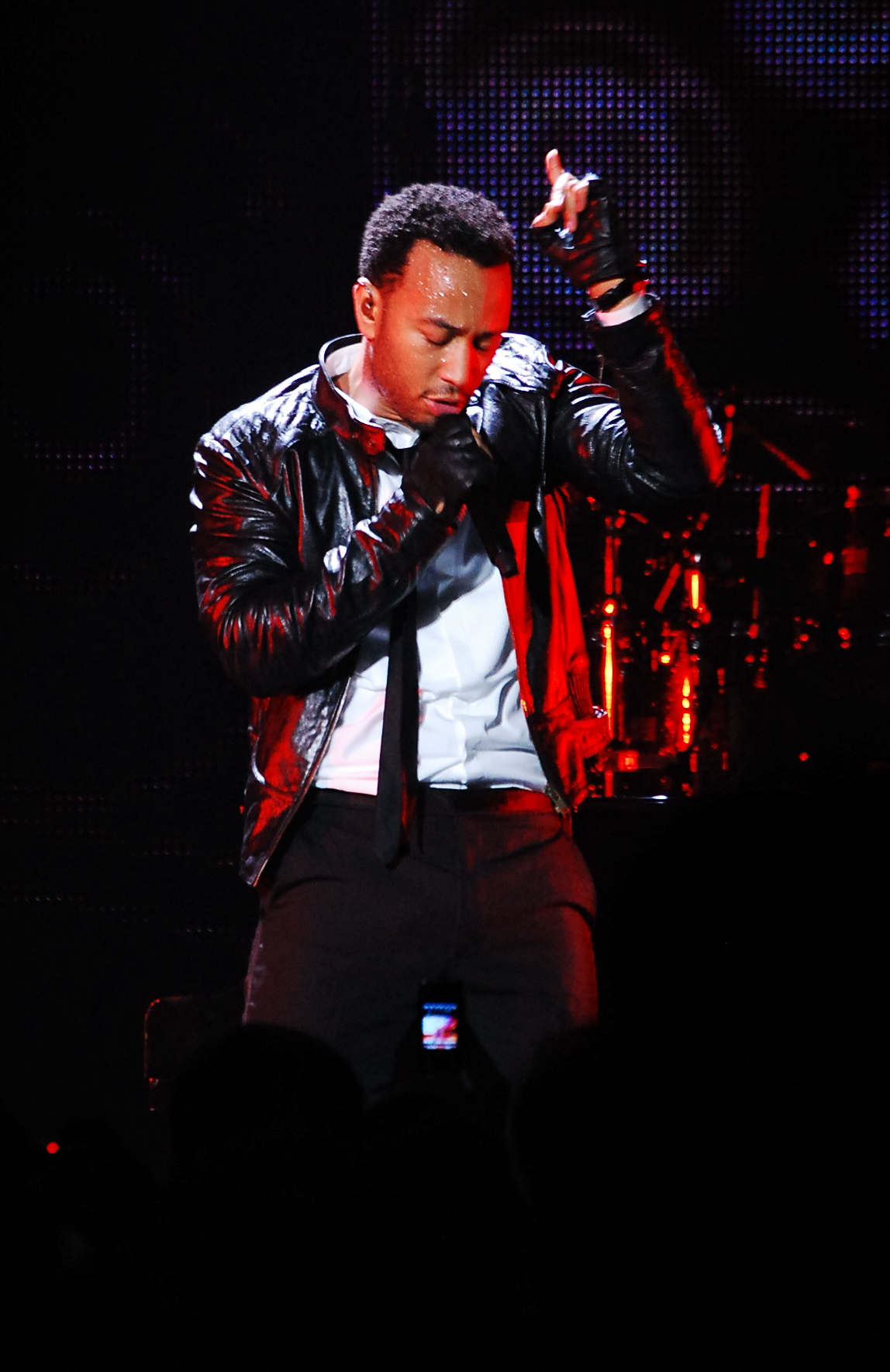
Two time winner John Legend.

Year^{[I]}	Winner(s)	Performance	Nominees	Ref.
1967	Ray Charles	"Crying Time"	"It's A Man's Man's Man's World" – James Brown; "Love Is a Hurtin' Thing" – Lou Rawls; "Uptight (Everything's Alright)" – Stevie Wonder; "When a Man Loves a Woman" – Percy Sledge	
1968	Lou Rawls	"Dead End Street"	"Funky Broadway" – Wilson Pickett; "Higher and Higher" – Jackie Wilson; "Skinny Legs and All" – Joe Tex; "Try A Little Tenderness" – Otis Redding	
1969	Otis Redding	"(Sittin' on) the Dock of the Bay"	"For Once in My Life" – Stevie Wonder; "(You Keep Me) Hangin' On" – Joe Simon; "I Heard It through the Grapevine" – Marvin Gaye; "Who's Making Love" – Johnnie Taylor	
1970	Joe Simon	"The Chokin' Kind"	Doing His Thing – Ray Charles; The Ice Man Cometh – Jerry Butler; Live & Well – B.B. King; "Your Good Thing (Is About to End)" – Lou Rawls	
1971	B.B. King	"The Thrill Is Gone"	"Get Me Back On Time, Engine Number 9" – Wilson Pickett; "Patches" – Clarence Carter; "Signed, Sealed, Delivered I'm Yours" – Stevie Wonder; "War" – Edwin Starr	
1972	Lou Rawls	"A Natural Man"	"Ain't Nobody Home" – B.B. King; Inner City Blues (Make Me Wanna Holler) – Marvin Gaye; Never Can Say Goodbye – Isaac Hayes; We Can Work It Out – Stevie Wonder	
1973	Billy Paul	"Me and Mrs. Jones"	"Drowning in the Sea of Love" – Joe Simon; "Freddie's Dead" – Curtis Mayfield; "I Gotcha" – Joe Tex; "Look What They've Done to My Song, Ma" – Ray Charles	
1974	Stevie Wonder	"Superstition"	"Call Me (Come Back Home)" – Al Green; "I'm Gonna Love You Just a Little More Baby" – Barry White; "Keep on Truckin'" – Eddie Kendricks; "Let's Get It On" – Marvin Gaye	
1975	Stevie Wonder	"Boogie on Reggae Woman"	"Boogie Down" – Eddie Kendricks; "Hang on in There Baby" – Johnny Bristol; Marvin Gaye Live! – Marvin Gaye; "Rock Your Baby" – George McCrae	
1976	Stevie Wonder	"Living for the City"	Chocolate Chip – Isaac Hayes; "L.O.V.E." – Al Green; "Love Won't Let Me Wait" – Major Harris; "Supernatural Thing, Part I" – Ben E. King	
1977	Stevie Wonder	"I Wish"	"Disco Lady" – Johnnie Taylor; "Groovy People" – Lou Rawls; "I Need You, You Need Me" – Joe Simon; "I Want You" – Marvin Gaye; "Lowdown" – Boz Scaggs	
1978	Lou Rawls	Unmistakably Lou	"A Real Mother For Ya" – Johnny "Guitar" Watson; "Ain't Gonna Bump No More (With No Big Fat Woman)" – Joe Tex; "Got To Give It Up (Part 1)" – Marvin Gaye; "It's Just a Matter of Time" – B.B. King	
1979	George Benson	"On Broadway"	"Close the Door" – Teddy Pendergrass; "Dance with Me" – Peter Brown; "I Can See Clearly Now" – Ray Charles; "When You Hear Lou, You've Heard It All" – Lou Rawls	
1980	Michael Jackson	"Don't Stop 'Til You Get Enough"	"Cruisin'" – Smokey Robinson; "Don't Let Go" – Isaac Hayes; "Love Ballad" – George Benson; "Mama Can't Buy You Love" – Elton John; "Some Enchanted Evening" – Ray Charles	
1981	George Benson	Give Me the Night	"Let's Get Serious" – Jermaine Jackson; "Master Blaster (Jammin')" – Stevie Wonder; "Never Givin' Up" – Al Jarreau; One in a Million You – Larry Graham	
1982	James Ingram	"One Hundred Ways"	"I Can't Live Without Your Love" – Teddy Pendergrass; Never Too Much – Luther Vandross; "She's a Bad Mama Jama (She's Built, She's Stacked)" – Carl Carlton; Street Songs – Rick James	
1983	Marvin Gaye	"Sexual Healing"	"Do I Do" – Stevie Wonder; Forever, For Always, For Love – Luther Vandross; "The Other Woman" – Ray Parker Jr.; "Turn Your Love Around" – George Benson	
1984	Michael Jackson	"Billie Jean"	"International Lover" – Prince; Midnight Love – Marvin Gaye; "Party Animal" – James Ingram; Stay With Me Tonight – Jeffrey Osborne	
1985	Billy Ocean	"Caribbean Queen (No More Love on the Run)"	Don't Stop – Jeffrey Osborne; In the Name of Love – Bill Withers; It's Your Night – James Ingram; "The Woman In Red" – Stevie Wonder	
1986	Stevie Wonder	In Square Circle	Chinese Wall – Philip Bailey; High Crime – Al Jarreau; The Night I Fell in Love – Luther Vandross; "You Are My Lady" – Freddie Jackson	
1987	James Brown	"Living in America"	"Give Me The Reason" – Luther Vandross; Love Zone – Billy Ocean; "The Rain" – Oran "Juice" Jones; "Since I Fell for You" – Al Jarreau	
1988	Smokey Robinson	"Just to See Her"	"Bad" – Michael Jackson; "In The Midnight Hour" – Wilson Pickett; "Lies" – Jonathan Butler; "Skeletons" – Stevie Wonder	
1989	Terence Trent D'Arby	Introducing the Hardline According to Terence Trent D'Arby	Any Love – Luther Vandross; Characters – Stevie Wonder; Joy – Teddy Pendergrass; "Nite and Day" – Al B. Sure!	
1990	Bobby Brown	"Every Little Step"	Heart's Horizon – Al Jarreau; "Batdance" – Prince; "We've Saved the Best for Last" – Smokey Robinson; "She Won't Talk to Me" – Luther Vandross	
1991	Luther Vandross	"Here and Now"	"Misunderstanding" – Al B. Sure!; "Whip Appeal" – Babyface; "Round and Round" – Tevin Campbell; Johnny Gill – Johnny Gill	
1992	Luther Vandross	"Power of Love/Love Power"	Love Over-Due – James Brown; "Can You Stop the Rain" – Peabo Bryson; "How Can You Mend A Broken Heart?" – Teddy Pendergrass; "Kissing You" – Keith Washington; "Gotta Have You" – Stevie Wonder	
1993	Al Jarreau	Heaven and Earth	"Humpin' Around" – Bobby Brown; "Lost in the Night" – Peabo Bryson; T.E.V.I.N. – Tevin Campbell; "Jam" – Michael Jackson	
1994	Ray Charles	"A Song for You"	"For the Cool in You" – Babyface; "Can We Talk" – Tevin Campbell; "Voodoo" – Teddy Pendergrass; "How Deep Is Your Love" – Luther Vandross	
1995	Babyface	"When Can I See You"	"I'm Ready" – Tevin Campbell; "Wait for the Magic" – Al Jarreau; "Always and Forever" – Luther Vandross; "Practice What You Preach" – Barry White	
1996	Stevie Wonder	"For Your Love"	"Brown Sugar" – D'Angelo; "This Is How We Do It" – Montell Jordan; "I Hate U" – Prince; "Baby's Home" – Barry White	
1997	Luther Vandross	"Your Secret Love"	"Lady" – D'Angelo; "A Change Is Gonna Come" – Al Green; "New World Order" – Curtis Mayfield; "Like a Woman" – Tony Rich Project	
1998	R. Kelly	"I Believe I Can Fly"	"For You" – Kenny Lattimore; "Back To Living Again" – Curtis Mayfield; "You Make Me Wanna..." – Usher; "When You Call On Me / Baby That's When I Come Runnin'" – Luther Vandross	
1999	Stevie Wonder	"St. Louis Blues"	"Maybe You" – Maxwell; "The Only One for Me" – Brian McKnight; "My Way" – Usher; "I Know" – Luther Vandross	
2000	Barry White	"Staying Power"	"Did You Ever Know" – Peabo Bryson; "Fortunate" – Maxwell; "Sweet Lady" – Tyrese; "When A Woman's Fed Up" – R. Kelly	
2001	D'Angelo	"Untitled (How Does It Feel)"	"I Wanna Know" – Joe; "I Wish" – R. Kelly; "Stay or Let It Go" – Brian McKnight; "Thong Song" – Sisqo	
2002	Usher	"U Remind Me"	"Lifetime" – Maxwell; "Love" – Musiq Soulchild; "Love of My Life" – Brian McKnight; "Missing You" – Case	
2003	Usher	"U Don't Have to Call"	"Halfcrazy" – Musiq Soulchild; "Let's Stay Home Tonight" – Joe; "Take a Message" – Remy Shand; "The World's Greatest" – R. Kelly	
2004	Luther Vandross	"Dance with My Father"	"How You Gonna Act Like That" – Tyrese; "Shoulda, Woulda, Coulda" – Brian McKnight; "Step in the Name of Love" – R. Kelly; "Superstar" – Ruben Studdard	
2005	Prince	"Call My Name"	"Burn" – Usher; "Charlene" – Anthony Hamilton; "Happy People" – R. Kelly; "What We Do Here" – Brian McKnight	
2006	John Legend	"Ordinary People"	"Creepin'" – Jamie Foxx; "Let Me Love You" – Mario; "So What the Fuss" – Stevie Wonder; "Superstar" – Usher	
2007	John Legend	"Heaven"	"Black Sweat" – Prince; "Got You Home" – Luther Vandross; "I Call It Love" – Lionel Richie; "So Sick" – Ne-Yo	
2008	Prince	"Future Baby Mama"	"Because of You" – Ne-Yo; "B.U.D.D.Y." – Musiq Soulchild; "Please Don't Go" – Tank; "Woman" – Raheem DeVaughn	
2009	Ne-Yo	"Miss Independent"	"Can't Help but Wait" – Trey Songz; "Here I Stand" – Usher; "Take You Down" – Chris Brown; "You're the Only One" – Eric Benét	
2010	Maxwell	"Pretty Wings"	"The Point Of It All" – Anthony Hamilton; "SoBeautiful" – Musiq Soulchild; "There Goes My Baby" – Charlie Wilson; "Under" – Pleasure P	
2011	Usher	"There Goes My Baby"	"Finding My Way Back" – Jaheim; "Second Chance" – El DeBarge; "We're Still Friends" – Musiq Soulchild; "Why Would You Stay" – Kem	

== Category records ==
Most wins

Rank	1st	2nd	3rd
Artist	Stevie Wonder	Luther Vandross	Lou Rawls; Ray Charles; Usher
Total wins	7 Wins	4 wins	3 wins

Most nominations

Rank	1st	2nd	3rd
Artist	Stevie Wonder	Luther Vandross	Marvin Gaye; Usher
Total nominations	16 nominations	15 nominations	8 nominations
