= A Fantasy Love Affair =

Studio album by Peter Brown
- Released: 1978
- Recorded: 1976–77
- Studio: Studio Center Sound Recordings, Inc., Miami, Florida
- Genre: R&B
- Length: 36:57
- Label: Drive Records
- Producer: Cory Wade

Peter Brown chronology
| A Fantasy Love Affair (1978) | Stargazer (1979) |

Singles from A Fantasy Love Affair
- 1. "Do You Wanna Get Funky With Me"; 2. "You Should Do It"; 3. "Dance With Me"; 4. "Fantasy Love Affair / It's True What They Say About Love"

Professional ratings
Review scores
| Source | Rating |
|---|---|
| AllMusic | link |

A Fantasy Love Affair is the debut album by Peter Brown. The album was recorded in 1976–77 and released in 1978. It was mastered by Ted Jensen of Sterling Sound. It charted #9 on Billboard's R&B charts and #11 on the Pop chart. It was successful on the disco charts as well and spawned four singles, three of which were hits, including "Do Ya Wanna Get Funky with Me" and "Dance with Me". In the UK the album was titled Do You Wanna Get Funky with Me and featured a backlit silhouette of a nude woman standing in a window as its sleeve cover. Brown also photographed the album's somewhat controversial cover and revealed, in a 1978 interview in Rolling Stone, that he had created the cover's nude model out of cardboard, sheer fabric and ribbons. Until then, no one ever suspected it was not a real person. The album peaked at number 50 in Australia.

The album was later reissued on Collectables Records.

== Track listing ==
Songns composed by Peter Brown, additional writers where noted.

| No. | Title | Writer(s) | Length |
|---|---|---|---|
| 1. | "A Fantasy Love Affair" | | 3:55 |
| 2. | "Do Ya Wanna Get Funky with Me" | Robert Rans | 9:06 |
| 3. | "You Should Do It" | Rans | 3:49 |
| 4. | "The Singer's Become a Dancer" | | 3:55 |
| 5. | "For Your Love" | Rans | 4:18 |
| 6. | "Dance with Me" | Rans | 5:18 |
| 7. | "It's True What They Say About Love" | Rans | 3:41 |
| 8. | "Without Love" | | 3:14 |

== Personnel ==
- Peter Brown - lead vocals, synthesizer, guitar, piano, electric piano, drums, percussion, timbales, arrangements
- Tom Dziallo - guitar, bass guitar
- Steve Gordon - guitar
- Paul Ricupero - guitar, backing vocals
- Robert Rans - piano
- Michael Smith - alto saxophone
- Valerie Von Pechy - harp
- Wildflower, Betty Wright, Pat Hurley - backing vocals
- Bert Dovo - string and horn arrangements, conductor
- Gene Orloff - concertmaster
