= Material Girl =

1985 single by Madonna

- Artwork used for most international releases

Single by Madonna

from the album Like a Virgin
- B-side: "Pretender"
- Released: January 23, 1985
- Recorded: 1984
- Studio: Power Station (New York City)
- Genre: Synth-pop; new wave
- Length: 4:01
- Label: Sire; Warner Bros.
- Songwriters: Peter Brown; Robert Rans
- Producer: Nile Rodgers

Madonna singles chronology
"Like a Virgin" (1984)	"Material Girl" (1985)	"Crazy for You" (1985)

Music video
- "Material Girl" on YouTube

"Material Girl" is a song by American singer Madonna from her second studio album, Like a Virgin (1984). Written by Peter Brown and Robert Rans and produced by Nile Rodgers, it was released as the album's second single on January 23, 1985. Brown conceived the song while driving and subsequently completed it with Rans; Madonna selected it for the album after being attracted to its ironic concept and wordplay. A synth-pop song with new wave, disco and reggae influences, "Material Girl" features prominent synthesizers and robotic male backing vocals. Madonna portrays a woman who demands financial security in her romantic partners, a premise that has been interpreted both as a satire of 1980s consumerism and as an assertion of female agency and control.

Contemporary reviews of "Material Girl" were mostly positive, although Madonna's distinctive vocal delivery divided some critics; retrospective commentary has generally praised its production, melody and humor. The song peaked at number two on the US Billboard Hot 100 and reached number one on the Hot Dance Club Songs and Cash Box charts. Internationally, it reached the top ten in Australia, Canada, New Zealand, the United Kingdom and several European countries. The accompanying music video, directed by Mary Lambert, recreates Marilyn Monroe's performance of "Diamonds Are a Girl's Best Friend" in Gentlemen Prefer Blondes (1953), with Madonna wearing a pink gown and performing among tuxedoed male dancers. A parallel storyline deliberately complicates the song's materialistic image by portraying her character as more interested in romance than wealth. Critics and scholars have interpreted this duality as both a parody and reinterpretation of Monroe's image, and as allowing Madonna to simultaneously embrace and subvert conventional representations of femininity, sexuality and materialism.

Madonna has performed "Material Girl" on five of her concert tours, the last being the Rebel Heart Tour (2015―2016). It as also been widely covered, parodied and used in popular culture. Retrospectively, commentators have identified it as emblematic of the consumerism, excess and yuppie culture associated with the 1980s, and it became so closely identified with Madonna that "Material Girl" developed into an enduring nickname for the singer, despite her ambivalence toward it. In 2022, she revisited the concept by collaborating with American rapper Saucy Santana on "Material Gworrllllllll!", a remix of his 2019 song "Material Girl", which had itself been inspired by Madonna's original. The collaboration followed the viral popularity of Santana's song on TikTok and coincided with Madonna's efforts to introduce her earlier music to a new generation.

== Background and release ==
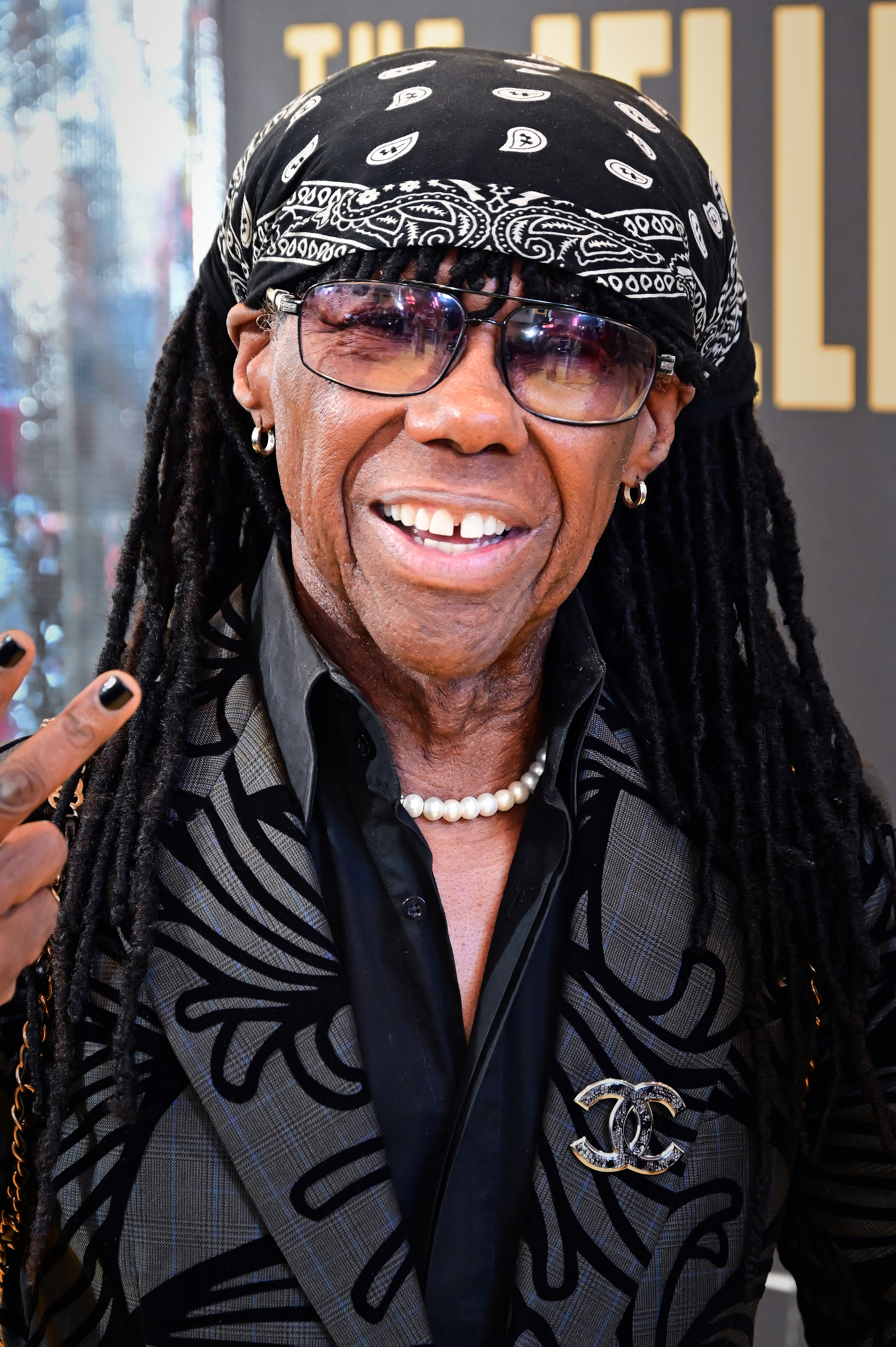
Nile Rodgers (pictured in 2026) produced "Material Girl".

"Material Girl" was written by Peter Brown and Robert Rans. Brown had previously achieved success as a recording artist during the disco era and had frequently collaborated with Rans on lyrics. In 1984, John "Jellybean" Benitez remixed Brown's single "They Only Come Out at Night" in New York. Following the session, Brown joined Benitez, Madonna and Freddy DeMann—who managed both Brown and Madonna—for dinner, followed by a Michael Jackson concert and an after-party. Shortly afterward, DeMann and his business partner Ron Weisner asked Brown to write a song for Madonna.

Brown and Rans spent about a week unsuccessfully developing material before Brown conceived "Material Girl" while driving. He later recalled hearing the song in his head "like a finished record", complete with its music and portions of the lyrics, and repeatedly sang it to himself until he returned home, where he immediately recorded the idea. Brown then completed the lyrics with Rans and recorded a demo featuring vocals by Pat Hurley. Warner Bros. A&R executive Michael Ostin later presented Madonna with the demos of "Material Girl" and "Like a Virgin", two outside compositions he felt would complement Madonna's own material for her second studio album. Madonna recalled being drawn to both songs because she found them "ironic and provocative" and unlike her own personality, describing their concepts and wordplay as clever.

Produced by Nile Rodgers, recording sessions took place in April 1984 at the Power Station studios in New York City. Rodgers sought a tougher, more "streetwise" sound than Madonna's previous dance-pop recordings, assembling a rhythm section with himself on guitar, his Chic bandmate Bernard Edwards on bass, and former Chic drummer Tony Thompson on drums. Rodgers considered "Material Girl" the strongest candidate for the album's lead single, recalling that he believed it was "ten times better" than "Like a Virgin"; Madonna, however, favored the latter. "Material Girl" was released as the second single from the Like a Virgin album on January 23, 1985. Afterwards, it was included on Madonna's compilation albums The Immaculate Collection (1990), Celebration (2009), and Finally Enough Love: 50 Number Ones (2022).

== Composition and lyrical interpretation ==
"Material Girl" (1984)
Audio sample of "Material Girl", featuring the refrain and its use of financial language in the lyric "boys that save their pennies make my rainy day".

Musically, "Material Girl" has been described as synth-pop by Billboard and Entertainment Weekly, while The A.V. Club characterized it as a "slick new wave disco" song. Stephen Holden from The New York Times additionally noted elements of reggae in its pop arrangement. The production is driven by synthesizer figures and a strong backbeat, with the Simms Brothers providing deadpan, robotic backing vocals that repeatedly chant the hook "living in a material world". According to Santiago Fouz-Hernández and Freya Jarman-Ivens, Madonna begins the song in the "little-girl" voice associated with her earlier work, before shifting after the first verse to a "richer, more mature sound" for the refrain, accompanied by a denser instrumental texture. Rooksby similarly noted her deliberately high register, which he compared to Cyndi Lauper's vocal style.

Lyrically, "Material Girl" presents romance in explicitly economic terms, with Madonna's character judging prospective partners by their wealth and what they can provide. The character is established in the opening lines—"Some boys kiss me, some boys hug me / I think they're OK"—before dismissing those who fail to give her "proper credit"; later, she declares that "the boy with the cold hard cash is always Mister Right". The premise is encapsulated in the refrain, in which she declares, "We are living in a material world / And I am a material girl". Holden described the song as an "'80s teen-pop version" of "Diamonds Are a Girl's Best Friend" (1949), noting its use of financial language such as "interest" and "saving pennies", while Christopher P. Andersen described the song as a tongue-in-cheek tribute to 1980s materialism and the "time-honored profession" of the gold digger. Rooksby similarly interpreted the lyrics as presenting relationships as commodities and likened the character's approach to romance to trading stocks and shares; he also identified a lyrical connection to the Miracles' "Shop Around" (1960).

Interpretations have also focused on the narrator's relationship with men. Music scholar Robert Matthew-Walker characterized them as little more than "meal-tickets" or playthings for her. Fouz-Hernández and Jarman-Ivens, however, emphasized the narrator's control, arguing that the vocal arrangement places Madonna at the center of the song's discourse. They pointed particularly to the coda, in which the male voice chants "living in a material world" in a low monotone while she adds her own commentary, and viewed this dynamic as an inversion of the misogynistic imagery found in many songs of the period. The authors contrasted it with Robert Palmer's "Addicted to Love" (1986) video, in which female models appear as an anonymous backing band. Discussing the song in 1986, Madonna related its themes to her own career-driven outlook, saying that she was attracted to similarly ambitious men and associated material possessions with security: "that's what pays the rents and buys you furs". She added that such security "lasts longer than emotions".

== Critical reception ==
Contemporary reviews of "Material Girl" were mostly positive, with several critics focusing on Madonna's vocal delivery. Susan Parker of The Macon Telegraph described it as a "cute, catchy, Eartha Kitt-like song", while Rick Shefchik of the Jacksonville Daily News felt that Madonna's high, "innocent" delivery contrasted with the "sex-goddess image" projected by "Like a Virgin". Debby Miller of Rolling Stone similarly noted the singer's "little-girl voice", but detected an "undercurrent of ambition that makes her more than the latest Betty Boop". Cash Box praised the song's danceable backbeat and sense of humor, noting that Madonna sounded less "squeaky" than on her previous recordings. In an unfavorable review, Russell Smith of The Dallas Morning News described her voice as "thin and thoroughly undistinguished" and the arrangement as "cleverly bouncy" but "sterile and passionless". The Chicago Tribune dismissed it as "mediocre".

Retrospective assessments have been more complimentary of both Madonna's performance and the song's production. Daryl Easlea characterized "Material Girl" as "jaunty, clashing, loud [and] remarkable", and felt that the "coyness and charm" of Madonna's vocals signaled a new approach for the singer. From People magazine, Drew Mackie highlighted the song's enduring catchiness, observing that hearing only a few lines was enough for it to "immediately [get] stuck in your head". Mayer Nissim of PinkNews described her delivery as "scratchy, smartass [...] dripping with wry cynicism", while Sebastián E. Alonso of Spanish website Jenesaispop praised its melody and recording as "10/10" and viewed Madonna's deliberately frivolous-sounding performance as deceptively clever. The production has received similar praise: NME's Larry Bartleet singled out what he called "one of the most iconic synth lines ever", while Chuck Arnold of Entertainment Weekly described the song as "'80s synth-pop nirvana". Rik Flynn of Classic Pop praised Rodgers's production, particularly its "cybernetic monotone refrain" and "truly immaculate bassline". In a later assessment for Billboard, however, Arnold was more reserved, suggesting that "Material Girl" "may not hold up as well" as some of Madonna's other singles from the time.

Critics have also interpreted the song's materialistic persona as deliberately humorous rather than literal. Author Matthew Rettenmund described it as a "broad send-up" of the gold digger archetype associated with Marilyn Monroe and an "affectionate" homage to an outdated female stereotype, while J. Randy Taraborrelli characterized its lyrics as semi-autobiographical, tongue-in-cheek and ironic. By his part, Ed Masley from The Arizona Republic rejected earlier criticism of the song as crass and materialistic, arguing that Madonna's performance and the robotic backing vocals made its satirical intent apparent. Rikky Rooksby similarly described "Material Girl" as a "pungent satire" of the ambitious culture associated with the Reagan era and Thatcher years, although he questioned whether its irony translated effectively through pop music.

== Chart performance ==
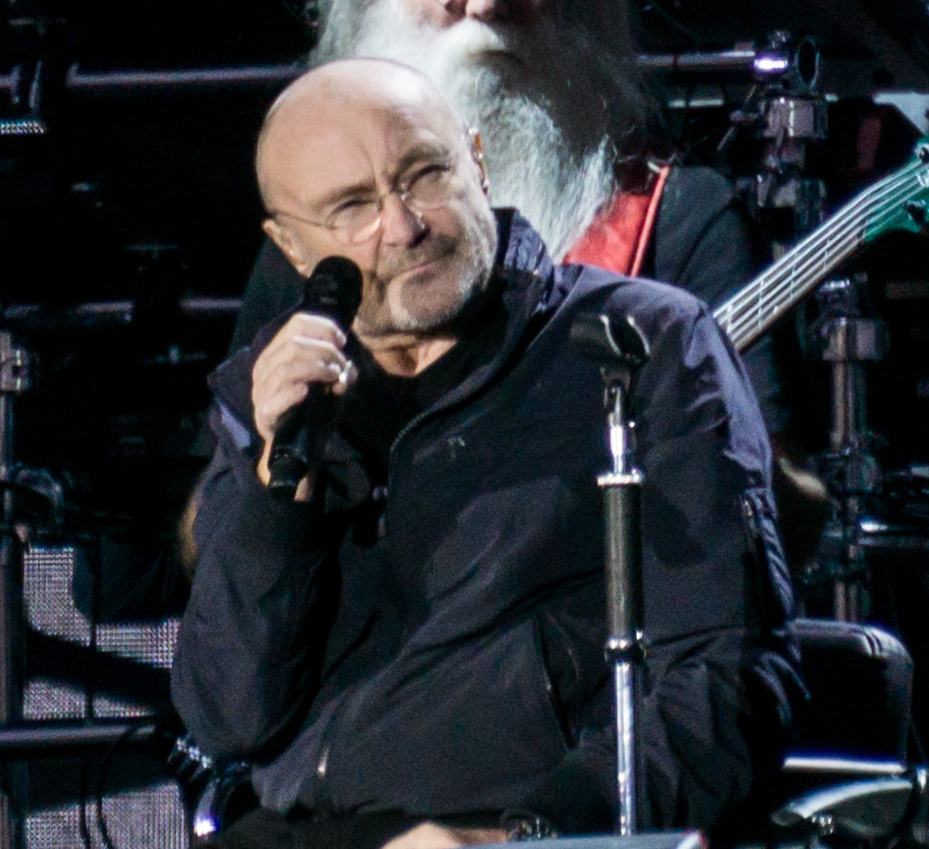
"Can't Fight This Feeling" by REO Speedwagon (left) and "One More Night" by Phil Collins (right) kept "Material Girl" from reaching the top of the Billboard Hot 100.

During the week of February 9, 1985, "Material Girl" was added to 91 reporting radio stations and debuted at number 43 on the Billboard Hot 100. One month later, it made the week's biggest move on the Hot 100, jumping 13 positions from number 18 to number five and becoming Madonna's third consecutive top-five single, following "Lucky Star" and "Like a Virgin". At the time, Cyndi Lauper was the only other female artist of the 1980s to have achieved at least three consecutive top-five hits. On March 23, "Material Girl" peaked at number two on the Hot 100, where it remained for two weeks; it was kept from the top position by REO Speedwagon's "Can't Fight This Feeling" and Phil Collins' "One More Night". As of August 2024, Billboard ranked "Material Girl" as Madonna's 15th most successful Hot 100 entry. The song also became Madonna's third number-one on Billboard's Hot Dance Club Songs chart. Additionally, it reached number 49 on the Hot R&B/Hip-Hop Songs. By year's end, "Material Girl" ranked number 58 on Billboard's Hot 100 and number 41 on its Dance Club Songs chart.

On the Cash Box Top 100 Pop Singles chart, "Material Girl" debuted at number 42 on February 9 and reached number one on March 30, 1985, becoming Madonna's second chart-topper after "Like a Virgin". In Canada, "Material Girl" debuted at number 76 on the RPM Singles Chart dated February 16, 1985. Seven weeks later, it peaked at number four and ultimately spent 22 weeks on the chart. The single was certified gold in Canada for sales of 50,000 copies and ranked number 46 on the RPM year-end chart for 1985. Elsewhere in the Americas, it reached number four in Argentina and number seven in Brazil.

In Australia, the single debuted at number 25 on March 17, 1985, and peaked at number four three weeks later. It also reached the top five in New Zealand. In the UK Singles Chart, "Material Girl" debuted at number 24 on March 2, 1985, and peaked at number three, spending ten weeks on the chart. In August 2023, it was certified platinum by the British Phonographic Industry (BPI) for sales and streams exceeding 600,000 units. According to the Official Charts Company, the song has sold over 385,000 copies in the country as of August 2017. Elsewhere in Europe, "Material Girl" reached the top ten in Austria, Belgium, Ireland, the Netherlands and Spain. It also reached the top ten on the European Hot 100 Singles, and the top 40 in Germany, Italy and Switzerland.

== Music video ==
=== Background and development ===
The music video for "Material Girl" was filmed at the Ren-Mar Studios on January 10 and 11, 1985, and directed by Mary Lambert, who had previously directed Madonna's videos for "Borderline" and "Like a Virgin". Madonna had initially intended to work with French artist Jean-Paul Goude, but didn't like his ideas for the song. Unlike with "Borderline", where she had sought to align Madonna's character with her off-screen personality, Lambert felt that the singer had since attained enough star power to portray any image she chose. She subsequently wrote and storyboarded her own treatment for "Material Girl" shortly before Christmas 1984.

Madonna, however, insisted on basing the video around Marilyn Monroe's performance of "Diamonds Are a Girl's Best Friend" in the 1953 film Gentlemen Prefer Blondes, which she described as her favorite scene from Monroe's films. Both Lambert and Madonna shared a fascination with Monroe, with the latter identifying with the intense public attention surrounding her sexuality and being particularly drawn to her vulnerability. Lambert consequently devised a new concept around the sequence, which was approved on New Year's Eve. To recreate the sequence, Lambert and choreographer Kenny Ortega repeatedly studied the original choreography, which Ortega reinterpreted for the video. Costume designer Marlene Stewart similarly recreated Monroe's pink dress, while jewelry was supplied by collector Connie Parente. With Madonna available for only two days of filming in January before traveling to Tokyo and Hawaii, pre-production was completed under a tight schedule. The video was produced by Simon Fields, with Peter Sinclair serving as cinematographer, and Glenn Morgan as editor.

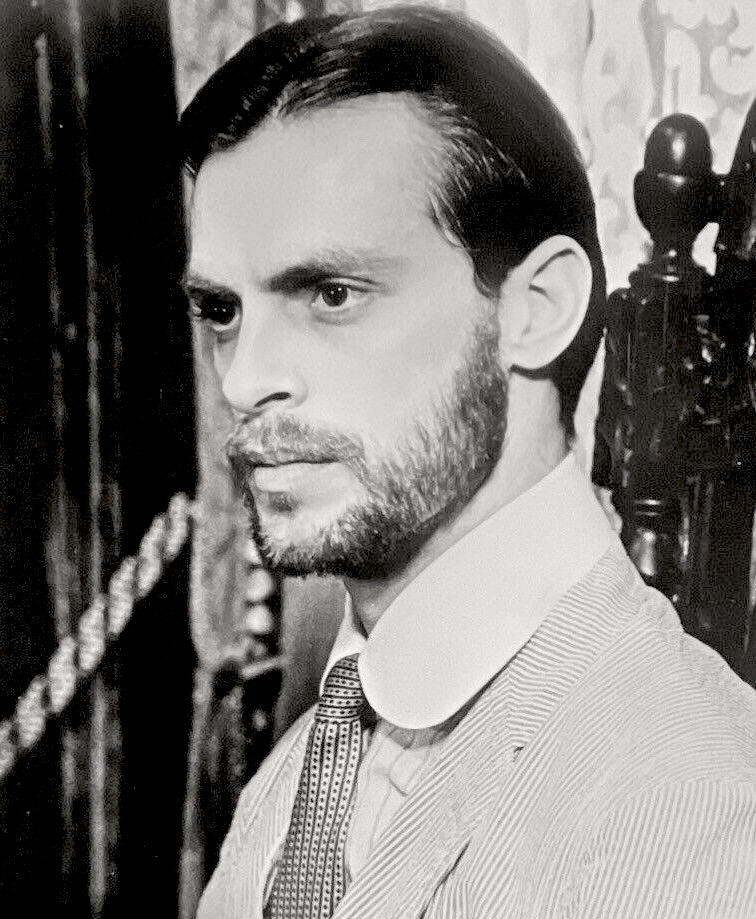
Actor Keith Carradine (pictured in the 1978 film Pretty Baby) plays Madonna's love interest in the video.

Actor Keith Carradine was cast at Madonna's request as a film director who becomes interested in her character. According to Carradine, the video's narrative was conceived around a "Howard Hughes and Marilyn Monroe" dynamic, with his character as the influential figure behind the scenes. He described Madonna as "delightful" during filming, although she told him that she disliked the song itself. Actor Robert Wuhl was cast in a smaller role. During the first day of filming, Madonna met actor Sean Penn, whom Lambert had brought to the set; the two subsequently began a relationship and married later that year.

=== Synopsis and release ===
The video opens with a film director (Carradine) and his associate George (Wuhl) watching footage of an actress (Madonna) performing. Impressed, the director predicts that she will become a star, prompting George to reply that she's already "the biggest star in the universe". The footage transitions into the performance itself, which recreates Monroe's "Diamonds Are a Girl's Best Friend" sequence. Wearing a strapless pink gown and styled with blonde curls, Madonna performs on a set featuring a staircase and chandeliers, surrounded by tuxedoed male dancers. As they shower her with money, jewelry and furs and carry her up the stairs, she playfully rebuffs their advances, at one point dismissing them with a fan.

Attracted to the actress, the director begins trying to impress her with expensive gifts, but changes his approach after overhearing a telephone conversation in which she says that money is not what she cares about. After consulting the studio directory to learn her name, he poses as penniless and arranges a date, bringing her flowers and obtaining an old pickup truck from an old man in exchange for a large sum of money. His deception succeeds, and the video ends with the couple kissing in the backseat of the truck. "Material Girl" was added to MTV during the week of February 9, 1985, and became one of the year's most frequently aired music videos in Europe. It was later included in Madonna's video compilations The Immaculate Collection (1990) and Celebration: The Video Collection (2009).

=== Analysis and reception ===
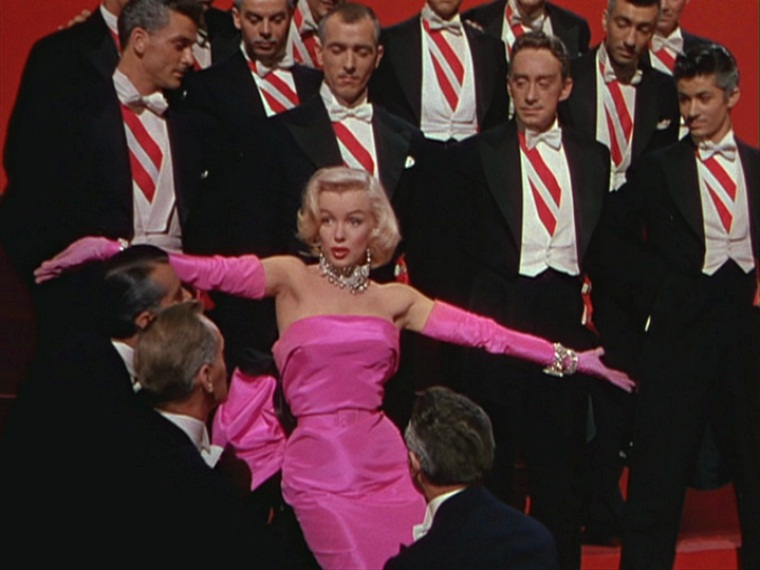
The "Material Girl" video (left) recreates Marilyn Monroe's performance of "Diamonds Are a Girl's Best Friend" in the 1953 film Gentlemen Prefer Blondes (right); critics have interpreted Madonna's version as both a parody and reinterpretation of Monroe's image.

Critics and scholars have frequently commented on the video's contrast between Madonna's materialistic stage character and the romantic storyline. Mary Gabriel praised her performance and described her as a "good girl–bad girl": a starlet seeking genuine love offstage while portraying a "manipulative materialist" during the musical number. In a similar vein, Mary Cross argued that such contradictions allow Madonna to appear simultaneously as a "Hollywood sex goddess", a "money-mad materialist" and a "girl-next-door". Adam Sexton also identified two competing narratives: the musical number presents the singer in Monroe's "sexy golddigger" role before the romantic storyline questions that image by portraying the "real" Madonna as someone who cannot be bought and who falls for Carradine's seemingly poor admirer. The staff of Slant Magazine viewed her materialism as a masquerade, describing the video as a postmodern deconstruction of femininity, sexuality and materialism that "set the stage for much of her career". Scholar Douglas Kellner further complicated the apparent rejection of materialism: although Madonna's character chooses Carradine's seemingly working-class admirer over wealthy suitors, he is eventually revealed to be a wealthy studio executive posing as poor, meaning that she ultimately gets both romance and wealth. Matthew Rettenmund rejected readings of the video as simply an imitation of Monroe or a celebration of greed, instead identifying independence, true love and Madonna's emerging superstardom as its central themes.

Other commentators have focused on how the video reworks Monroe's image and its representations of femininity. Allan Metz and Carol Benson saw the distinction between the two Madonnas as central to the video, noting that the musical number draws on associations with Monroe—including beauty, sexuality, glamour and materialism—before the romantic storyline suggests that Madonna is not really the "material girl" she performs. Drawing on E. Ann Kaplan's analysis, they argued that this ambiguity allows Madonna to parody conventional representations of women rather than simply reproduce them. They described her imitation of Monroe as a "feminine double-play", in which she constructs her own version of an image that was itself already constructed. Fran Lloyd similarly examined the video through the male gaze, arguing that Madonna is presented as both its object and as a woman who remains in control despite it. She pointed to the film-within-a-film plot device, in which Madonna is repeatedly watched by male characters and by the camera, while simultaneously portraying a successful woman capable of controlling a powerful man through his fascination with her. For Lloyd, the video's contradictions ultimately leave Madonna's character "uncorrupted by money and success". Matthew-Walker similarly argued that Madonna's recreation transforms the meaning of Monroe's original performance: whereas he viewed Monroe's sexuality as ultimately constrained by male attitudes, Madonna takes control of both the situation and her sexuality, becoming "the one in charge". Caroline Sullivan likewise viewed the Monroe homage as deliberately artificial, arguing that "Material Girl" demonstrated that "hollowness and artifice could be just as effective as organic sincerity". Louis Virtel for TheBacklot.com argued that Madonna went beyond simply paying tribute to Monroe through her "zealous flirtation and libidinous showmanship"; although she ostensibly craves money, the publication observed that what she ultimately commands is attention.

The video's treatment of materialism has also prompted broader interpretations. Charlie Martin of Catholic newspaper The Belleville Messenger viewed its conflicting message as an opportunity to question the relationship between possessions and personal worth. He contrasted consumer culture's association of wealth with desirability with a Christian conception of love as unconditional and independent of material possessions. Thomas Ferraro further distinguished between the actress in the romantic storyline and the Monroe-inspired character she plays in the musical number, referring to them as the "frame Madonna" and "interior Madonna", respectively. He argued that although the framing story appears to separate Madonna from the materialism of her performance, the distinction is deliberately blurred: Carradine wins her affection only after pretending to lack wealth, while the "material girl" remains closely connected to Madonna's public persona. Ferraro therefore viewed Madonna as simultaneously parodying, embracing and transforming the image rather than simply rejecting it. The Independent regarded "Material Girl" as the beginning of Madonna's recurring tributes to Marilyn Monroe and as an important moment in her relationship with MTV, arguing that their "mutually beneficial relationship" subsequently "set the bar for her contemporaries".

"Material Girl" earned Madonna her first nomination for Best Female Video at the 1985 MTV Video Music Awards. It has subsequently appeared on several retrospective rankings. Slant Magazine, TheBacklot.com and Rolling Stone ranked it as Madonna's seventh, tenth and eleventh best music video, respectively. Parade placed it 18th and considered it "more iconic" than the video for "Like a Virgin". Out magazine's Julien Sauvalle considered "Material Girl" one of Madonna's "most stylish" videos. Rolling Stone Australia ranked it number 54 on its list of the 100 greatest music videos, praising Madonna's reinterpretation of Monroe and describing the clip as a "blueprint for feminist videos for decades to come". Madonna's Monroe-inspired pink dress has also been regarded as one of the most iconic looks of her career. (Note: Attributed to multiple sources, including Bustle, Entertainment Weekly, Harper's Bazaar, InStyle, and People.)

== Live performances ==
Madonna performing a hard rock version of "Material Girl" on the Re-Invention World Tour (2004)

Madonna has included "Material Girl" on five of her concert tours: Virgin (1985), Who's That Girl (1987), Blond Ambition (1990), Re-Invention (2004), and Rebel Heart (2015―2016). On the first, it served as the closing number. The performance recreated elements of the music video, with Madonna appearing in diamonds and fur while members of the band presented her with cash and jewelry. Rejecting the song's materialistic persona, she asked the audience, "Do you really think I'm a material girl?", before declaring that she did not need money but love and throwing fake bills into the crowd. The number ended when a prerecorded voice representing her father ordered her offstage, signaling that "playtime [is] over". During the second of two concerts at Detroit's Cobo Arena, Madonna's actual father, Silvio Ciccone, appeared onstage during the routine and escorted her off himself. The Detroit concerts were filmed for the tour's video release.

For the Who's That Girl World Tour, the song was performed as part of a medley with "Like a Virgin" and "Dress You Up" (1985). Madonna sang in a cracked voice that may have parodied jazz singer Mildred Bailey, changed clothes inside an onstage telephone booth, and emerged wearing what author Michelle Morgan described as one of the show's most elaborate costumes: a dress covered in toys, trinkets, and other plastic paraphernalia. At one point, she bent over to reveal a pair of lace panties emblazoned with the word "Kiss", before removing them and throwing them into the crowd. A performance from this tour was included on the video release Ciao Italia: Live from Italy (1988).

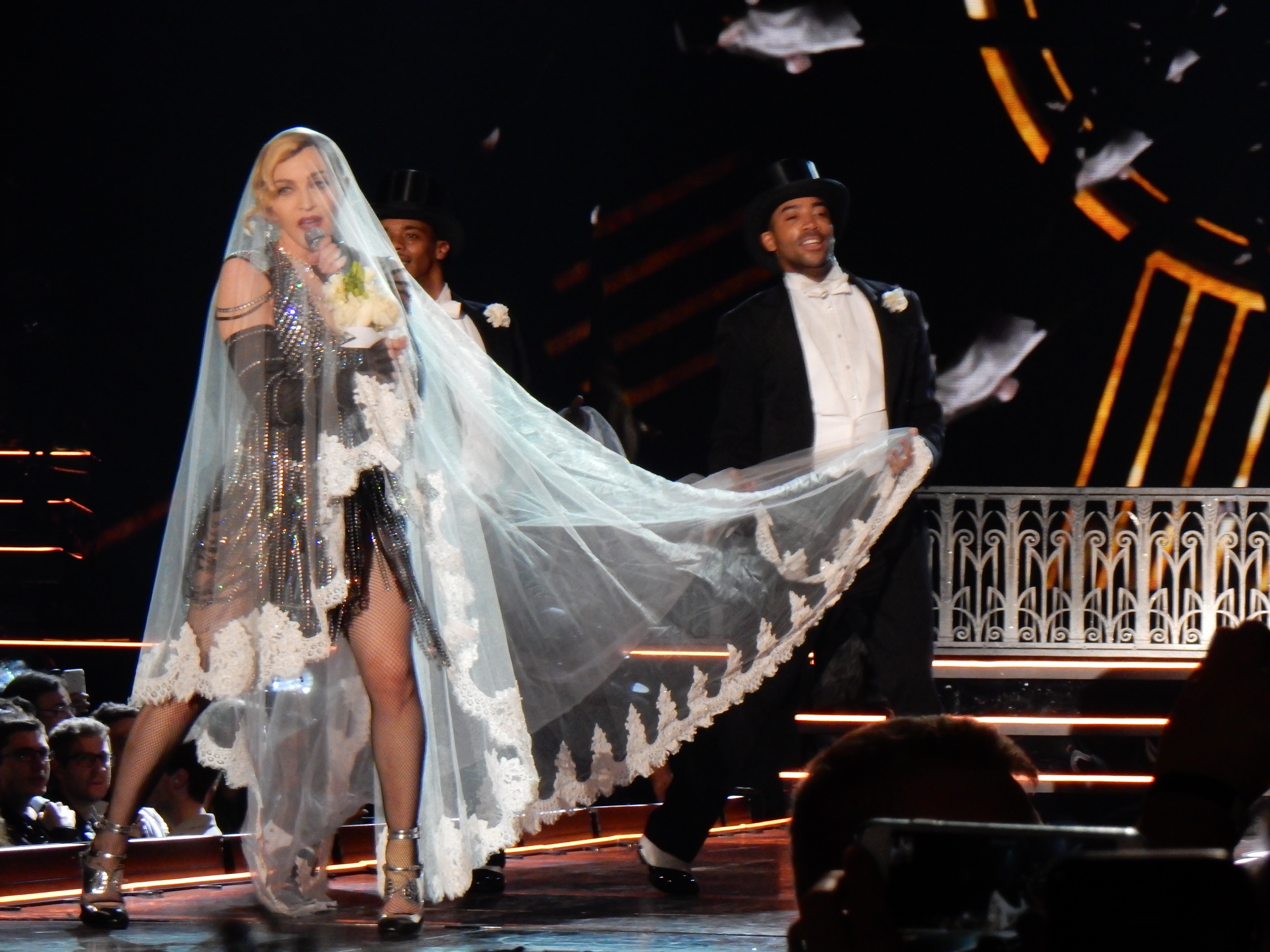
Madonna singing "Material Girl" during the Rebel Heart Tour (2015–2016)

On the Blond Ambition World Tour, Madonna sang "Material Girl" with backing vocalists Niki Haris and Donna De Lory while seated on a raised platform, dressed in bathrobes and hair curlers. The performance was presented in a deliberately camp style, with the trio singing in exaggerated accents, high-pitched voices and intentionally off-key. Madonna also altered the lyric "experience has made me rich" to "experience has made me a bitch", after which she pulled dollar bills from her corsage and tossed them into the air. The performance was included on the tour's LaserDisc release.

A hard rock-oriented rendition of "Material Girl" was performed during the Re-Invention World Tour, with Madonna playing electric guitar, dressed in military fatigues. Angela Pacienza of Yahoo News noted that the performance caused "some of the loudest screams of the night". During the Detroit concert of the Sticky & Sweet Tour on November 18, 2008, Madonna performed an a cappella rendition of "Material Girl" at the audience's request. Lyrical elements of the track were incorporated to the performance of "Girl Gone Wild" on the MDNA Tour (2012).

The Rebel Heart Tour's performance had Madonna dressed in a crystal-studded, flapper-inspired outfit by Moschino, performing atop a tilted video screen from which she pushed male dancers wearing tuxedos and top hats. The number ended with her walking down the catwalk wearing a bridal veil and carrying a white bouquet, which she eventually tossed into the audience. Don Chareunsy of the Las Vegas Sun described the performance as "reimagined, inventive, strong and just downright fun". It was later included on the tour's 2017 live album.

== Cover versions and usage ==
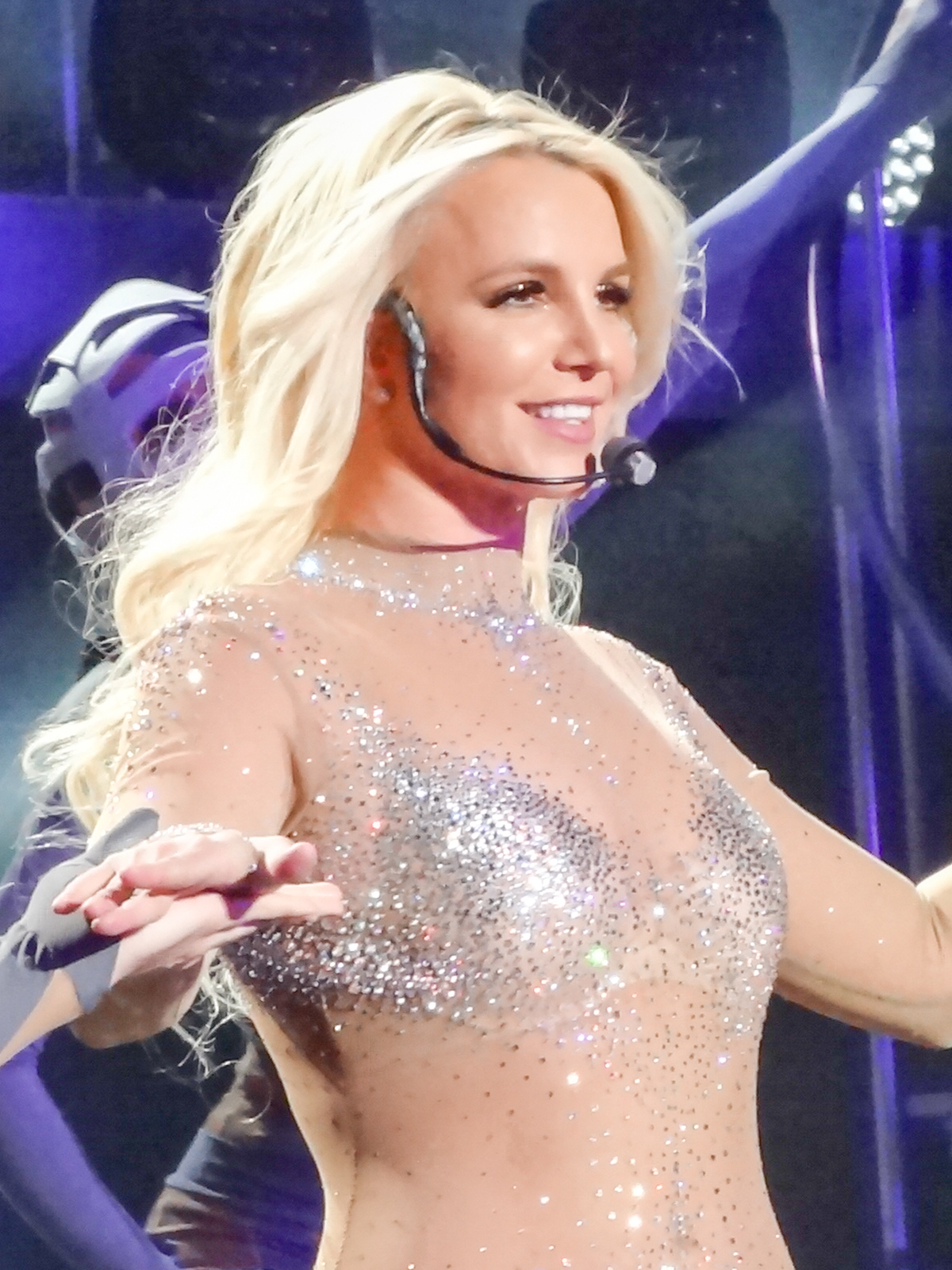
Britney Spears (left, pictured in 2014) and Sabrina Carpenter (right, pictured in 2025) are among the artists who have performed cover versions of "Material Girl".

"Material Girl" has been covered, sampled and referenced in popular culture since its release. In 1985, Cantopop singer Sally Yeh recorded a Cantonese version titled "Material Girl (200 Du)" (200度), which was later featured on the soundtrack of the 2018 film Crazy Rich Asians. KMFDM did a rendition of the song for the 1999 tribute album Virgin Voices: A Tribute to Madonna, Vol. 1, which AllMusic's Steve Huey considered one of the album's best tracks. Cover band Richard Cheese recorded a lounge version for their 2004 album I'd Like a Virgin. Sisters Hilary and Haylie Duff recorded a cover of "Material Girl" for their 2006 film Material Girls. Produced by Lil Jon, the recording was used during the film's opening and was also included on the compilation album (Lip Smackers Presents) Girl Next. According to Haylie, it was not released as a single because there was not enough time to film a music video. Stereogum gave the recording a negative review, remarking that, after previously covering "Our Lips Are Sealed" by the Go-Go's, the Duff sisters seemed intent on "ruin[ing] '80s nostalgia for everyone". In 2021, Mexican singer Laura León and group Tropikal Forever recorded a Spanish tropical reinterpretation titled "En materia de amor" ("In matters of love"). Rather than directly translating the original lyrics, the version was rewritten with a message about women's empowerment.

The song has also been performed live by several artists. Britney Spears sang it during her 1999 ...Baby One More Time Tour, as part of a medley that paid homage to the female artists who had influenced her. Jane Ganahl of the San Francisco Chronicle described Spears's rendition as "serviceable", though she felt it lacked Madonna's "wit or irony". In March 2008, Icelandic singer Hafdís Huld performed a cover during the final night of South by Southwest (SXSW). Elton John paired "Material Girl" with "Like a Virgin" at the 2010 Rock for the Rainforest benefit concert. English indie rock band Wet Leg recorded a live cover for a 2022 session on SiriusXMU, reworking the song with guitars and psychedelic effects. Sabrina Carpenter later sang the track on several dates of her Short n' Sweet Tour (2024–2025) as part of its recurring "spin the bottle" surprise-song segment.

Italian band The Tamperer featuring Maya sampled "Material Girl" on their 1998 single "If You Buy This Record (Your Life Will Be Better)", which reached the top three of the UK Singles Chart. In 1989, Sesame Street parodied "Material Girl" as "Cereal Girl", featuring an all-female Muppet group singing about their love for cornflakes and porridge. In the musical film Moulin Rouge! (2001), "Sparkling Diamonds", performed by Nicole Kidman, incorporates "Material Girl" into a medley with "Diamonds Are a Girl's Best Friend". For the film's stage adaptation, "Material Girl" was incorporated into "The Sparkling Diamond", alongside portions of "Diamonds Are Forever" (1971) by Shirley Bassey and "Single Ladies (Put a Ring on It)" (2008) by Beyoncé. "Material Girl" was also featured as a playable song in the 2006 rhythm game Elite Beat Agents for the Nintendo DS. In the second episode of the third season of Stranger Things, "Material Girl" plays during a shopping mall sequence featuring characters Eleven (Millie Bobby Brown) and Max (Sadie Sink). Billboard include the scene among the show's eight best musical moments.

== Legacy ==
=== Recognition ===
Retrospective reviews have consistently ranked "Material Girl" among Madonna's greatest recordings. (Note: Attributed to multiple sources, including The A.V. Club, The Arizona Republic, TheBacklot.com, Billboard, Boston.com, Classic Pop, Consequence, The Detroit News, Entertainment Weekly, Forbes, Gay Star News, Jenesaispop, NME, Parade, PinkNews, Rolling Stone, USA Today. and Yahoo Voices.) It has also been regarded as emblematic of the materialism and consumer culture associated with the 1980s. Classic Pop described it as an "anthem for the peak of the capitalist age", while Scott Kearnan of Boston.com argued that its upbeat sound embodied the Reagan era's "glamorization of excess and avarice". According to Consequence, the song was "at the heart of every valley girl's fantasy", arguing that its preference for materialism over relationships suited the decade. Author Christopher Feldman similarly wrote that "no song seemed more appropriate for the 'Me decade' of the 80s than 'Material Girl'". Stephen Feinstein viewed the song as representative of Americans' growing desire to acquire wealth and material goods, contrasting this attitude with the social idealism associated to the 1960s and 70s.

Commentators have particularly associated the song with the decade's yuppie culture and economic climate. Matthew Rettenmund wrote that it resonated with the yuppie mentality prevalent at the time, while The Guardian cited it as a reflection of the yuppie lifestyle and Vogue described it as a "winking, Reagan-era" response to yuppie materialism. Both The New Yorker and Kevin Mattson described "Material Girl" as a "yuppie anthem"; Mattson further characterized it as a celebration of consumer hedonism, arguing that its theme of female empowerment was ultimately overshadowed by its emphasis on material possessions and consumer capitalism. The A.V. Club similarly characterized the song as both a celebration and critique of the Reagan era, while Slant Magazine regarded it as "among the most definitive pop artifacts from the indulgent Reagan era". Adam Graham of The Detroit News considered it "perfect for its era of excess". More broadly, The Advocate called it a "generation-defining" song, while Forbes named it one of the defining songs of the 1980s.

The song was included in Bruce Pollock's Rock Song Index: The 7500 Most Important Songs for the Rock & Roll Era. In 2007, Steve Spears of the Tampa Bay Times argued that "Material Girl" should have been included instead of "Like a Virgin" on Rolling Stone's list of "40 Songs That Changed the World".

=== Impact ===
"I can't completely disdain the song and the video, because they certainly were important to my career. But talk about the media hanging on a phrase and misinterpreting the damn thing as well. I didn't write that song, and the video was about how the girl rejected diamonds and money. But God forbid irony should be understood. So when I'm ninety, I'll still be the 'Material Girl'. I guess it's not so bad. Lana Turner was the 'Sweater girl' until the day she died".

— Madonna on her association with the "Material Girl" nickname.

The song also had a lasting impact on Madonna's public image, with "Material Girl" becoming an enduring nickname for her. Both producer Nile Rodgers and PinkNews have noted the persistence of the "Material Girl" nickname; Rodgers pointed to it as evidence of the song's enduring impact, while PinkNews observed that the moniker has endured despite Madonna's extensive exploration of sex, religion and love throughout her music. Madonna herself has expressed ambivalence about the association, saying that had she known she would continually be referred to as the "Material Girl", she probably would not have recorded the song. In 2015, she went further, naming it the least favorite of her catalogue and bluntly saying, "I never want to hear it again!"

People regarded "Material Girl" as a defining song for Madonna, observing that it both represented her early public persona and later provided an image against which she could contrast herself as she matured as a performer. Similarly, The A.V. Club wrote that song cemented the superstardom established by "Like a Virgin", while giving Madonna a nickname she did not necessarily deserve, noting that she neither wrote the song nor personally embodied its celebration of wealth. Classic Pop likewise observed that she did not identify with the song's materialistic connotations, instead regarding them as ironic and provocative. Billboard noted that Madonna had resisted the moniker for decades because of its implication that she was a "vapid, riches-obsessed celebrity", but argued that the song could instead be interpreted as portraying a woman who knows what she wants and pursues it on her own terms.

The "Material Girl" moniker also became a point of reference in discussions of Madonna's evolving public persona. Guilbert cited a 1993 conference at the University of California, Santa Barbara, titled Madonna: Feminist Icon or Material Girl?, which examined the difficulty of reconciling competing interpretations of Madonna as a feminist figure. He later contrasted the materialism she had represented in the 1980s with her embrace of spirituality in the following decade, noting that by 1998 The Times and The Advocate had dubbed her the "Ethereal Girl" and "Spiritual Girl", respectively. Discussing her 1999 single "Nothing Really Matters", Chuck Arnold similarly described Madonna's evolution through motherhood as a transition from the "Material Girl" to the "Maternal Girl". In 2010, Madonna and her daughter Lourdes Leon used the name for their Material Gir clothing line, launched at Macy's with Taylor Momsen as its spokesmodel. The name subsequently became the subject of a trademark dispute with clothing retailer LA Triumph, which claimed to have sold "Material Girl" apparel since 1997. Madonna argued that her performance of the song had established her prior use of the name, but a federal judge rejected the argument, ruling that "the singing of a song does not create a trademark".

== Track listing and formats ==
- Seven-inch single
1. "Material Girl" – 3:56
2. "Pretender" – 4:28
- Twelve-inch and CD single
1. "Material Girl" (Jellybean dance remix) – 6:06
2. "Pretender" – 4:28
- 2024 digital single
1. "Material Girl" (2024 remaster) – 4:00
2. "Pretender" (2024 remaster) – 4:28
3. "Material Girl" (extended dance mix) (2024 remaster) – 6:05

== Credits and personnel ==
Credits are adapted from the Like a Virgin album notes.

- Madonna – vocals
- Peter Brown – songwriter
- Robert Rans – songwriter
- Nile Rodgers – production, guitar, Synclavier II, Roland Juno-60
- Bernard Edwards – bass
- Tony Thompson – drums
- Curtis King – background vocals
- Frank Simms – background vocals
- George Simms – background vocals

== Charts ==
=== Weekly charts ===
1985 weekly chart performance for "Material Girl"
Chart (1985)	Peak position
Argentina (Prensario)	4
Australia (Kent Music Report)	4
Austria (Ö3 Austria Top 40)	8
Belgium (Ultratop 50 Flanders)	4
Canada Top Singles (RPM)	4
Brazil (UPI)	7
European Hot 100 Singles (Music & Media)	5
Finland (Suomen virallinen lista)	17
France (SNEP)	47
Italy (Musica e dischi)	18
Ireland (IRMA)	3
Netherlands (Dutch Top 40)	7
Netherlands (Single Top 100)	7
New Zealand (Recorded Music NZ)	5
Spain (PROMUSICAE)	10
South Africa (Springbok)	6
Switzerland (Schweizer Hitparade)	15
UK Singles (Official Charts)	3
US Billboard Hot 100	2
US Adult Contemporary (Billboard)	38
US Dance Club Songs (Billboard)	1
US Dance Singles Sales (Billboard)	2
US Hot R&B/Hip-Hop Songs (Billboard)	49
US Cash Box Top 100 Pop Singles	1
US CHR & Pop Charts (Radio & Records)	1
West Germany (GfK)	13

2015 weekly chart performance for "Material Girl"
Chart (2015)	Peak position
Poland Airplay (ZPAV)	91

=== Year-end charts ===
1985 year-end chart performance for "Material Girl"
Chart (1985)	Position
Australia (Kent Music Report)	48
Belgium (Ultratop 50 Flanders)	56
Canada Top Singles (RPM)	46
Netherlands (Dutch Top 40)	77
Netherlands (Single Top 100)	57
UK Singles (Gallup)	51
US Billboard Hot 100	58
US Dance Singles Sales (Billboard)	41
US Cash Box Top 100	30

== Certifications and sales ==
Certifications and sales for "Material Girl"
Region	Certification	Certified units/sales
Italy (FIMI)	Gold	50,000^{‡}
Japan (Oricon Charts)	—	47,060
New Zealand (RMNZ)	Platinum	30,000^{‡}
Spain (Promusicae)	Platinum	60,000^{‡}
United Kingdom (BPI) Original release	Silver	250,000^{^}
United Kingdom (BPI) 2006 release	Platinum	600,000^{‡}
United States Digital downloads	—	347,000
^{^} Shipments figures based on certification alone.^{‡} Sales+streaming figures based on certification alone.

== "Material Gworrllllllll!" ==
"Material Gworrllllllll!"

Song by Madonna and Saucy Santana
- Released: August 5, 2022
- Recorded: 2022
- Genre: Electronic; Hip hop
- Length: 2:42
- Label: Warner
- Songwriters: Madonna; Saucy Santana; Mike Dean; Johnny Goldstein; Robert Rans; Peter Brown; Tate Kobang; Jozzy; TrellGotWings; Tre Trax
- Producer: Mike Dean

Madonna chronology
"Break My Soul" (The Queens Remix) (2022)	"Material Gworrllllllll!" (2022)	"Hung Up on Tokischa" (2022)

Saucy Santana chronology
"Booty" (2022)	"Material Gworrllllllll!" (2022)	"I'm Too Much" (2022)

Lyric video
- "Material Gworrllllllll!" on YouTube

In 2022, Madonna collaborated with American rapper Saucy Santana on "Material Gworrllllllll!", a remix of his 2019 song "Material Girl", which was itself inspired by the original. Santana's track had gained popularity on TikTok, where it was used in more than 1.1 million videos, and its viral success caught Madonna's attention. She personally invited Santana to perform with her at WoW, Finally Enough Love, a New York City Pride show held at Terminal 5 in June 2022. Santana described being selected by Madonna as a surprise and working with her in the studio as a "dream".

Madonna and Santana debuted "Material Gworrllllllll!" during the Terminal 5 show, before officially releasing it on August 5, 2022. An electronic and rap track, the remix combines elements of Santana's song with references to the original "Material Girl". Madonna contributes newly recorded vocals, including a rap verse and pre-chorus that revisit the original's materialistic themes from a contemporary perspective; she declares that "a material girl is not tasteless" and boasts about making "a budget disappear like a magic trick". Entertainment Weekly's Joey Nolfi described the track as reframing Madonna's cultural impact for a 2022 audience. It debuted and peaked at number 69 on the UK Singles Downloads Chart, before dropping off the chart the following week.

"Material Gworrllllllll!" was released prior to Finally Enough Love: 50 Number Ones, which was issued on August 19. Around the same time, she was revisiting her back catalogue with younger listeners in mind. Speaking about her reworkings of older songs, Madonna said she was looking for "interesting, fun ways" to rerelease her music and introduce it "to a new generation". Writing for Variety, Mike Wass viewed the collaboration as evidence of the original song's continued appeal, observing that "Material Girl" still had a "vice-like grip on partygoers" 38 years after its release.

=== Charts ===
2022 weekly chart performance for "Material Gworrllllllll!"
Chart (2022)	Peak position
UK Singles Downloads (Official Charts)	69

== Literary sources ==
- Andersen, Christopher P. (1992). Madonna, unauthorized. Signet Books. ISBN 978-0-451-17454-3.
- Bego, Mark (2000). Madonna: Blonde Ambition. Cooper Square Press. ISBN 978-0-8154-1051-5.
- Benstock, Shari; Ferriss, Suzanne (1994). On Fashion. Rutgers University Press. ISBN 978-0-8135-2033-9.
- Betts, Graham (2006). Complete UK Hit Singles 1952-2006. Collins Publishing. ISBN 978-0-00-720077-1.
- Cross, Mary (2007). Madonna: A Biography. Greenwood Publishing Group. ISBN 978-0-313-33811-3.
- Easlea, Daryl (2012). Madonna: Blond Ambition. Backbeat Books. ISBN 978-1-61713-034-2.
- Feinstein, Stephen (2015). The 1980s. Enslow Publishing. ISBN 978-0-7660-6935-0.
- Feldman, Christopher (2000). Billboard Book of Number 2 Singles. Billboard Books. ISBN 978-0-8230-7695-6.
- Ferraro, Thomas J. (2005). Feeling Italian: The Art of Ethnicity in America. New York University Press. ISBN 978-0-8147-2839-0.
- Finch, Christopher (1993). Jim Henson: The Works: The Art, the Magic, the Imagination. Random House. ISBN 978-0-679-41203-8.
- Fouz-Hernández, Santiago; Jarman-Ivens, Freya (2004). Madonna's Drowned Worlds. Ashgate Publishing, Ltd. ISBN 978-0-7546-3371-6.
- Gabriel, Mary (2023). Madonna: A Rebel Life. Hachette UK. ISBN 978-0-316-45644-9.
- Guilbert, Georges-Claude (2002). Madonna as Postmodern Myth. McFarland. ISBN 978-0-7864-1408-6.
- Homan, Shane, ed. (2006). Access All Eras: Tribute Bands and Global Pop Culture. Open University Press. ISBN 978-0-335-21690-1.
- Kellner, Douglas (1995). Media Culture: Cultural Studies, Identity, and Politics Between the Modern and the Postmodern. Routledge. ISBN 978-0-415-10570-5.
- Lloyd, Fran (1993). Deconstructing Madonna. Batsford. ISBN 978-0-7134-7402-2.
- Matthew-Walker, Robert (1991). Madonna: The Biography. Sidgwick & Jackson. ISBN 978-0-330-31482-4.
- Mattson, Kevin (2020). We're Not Here to Entertain: Punk Rock, Ronald Reagan, and the Real Culture War of 1980s America. Oxford University Press. ISBN 978-0-19-090825-6.
- McGrath, Tom (2024). Triumph of the Yuppies: America, the Eighties, and the Creation of an Unequal Nation. Grand Central Publishing. ISBN 978-1-5387-2601-3.
- Metz, Allen; Benson, Carol (1999). The Madonna Companion: Two Decades of Commentary. Music Sales Group. ISBN 978-0-02-864972-6.
- Morgan, Michelle (2015). Madonna. Constable & Robinson. ISBN 978-0-7624-5621-5.
- Pollock, Bruce (2005). Rock Song Index: The 7500 Most Important Songs for the Rock & Roll Era. Routledge. ISBN 978-0-415-97073-0.
- Rettenmund, Matthew (1995). Encyclopedia Madonnica. St. Martin's Press. ISBN 978-0-312-11782-5.
- Rooksby, Rikky (2004). The Complete Guide to the Music of Madonna. Omnibus Press. ISBN 978-0-7119-9883-4.
- Sexton, Adam (1992). Desperately Seeking Madonna: In Search of the Meaning of the World's Most Famous Woman. Random Penguin. ISBN 978-0-307-48374-4.
- Sullivan, Caroline (2014). Madonna: Her Story. Seven Oaks Publishing. ISBN 978-1-78177-179-2.
- Taraborrelli, Randy J. (2001). Madonna: An Intimate Biography. Simon & Schuster. ISBN 978-0-283-07289-5.
