= In Effect Mode =

Studio album by Al B. Sure!
- Released: May 3, 1988
- Recorded: Fall 1986 – Spring 1988
- Studio: Unique; New York City, New York
- Genre: New jack swing
- Length: 38:25
- Label: Uptown; Warner Bros.
- Producer: Al B. Sure!; Kyle West; Teddy Riley

Al B. Sure! chronology
In Effect Mode (1988)	Private Times...and the Whole 9! (1990)

In Effect Mode is the debut album by Al B. Sure!. It was released on May 3, 1988, on Uptown Records with distribution handled by Warner Bros. Records. It was one of two albums by Sure! that was released under Uptown that were not issued under its parent company MCA Records.

== Background and recording ==
Sure! got his initial start when he performed at the 1987 Sony Innovators Award, an annual talent showcase that awarded people who showed promising talent. Music producer Quincy Jones handpicked Sure! as the first winner of the contest. Warner Bros. Vice President of black music Benny Medina offered Sure! a recording contract to record his debut.

Sure! got his start in the music industry singing background vocals on Heavy D. & The Boyz' 1987 debut Living Large. He appeared on the song "Dedication" as well as the singles "Don't You Know" and "Moneyearnin' Mount Vernon" due to being childhood friends with group member Edward "Eddie F" Ferrell. That friendship lead to him meeting Andre Harrell, who brought Sure! into the fold at his newly established imprint Uptown Records.

Sure! initially wanted to make his debut as a rapper, but later decided to focus on R&B after listening to the music his cousin Kyle West was making. As a result, he enlisted West as the co-producer for his debut album. Sure! and West wrote virtually all the songs together, save for their cover of Lori Lieberman's "Killing Me Softly" - which was popularized by singer Roberta Flack - and "If I'm Not Your Lover".

West recalls recording In Effect Mode as lacking direction because neither he nor Sure! had any idea what they were doing. Because of Sure!'s last minute change from rapping to singing, he had to learn how to write songs and melodies in a short period of time. Within the span of six months, he made the transition from being a rapper to being a singer.

The album's first single "Nite and Day" was the first song recorded for In Effect Mode. West wrote and recorded the music in January 1987, but decided to abandon it when he couldn't compose any lyrics for the song. Over a month later, Sure! heard the music and wrote only a chorus for the song, but had yet to write any verses. By the time they went to the recording studio, Sure! had completed the song. Despite having yet to record an album, everyone in the studio felt the song was going to be a huge hit.

Producer Teddy Riley was called in to give the album some direction. He wasn't around long enough to oversee it due to being called in to work on Keith Sweat's debut Make It Last Forever. He produced two songs for In Effect Mode: "If I'm Not Your Lover" and "You Can Call Me Crazy", however only "If I'm Not Your Lover" made the final track listing. "You Can Call Me Crazy" was later included on Guy's self-titled debut with Timmy Gatling's lead vocals and Sure! contributing uncredited background vocals.

Three singles were released from In Effect Mode: "Nite and Day", "Off On Your Own (Girl)" and "Rescue Me". Each single had music videos, all of which were directed by Peter Nydrle.

== Reception ==
Professional ratings
Review scores
Source	Rating
AllMusic	4/5 stars
The Village Voice	B+

Released on May 3, 1988, as a joint venture between Uptown Records and Warner Bros. Records, it was a huge success, having made it to No. 20 on the Billboard 200 and No. 1 on the Top R&B/Hip-Hop Albums Chart (where it remained for seven weeks). Produced with his cousin Kyle West, five singles were released from the album, all of which made it to the Billboard singles charts: "Nite and Day," "Off on Your Own (Girl)," "Rescue Me," "If I'm Not Your Lover" and "Killing Me Softly." A French-language version of "Night and Day" ("Nuit et Jour") was also recorded, but it only appeared on the 12-inch maxi-single of the original.

== Track listing ==
- All songs are written and composed by Al B. Sure! and Kyle West, except where noted
1. "Nite and Day" – 3:59
2. "Oooh, This Love is So" – 4:39
3. "Killing Me Softly" (Norman Gimbel, Charles Fox) – 4:51
4. "Naturally Mine" – 4:14
5. "Rescue Me" – 3:57
6. "Off on Your Own (Girl)" – 4:09
7. "If I'm Not Your Lover" (Al B. Sure!, Timmy Gatling) – 4:07
8. "Just a Taste of Lovin'" – 4:22
9. "Noche y Día" – 4:03

== Personnel ==
- Les Davis, Teddy Riley – guitars
- Kyle West – keyboards, keyboard programming
- Al B. Sure! – lead and backing vocals, horn arrangements, drum programming, recording engineer, mixing
- Rodney Grant – keyboards, keyboard programming
- Michelle Amar – speech and spoken word
- Tabitha Brace, Sharon Harris, Terri Robinson, Todd Auston – backing vocals
- Michelle Boissierre – translation (English to Spanish)

Technical

- Ken Collins, Roey Shamir – recording engineers, mixing
- Benny Medina, Andre Harrell – executive producers
- Carlton Batts – mastering
- Kav Deluxe – design
- Calvin Lowery – art direction
- Deano Mueller – photography

== Charts ==
Chart (1988)	Peak position
US Billboard Pop Albums	20
US Top Soul Albums (Billboard)	1

=== Singles ===
Year	Single	Chart positions	
Year	Single	US Pop	US R&B
1988	"Nite and Day"	7	1
1988	"Off on Your Own (Girl)"	45	1
1988	"Rescue Me"	—	3
1988	"Killing Me Softly"	80	14
1989	"If I'm Not Your Lover"	—	2

== Certifications ==
Region	Certification	Certified units/sales
United States (RIAA)	2× Platinum	2,000,000^{^}
^{^} Shipments figures based on certification alone.

== See also ==
- List of number-one R&B albums of 1988 (U.S.)
