= Nite and Day =

Single by Al B. Sure!

from the album In Effect Mode
- B-side: "Nuit et Jour"
- Released: March 12, 1988
- Recorded: 1987
- Studio: Unique Recording Studios
- Genre: R&B; new jack swing
- Length: 4:02
- Label: Warner Bros.
- Songwriters: Albert Brown, Kyle West
- Producers: Al B. Sure!, Kyle West

Al B. Sure! singles chronology
"Nite and Day" (1988)	"Off on Your Own (Girl)" (1988)

"Nite and Day" is the debut single by Al B. Sure! from his debut album In Effect Mode (1988). It reached number seven on the US Billboard Hot 100 and number one on the Billboard Hot Black Singles chart. The B-side of the record is the French version of the song, "Nuit et Jour".

The song was written and produced by Al B. Sure! and Kyle West. The song was recorded at Unique Recording Studios in 1987, and it was mixed by Roey Shamir for INFX Production, Inc. The single earned Al B. Sure! a nomination for a Grammy Award for Best Male R&B Vocal Performance at the 31st Grammy Awards in 1989, losing to Introducing the Hardline According to Terence Trent D'Arby by Terence Trent D'Arby.

A music video for the song was released in 1988 and it features Al B. Sure! performing the song in various locations throughout New York City, including on a roof top, in Central Park, and on the street. It was directed by Peter Nydrle.

== Covers ==
- In 2003, a cover version by Ronny Jordan was covered from his album At Last.
- In 2009, a cover version by Raheem DeVaughn was leaked as a song from his mixtape, Love & War.
- In 2012, a cover version by Adrian Marcel was released with a music video.
- In 2017, a cover version as a dance/electronic remix by Todd Terry & DJ S.K.T was released as a single.
- In 2017, Al B Sure!'s son, Quincy, reworked the song as "I Can Tell You (Nite and Day 2.0)" featuring Al B. Sure!, using samples of the original.
- In 2018, B. Howard was released the song "Nite and Day 3.0 / Girl You Gotta Know", using samples of the original.
- In 2018, a cover version by Meshell Ndegeocello was released on her cover album, Ventriloquism.

== Charts ==
=== Weekly charts ===
Chart (1988)	Peak position
US Billboard Hot 100	7
US Adult Contemporary (Billboard)	19
US Hot Black Singles (Billboard)	1

=== Year-end charts ===
Chart (1988)	Position
US Billboard Hot 100	87
