= Honey I'm Home =

Honey I'm Home may refer to:

- "Honey, I'm Home", a 1998 song by Shania Twain
- Honey I'm Home (album), a 2009 album by Al B. Sure!
