= Private Times...and the Whole 9! =

Studio album by Al B. Sure!
- Released: October 16, 1990
- Recorded: 1989–1990
- Genre: R&B, new jack swing
- Length: 76:29
- Label: Uptown; Warner Bros.
- Producer: Al B. Sure!, DeVanté Swing, Kyle West, DJ Eddie F, Nevelle Hodge

Al B. Sure! chronology
In Effect Mode (1988)	Private Times...and the Whole 9! (1990)	Sexy Versus (1992)

Private Times...and the Whole 9! is the second album by American R&B recording artist Al B. Sure!, released on October 16, 1990, under Uptown Records with distribution handled by Warner Bros. Records. It was the final album by Sure! to be released under Uptown Records, and the second after In Effect Mode not to be distributed under Uptown's parent company MCA Records.

== Reception ==
Professional ratings
Review scores
Source	Rating
Allmusic	3/5 stars

Though not as successful as his debut album In Effect Mode, Private Times achieved a level of popularity, making it to #20 on the Billboard 200 chart and #4 on the Top R&B/Hip-Hop Albumschart. Two singles reached the Top 5 on the R&B Singles chart; "Missunderstanding" reached #1, and "No Matter What You Do," a duet with Diana Ross, peaked at #4.

"No Matter What You Do" was included on Ross' internationally successful multi-platinum album "The Force Behind the Power," giving Sure! valuable exposure in Pan-Asian nations and across continental European territories. Prior to that time, Al B. Sure! hadn't had much visibility outside of the States.

== Track listing ==
All tracks composed by Al B. Sure! and Kyle West; except where indicated

1. "Hotel California" – (Don Felder, Don Henley, Glenn Frey) 5:46
2. "Touch You" – (Al B. Sure!, DeVanté Swing) 5:26
3. "So Special" – 5:37
4. "I Want to Know" – 5:10
5. "No Matter What You Do" – 5:15 Feat. Diana Ross
6. "Shades of Grey" – 4:36
7. "Private Times" – 5:22
8. "Missunderstanding" – (DJ Eddie F, Nevelle Hodge, Al B. Sure!) 4:34
9. "Channel J" – (Al B. Sure!, Kyle West, Chubb Rock) 4:53
10. "Had Enuf?" – (Al B. Sure!, DeVanté Swing) 4:30
11. "Just for the Moment" – 4:21
12. "Sure! Thang" – (Al B. Sure!, DeVanté Swing) 4:43
13. "You Excite Me" – (Al B. Sure!) 4:53
14. "Hotel California" (Bass Mix) – (Don Felder, Don Henley, Glenn Frey) 6:17
15. "Ooh This Jazz Is So" – 4:58

== Charts ==
=== Weekly charts ===
Chart (1990)	Peak position
US Billboard 200	20
US Top R&B/Hip-Hop Albums (Billboard)	4

=== Year-end charts ===
Chart (1991)	Position
US Top R&B/Hip-Hop Albums (Billboard)	31

=== Singles ===
Year	Single	Chart positions	
Year	Single	Billboard Hot 100	US R&B
1990	"Missunderstanding"	42	1
1991	"No Matter What You Do"	–	4
1991	"Had Enuf?"	–	28
