= Off on Your Own (Girl) =

"Off On Your Own (Girl)"

Single by Al B. Sure!

from the album In Effect Mode
- B-side: "Noche y Dia"
- Released: June 1988
- Recorded: 1987
- Genre: R&B; new jack swing
- Length: 4:09
- Label: Warner Bros.
- Songwriters: Albert Brown, Kyle West
- Producers: Al B. Sure!, Kyle West

Al B. Sure! singles chronology
"Nite and Day" (1988)	"Off On Your Own (Girl)" (1988)	"Rescue Me" (1988)

"Off on Your Own (Girl)" is a 1988 single recorded by Al B. Sure! and written and produced by Al B. Sure! and Kyle West. The single was the second release from his debut album, In Effect Mode, and peaked at number one on the Black Singles chart for two weeks. "Off on Your Own (Girl)" also peaked at number forty-five on the Hot 100.

== Chart positions ==
Chart (1988)	Peak position
U.S. Billboard Hot Black Singles	1
U.S. Billboard Hot Dance Club Play	25
U.S. Billboard Hot 100	45
