= Dance with Me (Peter Brown song) =

"Dance With Me"
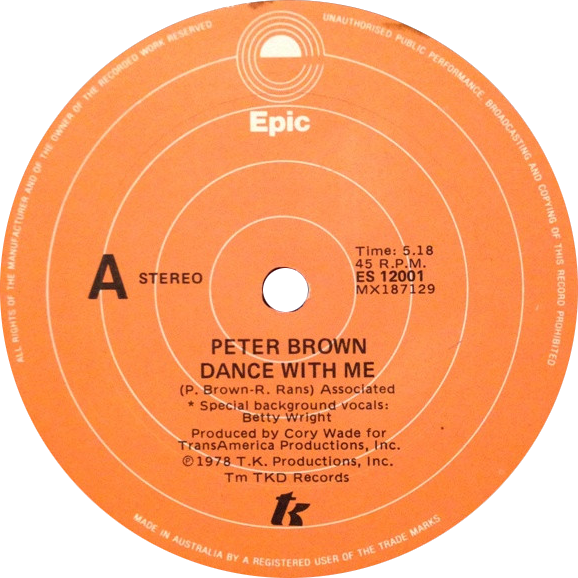
- Side A of the 12-inch Australian single

Single by Peter Brown

from the album A Fantasy Love Affair
- B-side: "For Your Love"
- Released: February 1978
- Recorded: 1978
- Genre: Disco
- Length: 5:18 (album version); 3:45 (edit)
- Label: T.K. Disco
- Songwriter(s): Peter Brown, Robert Rans
- Producer(s): Cory Wade

Peter Brown singles chronology
"Do You Wanna Get Funky with Me?" (1977)	"Dance With Me" (1978)	"You Should Do It" (1978)

"Dance With Me" is a 1978 international hit single recorded by Peter Brown. It was the second release from his first LP, and became his greatest hit. Backing vocals were provided by Betty Wright along with her girlfriends Patricia Hurley and Wildflower.

In the United States, "Dance With Me" peaked at number eight on the Billboard pop singles chart and number nine in Canada. The song did best in New Zealand, where it reached number three.

== Charts ==
=== Weekly charts ===
Chart (1978)	Peak position
Australia (ARIA)	52
Canada RPM Top Singles	9
New Zealand (RIANZ)	3
UK Singles Chart	57
US Billboard Hot 100	8
US Billboard Hot Soul Singles	5
US Billboard Disco Action	4
US Cash Box Top 100	8

=== Year-end charts ===
Chart (1978)	Rank
Canada	59
New Zealand	19
US Billboard Hot 100	29
US Cash Box	55

== Track listing ==
Side A
No.	Title	Length
1.	"Dance With Me"	3:45

Side B
No.	Title	Length
1.	"For Your Love"	5:26
