= Sexy Versus =

Studio album by Al B. Sure!
- Released: September 22, 1992
- Recorded: 1991–1992
- Genre: R&B, new jack swing
- Length: 73:31
- Label: Warner Bros. Records; 26973
- Producer: Vincent Gilbert, Kevin Deane, Kiyamma Griffin, Vincent Herbert, Al B. Sure!, DeVanté Swing, Howie Tee, Kyle West

Al B. Sure! chronology
Private Times...and the Whole 9! (1990)	Sexy Versus (1992)	Honey, I'm Home (2009)

Professional ratings
Review scores
Source	Rating
Allmusic	link

Sexy Versus is the third studio album by Al B. Sure! It was his first album released exclusively by Warner Bros. Records, his first two having been released under Uptown Records with Warner Bros. Records handling distribution.

It was not as successful as his previous two albums but still managed to find success on the charts, making it to #41 on the Billboard 200 and #2 on the Top R&B/Hip-Hop Albums. Three singles made it to the Billboard charts: "Natalie," "Right Now," and "I Don't Wanna Cry."

The track "See The Lady" is a remix of the song "Channel J" from his previous album Private Times...and the Whole 9!. The album's second single "Natalie" was written about actress Halle Berry after he saw her in the 1991 film Strictly Business. In 2014, Sure! referred to the success of the album as well as Berry's inspiration for "Natalie" on Twitter.

It was revealed on November 16, 2018 that one of the photos inside the booklet of this album in CD format is of Al B Sure! and his ex, Kim Porter.

== Track listing ==
- All Songs Co-Written By Al B. Sure!
1. "Right Now" – 5:54 (Kyle West)
2. "U & I" – 5:43 (Kiyamma Griffin)
3. "Playing Games" – 6:04 (DeVante Swing)
4. "Natalie" – 5:54 (West)
5. "Ooh 4 You Girl (ft. Grand Puba & Chubb Rock)" – 5:54 (Griffin)
6. "Kick in the Head" (ft. Rakim) – 4:58 (Kevin Deane)
7. "Turn You Out" (ft. Slick Rick) – 5:56 (Swing)
8. "See the Lady (ft. Chubb Rock)" – 5:20 (West)
9. "Thanks 4 a Great Time Last Nite" – 6:35 (Deane)
10. "I Don't Wanna Cry" – 5:14 (West)
11. "Die for You (ft. Brione Lathrop)" – 5:31 (West)
12. "I'll Never Hurt You Again" – 5:53 (West)
13. "Papes in the End (ft. Greg "To The Head" and Slick Rick)" – 4:11 (Marc Choice, Howie Tee)

== Personnel ==
- Al B. Sure! – vocals
- Ike Lee III – drum programming
- Al B. Sure!, Kevin Deane, Kiyamma Griffin, DeVanté Swing, Kyle West – keyboards
- Brione Lathrop, Chubb Rock, Grand Puba, Gregg "To The Head", Kyle West, Rakim, Slick Rick – additional vocals

=== Production ===
- Executive Producer: Benny Medina
- Produced By Al B. Sure!, Kevin Deane, Kiyamma Griffin, Vincent Herbert, DeVanté Swing, Howie Tee & Kyle West
- Engineers: Steven Ett, Michael Gilbert, Paul Logus
- Assistant Engineers: Louis Alfred III
- Mixing: Al B. Sure!, Steven Ett, Michael Gilbert, Mick Guzauski
- Mix Assistants: Andrew Godsberg, Gil Morales
- Editing: Al B. Sure!, Michael Gilbert
- Mastering: Herb Powers

== Charts ==
=== Weekly charts ===
Chart (1992)	Peak position
US Billboard 200	41
US Top R&B/Hip-Hop Albums (Billboard)	2

=== Year-end charts ===
Chart (1992)	Position
US Top R&B/Hip-Hop Albums (Billboard)	83
