= Do Ya Wanna Get Funky with Me =

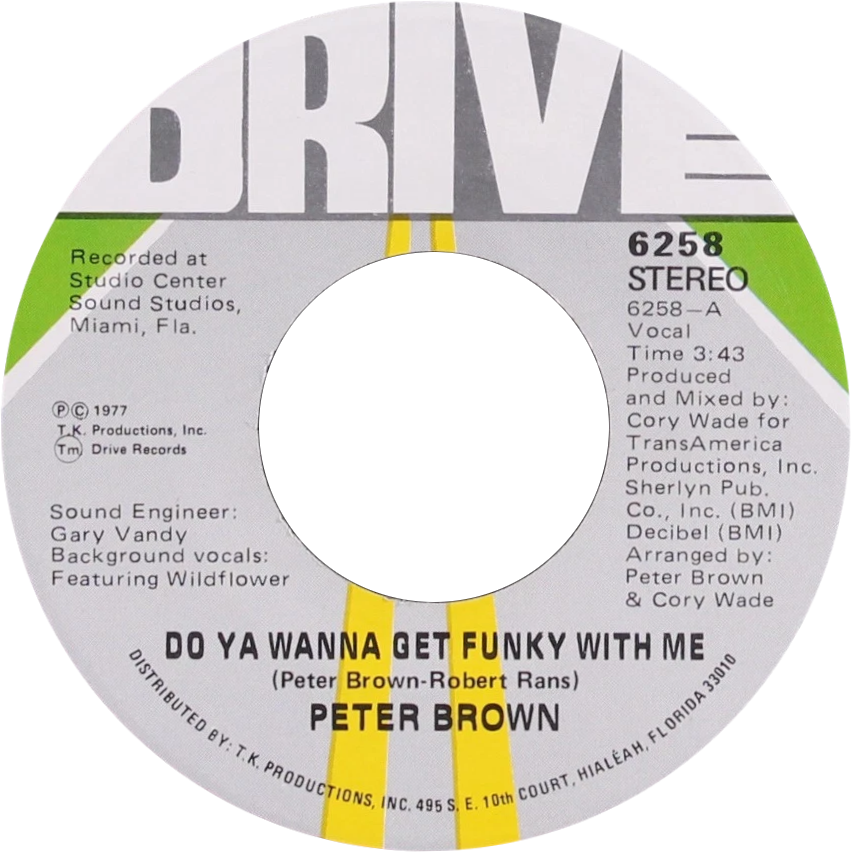
- Side A of the US 7-inch single

Single by Peter Brown

from the album A Fantasy Love Affair
- B-side: "Burning Love Breakdown"
- Released: September 1977 (US); February 1978 (Intl.)
- Genre: Disco
- Length: 3:43 (single version); 8:30 (12" version)
- Label: T.K. Disco 35 (US); T.K. Disco XB 2183 (UK)
- Songwriters: Peter Brown, Robert Rans
- Producer: Cory Wade

Peter Brown singles chronology
"Do Ya Wanna Get Funky with Me" (1977)	"Dance With Me" (1978)

"Do Ya Wanna Get Funky with Me" is a 1977 single recorded by Peter Brown. The record sold more than one million copies. It was his first hit song. Backing vocals were provided by Wildflower.

The song reached number 18 in the U.S. and number 3 R&B. It also charted in the United Kingdom, peaking at number 43.

Chicago radio superstation WLS, which gave the song much airplay, ranked "Do Ya Wanna Get Funky with Me" as the 35th most popular hit of 1977. It reached number 3 on their survey in October, 1977.

== Track listing ==
=== 1977 release ===
12" vinyl

- US: TK Disco / 35

Side A
No.	Title	Length
1.	"Do Ya Wanna Get Funky With Me"	8:30

Side B
No.	Title	Length
1.	"Burning Love Breakdown"	5:26

== Chart performance ==
=== Weekly charts ===
Chart (1977)	Peak position
US Billboard Hot 100	18
US Billboard R&B	3
US Cash Box R&B Singles	2
US Billboard Disco	9

Chart (1978)	Peak position
Australia (Kent Music Report)	69
UK	43

=== Year-end charts ===
Chart (1977)	Rank
U.S. Billboard Hot 100	123

== Legacy ==
- "Do Ya Wanna Get Funky with Me" was covered by industrial disco band My Life with the Thrill Kill Kult on their 2005 album Gay, Black and Married.
- "Burning Love Breakdown" appeared on the fictional radio station K109 The Studio in the Grand Theft Auto IV universe.
