= Peter Nydrle =

American director

- Born: Peter Nydrle; November 16, 1954; Czechoslovakia
- Died: July 5, 2014 (aged 59); Los Angeles
- Occupation: Film director
- Years active: 1980–2014
- Website: Nydrle Inc.

Peter Nydrle (November 16, 1954 – July 5, 2014) was an American commercial and music video director, producer, and director of photography. He directed various commercial spots and ran his company, Nydrle, Inc., in West Hollywood, California.

On July 4, 2011, his film Eugene Among Us had a renewed premiere at the Karlovy Vary International Film Festival to commemorate the 30th Anniversary of the film being banned by the totalitarian regime at the time in the former Czechoslovakia.

In May 1993, he directed a full-length concert video for Santana titled Sacred Fire: Live in Mexico. Produced by Paul Flattery and exec-produced by Jeannie Mattiussi, it was shot over two nights in Mexico City and released on DVD on November 2, 1993.

He died in Los Angeles in 2014.

== Videography ==
- Jeff Lorber featuring Karyn White - "Facts Of Love" (1986)
- George Benson & Earl Klugh - "Dreamin'" (1987)
- Al B. Sure! - "Nite and Day", "Off On Your Own (Girl)", "Rescue Me" (1988)
- Think Out Loud - "After All This Time" (1988)
- Club Nouveau - "For the Love of Frances" (1988), "No Friend Of Mine" (1989)
- Tracie Spencer - "Hide And Seek" (1988)
- BeBe & CeCe Winans - "Heaven" (1988), "Addictive Love" (1991), "It's OK" (1992)
- Cheryl Lynn - "Everytime I Try to Say Goodbye" (1989)
- BoDeans - "You Don't Get Much" (1989)
- Jasmine Guy - "Try Me" (1990), "Just Want to Hold You" (1991)
- Michael Cooper - "Just What I Like" (1989)
- Dave Koz - "Nothing But the Radio On" (1991)
- Rod Stewart - "Broken Arrow" (1991)
- Santana - "Somewhere in Heaven" (1992)
- Santana - "Right On" (1992) (with Larry Graham)
- Richard Marx - "Chains Around My Heart" (1992)
- Portrait - "Here We Go Again!" (1992)
- The O'Jays - "Emotionally Yours" (1991)
- Clint Black & Wynonna Judd - "A Bad Goodbye" (1993)

== Tracks ==
- Angels All Around Us (Introduction)
- Viva la Vida (Life Is For Living)
- Esperando
- No One to Depend On
- Black Magic Woman/Gypsy Queen
- Oye Como Va
- Samba Pa Ti
- Guajira
- Make Somebody Happy
- Toussaint l'Overture
- Soul Sacrifice/Don't Try This at Home
- Europa (Earth's Cry Heaven's Smile)
- Jin-Go-Lo-Ba

== Santana lineup ==
- Jorge Santana: guitar
- Walfredo Reyes: percussion, drums
- Myron Dove: bass, background vocals
- Alex Ligertwood: vocals, background vocals
- Karl Perazzo: conga, timbales, vocals, background vocals
- Raul Rekow: percussion, conga, background vocals
- Chester Thompson: keyboards, background vocals
- Carlos Santana: guitar, percussion, vocals, background vocals
- Vorriece Cooper: vocals, background vocals

== Awards ==
- Gold Lion Awards: Cannes International Advertising Festival - 1997 for Harley Davidson "Birds", 2009 Cannes Advertising Festival - Chambers Hotel "Video Art Piece"
