= They Only Come Out at Night (Peter Brown song) =

Single by Peter Brown

from the album Snap
- B-side: "They Only Come Out At Night (Instrumental)"
- Released: 11 February 1984; 21 June 1984 (Japan)
- Genre: Synth-funk; post-disco; Hi-NRG
- Length: 4:05 (7" version); 4:23 (single version); 4:50 (instrumental version); 5:07 (album version); 6:15 (12" version)
- Label: CBS Columbia
- Songwriter(s): Peter Brown; Robert Vavrik
- Producer(s): Peter Brown John "Jellybean" Benitez

Peter Brown singles chronology
"(Love Is Just) The Game" (1984)	"They Only Come Out at Night" (1984)	"Zie Zie Won't Dance" (1984)

"They Only Come Out at Night" is a 1984 dance single by Peter Brown. The single was his first number one on the dance chart, where it stayed for one week. "They Only Come Out at Night", also peaked at number 50 on the soul singles chart, but unlike previous Peter Brown entries, it did not make the Billboard Hot 100. It did, however, reach No. 102 on the Billboard Bubbling Under the Hot 100 chart.

== Personnel ==
Credits are adapted from the album's liner notes.

- Pat Hurley, Robert Rans – Backing Vocals
- John "Jellybean" Benitez – Mixed
- Melanie West – Engineer Assistant
- Michael Hutchinson – Remix

== Formats and track listings ==
=== 12" Columbia – 44-04957 (US) ===
1. "They Only Come Out At Night" – 6:15
2. "They Only Come Out At Night (Instrumental)" – 4:46

=== 7" Columbia – 38-04981 (US) ===
1. "They Only Come Out At Night" – 4:05
2. " They Only Come Out At Night (Instrumental)" – 4:50

=== 7" CBS – CBSA 4334, CBS – A 4334 (Europe) ===
1. "They Only Come Out At Night" – 4:23
2. "They Only Come Out At Night (Instrumental)" – 4:50

=== 7" CBS – Sony Records – 07SP 807 (Japan) ===
1. "They Only Come Out At Night" – 4:05
2. "They Only Come Out At Night (Instrumental)" – 4:50

== Charts ==
Chart (1984)	Peak position
US Billboard Bubbling Under Hot 100 Singles	102
US Billboard Hot R&B/Hip-Hop Songs	50
US Hot Dance Music/Club Play	1
