= Honey I'm Home (album) =

Studio album by Al B. Sure!
- Released: June 23, 2009
- Recorded: 2008–2009
- Genre: R&B
- Length: 51:40
- Label: Hidden Beach; Universal
- Producer: Sherrod Barnes; Kevin Deane; Terence Dudley; Andreao Heard; Mike Mani; Maurice Pearl; Al B. Sure (also exec.); Kyle West

Al B. Sure! chronology
Sexy Versus (1992)	Honey I'm Home (2009)

Singles from Honey I'm Home
- 1. "I Love It! (Papi Aye, Aye, Aye)" Released: May 30, 2009

Professional ratings
Review scores
Source	Rating
Allmusic	3/5 stars

Honey I'm Home is the fourth studio album by Al B. Sure!, released on June 23, 2009 by Hidden Beach Recordings. It's his first release of new material since 1992's Sexy Versus.

Lead single "I Love It! (Papi Aye, Aye, Aye)" received moderate R&B airplay, returning Brown to the Billboard Adult R&B Charts for the first time in 15 years.

== Track listing ==
1. "Nite & Day (Interlude)" (Al B. Sure!, Kyle West) – 0:11
2. "I Love It! (Papi Aye, Aye, Aye)" (Al B. Sure!, Kyle West) – 4:44
3. "I'm Glad" (Andreao Heard, Sherrod Barnes) – 4:33
4. "Top of Your Lungs!" – 3:57
5. "All I Wanna Do (...Is Make It Hot for You)" (Al B. Sure!, VI, Kevin Deane) – 4:13
6. "Lady in My Life" (Rod Temperton) – 5:10
7. "Dedicate My All" (Al B. Sure!, Kyle West) – 4:39
8. "By the Way, By the Way" (Al B. Sure!, Kyle West) – 4:09
9. "Only You!" (Ernie Isley, Marvin Isley, Ronald Isley, Rudolph Isley, Maurice Pearl, Al B. Sure!) – 3:30
10. "Whatcha Got?" (Al B. Sure!, Terence Dudley) – 4:12
11. "Fragile" (Sting) – 3:26
12. "4 Life!" (Stevie Wonder, Al B. Sure!, Kyle West) – 4:42
13. "Never Stop Loving You" (Al B. Sure!, Mike Mani) – 4:14

== Charts ==
=== Album ===
Chart (2009)	Peak position
US Billboard 200	85
US Top R&B/Hip-Hop Albums (Billboard)	16

Weekly chart performance for "I Love It! (Papi Aye, Aye, Aye)"
Chart (2009)	Peak position
US Hot R&B/Hip-Hop Songs (Billboard)	72
US Adult R&B Songs (Billboard)	22
