= Missunderstanding =

Single by Al B. Sure!

from the album Private Times...and the Whole 9!
- Released: November 1990
- Recorded: 1989, 1990 Remix
- Genre: New jack swing; R&B; hip hop
- Length: 4:30
- Label: Uptown, Warner Bros.
- Songwriters: Al B. Sure!, Edward "Eddie F" Ferrell, Nevelle Hodge
- Producers: Al B. Sure!, Eddie F., Nevelle Hodge, DeVante Swing

Al B. Sure! singles chronology
"If I'm Not Your Lover" (1989)	"Missunderstanding" (1990)	"No Matter What You Do" (1991)

"Missunderstanding" is a number-one R&B single by Al B. Sure!. Taken from Sure!'s second album Private Times...and the Whole 9!, it spent a week at number one on the US R&B chart and peaked at number forty-two on the Billboard Hot 100. The video was directed by David Kellogg, and filmed at Universal Studios.

== Charts ==
Chart (1990)	Peak position
US Billboard Hot 100	42
US Hot R&B/Hip-Hop Singles & Tracks (Billboard)	1
US Cash Box Top 100	41

== See also ==
- List of Hot R&B Singles number ones of 1990
