= Peter Brown (singer) =

American singer (born 1953)

- Born: July 11, 1953 (age 73); Blue Island, Illinois, U.S.
- Genres: Electronic, disco, post-disco, funk
- Occupations: Singer, songwriter, record producer
- Instruments: Vocals, keyboards, percussion

Peter Brown (born July 11, 1953) is an American singer-songwriter and record producer. Brown was a popular performer in the late 1970s and early 1980s. His biggest success was the release of the LP in 1977 called A Fantasy Love Affair which produced the disco hits "Do Ya Wanna Get Funky with Me" and "Dance With Me". He wrote, with Robert Rans, Madonna's hit "Material Girl".

== Early life ==
Brown was born on July 11, 1953 in Blue Island, Illinois, and raised in Palos Heights, Illinois, both suburbs of Chicago, United States. His mother, Virginia, was artistic and musically talented and gave Peter music lessons at a young age. Peter's father, Maurice, was an electronic engineer whose electronics helped Peter learn the technical aspects of recording music. He always brought home the latest technological breakthrough, which in those days included CB and ham radios, the first color television and the first stereo record player.

Maurice also purchased a number of tape recorders, which Peter played with as a child. One of these machines, a TEAC A-1200 two-track, had a feature which allowed transferring recordings on one track to a second track, while simultaneously allowing recording something new on that second track.

== Early career ==
Brown became serious about music in his teens and chose to learn the drums. His greatest inspirations in music at the time were Santana; Earth, Wind and Fire; and Chicago. He later became proficient playing timbales, conga drums, and a large number of other percussion instruments. Later, Brown was one of the pioneer users of the musical synthesizer, and for a time he was spokesman for the ARP Synthesizer company, since he used their products almost exclusively in performances and recordings.

As a young man, Brown wanted to become a painter or a graphic artist. After High School he enrolled in The School of the Art Institute of Chicago.

Brown met Cory Wade, who eventually became his first producer. Wade encouraged Brown to give him some demo tracks for critique. At this point, Brown could use his four-track recorder and his then-innovative synthesizer. Brown subsequently changed his career to music, but thought of being a songwriter, studio musician, or producer. However, Wade suggested that Brown become a producer. Brown assembled a group of musicians to perform his music, inspiring them with stories of his connections with Wade. Among the original members of the band was Pat Hurley, who sang and played keyboard in the band and who eventually co-wrote lyrics with Brown. Tom Dziallo played bass and guitar on all of Brown's albums, and Robert Rans became Brown's lead keyboard player and primary lyric writing partner for many years. Brown's colleague, Robert Vavrik, didn't join the band but eventually penned some lyrics with him.

They created some disco music, which was popular at the time, and took the track to TK Records in Hialeah, Florida, for a possible record deal. Within days of the record having been sent, Henry Stone, the president of TK, wanted to release the song just as it was and offered Wade a deal for the single. This was followed by an album deal if the single became successful. Although tempted by the offer, Brown did not want his four-track, home made demo released as the actual record.

Henry Stone and TK Records liked the augmented version, so Brown and Stone made the album deal and settled on a six-month deadline to write new material and record the album. Brown also photographed the album's somewhat controversial cover and revealed, in a 1978 interview in Rolling Stone, that he had created the cover's nude model out of cardboard, sheer fabric and ribbons.

== Music career (1977–85) ==
Late in 1977, TK Records announced that sales of the 12-inch version of "Do Ya Wanna Get Funky With Me" had reached the million dollar mark, making it the first gold 12-inch single in history. The album went gold as well.

Billboard Magazine's Year End #1 Awards for 1978 named Brown the #1 new male album artist, #3 new album artist and #10 pop male artist, as well as #11 pop male album artist, #16 soul artists and #11 soul albums. Cash Box Magazine's Year End Awards issue for 1978 named Brown #1 Top Male Single Vocalist, #1 Top New Male Single Vocalist and #2 Top Male Album Vocalist along with #3 Crossover R&B Male.

The 1978 Record World Magazine Disco Awards named Brown Outstanding New Performer, Top New Male Vocalist and Top Male Vocalist. He was also nominated by NARAS (The National Academy of Recording Arts and Sciences) in 1978 for a Grammy Award for best R&B Vocal Performance for the song "Dance With Me". "Dance With Me" also included a guest vocal performance by Betty Wright. In 1979, Brown's single "Crank It Up" peaked in the Billboard Disco Chart at No. 4.

Brown's first professional performance came on the American Bandstand television show, hosted by Dick Clark. That year, Brown also took part in the filming of a television special to promote the upcoming movie Foul Play with Goldie Hawn and Chevy Chase. He also filmed a segment for the television show 60 Minutes showing the process of how a song is actually recorded in the recording studio. Later years saw him performing on the Mike Douglas Show, American Bandstand and as a presenter on the American Music Awards. On tour in 1978, Brown and his band (now with additional members Keith Anderson, drums, Joe Guzzo, guitar, Mike Hillinger, keyboards and Wildflower, background vocals) played venues as diverse as New York's The Bottom Line and Madison Square Garden.

On Brown's second album (recorded at Studio Center and Criteria Recording studios in North Miami, Florida), Stargazer, he was joined by Laura Taylor and Dan Hartman singing background vocals on the song "It's Alright."

In 1980, Brown released another charting dance song (#6 on Billboard's Dance Chart) called "Can't Be Love – Do It to Me Anyway", which was only released as a 12" single and never appeared on an album. The initial success of his career was soon overshadowed by legal disputes and the eventual bankruptcy of TK Records. After the dust cleared, he was able to sign a new record contract with RCA Records with the help of a new management team, Wiesner/DeMann Entertainment. The 1983 album was called Back to the Front, and was produced by Brown with executive producer Bob Gaudio (The Four Seasons) and recorded at Gaudio/Valli Recording Studios in Hollywood, California. Featured are musical guests Michael Brecker (saxophone) and Michael Boddicker (synthesizers). From this album, the song "Baby Gets High" reached #104 U.S. Billboard and #6 on Billboard's Disco Chart. Brown remained with Freddy DeMann after he started a solo management company whose clients included Madonna and Michael Jackson.

In 1984, Brown co-wrote "Material Girl", which became one of Madonna's biggest hits and signature song. It also made Brown's music publishing company, Minong Publishing one of the year's top music publishers.

Brown also wrote a song for Agnetha Fältskog, "Maybe It Was Magic". Peter Cetera from the group Chicago was producing her solo album I Stand Alone and liked the song. Brown also wrote "East Meets West" for the Japanese group Sandii & the Sunsetz. Brown's final hit was "They Only Come Out at Night" which hit the number one slot on Billboard magazine's Dance Chart in April 1984. Brown's fourth and final album Snap was recorded at Pumpkin Recording Studios in Oak Lawn, Illinois, owned by Gary Loizzo, who was a former member of The American Breed and sang their hit "Bend Me Shape Me" in 1968. This album contained the song "Zie Zie Won't Dance" which spawned Brown's music video of the same name. The video, filmed in London, was nominated for best video (special effects, art direction and editing) along with videos by Madonna and Bruce Springsteen at the second MTV Music Video Awards in 1985.

In the late 1980s, a severe case of tinnitus prompted Brown to quit the music business in an attempt to preserve his damaged hearing. He began a design company which headed the award-winning redesign of the Chicago Board Options Exchange Internet site, among other wide-ranging design and architectural projects.

In late June 2018, Brown released his fifth album, Boom, his first album release in over 30 years. It features 11 tracks of his signature dance/R&B sound. Singles include "Boom", the a cappella title track, "Dancing All Alone", and "Drama Queen". Boom was written, performed, arranged, recorded, and mixed entirely by Brown on an iMac computer using only Auratone speakers and a Sennheiser MD 441U microphone.

== Discography ==
=== Albums ===
Year	Album	Peak chart positions	
Year	Album	US	AUS
1978	A Fantasy Love Affair	11	50
1979	Stargazer	—	—
1983	Back to the Front	—	—
1984	Snap	—	—
2018	Boom	—	—
"—" denotes a recording that did not chart.

=== Compilation albums ===
- 1998 – Get Funky with Me: The Best of the TK Years

== Singles ==
Year	Title	Peak chart positions						
Year	Title	US Pop	US R&B	US Dance	CAN	CAN Dance	AUS	UK
1977	"Fantasy Love Affair"	―	―	―	―	―	―	―
1977	"Do Ya Wanna Get Funky with Me"	18	3	9	―	―	69	43
1977	"Dance with Me"	8	5	4	9	19	52	57
1978	"You Should Do It"	54	25	―	93	―	―	―
1979	"Crank It Up (Funk Town)"	86	9	4	68	11	―	―
1979	"Stargazer"	59	―	―	―	―	―	―
1979	"Love in Our Hearts"	―	―	65	―	―	―	―
1980	"Can't Be Love - Do It to Me Anyway"	―	74	6	―	―	―	―
1982	"Baby Gets High"	104	49	6	―	―	―	―
1983	"Overnight Sensation"	―	―	55	―	―	―	―
1984	"(Love Is Just) The Game"	―	―	2	―	―	―	―
1984	"They Only Come Out at Night"	102	50	1	―	―	―	―
1984	"Zie Zie Won't Dance"	108	―	20	―	―	―	―
"—" denotes releases that did not chart or were not released in that territory.

== See also ==
- List of Billboard number-one dance club songs
- List of artists who reached number one on the U.S. Dance Club Songs chart
