= Cory Wade (music producer) =

Cory Wade (born May 6, 1936) is a former record producer, director of A&R, songwriter, publisher, and recording studio manager. He has produced more than 35 gold and platinum records from 1973 to 1982 and has won numerous music industry awards, a Grammy Award nomination, and two American Music Award nominations.

== Early life and career ==
Wade was born in Indianapolis, Indiana, United States. He is best known for producing various hits within the disco genre in the 1970s and 1980s. As producer for TK Records, Wade produced the 1977 single "Do Ya Wanna Get Funky with Me," by Peter Brown, which became the first 12-inch single to sell a million copies.

As a record producer, Wade has covered music in many fields such as disco, pop, R&B, funk, Christian, rock, and multiple instrumentals, including "Disco Magic" by T-Connection.

== Achievements ==
Cory Wade also produced hit recordings for Foxy, including "Get Off", which sold more than a million 12-inch and album copies. T-Connection also sold into the millions with a number of their disco-funk singles and albums. Wade also produced a hit album for local artists, Tiger, two brothers and their group, who came from the Florida Everglades-based Miccosukee Native American Tribe. He worked with other TK artists such as George and Gwen McCrae, Betty Wright, Wildflower, Timmy Thomas, Funk Machine, KC and the Sunshine Band, Steve Gordon, and Aaron Dey. Wade produced over 100 top-selling records. Notably, his first gold record came from the newly formed 20th Century Fox Records in 1972, when he produced the Brighter Side of Darkness track "Love Jones".
