= Al B. Sure! =

American singer (born 1968)

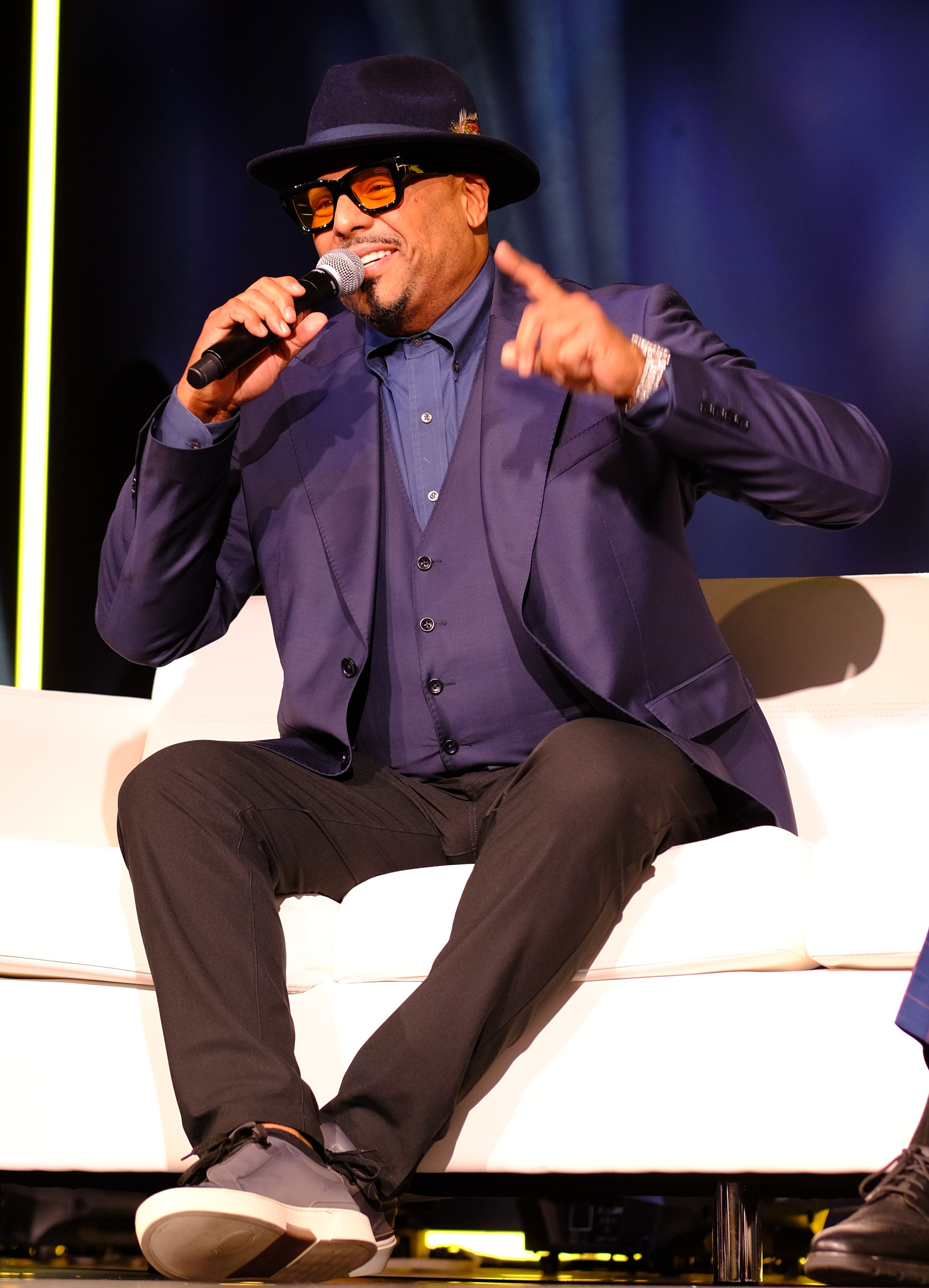
- Al B. Sure! speaking at Essence Festival 2025's Global Black Economic Forum

Background information
- Born: Albert Joseph Brown III; June 4, 1968 (age 58); Boston, Massachusetts, U.S.
- Origin: Mount Vernon, New York, U.S.
- Genres: R&B; new jack swing; hip hop; urban
- Occupations: Singer; songwriter; rapper; record producer; radio presenter
- Years active: 1986–present
- Labels: Uptown; Warner Bros.; Hidden Beach
- Website: albsure.net

Albert Joseph Brown III (born June 4, 1968), known professionally as Al B. Sure!, is an American singer, songwriter, record producer, radio host and former record executive. He was born in Boston and raised in Mount Vernon, New York. During the late 1980s and early 1990s, Brown was one of new jack swing's most popular performers.

== Early life and music career ==
Brown is the son of Albert Joseph Brown II, a nuclear medicine technologist, and Cassandra Brown, an accountant. Brown was a star football quarterback at Mount Vernon High School in New York, who rejected an athletic scholarship to the University of Iowa to pursue a music career. In 1987, Quincy Jones selected Brown as the first winner of the Sony Innovators Talent Search. He went on to work with Jones on several projects, most notably the platinum 1990 single "The Secret Garden (Sweet Seduction Suite)" from Jones' double-platinum-certified album Back on the Block. On this recording, Brown was one of a quartet with Barry White, El DeBarge, and James Ingram.

Brown's 1988 debut album In Effect Mode sold more than three million copies, topping the Billboard R&B chart for seven straight weeks. It included the single "Nite and Day", which topped the R&B chart and reached No. 7 on the Billboard Hot 100, and "Off on Your Own (Girl)", which also topped the R&B chart. He received numerous Grammy and American Music Award (AMA) nominations, and won an AMA for Best New R&B Artist. He also received several Soul Train Award nominations, and won the award for Best New Artist. Brown also won several New York Music Awards. In addition, his 1-900 phone line was third in generating revenue, following those for New Kids on the Block and Run-D.M.C.

As a writer and producer, Brown helped introduce to the music industry such multi-platinum acts as Jodeci and teen R&B performer Tevin Campbell (who was also one of Prince's and Quincy Jones' former protégés), as well as Faith Evans, Dave Hollister, Case.

In 2009, Brown signed with Hidden Beach Recordings. His first single for the label, "I Love It (Papi Aye, Aye, Aye)," entered the Radio & Records Urban AC chart at No. 33. The album Honey, I'm Home was released on June 23, 2009.

== Other work ==
In 1991, Brown co-starred with Martin Lawrence in a television pilot titled Private Times.

In 1993, Brown provided vocals to the title track of the David Bowie album Black Tie White Noise. He performed the song live with Bowie on The Tonight Show the same year.

In 2000, Brown's ABS Entertainment launched a television development division, and he served as co-executive producer of an HBO Comedy Special starring Jamie Foxx, filmed at the Paramount Theater in Oakland, California. Then, Brown teamed with the ABC Radio Network to produce and host a romantically themed nighttime music program, The Secret Garden, featuring a blend of music and celebrity guests.

Brown participated in Bless the Children Foundation's celebrity auction along with NFL stars Charles Woodson and Anthony Dorsett. He was presented with the key to the city of Oakland by city council member Laurence E. Reid in recognition of the participation of Brown's ABS Ken-Struk-Shen in refurbishing parts of the city. Reid proclaimed October 19 Al B. Sure! Day. Brown was a DJ on the Los Angeles radio station KHHT, and played old-school hip hop and R&B. He currently hosts a daily morning-radio show on iHeart Radio.

In July 2019, Brown became the new host of Urban One's nationally syndicated evening quiet storm/slow jams program Love and R&B, replacing the previous host, John Monds. The show, syndicated through Urban One subsidiary Reach Media and based in Dallas, Texas, is heard on urban adult contemporary format radio stations such as WZAK in Cleveland, WMMJ in Washington, and WDMK in Detroit among others.

In 2010, Brown appeared as one of the 12 contestants on the TV One reality television dating game show The Ultimate Merger. The series was produced by Donald Trump and starred former Apprentice contestant Omarosa Manigault-Stallworth, whom Brown dated previously.

In 2023, Brown and Al Sharpton founded a health equity organization called Health Equity in Transplantation following a March decision made by a private Medicare administrative contractor on behalf of the Centers for Medicare and Medicaid Coverage (CMS). The organization seeks to support underserved communities by supporting blood testing for early detection of organ rejection. Brown serves as the Executive Chairman.

Brown was featured in the Peacock documentary Diddy: The Making of a Bad Boy, which was his first time speaking on camera about Kim Porter's death and relationship with Sean "Diddy" Combs.

== Personal life ==
Al B. Sure! has three sons. His eldest son Albert Joseph Brown IV, as Al B. Sure! Jr, was featured on the MTV series Rock the Cradle. His second son Devin Brown is an R&B singer who goes by the name of Devin LOUD. While publicly dating Niki Haris in 1991, he had a son by Kim Porter, Quincy Brown, who was later allegedly adopted by mogul music producer Sean "P Diddy" Combs. In that same year, he co-wrote a song called "Forever My Lady", inspired by Kim and his son. The song was performed by Jodeci and produced by Al B. Sure! and Jodeci-member DeVante Swing. He then started a relationship with singer Karyn White in 2012.

In 2022, it was revealed that Al had suffered from multiple illnesses including renal failure. He eventually was intubated and fell into a coma. He received a liver transplant, and has been recovering since 2023.

== Discography ==
=== Studio albums ===
Year	Album details	Peak chart positions		Certifications
Year	Album details	US	US R&B	Certifications
1988	In Effect Mode: Released: May 3, 1988; Label: Warner Bros.	20	1	RIAA: 2× Platinum
1990	Private Times...and the Whole 9!: Released: October 16, 1990; Label: Warner Bros.	20	4	RIAA: Gold
1992	Sexy Versus: Released: September 22, 1992; Label: Warner Bros.	41	2	
2009	Honey I'm Home: Released: June 23, 2009; Label: Hidden Beach	85	16	

=== Compilation albums ===
Year	Album details
2003	The Very Best of Al B. Sure!: Released: May 27, 2003; Label: Warner Bros., Rhino

=== Singles ===
Year	Single	Peak chart positions							Album
Year	Single	US	US R&B	US A/C	US Dan	NLD	NZ	UK	Album
1988	"Nite and Day"	7	1	19	—	71	—	44	In Effect Mode
1988	"Off on Your Own (Girl)"	45	1	—	25	—	—	70	In Effect Mode
1988	"Rescue Me"	—	3	—	—	—	—	—	In Effect Mode
1988	"Killing Me Softly"	80	14	—	—	—	—	—	In Effect Mode
1989	"If I'm Not Your Lover" (featuring Slick Rick)	—	2	—	—	—	—	54	In Effect Mode
1990	"Missunderstanding"	42	1	—	—	—	30	—	Private Times... and the Whole 9!
1991	"No Matter What You Do" (with Diana Ross)	—	4	—	—	—	—	—	Private Times... and the Whole 9!
1991	"Had Enuf?"	—	28	—	—	—	—	—	Private Times... and the Whole 9!
1992	"Right Now"	47	1	—	—	—	—	—	Sexy Versus
1992	"Natalie"	—	56	—	—	—	—	—	Sexy Versus
1993	"I Don't Wanna Cry"	—	83	—	—	—	—	—	Sexy Versus
1994	"I'm Still in Love with You"	—	9	—	—	—	—	—	Above the Rim
2009	"I Love It (Papi Aye Aye Aye)"	—	72	—	—	—	—	—	Honey I'm Home
"—" denotes a recording that did not chart or was not released in that territory.

=== Featured singles ===
Year	Title	Artist	Peak chart positions					Album
Year	Title	Artist	US	US R&B	US A/C	NLD	UK	Album
1990	"The Secret Garden (Sweet Seduction Suite)"	Quincy Jones w/ James Ingram; El DeBarge; Barry White	31	1	26	13	67	Back on the Block
1993	"Black Tie White Noise"	David Bowie	—	—	—	—	36	Black Tie White Noise
"—" denotes a recording that did not chart or was not released in that territory.

=== Writing and producing credits ===
Year	Song	Artist	Credit
1991	Forever My Lady	Jodeci	Writer & producer
1991	Come and Talk to Me	Jodeci	Writer & producer
1992	Alone With You	Tevin Campbell	Writer & producer
1992	"Confused"	Tevin Campbell	Writer
1996	Loungin	LL Cool J	Writer
