= Billboard Year-End Hot R&B Singles of 1994 =

American music chart

This is a list of Billboard magazine's Top Hot R&B Singles of 1994.

No.	Title	Artist(s)
1	"Bump n' Grind"	R. Kelly
2	"Back & Forth"	Aaliyah
3	"I'll Make Love to You"	Boyz II Men
4	"Can We Talk"	Tevin Campbell
5	"Cry for You"	Jodeci
6	"I Miss You"	Aaron Hall
7	"Any Time, Any Place" / "And On and On"	Janet Jackson
8	"Never Keeping Secrets"	Babyface
9	"Your Body's Callin'"	R. Kelly
10	"U Send Me Swingin'"	Mint Condition
11	"Stroke You Up"	Changing Faces
12	"I'm Ready"	Tevin Campbell
13	"Willing to Forgive"	Aretha Franklin
14	"Funkdafied"	Da Brat
15	"You Mean the World to Me"	Toni Braxton
16	"Anything"	SWV
17	"The Most Beautiful Girl in the World"	Prince
18	"Sending My Love"	Zhané
19	"Understanding"	Xscape
20	"Groove Thang"	Zhané
21	"The Right Kinda Lover"	Patti LaBelle
22	"Got Me Waiting"	Heavy D & the Boyz
23	"(At Your Best) You Are Love"	Aaliyah
24	"I Wanna Be Down"	Brandy
25	"Feenin'"	Jodeci
26	"Gangsta Lean"	DRS
27	"Breathe Again"	Toni Braxton
28	"Body and Soul"	Anita Baker
29	"When Can I See You"	Babyface
30	"Getto Jam"	Domino
31	"Never Lie"	Immature
32	"I'm Not Over You"	CeCe Peniston
33	"Flava in Ya Ear"	Craig Mack
34	"Believe in Love"	Teddy Pendergrass
35	"(Lay Your Head on My) Pillow"	Tony! Toni! Toné!
36	"Whatta Man"	Salt-N-Pepa featuring En Vogue
37	"Shoop"	Salt-N-Pepa
38	"Tootsee Roll"	69 Boyz
39	"I'd Give Anything"	Gerald Levert
40	"Regulate"	Warren G and Nate Dogg
41	"Always in My Heart"	Tevin Campbell
42	"I'm in the Mood"	CeCe Peniston
43	"Treat U Rite"	Angela Winbush
44	"Hero"	Mariah Carey
45	"Here Comes the Hotstepper"	Ini Kamoze
46	"Just Kickin' It"	Xscape
47	"You're Always on My Mind"	SWV
48	"Practice What You Preach"	Barry White
49	"Never Should've Let You Go"	Hi-Five
50	"U.N.I.T.Y."	Queen Latifah
51	"Time and Chance"	Color Me Badd
52	"How Do You Like It?"	Keith Sweat
53	"Keep Ya Head Up"	2Pac
54	"Sex Me"	R. Kelly
55	"You Don't Have to Worry"	Mary J. Blige
56	"Do You Wanna Get Funky"	C+C Music Factory
57	"And Our Feelings"	Babyface
58	"I Swear"	All-4-One
59	"Stay"	Eternal
60	"Because of Love"	Janet Jackson
61	"Never Forget You" / "Without You"	Mariah Carey
62	"Booti Call"	Blackstreet
63	"Fantastic Voyage"	Coolio
64	"Player's Ball"	Outkast
65	"I Believe"	Sounds of Blackness
66	"So Much in Love"	All-4-One
67	"90's Girl"	BlackGirl
68	"Come Inside"	Intro
69	"U Will Know"	Black Men United
70	"Part Time Lover" / "I'm Still in Love with You"	H-Town / Al B. Sure!
71	"Dunkie Butt (Please Please Please)"	12 Gauge
72	"Can U Get wit It"	Usher
73	"Gin and Juice"	Snoop Doggy Dogg
74	"Love on My Mind"	Xscape
75	"What's My Name?"	Snoop Doggy Dogg
76	"Old Time's Sake"	Sweet Sable
77	"Ribbon in the Sky"	Intro
78	"Nuttin' but Love"	Heavy D & the Boyz
79	"When a Man Loves a Woman"	Jody Watley
80	"Anniversary"	Tony! Toni! Toné!
81	"This D.J."	Warren G
82	"Your Love is a 187"	Whitehead Bros.
83	"Gonna Love You Right"	After 7
84	"What About Us"	Jodeci
85	"Before I Let You Go"	Blackstreet
86	"Betcha'll Never Find"	Chantay Savage
87	"The Morning After"	Maze
88	"Endless Love"	Luther Vandross and Mariah Carey
89	"Comin' On Strong"	Sudden Change
90	"Worker Man"	Patra
91	"Pumps and a Bump"	Hammer
92	"Back in the Day"	Ahmad
93	"Juicy" / "Unbelivable"	The Notorious B.I.G.
94	"Letitgo"	Prince
95	"Sweet Potatoe Pie"	Domino
96	"Again"	Janet Jackson
97	"I Belong to You" / "How Many Ways"	Toni Braxton
98	"You Know How We Do It"	Ice Cube
99	"Dream On Dreamer"	The Brand New Heavies
100	"My Love"	Mary J. Blige

== See also ==
- 1994 in music
- Billboard Year-End Hot 100 singles of 1994
- Billboard Year-End Hot Rap Singles of 1994
- List of number-one R&B singles of 1994 (U.S.)
