= Billboard Year-End Hot 100 singles of 1994 =

Ranking of recorded music

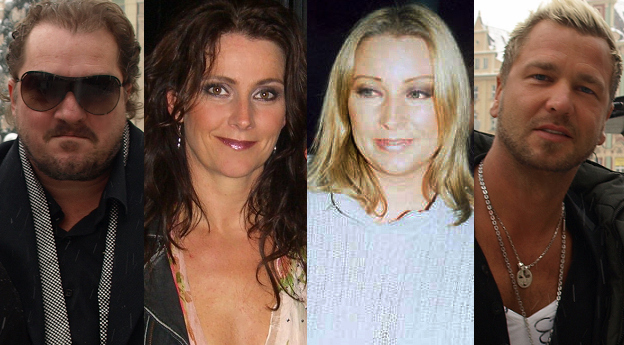
Ace of Base's album The Sign had three songs in the top ten: "The Sign", "All That She Wants", and "Don't Turn Around". The last time an album had such a strong showing was in 1978, when Bee Gees recordings from the Saturday Night Fever soundtrack were in positions 2, 4, and 6.

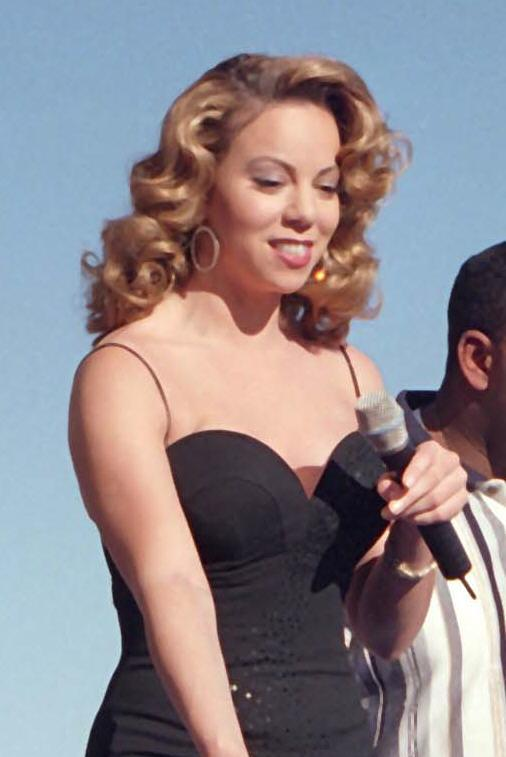
Mariah Carey had the most songs on the year-end chart with four: "Hero" (number 5), "Without You" (number 16), "Anytime You Need a Friend" (number 47), and "Endless Love" (number 56), a duet with Luther Vandross.

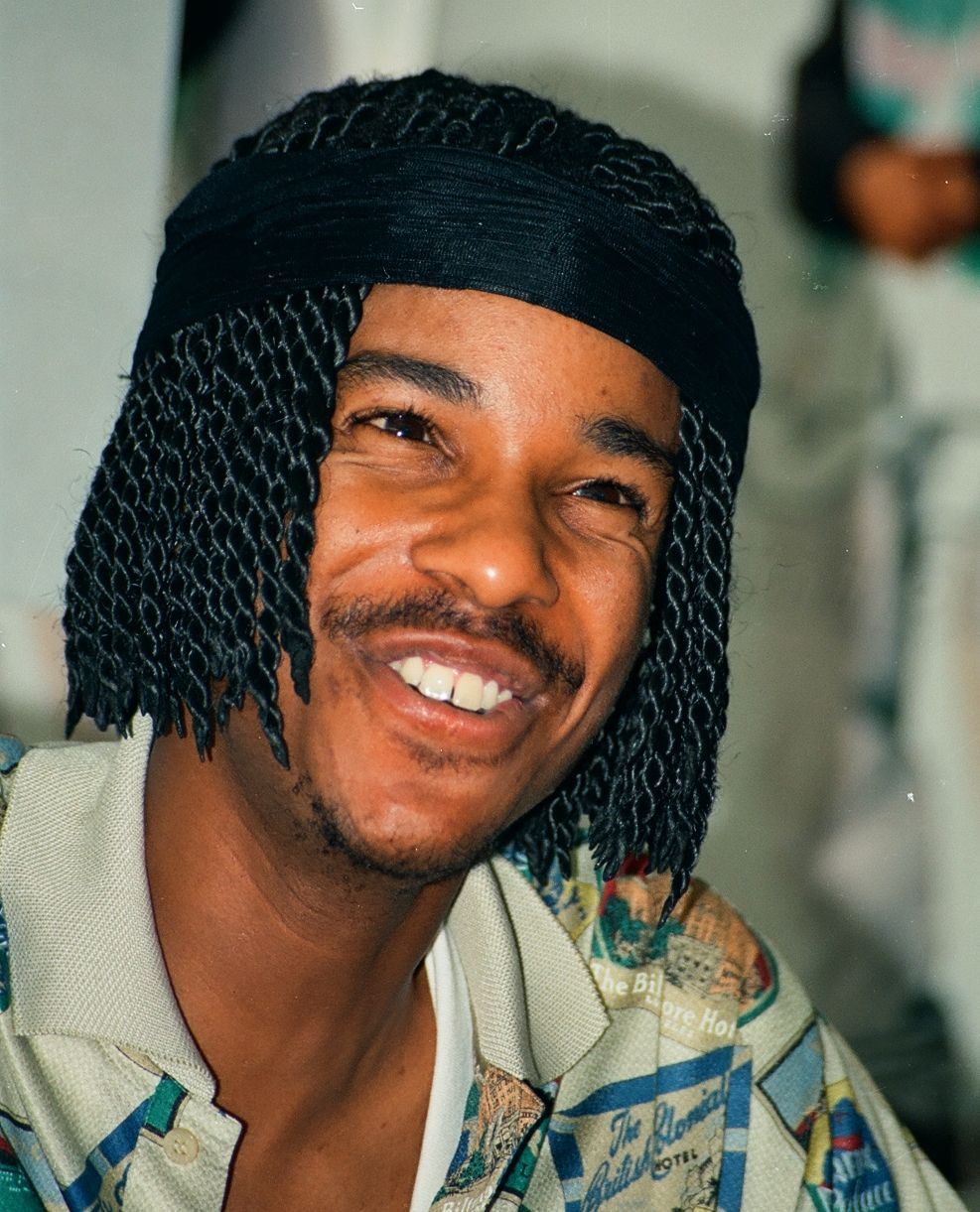
Tevin Campbell charted with the three songs "Can We Talk", "I'm Ready", and "Always in My Heart" on 1995's year-end chart.

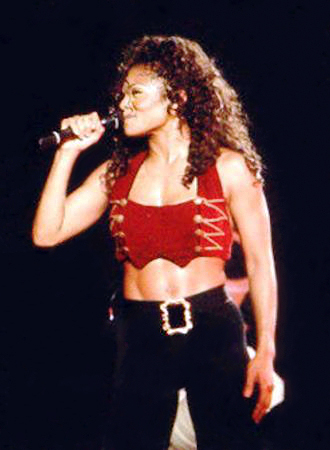
Janet Jackson's year-end charting songs "Again" (number 12), "Any Time, Any Place" (number 30), and "Because of Love" (number 48) all appeared on her 1993 album Janet.

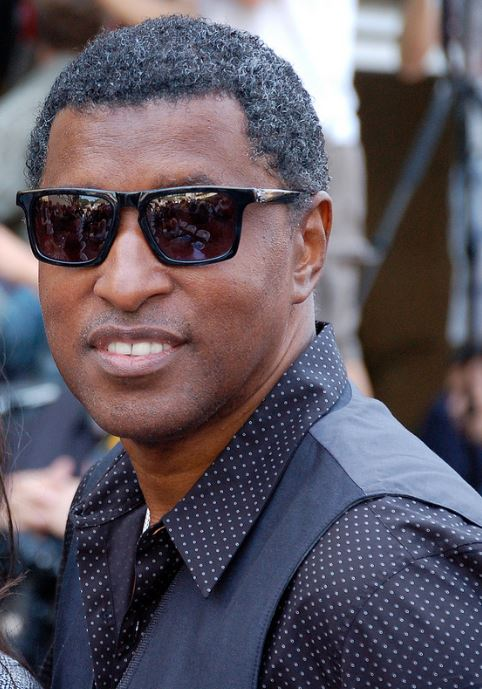
Babyface (pictured in 2013) had three songs on the Year-End Hot 100: "When Can I See You", "Never Keeping Secrets", and "And Our Feelings".

This is a list of Billboard magazine's Top Hot 100 songs of 1994.

№	Title	Artist(s)
1	"The Sign"	Ace of Base
2	"I Swear"	All-4-One
3	"I'll Make Love to You"	Boyz II Men
4	"The Power of Love"	Celine Dion
5	"Hero"	Mariah Carey
6	"Stay (I Missed You)"	Lisa Loeb and Nine Stories
7	"Breathe Again"	Toni Braxton
8	"All for Love"	Bryan Adams, Rod Stewart and Sting
9	"All That She Wants"	Ace of Base
10	"Don't Turn Around"	Ace of Base
11	"Bump n' Grind"	R. Kelly
12	"Again"	Janet Jackson
13	"I'll Remember"	Madonna
14	"Whatta Man"	Salt-n-Pepa featuring En Vogue
15	"Wild Night"	John Mellencamp with Meshell Ndegeocello
16	"Without You" / "Never Forget You"	Mariah Carey
17	"You Mean the World to Me"	Toni Braxton
18	"Can You Feel the Love Tonight"	Elton John
19	"The Most Beautiful Girl in the World"	Prince
20	"Fantastic Voyage"	Coolio
21	"Baby, I Love Your Way"	Big Mountain
22	"Regulate"	Warren G and Nate Dogg
23	"If You Go"	Jon Secada
24	"Back & Forth"	Aaliyah
25	"Now and Forever"	Richard Marx
26	"When Can I See You"	Babyface
27	"Please Forgive Me"	Bryan Adams
28	"So Much in Love"	All-4-One
29	"Shoop"	Salt-n-Pepa
30	"Any Time, Any Place" / "And On and On"	Janet Jackson
31	"Shine"	Collective Soul
32	"Said I Loved You...But I Lied"	Michael Bolton
33	"Return to Innocence"	Enigma
34	"All I Wanna Do"	Sheryl Crow
35	"Mmm Mmm Mmm Mmm"	Crash Test Dummies
36	"Can We Talk"	Tevin Campbell
37	"Funkdafied"	Da Brat
38	"I'd Do Anything for Love (But I Won't Do That)"	Meat Loaf
39	"Gangsta Lean"	DRS
40	"Because the Night"	10,000 Maniacs
41	"Cantaloop (Flip Fantasia)"	Us3
42	"Whoomp! (There It Is)"	Tag Team
43	"Come to My Window"	Melissa Etheridge
44	"Stroke You Up"	Changing Faces
45	"I'm Ready"	Tevin Campbell
46	"100% Pure Love"	Crystal Waters
47	"Anytime You Need a Friend"	Mariah Carey
48	"Because of Love"	Janet Jackson
49	"Linger"	The Cranberries
50	"Loser"	Beck
51	"Found Out About You"	Gin Blossoms
52	"Gin and Juice"	Snoop Doggy Dogg
53	"Never Lie"	Immature
54	"Streets of Philadelphia"	Bruce Springsteen
55	"Getto Jam"	Domino
56	"Endless Love"	Luther Vandross & Mariah Carey
57	"I Miss You"	Aaron Hall
58	"Understanding"	Xscape
59	"This D.J."	Warren G
60	"Cry for You"	Jodeci
61	"Keep Ya Head Up"	2Pac
62	"What's My Name?"	Snoop Doggy Dogg
63	"Another Night"	Real McCoy
64	"Your Body's Callin'"	R. Kelly
65	"Tootsee Roll"	69 Boyz
66	"I Can See Clearly Now (from Cool Runnings)"	Jimmy Cliff
67	"Never Keeping Secrets"	Babyface
68	"Crazy"	Aerosmith
69	"Just Kickin' It"	Xscape
70	"(At Your Best) You Are Love"	Aaliyah
71	"Rock and Roll Dreams Come Through"	Meat Loaf
72	"Amazing"	Aerosmith
73	"Always"	Erasure
74	"Groove Thang"	Zhané
75	"Dreams"	Gabrielle
76	"Mr. Vain"	Culture Beat
77	"Mary Jane's Last Dance"	Tom Petty and the Heartbreakers
78	"Anything"	SWV
79	"Beautiful in My Eyes"	Joshua Kadison
80	"Stay"	Eternal
81	"Flava in Ya Ear"	Craig Mack
82	"U.N.I.T.Y."	Queen Latifah
83	"Prayer for the Dying"	Seal
84	"Secret"	Madonna
85	"Here Comes the Hotstepper"	Ini Kamoze
86	"Everyday"	Phil Collins
87	"Don't Take the Girl"	Tim McGraw
88	"Got Me Waiting"	Heavy D & the Boyz
89	"December, 1963 (Oh, What a Night)"	The Four Seasons
90	"Indian Outlaw"	Tim McGraw
91	"Always"	Bon Jovi
92	"I'm the Only One"	Melissa Etheridge
93	"Back in the Day"	Ahmad
94	"Love Sneakin' Up On You"	Bonnie Raitt
95	"I'll Take You There (from Threesome)"	General Public
96	"Always in My Heart"	Tevin Campbell
97	"What Is Love"	Haddaway
98	"And Our Feelings"	Babyface
99	"Bop Gun (One Nation)"	Ice Cube featuring George Clinton
100	"I Wanna Be Down"	Brandy

== See also ==
- 1994 in music
- Billboard Year-End Hot R&B Singles of 1994
- Billboard Year-End Hot Rap Singles of 1994
- List of Billboard Hot 100 number-one singles of 1994
- List of Billboard Hot 100 top-ten singles in 1994
