= Back to the World (Tevin Campbell album) =

Studio album by Tevin Campbell
- Released: June 18, 1996
- Recorded: August 1995 – March 1996
- Genre: R&B
- Length: 57:32
- Label: Qwest
- Producer: The Boom Brothers; Sean "Puffy" Combs; Keith Crouch; Derrick Edmondson; Jamey Jaz; Stevie J; Chucky Thompson

Tevin Campbell chronology
I'm Ready (1993)	Back to the World (1996)	Tevin Campbell (1999)

Singles from Back to the World
- 1. "Back to the World" Released: May 28, 1996; 2. "I Got It Bad" Released: August 12, 1996; 3. "Could You Learn to Love" Released: May 1997

Back to the World is the third studio album by American R&B singer Tevin Campbell. It was released by Qwest Records on June 18, 1996. Conceived after a period in which Campbell made fewer public appearances and focused on his private life, the album marked a shift toward a more urban sound, driven by a new lineup of collaborators, including Sean "Puffy" Combs and Keith Crouch. Now in his late teens, Campbell took more creative control, aiming for a personal record that marked his growth and maturity.

Critics complimented Campbell's vocal maturity and artistic growth on Back to the World, though some found the album's mellow tone occasionally repetitive. Commercially, the album failed to replicate the success of its two predecessors, reaching number 46 on the US Billboard 200 and number eleven on the Top R&B/Hip-Hop Albums chart only. The album's title track, its lead single, became a top ten hit in New Zealand though, and reached the top 20 of the US Hot R&B/Hip-Hop Songs chart.

== Background ==
In 1993, Tevin Campbell released his second studio album I'm Ready on Qwest Records, musician Quincy Jones' joint venture with Warner Bros. Records. The album was a major commercial success, selling over 1.7 million copies in the United States and earning double Platinum certification from the Recording Industry Association of America (RIAA). It featured the single "Can We Talk," Campbell's biggest hit since "Tell Me What You Want Me to Do" (1991), apart from three additional charting singles: "I'm Ready", "Always in My Heart" and "Don't Say Goodbye Girl". Released to critical acclaim, it was nominated for three Grammy Awards, including Best R&B Album. After the promotional activities for I'm Ready ended, Campbell temporarily withdrew from the public eye, though he appeared on several soundtracks and from 1993 to 1995, performed as an opening act on select dates during the summer of Janet Jackson's Janet World Tour. In between, he attended a prep school in Los Angeles and earned his highschool diploma, while going through a phase of introspective self-discovery and personal growth.

== Production ==
With contemporary R&B shifting more heavily toward hip hop, Warner Bros. arranged for Campbell to record his next project with a different roster of producers, including Sean "Puffy" Combs and Chucky Thompson and Stevie J from his Bad Boy team, as well as Keith Crouch, newcomer Jamey Jaz, and Anthony "A-Tone" Bryant and Langston Bryant from The Boom Brothers. Singer Prince who had contributed to his first two albums, did not work with Campbell again after 1993, when he became embroiled in a contractual dispute with Warner Bros. Babyface, who had produced most of the singles from I'm Ready, co-wrote on the tracks "Tell Me Where" and "Could You Learn to Love." Determined to create a much more personal album, Campbell took a more active role in shaping the album, from choosing the producers to helping craft the lyrics. Also serving as the album's executive producer, he co-wrote on several songs on the record. Now in his late teens, he wanted the album to reflect his coming of age and a clear progression from his previous release. While Campbell cited "Could It Be" as his favorite song on the album, the album was eventually titled after its opening track.

== Critical reception ==
Professional ratings
Review scores
Source	Rating
AllMusic	4/5 stars
The Buffalo News	3/5 stars
Entertainment Weekly	B+
Los Angeles Times	2.5/4 stars
Muzik	3/5 stars
Q	3/5 stars

AllMusic editor Leo Stanleyndi found that Back to the World "is proof positive that the teen idol is now a man [...] For the most part, he succeeds in establishing himself as a vocalist of prodigious talents and significant worth [..] No matter how Campbell tries to phase out that sweetness on Back to the World, he retains that appealing quality, which makes the album all the more endearing." Billboard's Paul Verna found that the song selection on Back to the World "suggests a more adult approach, despite several hip-hop tracks that give the mostly mellow set a trendy bounce. Credit is due to label's commitment to artist delevopment which is readily apparent on the project because of the performer's stronger delivery and continually evolving sound." Q magazine described the album as a "swinging soul cut to perfection and coolly delivered without the vocal historionics of Boyz II Men."

Vibe editor David Mills felt that with the album Campbell "maintains versatility, and also seems a lot more comfortable singing in his gutsier, sly-sounding lower register [...] This album is a robust statement about Tevin's vocal transformation, a shrewd departure from his first two [...] Back to the World isn't the yummy teen fluff I'm Ready was. Nor is it the delightful baby candy of his debut. This album is about growing up, its underlying vocal theme a bold quest for maturity." Carl Allen from The Buffalo News found that "sounding just short of adulthood is what makes Campbell's work so outstanding [...] This first compact disc since his stirring debut about three years ago is bound to again put him in contention with some of the big boys of popular music. He has the ability to enclose lyrics in a suspended tonal reality that has clarity as its major feature. The result is romantic music that can be understood immediately. Pretty effective stuff taken track by track. A little tedious all at once, except for true fans." Less impressed, Elysa Gardner from The Los Angeles Times found that the "main problem with Back to the World was that it lacked "good material. The teenager's still-developing voice is a technical marvel, lush and fluid, with a shimmering vibrato. But the songs offer little melodic panache."

== Commercial performance ==
Back to the World opened and peaked at number 46 on the US Billboard 200 and number eleven on the Top R&B/Hip-Hop Albums chart. Campbell's first effort to miss the top ten on the latter, it was considered a commercial disappointment compared to his first two albums T.E.V.I.N. (1991) and I'm Ready (1993). Campbell later expressed criticism of the album, describing it as a vanity-driven attempt to prove he could perform more mature material — an effort that, in retrospect, felt inauthentic and disconnected from his true artistic identity. In an interview with Billboard, he commented in June 1998: "I was never excited to listen to Back to the World; it was too much." In later interviews, he primarily blamed Warner Bros. for the album’s lackluster sales, arguing that after the departure of his early supporters Ray Harris and Hank Spann, the label was unsure how to handle a maturing former child star or position an R&B artist in an increasingly pop-dominated era.

== Track listing ==
Back to the World track listing
No.	Title	Writer(s)	Producer(s)	Length
1.	"Back to the World"	Jamey Jaz; Rahsaan Patterson; Mikelyn Roderick	Jaz	5:00
2.	"Dry Your Eyes"	Derrick Edmondson	Edmondson; Keith Crouch	4:44
3.	"You Don't Have to Worry"	Tevin Campbell; Sean Combs; Pamela Long; Kima Raynor; Keisha Spivey	Combs; Stevie J	5:40
4.	"I Got It Bad"	Campbell; Crouch; Kipper Jones	Crouch	5:04
5.	"Tell Me Where"	Babyface; The Boom Brothers	The Boom Brothers	4:29
6.	"Could It Be"	Jaz; Patterson; Donnell Spencer, Jr.; Roderick	Jaz	4:55
7.	"I Need You"	Campbell; Billy Nichols; The Boom Brothers	The Boom Brothers	3:56
8.	"I'll Be There"	Combs; Daron Jones; Marvin Scandrick; Michael Keith; Quiness Parker; Chucky Thompson	Combs; Thompson	4:46
9.	"We Can Work It Out"	Combs; D. Jones; Scandrick; Keith; Parker	Combs; Thompson	3:51
10.	"Beautiful Thing"	Crouch	Crouch	5:09
11.	"Could You Learn to Love"	Babyface	The Boom Brothers	4:10
12.	"Break of Dawn"	Jaz; Martika	Jaz	5:48
Total length:				57:32

Japan edition – bonus track
No.	Title	Writer(s)	Producer(s)	Length
13.	"Lately"	Stevie Wonder	Al B. Sure!	2:55

Sample credits

- "I Need You" contains elements from "Do It ('Til You're Satisfied)" as performed by B. T. Express.

== Personnel ==
Credits adapted from the liner notes of Back to the World.

Performers and musicians

- 112 – backing vocalist
- Anthony Bailey – backing vocalist
- Chris Bolden – drum programming
- Chuck Boom – backing vocalist
- Tevin Campbell – lead and backing vocalist
- Lua Croft – backing vocalist
- Keith Crouch – drum programming, percussion
- Derrick Edmondson – instruments
- Naimeh Heath – backing vocalist
- Jamey Jaz – backing vocalist, keyboards, drum programming
- Kipper Jones – backing vocalist
- Jimmy Keegan – drums, percussion
- Kenny Lattimore – backing vocalist
- Tiara LeMacks – backing vocalist
- Glenn McKinney – guitar
- Rahsaan Patterson – backing vocalist
- Tim Pierce – guitar
- Mikelyn Roderick – backing vocalist
- Jubu Smith – acoustic guitar
- Total – backing vocalist
- Kevin Wyatt – backing vocalist, bass

Technical

- Ryan Arnold – engineeríng assistant
- Ian Boxill – engineer
- The Boom Brothers – producer
- Tevin Campbell – executive producer
- Sean "Puffy" Combs – producer
- Lane Craven – mixing
- Keith Crouch – producer
- Derrick Edmondson – producer
- Jon Gass – mixing
- Stephanie Gylden – engineeríng assistant
- Dave Hancock – mixing assistant
- Jamey Jaz – producer
- Booker T. Jones – mixing
- Dwayne Jones – engineeríng assistant
- Eugene Lo – engineer
- Dave Pensado – engineer
- Craig Porteils – engineer
- Matt Silva – mixing assistant
- Stevie J – producer
- Michael Stradford – executive producer
- Al B. Sure! – producer
- Chucky Thompson – producer
- John Van Ness – mixing
- Doug Wilson – engineer

== Charts ==
Weekly chart performance for Back to the World
Chart (1996)	Peak position
Australian Albums (ARIA)	31
New Zealand Albums (RMNZ)	36
UK Albums (OCC)	109
UK R&B Albums (OCC)	16
US Billboard 200	46
US Top R&B/Hip-Hop Albums (Billboard)	11

== Release history ==
Back to the World release history
Region	Date	Format	Label	Ref(s)
United States	June 18, 1996	CD; cassette	Qwest; Warner Bros.	
Japan	July 10, 1996	CD; cassette	Qwest; Warner Bros.	
