= The Remix Collection (Boyz II Men album) =

Remix album by Boyz II Men
- Released: November 7, 1995
- Recorded: 1990–1995
- Genres: R&B, hip hop
- Length: 52:16
- Label: Motown
- Producers: Tim & Bob, Babyface, Dallas Austin, Jimmy Jam and Terry Lewis

Boyz II Men chronology
II (1994)	The Remix Collection (1995)	Evolution (1997)

Professional ratings
Review scores
Source	Rating
Allmusic	3/5 stars
Muzik	4/5 stars

The Remix Collection is a 1995 remix LP for R&B group Boyz II Men, issued by Motown Records. Released against the group's wishes, it began a chain of events that led to the eventual dissolution of Boyz II Men's relationship with Motown.

== Track listing ==
=== International edition ===
The album was produced by Dallas Austin and Jheryl Busby.

1. "Countdown Interlude" / "Under Pressure (Dallas Austin Mix)" / "Sympin' Interlude"
2. "Vibin' (The New Flava)" (ft. Treach, Craig Mack, Busta Rhymes and Method Man)
3. " I Remember" / "Motownphilly Interlude"
4. "Water Runs Dry (Strat Mix)"
5. "U Know (Dallas Austin Mix)"
6. "I'll Make Love to You (Make Love to You Version)" / "Motownphilly Interlude"
7. "Uhh, Ahh (Dedication Mix)"
8. "Motownphilly (Quiet Storm Version)"
9. "On Bended Knee (Human Rhythm Mix)"
10. "Brokenhearted (Soulpower Groove Mix)" (ft. Wanya Morris, Brandy and Sheree Ford Payne)
11. "Thank You (Moog Flava Mix)"
12. "Sympin' (Dallas Austin Mix)"

=== US edition ===
The album was produced by Dallas Austin and Jheryl Busby.

1. "Countdown Interlude" / "Under Pressure (Dallas Austin Mix)" / "Sympin' Interlude"
2. "Vibin' (The New Flava)" (ft. Treach, Craig Mack, Busta Rhymes and Method Man)
3. " I Remember" / "Motownphilly Interlude"
4. "Water Runs Dry (Strat Mix)"
5. "U Know (Dallas Austin Mix)"
6. "Hey, Lover" (LL Cool J (ft. Boyz II Men)
7. "I'll Make Love to You (Make Love to You Version)" / "Motownphilly Interlude"
8. "Uhh, Ahh (Dedication Mix)"
9. "Motownphilly (Quiet Storm Version)"
10. "On Bended Knee (Human Rhythm Mix)"
11. "Brokenhearted (Soulpower Groove Mix)" (ft. Wanya Morris, Brandy and Sheree Ford Payne)
12. "Sympin' (Dallas Austin Mix)"

== Charts ==
=== Weekly charts ===
Chart (1995)	Peak position
Australian Albums (ARIA)	39
Japanese Albums (Oricon)	6
US Billboard 200	17
US Top R&B/Hip-Hop Albums (Billboard)	15

=== Year-end charts ===
Chart (1996)	Position
US Billboard 200	71
US Top R&B/Hip-Hop Albums (Billboard)	95

== Certifications ==
Region	Certification	Certified units/sales
Canada (Music Canada)	Gold	50,000^{^}
Japan (RIAJ)	Gold	100,000^{^}
United States (RIAA)	Platinum	1,000,000^{^}
^{^} Shipments figures based on certification alone.
