= Billboard Year-End Hot Rap Singles of 1994 =

American music chart

This is a list of Billboard magazine's Top Hot Rap songs of 1994.

As with the regular Hot Rap Singles chart, the year-end chart increases from 30 slots to 50 for 1994.

| № | Title | Artist(s) |
|---|---|---|
| 1 | "Funkdafied" | Da Brat |
| 2 | "Tootsee Roll" | 69 Boyz |
| 3 | "Flava in Ya Ear" | Craig Mack |
| 4 | "Dunkie Butt (Please Please Please)" | 12 Gauge |
| 5 | "Getto Jam" | Domino |
| 6 | "Player's Ball" | Outkast |
| 7 | "Regulate" | Warren G and Nate Dogg |
| 8 | "Gin and Juice" | Snoop Doggy Dogg |
| 9 | "Got Me Waiting" | Heavy D & the Boyz |
| 10 | "Fantastic Voyage" | Coolio |
| 11 | "Keep Ya Head Up" | 2Pac |
| 12 | "Whatta Man" | Salt-n-Pepa featuring En Vogue |
| 13 | "Whoomp! (There It Is)" | Tag Team |
| 14 | "Juicy" / "Unbelievable" | The Notorious B.I.G. |
| 15 | "Back in the Day" | Ahmad |
| 16 | "Pumps and a Bump" | Hammer |
| 17 | "U.N.I.T.Y." | Queen Latifah |
| 18 | "Shoop" | Salt-n-Pepa |
| 19 | "Thuggish Ruggish Bone" | Bone Thugs-n-Harmony |
| 20 | "Cantaloop (Flip Fantasia)" | Us3 |
| 21 | "Born to Roll" | Masta Ace Incorporated |
| 22 | "This D.J." | Warren G |
| 23 | "What's My Name" | Snoop Doggy Dogg |
| 24 | "It's All Good" | Hammer |
| 25 | "You Know How We Do It" | Ice Cube |
| 26 | "Sweet Potatoe Pie" | Domino |
| 27 | "(I Know I Got) Skillz" | Shaquille O'Neal featuring Def Jef |
| 28 | "Funky Y-2-C" | The Puppies |
| 29 | "Real Muthaphuckkin G's" | Eazy-E featuring Dresta and B.G. Knocc Out |
| 30 | "C.R.E.A.M." | Wu-Tang Clan |
| 31 | "Take It Easy" | Mad Lion |
| 32 | "Comin' on Strong" | Sudden Change |
| 33 | "Bop Gun (One Nation)" | Ice Cube featuring George Clinton |
| 34 | "Worker Man" | Patra |
| 35 | "Somethin' to Ride To" | The Conscious Daughters |
| 36 | "Award Tour" | A Tribe Called Quest |
| 37 | "I'm Outstanding" | Shaquille O'Neal |
| 38 | "Nuttin' but Love" | Heavy D & the Boyz |
| 39 | "Give It Up" | Public Enemy |
| 40 | "Crooklyn" | Crooklyn Dodgers |
| 41 | "Come Clean" | Jeru the Damaja |
| 42 | "Nappy Heads" | Fugees |
| 43 | "Afro Puffs" | The Lady of Rage |
| 44 | "Really Doe" | Ice Cube |
| 45 | "Come Baby Come" | K7 |
| 46 | "Mass Appeal" | Gang Starr |
| 47 | "Where My Homiez? (Come Around My Way)" | Ill Al Skratch |
| 48 | "Romantic Call" | Patra featuring Yo-Yo |
| 49 | "Southernplayalisticadillacmuzik" | Outkast |
| 50 | "The Most Beautifullest Thing in This World" | Keith Murray |

== See also ==
- 1994 in music
- Billboard Year-End Hot 100 singles of 1994
- Billboard Year-End Hot R&B Singles of 1994
- List of Billboard number-one rap singles of 1994
