= Back to the World =

Back to the World may refer to:

- Back to the World (Curtis Mayfield album)
- Back to the World (Dennis DeYoung album)
- Back to the World (Street Dogs album)
- Back to the World (Tevin Campbell album)
  - "Back to the World" (song), a song from the Tevin Campbell album
