= 12 gauge =

12 gauge may refer to:

== Size ==
- 12-gauge shotgun, the most popular shotgun shell
- 12 gauge sheet metal
- 12 gauge wire

== Music ==
- 12 Gauge (Kalmah album), 2010 album by Finnish band Kalmah
- 12 Gauge (rapper) (born 1968), American rapper active in the 1990s
  - 12 Gauge (12 Gauge album), 1994 album by the above artist
- Emerson Drive, a Canadian rock group known as 12 Gauge from 1995 to 2000 before moving to Nashville

== Sports ==
- Paige VanZant, MMA fighter, nicknamed "12 gauge".

== See also ==
- Gauge (disambiguation)
