= I Got It Bad =

I Got It Bad may refer to:

- "I Got It Bad (and That Ain't Good)", a 1941 pop and jazz standard by Duke Ellington and Paul Francis Webster
- "I Got It Bad" (Tevin Campbell song), 1996
- "I Got It Bad" (Addison Rae song), 2023
