= Back to the World (song) =

Single by Tevin Campbell

from the album Back to the World
- Released: June 4, 1996
- Recorded: August 1995
- Length: 5:00
- Label: Qwest
- Songwriters: Jamey Jaz; Rahsaan Patterson; Mikelyn Roderick
- Producer: Jamey Jaz

Tevin Campbell singles chronology
"Don't Say Goodbye Girl" (1995)	"Back to the World" (1996)	"I Got It Bad" (1996)

"Back to the World" is a song by American R&B singer Tevin Campbell. It was written by Jamey Jaz, Rahsaan Patterson, and Mikelyn Roderick for his third album of the same name (1996). The song became a top ten hit in New Zealand, peaking at number eight on the New Zealand Singles Chart, and entered the top 40 in Australia. In the US, "Back to the World" was the only single from its parent album to garner decent success on the charts, peaking at number 16 on the Hot R&B/Hip-Hop Songs chart.

== Music video ==
A music video for "Back to the World" was directed by Bille Woodruff.

== Track listings ==
CD single
No.	Title	Writer(s)	Producer(s)	Length
1.	"Back to the World" (Album Version)	Jamey Jaz; Rahsaan Patterson; Mikelyn Roderick	Jaz	5:00
2.	"Back to the World" (Instrumental)	Jaz; Patterson; Roderick	Jaz	5:00

CD maxi-single
No.	Title	Writer(s)	Producer(s)	Length
1.	"Back to the World" (Album Version)	Jamey Jaz; Rahsaan Patterson; Mikelyn Roderick	Jaz	5:00
2.	"Lately" (Non-LP Track)	Stevie Wonder	Al B. Sure!	4:24
3.	"Can We Talk"	Babyface; Daryl Simmons	Babyface; Simmons	4:44

Notes

- ^{^[a]} denotes additional producer

== Credits and personnel ==
Credits lifted from the liner notes of Back to the World.

- Tevin Campbell – executive producer, vocals
- Lua Crofts – background vocalist
- Jamey Jaz – background vocalist, producer, writer
- Rahsaan Patterson – background vocalist, writer
- Michael Stradford – executive producer
- Mikelyn Roderick – background vocalist, writer

== Charts ==
=== Weekly charts ===
Weekly chart performance for "Back to the World"
Chart (1996)	Peak position
Australia (ARIA)	31
New Zealand (Recorded Music NZ)	8
US Billboard Hot 100	47
US Dance Club Songs (Billboard)	33
US Hot R&B/Hip-Hop Songs (Billboard)	16
US Pop Airplay (Billboard)	30
US Rhythmic Airplay (Billboard)	14

=== Year-end charts ===
Year-end chart performance for "Back to the World"
Chart (1996)	Position
New Zealand (Recorded Music NZ)	44
