= Christmas Interpretations =

Studio album by Boyz II Men
- Released: October 5, 1993; October 4, 2024 (remaster)
- Length: 40:57
- Label: Motown
- Producers: Boyz II Men; Brian McKnight

Boyz II Men chronology
Cooleyhighharmony (1991)	Christmas Interpretations (1993)	II (1994)

Christmas Interpretations is the first Christmas album and second overall studio album by American R&B group Boyz II Men. It was released on October 5, 1993, by Motown. Several of the tracks are originals, written by Boyz II Men with labelmate and longtime friend Brian McKnight; others are traditional Christmas songs. It was remastered and re-released on October 4, 2024. Christmas Interpretations served as the follow-up to their debut album Cooleyhighharmony (1991).

== Critical reception ==
Professional ratings
Review scores
Source	Rating
AllMusic	3/5 stars
Entertainment Weekly	B
Music Week	3/5 stars

AllMusic editor Jose F. Promis described the album as "a cozy, velvety, and hip quiet storm Christmas album with touches of jazz, nostalgia, and melancholy but, at times, one yearns to hear the Boyz' lush harmonies wrapped around traditional favorites." Entertainment Weekly critic David Browne wrote that Boyz II Men "lusciously harmonize on Christmas Interpretations. With the exception of "Silent Night," the album consists entirely of new songs, most with mournful seasonal themes. It's a pretty gutsy move, but hampered by the fact that none of the originals are as memorable as, say, "Silent Night"."

== Chart performance ==
Christmas Interpretations peaked at number 19 in the US Billboard 200. The album had sold 1,767,000 copies by December 2012.

== Track listing ==
No.	Title	Writer(s)	Producer(s)	Length
1.	"Silent Night (Intro)"			1:07
2.	"Let It Snow" (featuring Brian McKnight)	Wanya Morris; McKnight	McKnight; Boyz II Men^{[a]}	4:11
3.	"Share Love"	Nathan Morris	N. Morris; McKnight^{[a]}; W. Morris^{[a]}; Shawn Stockman^{[a]}; Michael McCary^{[a]}	3:32
4.	"You're Not Alone"	Stockman	Stockman; McKnight^{[a]}; W. Morris^{[a]}; N. Morris^{[a]}; McCary^{[a]}	5:06
5.	"A Joyous Song"	Stockman	Stockman; McKnight^{[a]}; W. Morris^{[a]}; N. Morris^{[a]}; McCary^{[a]}	5:53
6.	"Why Christmas"	W. Morris	W. Morris; McKnight^{[a]}; N. Morris^{[a]}; Stockman^{[a]}; McCary^{[a]}	4:53
7.	"Cold December Nights"	McCary; Stockman	McCary; McKnight^{[a]}; W. Morris^{[a]}; N. Morris^{[a]}; Stockman^{[a]}	4:11
8.	"Do They Know"	N. Morris	N. Morris; McKnight^{[a]}; W. Morris^{[a]}; Stockman^{[a]}; McCary^{[a]}	3:29
9.	"Who Would Have Thought"	McKnight; W. Morris	W. Morris; McKnight^{[a]}; N. Morris^{[a]}	6:06
10.	"Silent Night"	Franz Xaver Gruber; Joseph Mohr	Boyz II Men	2:32

Notes

- ^a signifies a co-producer

== Charts ==
=== Weekly charts ===
Chart (1993)	Peak position
US Billboard 200	19
US Top Holiday Albums (Billboard)	2
US Top R&B/Hip-Hop Albums (Billboard)	6

=== Year-end charts ===
Chart (1994)	Position
US Top R&B/Hip-Hop Albums (Billboard)	48

== Certifications ==
Region	Certification	Certified units/sales
Canada (Music Canada)	Gold	50,000^{^}
United States (RIAA)	2× Platinum	2,000,000^{^}
^{^} Shipments figures based on certification alone.
