= Code Red (group) =

British boy band

- Also known as: CR
- Origin: United Kingdom
- Genres: Pop; R&B
- Years active: 1995–2001
- Labels: Polydor; Telstar
- Past members: Roger Ratajczak; Phillip Rodell; Neil Watts; Lee Missen

Code Red were a British boy band, formed in 1994.

== Career ==
Roger Ratajczak, Phillip Rodell, Neil Watts, and Lee Missen, formed themselves as the lineup for the vocal harmony group in 1994. The band were discovered by British producer and songwriter Nicky Graham and later signed by Polydor Records. They performed in the 1996 Great British Song Contest, at the time the UK's precursor to the Eurovision Song Contest, with the song "I Gave You Everything", and finished as runners-up in the competition to Gina G.

Their debut album Scarlet was released in 1997, and produced the UK hits "This Is Our Song", "Is There Someone Out There?" and a cover of the Tevin Campbell original, "Can We Talk". Additionally, the band went on to big success in South East Asia, notching up numerous number 1 hit singles in multiple markets. In 1997 they won best new pop act at the Channel V Music Awards, hosted in Dehli, India. At the awards ceremony the band performed their hit single 'We Can Make It', a duet sung with Asha Bhosle. Between 1996 and 2000 the band did numerous, large scale tours of the region, including a sellout show at the National Stadium, Singapore in 1998. During the height of their success in SE Asia, in June 1997 the band performed at the Handover Ceremony celebrating Hong Kong's reclaimed independence.

They appeared in the Sooty & Co. Christmas special 1997 episode "Fun In The Snow", where they performed "If You Go Away".

Two years later, they released Missin You Already on Telstar Records, a follow-up album which featured two hits, "What Would You Do If...?" and "What Good Is a Heart", which became a number 2 hit on the MTV Asia Hitlist.

The following year (2000) the band released their third and final album Crimson.

The group eventually disbanded in 2001.

== Discography ==
Studio albums

- 1997: Scarlet
- 1999: Missin You Already
- 2000: Crimson

Singles

- 1996: "I Gave You Everything" – UK #50
- 1996: "This Is Our Song" – UK #59
- 1997: "Can We Talk" – UK #29
- 1997: "Is There Someone Out There?" – UK #34
- 1998: "What Would You Do If...?" – UK #55
