= II (Boyz II Men album) =

Studio album by Boyz II Men
- Released: August 30, 1994
- Recorded: December 1993–May 1994
- Studios: Kajem Studios, Studio 4 in Philadelphia, Pennsylvania; Doppler Studios, D.A.R.P. Studios, Studio LaCoCo in Atlanta, Georgia; The Enterprises, Encore Studios in Burbank, California; Flyte Tyme Studios in Edina, Minnesota; Larrabee Sound Studios, Skip Saylor Recording, Lighthouse Studios in Los Angeles, California; Backroom Studios in Glendale, California; Granny's House Studios in Reno, Nevada
- Genres: R&B; soul; pop; hip-hop soul
- Length: 57:38
- Label: Motown
- Producers: Dallas Austin; Babyface; Boyz II Men; Tim & Bob; The Characters; Jimmy Jam & Terry Lewis; Brian McKnight; L.A. Reid; Tony Rich

Boyz II Men chronology
Christmas Interpretations (1993)	II (1994)	The Remix Collection (1995)

Singles from II
- 1. "I'll Make Love to You" Released: July 26, 1994; 2. "On Bended Knee" Released: November 1, 1994; 3. "Thank You" Released: February 7, 1995; 4. "Water Runs Dry" Released: April 11, 1995

II is the third studio album by American R&B quartet Boyz II Men, released on August 30, 1994, on Motown Records. Motown assembled a broader production team than for their debut, Cooleyhighharmony (1991), bringing in Jimmy Jam and Terry Lewis, Tim & Bob, Tony Rich, Brian McKnight, and Babyface alongside previous collaborators Dallas Austin, Troy Taylor and Charles Farrar. Boyz II Men themselves also received songwriting credits on most of the album's tracks, with the members contributing to the songs to varying degrees, and served as producers on several tracks.

Critics widely praised II as a polished and more sophisticated follow-up to Cooleyhighharmony, highlighting Boyz II Men's vocals, mature romantic themes, and the album's lush production. II became the inaugural winner of the Grammy Award for Best R&B Album, first presented at the 37th Grammy Awards in 1995. Commercially, II surpassed its predecessor, debuting at number one on the Billboard 200 with 350,000 first-week sales, while eventually selling 8.6 million copies in the US and receiving a 12-times-platinum RIAA certification; internationally, it also earned additional multi-platinum, platinum, and gold certifications.

II was promoted by a series of successful singles, led by "I'll Make Love to You," which reached number one on the Billboard Hot 100 for 14 consecutive weeks. It was succeeded at the top by "On Bended Knee," making Boyz II Men only the third act after Elvis Presley and The Beatles to replace themselves at number one, while "Water Runs Dry," "Thank You," and "Vibin'" peaked at numbers two, 21, and 52, respectively. In 2020, the album was ranked number 495 on Rolling Stone's 500 Greatest Albums of All Time.

== Background ==
In 1991, Boyz II Men released their debut studio album, Cooleyhighharmony, which established the group as one of the leading acts in contemporary R&B through its blend of new jack swing, soul, doo-wop, and intricate vocal harmonies. The album became a major commercial success, peaking at number three on the US Billboard 200 and number one on the Top R&B/Hip-Hop Albums chart, with US sales approaching seven million copies. It also ranked among the year's best-selling albums, reaching number 12 on the 1992 Billboard 200 year-end chart and number 10 on the year-end Top R&B/Hip-Hop Albums chart. Its 1992 reissue, particularly the international breakthrough of their single "End of the Road," propelled the group to global prominence and set high expectations for their follow-up. Before beginning work on their second studio album, Boyz II Men recorded the Christmas album Christmas Interpretations, released in October 1993. Combining original songs with traditional Christmas material, the album sold 1,767,000 copies in the United States by December 2012.

While production on Cooleyhighharmony had been largely overseen by Dallas Austin, with additional work from Troy Taylor and Charles Farrar of The Characters, Motown aexpanded the production team for II, with Boyz II Men themselves contributing as producers alongside Jimmy Jam and Terry Lewis, Bob Robinson and Tim Kelley from duo Tim & Bob, Tony Rich, Brian McKnight, and Babyface. According to producer Bob Robinson, he and Tim Kelley were initially asked by Boyz II Men to produce much of the album. However, Motown president Jheryl Busby was reportedly reluctant to entrust the group's follow-up to two relatively unknown producers, given Boyz II Men's status as one of the label's biggest acts. Busby subsequently brought in Jimmy Jam and Terry Lewis and Babyface, whose contributions became central to the album's polished sound. More than 20 songs were recorded for II, although most were ultimately omitted from the final track listing. Two songs produced by Tim & Bob, "Now That We're Done" and "Can I Touch You", were later recorded by 112 for their 1996 self-titled debut. The spoken interlude "Khalil (Interlude)" pays tribute to the group's road manager, Roderick "Khalil" Rountree, who was shot and killed in Chicago in May 1992 while Boyz II Men were opening for MC Hammer's Too Legit to Quit World Tour.

== Promotion ==
The album was promoted by a series of commercially successful singles, led by "I'll Make Love to You." Released despite objections from the group, who felt there were songs that could have been much stronger singles, Busby insisted on "I'll Make Love to You" being the first single. It reached number one on the US Billboard Hot 100 and spent 14 consecutive weeks atop the chart. It was followed at number one by "On Bended Knee," which replaced "I'll Make Love to You" at the summit, making Boyz II Men the third act after Elvis Presley and The Beatles to replace themselves at number one and the first to do so in 30 years. The success of "I'll Make Love to You" also gave the group consecutive double-digit runs at number one, following the 13-week reign of "End of the Road," while equaling the record previously set by Whitney Houston's "I Will Always Love You." Other singles included "Water Runs Dry," which peaked at number two, "Thank You," which reached number 21, and "Vibin'," which peaked at number 52.

== Critical reception ==
Professional ratings
Review scores
Source	Rating
AllMusic	4.5/5 stars
Robert Christgau	(3-star Honorable Mention)
Entertainment Weekly	A
The Rolling Stone Album Guide	4/5 stars
Select	1/5 medals

Critics generally praised II as a polished and more sophisticated follow-up to Cooleyhighharmony, highlighting Boyz II Men's vocals, mature romantic themes, lush production, and successful ballads. AllMusic editor Stephen Thomas Erlewine praised II as a "carefully constructed crowd pleaser" that built on the strengths of Boyz II Men's debut, highlighting the group's soaring vocals on its slower songs and noting the success of singles "I'll Make Love to You" and "On Bended Knee." Entertainment Weekly iewed the album as a more sophisticated follow-up to the debut Cooleyhighharmony, highlighting its mature themes of romance, commitment, and communication, as well as the group's lush vocal and string arrangements and understated charm. Writing for Rolling Stone, Paul Evans found II as appealing as Cooleyhighharmony, highlighting Boyz II Men’s strong vocals and the polished production of Babyface and Jimmy Jam and Terry Lewis. He particularly praised the romantic ballads "I'll Make Love to You" and "On Bended Knee," while noting the album's subtle experimentation with string arrangements, jazz vocalese, and a cappella performances. In 2020, II was ranked number 495 on Rolling Stone's list of the 500 Greatest Albums of All Time.

=== Accolades ===
The album won Best R&B Album at the 37th Grammy Awards. The album was ranked number 495 on the September 22, 2020 edition of Rolling Stone's 500 Greatest Albums of All Time.

== Commercial performance ==
In the United States, II debuted at number one on the Billboard 200 with first-week sales of 350,000 copies and spent a total of five weeks atop the chart. It also reached number one on the Top R&B/Hip-Hop Albums chart, improving on the respective peaks of their debut album, Cooleyhighharmony. The album ranked at number 22 on the Billboard 200 year-end chart and number 10 on the year-end Top R&B/Hip-Hop Albums chart for 1994, before rising to number three and number four, respectively, on the 1995 year-end charts. It also ranked at number 13 on the Billboard 200 decade-end chart for the 1990s. II ultimately sold 8.6 million copies in the United States, according to Nielsen SoundScan, and was certified 12-times platinum by the Recording Industry Association of America (RIAA), representing 12 million certified units.

Internationally, II also was a major success, reaching the top five in Australia, France, and New Zealand. It peaked at number one in France and New Zealand, while reaching number four in Australia. The album also reached the top 10 in Japan and the Netherlands, peaking at numbers nine and seven, respectively, and charted within the top 20 in Germany, Spain, and the European Top 100 Albums chart. Its performance in the United Kingdom was comparatively modest, where it peaked at number 17 on the UK Albums Chart, although it reached number six on the UK R&B Albums chart. II received multi-platinum certifications in Australia and Canada, platinum certifications in France and New Zealand, and gold certifications in Japan, the Netherlands, Spain, and the United Kingdom. It was also certified platinum across Europe by the International Federation of the Phonographic Industry (IFPI), representing one million units.

== Track listing ==
II track listing
No.	Title	Writer(s)	Producer(s)	Length
1.	"Thank You"	Michael S. McCary; Nathan Morris; Wanya Morris; Shawn Stockman; Dallas Austin	Boyz II Men, Austin	4:37
2.	"All Around the World"	James Harris III; Terry Lewis; McCary; N. Morris; W. Morris; Stockman; Daddy-O	Jimmy Jam & Terry Lewis	4:56
3.	"U Know"	McCary; N. Morris; W. Morris; Stockman; Tim Kelley; Bob Robinson; Curtis Mayfield	Boyz II Men; Tim Kelley & Bob Robinson	4:46
4.	"Vibin'"	McCary; N. Morris; W. Morris; Stockman; Kelley; Robinson	Tim & Bob	4:28
5.	"I Sit Away"	Tony Rich	L.A. Reid; Rich	4:35
6.	"Jezzebel"	W. Morris; Stockman; Troy Taylor; Charles Farrar	The Characters	6:07
7.	"Khalil (Interlude)"	N. Morris; Stockman	Tim & Bob	1:41
8.	"Trying Times"	W. Morris; Kelley; Robinson	W. Morris; Tim & Bob	5:23
9.	"I'll Make Love to You"	Babyface	Babyface	3:56
10.	"On Bended Knee"	Harris III; Lewis	Jimmy Jam & Terry Lewis	5:30
11.	"50 Candles"	Stockman; Kelley; Robinson	Stockman; Tim & Bob	5:08
12.	"Water Runs Dry"	Babyface	Babyface	3:21
13.	"Yesterday"	Paul McCartney; John Lennon	Boyz II Men	3:09

International bonus track
No.	Title	Writer(s)	Producer(s)	Length
14.	"Fallin'"	Brian McKnight; Brandon Barnes	McKnight	4:09

Notes

- "Thank You" contains a sample from "La-Di-Da-Di", performed by Doug E. Fresh, and written by Richard Walters and Douglas Davis.
- "All Around the World" contains samples from "Kid Capri" by Daddy-O.
- "U Know" contains a sample from "Don't Change Your Love", performed by The Five Stairsteps.
- "Jezzebel" contains a sample of "Hootie Mack" by Bell Biv Devoe.

== Charts ==
=== Weekly charts ===
Weekly chart performance for II
Chart (1994–95)	Peak position
Australian Albums (ARIA)	4
Canadian Albums (RPM)	3
Dutch Albums (Album Top 100)	7
European Albums (European Top 100 Albums)	16
French Albums (SNEP)	1
German Albums (Offizielle Top 100)	18
Japanese Albums (Oricon)	9
New Zealand Albums (RMNZ)	1
Spanish Albums (PROMUSICAE)	13
Swedish Albums (Sverigetopplistan)	20
Swiss Albums (Schweizer Hitparade)	21
UK Albums (Official Charts)	17
UK R&B Albums (Official Charts)	6
US Billboard 200	1
US Top R&B/Hip-Hop Albums (Billboard)	1
Zimbabwe Albums (ZIMA)	3

=== Year-end charts ===
1994 year-end chart performance for II
Chart (1994)	Position
Australian Albums (ARIA)	14
Canada Top Albums/CDs (RPM)	18
Dutch Albums (Album Top 100)	98
French Albums (SNEP)	27
New Zealand Albums (RMNZ)	40
US Billboard 200	22
US Top R&B/Hip-Hop Albums (Billboard)	10

1995 year-end chart performance for II
Chart (1995)	Position
Canada Top Albums/CDs (RPM)	22
European Albums (European Top 100 Albums)	73
French Albums (SNEP)	15
US Billboard 200	3
US Top R&B/Hip-Hop Albums (Billboard)	4

=== Decade-end charts ===
Decade-end chart performance for II
Chart (1990–1999)	Position
US Billboard 200	13

== Certifications ==
Certifications and sales for II
Region	Certification	Certified units/sales
Australia (ARIA)	2× Platinum	140,000^{^}
Canada (Music Canada)	5× Platinum	500,000^{^}
France (SNEP)	Platinum	300,000^{*}
Japan (RIAJ)	Gold	100,000^{^}
Netherlands (NVPI)	Gold	50,000^{^}
New Zealand (RMNZ)	Platinum	15,000^{^}
Spain (Promusicae)	Gold	50,000^{^}
United Kingdom (BPI)	Gold	100,000^{*}
United States (RIAA)	12× Platinum	12,000,000^{^}
Summaries
Europe (IFPI)	Platinum	1,000,000^{*}
^{*} Sales figures based on certification alone.^{^} Shipments figures based on certification alone.

== Release history ==
Release dates for II
Region	Date	Label	Format
United States	August 30, 1994	Motown	Cassette, CD
United Kingdom	September 12, 1994	Motown	Cassette, CD

== See also ==
- List of best-selling albums in the United States
- List of number-one albums of 1994 (U.S.)
- List of number-one albums of 1995 (U.S.)
- List of number-one R&B albums of 1994 (U.S.)
