= List of number-one R&B singles of 1994 (U.S.) =

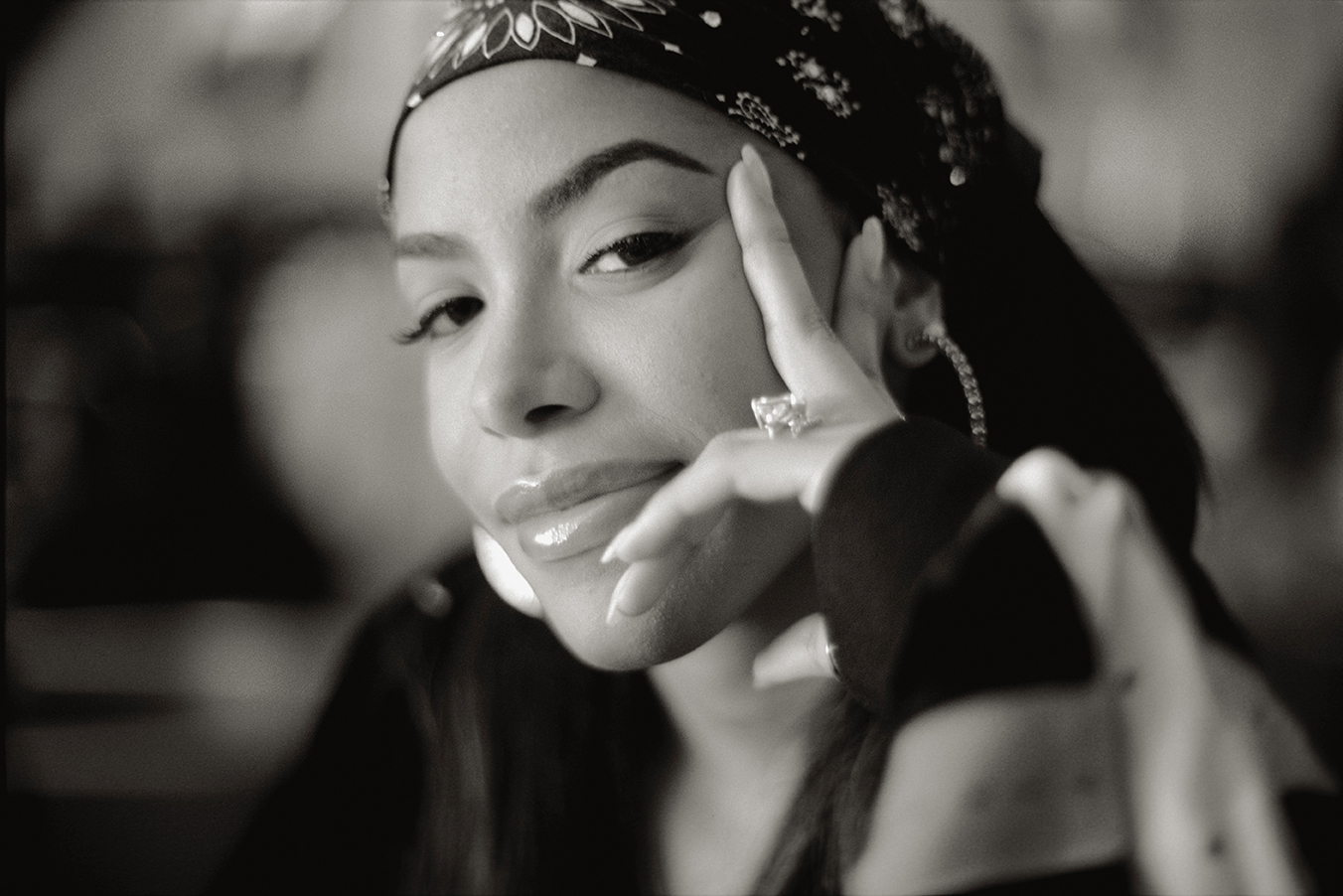
Aaliyah (pictured in 2000) reached number one with "Back & Forth".

These are the Billboard magazine R&B singles chart number one hits of 1994:

== Chart history ==
Key
†	Indicates best-charting R&B single of 1994

Issue date	Song	Artist(s)'
January 1	"Can We Talk"	Tevin Campbell
January 8	"Can We Talk"	Tevin Campbell
January 15	"Cry for You"	Jodeci
January 22	"Cry for You"	Jodeci
January 29	"Cry for You"	Jodeci
February 5	"Cry for You"	Jodeci
February 12	"Understanding"	Xscape
February 19	"Understanding"	Xscape
February 26	"Bump n' Grind" †	R. Kelly
March 5	"Bump n' Grind" †	R. Kelly
March 12	"Bump n' Grind" †	R. Kelly
March 19	"Bump n' Grind" †	R. Kelly
March 26	"Bump n' Grind" †	R. Kelly
April 2	"Bump n' Grind" †	R. Kelly
April 9	"Bump n' Grind" †	R. Kelly
April 16	"Bump n' Grind" †	R. Kelly
April 23	"Bump n' Grind" †	R. Kelly
April 30	"Bump n' Grind" †	R. Kelly
May 7	"Bump n' Grind" †	R. Kelly
May 14	"Bump n' Grind" †	R. Kelly
May 21	"Back & Forth"	Aaliyah
May 28	"Back & Forth"	Aaliyah
June 4	"Back & Forth"	Aaliyah
June 11	"Any Time, Any Place"	Janet Jackson
June 18	"Any Time, Any Place"	Janet Jackson
June 25	"Any Time, Any Place"	Janet Jackson
July 2	"Any Time, Any Place"	Janet Jackson
July 9	"Any Time, Any Place"	Janet Jackson
July 16	"Any Time, Any Place"	Janet Jackson
July 23	"Any Time, Any Place"	Janet Jackson
July 30	"Any Time, Any Place"	Janet Jackson
August 6	"Any Time, Any Place"	Janet Jackson
August 13	"Any Time, Any Place"	Janet Jackson
August 20	"I'll Make Love to You"	Boyz II Men
August 27	"I'll Make Love to You"	Boyz II Men
September 3	"I'll Make Love to You"	Boyz II Men
September 10	"I'll Make Love to You"	Boyz II Men
September 17	"I'll Make Love to You"	Boyz II Men
September 24	"I'll Make Love to You"	Boyz II Men
October 1	"I'll Make Love to You"	Boyz II Men
October 8	"I'll Make Love to You"	Boyz II Men
October 15	"I'll Make Love to You"	Boyz II Men
October 22	"I Wanna Be Down"	Brandy
October 29	"I Wanna Be Down"	Brandy
November 5	"I Wanna Be Down"	Brandy
November 12	"I Wanna Be Down"	Brandy
November 19	"Practice What You Preach"	Barry White
November 26	"Practice What You Preach"	Barry White
December 3	"Practice What You Preach"	Barry White
December 10	"Creep"	TLC
December 17	"Creep"	TLC
December 24	"Creep"	TLC
December 31	"Creep"	TLC

== See also ==
- 1994 in music
- Billboard Year-End Hot R&B Singles of 1994
- List of number-one R&B hits (United States)
- List of number-one R&B albums of 1994 (U.S.)
