= Water Runs Dry =

1995 single by Boyz II Men

Single by Boyz II Men

from the album II
- Released: April 11, 1995
- Genre: R&B
- Length: 3:22
- Label: Motown
- Songwriter: Babyface
- Producer: Babyface

Boyz II Men singles chronology
"Thank You" (1995)	"Water Runs Dry" (1995)	"Vibin'" (1995)

Music video
- "Water Runs Dry" on YouTube

"Water Runs Dry" is a song by American vocal harmony group Boyz II Men, written and produced by Babyface. The single was released in April 1995, by Motown, as the fourth single from their third album, II (1994), reaching number two on the US Billboard Hot 100 and number four in Canada. It also contains a version of the group's previous number one hit from the same album, "I'll Make Love to You". A Spanish version, "No dejemos que muera el amor", was also recorded and peaked at number 10 on the US Latin Pop Airplay chart.

== Critical reception ==
Pan-European magazine Music & Media wrote, "This may be another ballad—and one with great harmonies—but it is not as sugary as its forerunners. Besides, there's more of a beat behind it, and a delightfully lazy wah guitar."

== Music video ==
In a 2019 interview with the Recording Academy, Boyz II Men member Nathan Morris said the music video was one of his two favorites out of all the videos the group had ever made. Directed by Wayne Isham, it was filmed at White Sands National Park in New Mexico.

=== Synopsis ===
The music video features a woman walking through a desert setting and holding a glass ball. The camera zooms in on the ball to reveal an aerial view, from a helicopter, of Boyz II Men standing atop a sand dune inside the ball. Shots of a string orchestra and guitarist playing along are interspersed throughout as the group sings the song. Clips of both the woman and the group walking and running across the dunes are also shown. Some scenes feature a rippling effect that mimics water. The video ends with the woman holding the glass ball once again and the camera zooming out to show her watching the group walk away inside it.

=== Reception ===
In a brief throwback-to-1995 piece, Essence magazine jokingly commented that the video "has more white-on-white sets than, well, the Essence Festival", but also said that it was "full of more 90s goodness" and concluded with "We love it". Pop culture website Vulture listed the outfits worn in the video by Boyz II Men as one of the forty "matchiest" of their careers, stating that the group's clothes, like their music, were "always harmonious".

The music video received two MTV VMA nominations for Best Cinematography and Best R&B Video at the 1995 MTV Video Music Awards but did not win. It was additionally nominated for Best R&B/Soul Single – Group, Band or Duo at the 1996 Soul Train Music Awards, but lost to TLC's "Waterfalls.

== Live performances ==
Boyz II Men performed an acoustic rendition of "Water Runs Dry" at the 1995 MTV Movie Awards. They later headlined the "Budweiser Superfest" concert series that ran from July through August of that year, and performed the song as part of the setlist for each show. In 2018, the group was one of the opening acts for Bruno Mars on five dates (between September–October) of the second North-American leg of his 24K Magic World Tour, and performed the song during their appearances.

== Track listings ==
- US remixes
1. "Water Runs Dry" (Strat mix edit) – 3:53
2. "Water Runs Dry" (Strat mix) – 4:51
3. "Water Runs Dry" (Mood mix edit) – 4:10
4. "Water Runs Dry" (Mood mix) – 4:44
5. "Water Runs Dry" (LP version) – 3:21
- US maxi-CD
1. "Water Runs Dry" (LP version) – 3:21
2. "Water Runs Dry" (Mood mix) – 4:43
3. "Water Runs Dry" (Strat mix) – 4:51
4. "Water Runs Dry" (Groove mix) – 4:30
5. "Water Runs Dry" (Bump mix) – 4:38
- UK maxi-CD
1. "Water Runs Dry" (Strat mix edit) – 4:00
2. "Water Runs Dry" (LP version) – 3:21
3. "Water Runs Dry" (Mood mix) – 4:43
4. "I'll Make Love To You" (pop edit) – 3:49

== Credits and personnel ==
Credits are adapted from Tidal.

- Boyz II Men – primary vocals
- Babyface – songwriting, production
- Colin Heldt – immersive mix engineering
- Reggie Hamilton – string arrangement

== Charts ==
=== Weekly charts ===
Weekly chart performance for "Water Runs Dry"
Chart (1995)	Peak position
Australia (ARIA)	36
Canada Top Singles (RPM)	4
Canada Retail Singles (The Record)	33
Canada Contemporary Hit Radio (The Record)	2
Canada Adult Contemporary (RPM)	2
Europe (European Hit Radio)	20
France Airplay (SNEP)	37
Iceland (Íslenski Listinn Topp 40)	14
Israel (Israeli Singles Chart)	4
Netherlands (Dutch Top 40 Tipparade)	17
Netherlands (Single Top 100 Tipparade)	14
New Zealand (Recorded Music NZ)	19
Scottish Singles Sales (Official Charts)	62
UK Singles (Official Charts)	24
UK Airplay (Music Week)	47
UK Hip Hop/R&B (Official Charts)	5
US Billboard Hot 100	2
US Adult Contemporary (Billboard)	3
US Adult Pop Airplay (Billboard)	19
US Dance Singles Sales (Billboard)	30
US Hot R&B/Hip-Hop Songs (Billboard)	4
US Latin Pop Airplay (Billboard) "No dejemos que muera el amor"	10
US Pop Airplay (Billboard)	2
US Rhythmic Airplay (Billboard)	3
US Cash Box Top 100	1
Zimbabwe (ZIMA)	1

=== Year-end charts ===
Year-end chart performance for "Water Runs Dry"
Chart (1995)	Position
Canada Top Singles (RPM)	35
Canada Adult Contemporary (RPM)	11
US Billboard Hot 100	12
US Adult Contemporary (Billboard)	17
US Hot R&B Singles (Billboard)	23
US Top 40/Mainstream (Billboard)	10
US Top 40/Rhythm-Crossover (Billboard)	7
US Cash Box Top 100	10

== Certifications ==
Certifications for "Water Runs Dry"
Region	Certification	Certified units/sales
United States (RIAA)	Platinum	1,000,000^{‡}
^{‡} Sales+streaming figures based on certification alone.

== Release history ==
Release dates and formats for "Water Runs Dry"
Region	Date	Format(s)	Label(s)	Ref.
United States	April 11, 1995	12-inch vinyl; CD; cassette	Motown	
Japan	May 25, 1995	Mini-CD	Motown	
Australia	June 19, 1995	CD; cassette	Motown	
United Kingdom	June 26, 1995	12-inch vinyl; CD; cassette	Motown	

== Renditions ==
In 1998, contemporary jazz guitarist Chuck Loeb covered the song for his album The Moon, the Stars and the Setting Sun.

American cover band Boyce Avenue released an acoustic version of the song in 2010.

Contemporary Christian group the Katinas covered the song for their 2013 album Love Chapter.

American singer Kelly Clarkson performed a stripped-down version of the song, accompanied by only a guitarist, on the June 7, 2021, episode of her daytime television talk show The Kelly Clarkson Show, during the "Kellyoke" (Note: Clarkson opens the show with a musical performance of various songs requested by audience members—she performs one cover per episode.) segment.
