= Thank You (Boyz II Men song) =

1995 single by Boyz II Men

Single by Boyz II Men

from the album II
- Released: February 7, 1995
- Genre: Doo-wop; hip-hop
- Length: 4:34
- Label: Motown
- Songwriters: Dallas Austin; Boyz II Men
- Producers: Dallas Austin; Boyz II Men

Boyz II Men singles chronology
"On Bended Knee" (1994)	"Thank You" (1995)	"Water Runs Dry" (1995)

"Thank You" is a song by American R&B/soul group Boyz II Men, released in February 1995 by Motown as the third single from their second studio album, II (1994). The song was co-produced by Dallas Austin and Boyz II Men. It reached number 21 on the US Billboard Hot 100 chart and also reached number 17 on the Billboard Hot R&B Singles chart. Worldwide, the song entered the top 20 in New Zealand and the top 40 in Australia, Canada, France, and the United Kingdom. The album version of the song is a cappella, consisting only of sounds created by the human voice.

== Critical reception ==
Dave Sholin from the Gavin Report wrote, "Coming to the end of the road for ballads (at least until this track peaks), Motown's most successful and exciting act in decades turns up the heat. Slow jammin' or slammin' it, the Boyz's sound is hard to top." Gill Whyte from Smash Hits gave it a score of four out of five, adding, "It's another yo-ho gospel number with bottom-wobbling harmonies, obligatory hand-clapping and big vocals stretched to their emotional limit from the Boyz-with-matching-shirts-done-up-to-their-fat-necks. This one, quelle surprise, is a homage to the woman in his life. [...] Still, it's pretty darned funky with lots of fancy, jazzy twiddly bits, and this is the moog flava mix, so you can bet your hymn book that means it's damned cool. Er, and it is!"

== Track listings ==
- Single
1. "Thank You" (LP version) – 4:34
2. "Thank You" (the remix) – 6:29
3. "Thank You" (Summertime mix) – 4:59
4. "Thank You" (The Moog Flava mix) – 4:15
5. "Thank You" (Mercenary mix) – 5:16
- US maxi-CD
1. "Thank You" (the Moog Flava mix) – 4:15
2. "Thank You" (Mercenary mix) – 5:16
3. "Thank You" (LP version) – 4:33
4. "Thank You" (the remix) – 6:29
5. "Thank You" (Summertime mix) – 4:59
6. "Fallin'" – 4:08
- UK maxi-CD
1. "Thank You" (The Moog Flava mix)
2. "Thank You" (LP version)
3. "Thank You" (the remix)
4. "Motownphilly" (7-inch radio edit)
- UK vinyl, 12-inch

A1. "Thank You" (the remix)
A2. "Thank You" (the Moog Flava mix)
B1. "Thank You" (LP version)
B2. "Thank You" (Summertime mix)

== Charts ==
=== Weekly charts ===
Chart (1995)	Peak position
Australia (ARIA)	33
Canada Retail Singles (The Record)	31
Canada Contemporary Hit Radio (The Record)	17
Europe (European Hit Radio)	29
France (SNEP)	27
France Airplay (SNEP)	3
Netherlands (Dutch Top 40 Tipparade)	16
New Zealand (RIANZ)	17
Scotland (OCC)	59
UK Singles (OCC)	26
UK Airplay (Music Week)	19
US Billboard Hot 100	21
US Hot R&B Singles (Billboard)	17
US Cash Box Top 100	11

=== Year-end charts ===
Chart (1995)	Position
France Airplay (SNEP)	33
US Billboard Hot 100	94

== Release history ==
Region	Date	Format(s)	Label(s)	Ref.
United States	February 7, 1995	—N/a	Motown	
Australia	March 3, 1995	CD; cassette	Motown; Polydor	
Japan	March 13, 1995	Mini-CD	Motown	
