= I'm Ready (Tevin Campbell album) =

Studio album by Tevin Campbell
- Released: October 26, 1993
- Studio: Doppler (Atlanta, Georgia) Ocean Way, Larrabee, Elumba, Record Plant (Los Angeles, California) Tarpan (San Rafael, California) Louis Biancaniello's Homesite 13 (Novato, California) Quad (New York City) Encore (Burbank, California) Olympic (London)
- Genres: R&B; new jack swing; soul
- Length: 49:22
- Labels: Qwest; Warner Bros.
- Producers: Babyface; Prince; Daryl Simmons; Narada Michael Walden

Tevin Campbell chronology
T.E.V.I.N. (1991)	I'm Ready (1993)	Back to the World (1996)

Singles from I'm Ready
- 1. "Can We Talk" Released: September 21, 1993; 2. "Shhh" Released: 1993; 3. "I'm Ready" Released: February 1994; 4. "Always in My Heart" Released: 1994; 5. "Don't Say Goodbye Girl" Released: November 1994; 6. "Brown Eyed Girl" Released: July 1995

I'm Ready is the second studio album by American singer Tevin Campbell. It was released in the United States by Qwest Records on October 26, 1993. Feeling pressured to deliver a successful follow-up to his 1991 debut T.E.V.I.N., Campbell took greater creative and vocal control, reteaming with returning producer Narada Michael Walden and singer Prince who each contributed four tracks to the album, while Babyface co-produced three tracks with Daryl Simmons.

The album earned generally favorable reviews from music critics, who praised I'm Ready for its strong songwriting and Campbell's mature and versatile vocals. Commercially, the album outperformed its predecessor. It opened at number 18 on the US Billboard 200, selling 1.7 million copies, while going 2× Platinum. The album also peaked at number 14 in Australia, where it reached Gold status. I'm Ready was nominated for a Grammy Award in the Best R&B Album category.

I'm Ready was promoted through several singles between 1993 and 1994, led by the breakthrough hit "Can We Talk" which reached the top ten on the US Billboard Hot 100, topped the R&B chart, and achieved international success. The album also produced further hits, including "Shhh," the title track "I'm Ready," and "Always in My Heart," all of which charted on the Billboard Hot 100 and R&B charts, while "Don't Say Goodbye Girl" received more limited success.

== Background ==
When Campbell started working on I'm Ready late in 1992, he was still just 16, yet already felt significant pressure to deliver a successful follow-up. This time, he exercised much greater vocal and creative control, collaborating closely with each producer to craft songs and emotions that truly resonated with him. During pre-production, Campbell's team ditched many of the producers on T.E.V.I.N., including Al B. Sure! and Arthur Baker. Narada Michael Walden, however, stayed on board and became one of the album's key holdovers, once again contributing four songs. Campbell's mother Rhonda urged to add Babyface, who would go on to contribute three track to the album along with Daryl Simmons.

While Prince had contributed one song to T.E.V.I.N., he now took on a much larger role, also coaching Campbell. Credited as Paisley Park for his contributions to the album as a songwriter, arranger, and producer, Campbell originally sought Prince to produce the entire album, but the collaboration ultimately failed to materialize because he was unable to reach a financial agreement with the label. Titled after its second single, Campbell initially considered naming the album Young, Gifted and Black, but ultimately abandoned the idea after deciding not to record THE same-titled song from Aretha Franklin's 1972 album, which he had originally planned to include on the project.

== Promotion ==
I'm Ready was supported by several singles released between 1993 and 1994. The first single, "Can We Talk," became the album’s biggest success, reaching number 9 on the US Billboard Hot 100 and topping the US R&B chart. The song also achieved international recognition, reaching the charts in Australia, New Zealand, and the United Kingdom, and earned Gold certifications from the Recording Industry Association of America (RIAA) and Australian Recording Industry Association (ARIA), as well as a Silver certification from the British Phonographic Industry (BPI).

Following the success of "Can We Talk," "Shhh" was released as a follow-up single and reached number 45 on the Billboard Hot 100 and number 8 on the US R&B chart. The album's title track, "I'm Ready," was released in 1994 and became another major hit, peaking at number 9 on the Billboard Hot 100 and number 2 on the R&B chart. It also received a Gold certification in New Zealand. Additional singles from the album included "Always in My Heart," which reached number 20 on the Billboard Hot 100 and number 6 on the R&B chart, as well as "Don't Say Goodbye Girl," which received more limited chart attention.

== Critical reception ==
Professional ratings
Review scores
Source	Rating
AllMusic	4/5 stars
Entertainment Weekly	A−
Los Angeles Times	3.5/4 stars

Connie Johnson, writing for The Los Angeles Times, found that I'm Ready was "totally free of filler" and added: "This 10-song package contains first-rate songs by Prince, Babyface and Narada Michael Walden." She called "Uncle Sam" and the "three other songs Prince contributed are the strongest and steamiest on the album. Although his background is heavily church-oriented, Campbell manages to sound comfortable in this racier setting. Elsewhere on the record [he] never takes a false step." Washington Post critic Geoffrey Himes called I'm Ready a "superb second album." He also cited Prince's "songs as the album’s four best tracks" and complimented Campbell for his "astonishingly mature vocal," which de described as "smart and angry but free of whining or ranting." While he found Walden's four songs "not as impressive but are perfectly respectable," he declared Daryl Simmons and Babyface's songs equally good.

Entertainment Weekly gave the album an A− rating, writing that "Campbell's voice, even at 16, is still cotton-candy sweet," while Vibe editor Christian Wright remarked that I'm Ready was "Campbell's coming of age. Particularly on the smooth ballads, he shines. At the end of "Can We Talk," his voice soars, then flutters like a feather in a light breeze." Lynn Norment from Ebony remarked that "Campbell delivers the smooth vocals and danceable rhythms that his fans have come to expect and love [...] With this recording, executive produced by Quincy Jones and Benny Medina, the talented young singer demonstrates that the title song, "I'm Ready," is not an empty boast." In a retrospective review for AllMusic, editor Craig Lytle noted that "Campbell emerged as a true soul singer with I'm Ready, his second album. The Texas native had the good fortune of working with some of the best producers and writers in the business to construct an excellent work [...] There is much to savor on this album." Lytle rated the album four ouf of five stars.

== Accolades ==
The album earned three Grammy Award nominations, including Best Male R&B Vocal Performance ("Can We Talk") at the 36th Annual Grammy Awards and Best Male R&B Vocal Performance ("I'm Ready"), and Best R&B Album at the 37th awards ceremony.

== Commercial performance ==
In the United States, I'm Ready debuted and peaked at number 18 on the Billboard 200 in the week of November 13, 1993. It marked Campbell's first top 20 entry on the chart. The album also opened at number four on Billboard's Top R&B/Hip-Hop Albums charts, peaking at number three in its fourth week on the chart. I'm Ready was certified Gold by the Recording Industry Association of America (RIAA) on January 12, 1994, and reached Platinum status on February 10 and double Platinum status on September 8 of the same year. According to Billboard magazine the album sold 1,100,000 copies in 1994, becoming one of the best selling albums of that year. By June 1996, it had sold over 1.7 million copies domestically. Billboard ranked it fifth on its 1994 Top R&B/Hip-Hop Albums year-end chart. Elsewhere, the album reached number 14 on the Australian Albums Chart. In 1995, it was cerified Gold by Australian Recording Industry Association (ARIA) for shipment figures in excess of 35,000 units.

== Track listing ==
I'm Ready track listing
No.	Title	Writer(s)	Producer(s)	Length
1.	"Can We Talk"	Babyface; Daryl Simmons	Babyface; Simmons	4:44
2.	"Don't Say Goodbye Girl"	Burt Bacharach; Sally Jo Dakota; Narada Michael Walden	Walden; Louis Biancaniello^{[a]}	4:30
3.	"Interlude"			0:13
4.	"The Halls of Desire"	Prince	Prince	4:34
5.	"I'm Ready"	Babyface	Babyface; Simmons	4:45
6.	"What Do I Say"	Dakota; Johnny Gill; Walden	Walden; Mike Mani^{[a]}; Monty Seward^{[a]}	4:55
7.	"Uncle Sam"	Prince; Paula Sherield	Prince; Kirk Johnson^{[b]}	3:57
8.	"Interlude"			0:29
9.	"Paris 1798430"	Prince	Prince	3:37
10.	"Always in My Heart"	Babyface; Simmons	Babyface; Simmons	5:40
11.	"Interlude"			0:09
12.	"Shhh"	Prince	Prince	4:55
13.	"Brown Eyed Girl"	Campbell; Dakota; Walden	Walden; Biancaniello^{[a]}	4:01
14.	"Infant Child"	Walden	Walden	2:49
Total length:				49:22

Notes

- ^{^[a]} denotes an associate producer
- ^{^[a]} denotes an additional producer

== Personnel ==
Credits adapted from album's liner notes.

- Eric Anest – engineer (tracks 4, 7, 9)
- Michael B. – drums (tracks 4, 12)
- Babyface – producer, instruments, and background vocals (tracks 1, 5, 10)
- Tommy Barbarella – keyboards (tracks 4, 12)
- Louis Biancaniello – associate producer, keyboards, programming, and synthesizer arrangements (tracks 2, 13)
- Vernon "Ice" Black – acoustic guitar (track 6)
- Atlanta Bliss – horns (tracks 4, 9, 12)
- Nicole Bradin – background vocals (track 14)
- Michael Brauer – mixing (tracks 4, 7, 9, 12)
- Tevin Campbell – lead vocals (tracks 1, 2, 4–7, 9, 10, 12–14), background vocals (tracks 1, 5, 10)
- Milton Chan – assistant engineer (track 10)
- Bruck Dawit – assistant mix engineer (tracks 4, 7, 9, 12)
- David Eike – assistant engineer (track 6)
- David "Frazeman" Frazer – mixing and vocal engineer (tracks 2, 6, 13, 14)
- Lori Fumar – assistant engineer (track 10)
- Tom Garneau – engineer (tracks 4, 9)
- Nikita Germaine – background vocals (track 14)
- Brad Gilderman – engineer (track 10)
- Preston Glass – sitar (track 6), background vocals (track 14)
- William "DJ" Graves – scratches (track 4)
- Sandy Griffith – background vocals (track 14)
- Ray Hahnfeldt – engineer (tracks 4, 7), additional engineering (track 12)
- Jerry Hey – conductor and string arrangements (track 6)
- Charlie Hunter – electric guitar (track 6)
- Skyler Jett – background vocals (track 14)
- Kathleen Johnson – background vocals (tracks 7, 12)
- Kirk Johnson – additional production (track 7), percussion (track 4)
- Quincy Jones – executive producer
- Ellen Keating – background vocals (track 14)
- Janice Lee – production coordinator (tracks 2, 6, 13, 14)
- Eric Leeds – horns and horn arrangements (tracks 4, 9, 12)
- Tony Lindsay – background vocals (track 14)
- Mike Mani – associate producer, keyboards, and programming (track 6)
- Frank "Killer Bee" Martin – synthesized strings (track 14)
- Leslie Matthews – background vocals (track 14)
- Benny Medina – executive producer
- Steve Noonan – engineer (tracks 4, 9, 12)
- Barney Perkins – mixing (track 10)
- Prince – producer, arranger, and executive producer (tracks 4, 7, 9, 12)
- Marc "Elvis" Reyburn – engineer (tracks 2, 6, 13, 14)
- Claytoven Richardson – background vocals (track 14)
- Rail Rogut – assistant engineer (tracks 1, 5, 10), strings engineer (track 6)
- Matt Rohr – assistant engineer (tracks 2, 6, 13, 14)
- Marc Russo – soprano saxophone (track 13)
- Levi Seacer Jr. – guitar (track 4)
- Monty Seward – associate producer, keyboards, and programming (track 6)
- Cynthia Shiloh – production coordinator (tracks 2, 6, 13, 14)
- Daryl Simmons – producer (tracks 1, 5, 10)
- Ivy Skoff – production coordinator (tracks 1, 5, 10)
- Donnell Sullivan – engineer (tracks 1, 5)
- Sonny T. – bass (tracks 4, 12)
- Jeanie Tracy – background vocals (track 14)
- Kevin Walden – production coordinator (tracks 2, 6, 13, 14)
- Narada Michael Walden – producer and arranger (tracks 2, 6, 13, 14), rhythm and vocal arrangements (tracks 2, 6), piano (track 14)
- Randy Walker – MIDI technician (tracks 1, 5, 10)
- Steve Warner – assistant engineer (tracks 1, 5)
- Dave Way – mixing (tracks 1, 5)
- Ulrich Wild – assistant engineer (tracks 1, 5)
- Jim "Z" Zumpano – engineer (tracks 1, 5)

== Charts ==
=== Weekly charts ===
Weekly chart performance for I'm Ready
Chart (1993–94)	Peak position
Australian Albums (ARIA)	14
US Billboard 200	18
US Top R&B/Hip-Hop Albums (Billboard)	3

=== Year-end charts ===
1993 year-end chart performance for I'm Ready
Chart (1993)	Position
US Top R&B/Hip-Hop Albums (Billboard)	92

1994 year-end chart performance for I'm Ready
Chart (1994)	Position
US Billboard 200	44
US Top R&B/Hip-Hop Albums (Billboard)	5

== Certifications ==
Certifications for I'm Ready
Region	Certification	Certified units/sales
Australia (ARIA)	Gold	35,000^{^}
United States (RIAA)	2× Platinum	2,000,000^{^}
^{^} Shipments figures based on certification alone.

== Release history ==
I'm Ready release history
Region	Date	Format	Label	Ref(s)
United States	October 26, 1993	CD; cassette	Qwest; Warner Bros.	
Japan	November 10, 1993	CD; cassette	Qwest; Warner Bros.	
