= I Got It Bad (Tevin Campbell song) =

Single by Tevin Campbell

from the album Back to the World
- Released: August 12, 1996
- Length: 5:04
- Label: Qwest
- Songwriter(s): Tevin Campbell; Keith Crouch; Kipper Jones
- Producer(s): Keith Crouch

Tevin Campbell singles chronology
| "Back to the World" (1996) | "I Got It Bad" (1996) | "Could You Learn to Love" (1997) |

"I Got It Bad" is a song by American R&B singer Tevin Campbell. It was written by Campbell, Keith Crouch, and Kipper Jones for his Back to the World (1996), while production was overseen by Crouch. The song was released by Qwest Records as the album's second single in August 1996. It peaked at number 41 on the US Hot R&B/Hip-Hop Songs chart and reached the top fifty in New Zealand.

== Critical reception ==
Billboard editor Larry Flick found that "I Got It Bad" continued to "illustrate how much this young prodigy has matured [...] Campbell pulls off the song with convincing ease. His performance, matched with producer/writer Keith Crouch's insinuating old-school soul shuffle, ultimately makes this a far more viable multiformat contender than anything he has offered in recent months." DRUM described the song as "a laid-back tune that grabs you the first time you hear it," while Entertainment Weekly wrote that "when the groove gets lowdown and funky on "I Got It Bad," he sounds sexier than any 19-year-old has a right to." Less impressed, Elysa Gardner from The Los Angeles Times declared the song a "cliche."

== Commercial performance ==
In the United States, "I Got It Bad" failed to chart on the US Billboard Hot 100. It however peaked at number 41 on the Hot R&B/Hip-Hop Songs chart. The song also reached number 49 on the R&B/Hip-Hop Airplay chart and number 26 on the US Adult R&B Songs chart. Elsewhere, "I Got It Bad" also peaked at number 50 on the New Zealand Singles Chart.

== Music video ==
A music video for "I Got It Bad" was directed by Francis Lawrence. Filming took place in the Bradbury Building in downtown Los Angeles, California, a five-story office building that is best known for its extraordinary skylit atrium of access walkways, stairs and elevators, and their ornate ironwork.

== Track listings ==
US CD single
| No. | Title | Writer(s) | Producer(s) | Length |
|---|---|---|---|---|
| 1. | "I Got It Bad" | Tevin Campbell; Keith Crouch; Kipper Jones | Crouch | 5:00 |
| 2. | "Back to the World" (clean remix edit) | Jamey Jaz; Rahsaan Patterson; Mikelyn Roderick | Jaz; Jon B.^{[a]} | 3:51 |

Japanese CD single
| No. | Title | Writer(s) | Producer(s) | Length |
|---|---|---|---|---|
| 1. | "I Got It Bad" | Campbell; Crouch; Jones | Crouch | 5:03 |
| 2. | "Lately" | Stevie Wonder | Al B. Sure! | 4:24 |
| 3. | "Knocks Me Off My Feet" | Stevie Wonder | D'Wayne Wiggins; Timothy Christian Riley | 3:29 |
| 4. | "Back to the World" (Master Mix instrumental) | Jamey Jaz; Rahsaan Patterson; Mikelyn Roderick | Jaz; Jon B.^{[a]} | 6:31 |

Notes

- ^{^[a]} denotes additional producer

== Credits and personnel ==
Credits lifted from the liner notes of Back to the World.

- Tevin Campbell – executive producer, vocals
- Keith Crouch – producer, recording, writer
- Booker T. Jones – mixing
- Kipper Jones – background vocals, writer
- Eugene Lo – engineer
- Glenn McKinney – guitar

== Charts ==
Weekly chart performance for "I Got It Bad"
| Chart (1996) | Peak position |
|---|---|
| New Zealand (Recorded Music NZ) | 50 |
| US Hot R&B/Hip-Hop Songs (Billboard) | 41 |
