= On Bended Knee =

1994 single by Boyz II Men

Single by Boyz II Men

from the album II
- B-side: "I'll Make Love to You" (remix – sexy version); "Al Final del Camino"
- Released: November 1, 1994
- Genre: R&B-pop
- Length: 5:29
- Label: Motown
- Songwriter: Jimmy Jam and Terry Lewis
- Producers: Jimmy Jam and Terry Lewis

Boyz II Men singles chronology
"I'll Make Love to You" (1994)	"On Bended Knee" (1994)	"Thank You" (1995)

Music video
- "On Bended Knee" on YouTube

"On Bended Knee" is a song by American R&B group Boyz II Men for the Motown label. It was written and produced by Jimmy Jam and Terry Lewis, and released in November 1994 by Motown as the second single from the group's second album, II (1994). In the lyrics of the song, the speaker begs "on bended knee" for his ex-lover to come back to him, and apologizes for his wrongdoing.

In the United States, the song replaced Boyz II Men's previous single, "I'll Make Love to You", at number one on the Billboard Hot 100. This was the first time that an act had replaced itself at number one since the Beatles, when "I Want to Hold Your Hand", "She Loves You", and "Can't Buy Me Love" monopolized the top of the chart for a total of 14 weeks. "On Bended Knee" additionally reached number one in Canada and entered the top 10 in Australia, New Zealand, Panama, and the United Kingdom.

== Composition ==
Sheet music for "On Bended Knee" shows a slow tempo of 60 beats per minute and the song starts in the key of A♭ major for the intro, then modulates to E♭ major for most of the song, but is also modulated to E major for the third chorus, then to F major for the final chorus, and then again to B♭ major for the outro.

== Critical reception ==
Larry Flick from Billboard magazine complimented the song as a "lovely pop/R&B ballad". He added, "The single has all the right ingredients: tight harmonies, white-knuckled lead vocals, a slow and grinding urban groove, and words of undying love." Music Week stated, "More elaborate and exquisite harmonies from these undeniably talented youngsters on a lilting song written and produced by Jimmy Jam and Terry Lewis. Destined for mid-chart respectability." Gerald Martinez from New Sunday Times wrote that the song, along with its predecessor "I'll Make Love to You", "tries to recapture the magic of 'End of the Road', and they come close. Big production numbers with solid hooks, they should be flooding our airwaves for the next few months." Paul Evans from Rolling Stone named it a "lush swoon-and-croon" ballad "of the kind the Boyz' hard-core fans demand." Pete Stanton from Smash Hits gave it a score of three out of five in his review of the single.

== Music video ==
The music video for "On Bended Knee", directed by American director Lionel C. Martin, featured the Boyz II Men band members and their breakup and eventual reconciliation with four famous actresses: Kim Fields, Renée Jones, Lark Voorhies, and Victoria Rowell. The video was filmed in New Orleans, Louisiana. It includes footage from Audubon Park, a streetcar, and the French Quarter.

The video begins with Wanyá Morris' girlfriend (Voorhies) in the car with him, accusing him of looking at another woman at the grocery store, and she gets out of the car, leaving Morris alone. He eventually finds her sitting on bleachers where they make up. Shawn Stockman meets a girl (Rowell) with a dog at the park and falls in love with her after just meeting her. Michael McCary gets into a fight with his girlfriend (Jones) on his birthday and he's shown alone, drawing a picture of her, but then she comes back to him. Nathan Morris is shown concentrating more on writing music than spending time with his girlfriend (Fields), which frustrates her so she writes a breakup note on his mirror and leaves him, but she eventually returns to him. The band appears singing on the subway and in the rain.

== Track listings ==
- US maxi-CD single
1. "On Bended Knee" (human rhythm remix) – 5:29
2. "On Bended Knee" (swingamix) – 5:26
3. "On Bended Knee" (LP version) – 5:29
4. "On Bended Knee" (human rhythm remix instrumental) – 5:29
5. "I'll Make Love to You" (remix – sexy version) – 4:33
- German single
1. "On Bended Knee" (radio edit) – 4:33
2. "End of the Road" (pop edit) – 3:39
- Europe maxi-CD single
1. "On Bended Knee" (radio edit) – 4:33
2. "On Bended Knee" (LP version) – 5:29
3. "End of the Road" (pop edit) – 3:39
4. "Al Final del Camino" ("End of the Road" – Spanish version) – 5:50

== Charts ==
=== Weekly charts ===
Weekly chart performance for "On Bended Knee"
Chart (1994–1995)	Peak position
Australia (ARIA)	7
Belgium (Ultratop 50 Flanders)	20
Brazil (UPI)	10
Canada Retail Singles (The Record)	2
Canada Contemporary Hit Radio (The Record)	1
Canada Top Singles (RPM)	1
Canada Adult Contemporary (RPM)	8
Europe (Eurochart Hot 100)	68
Europe (European AC Radio)	8
Europe (European Hit Radio)	18
France (SNEP)	34
France Airplay (SNEP)	18
Germany (GfK)	63
Iceland (Íslenski Listinn Topp 40)	25
Ireland (IRMA)	24
Israel (Israeli Singles Chart)	28
Netherlands (Dutch Top 40)	18
Netherlands (Single Top 100)	21
New Zealand (Recorded Music NZ)	4
Panama (UPI)	2
Scottish Singles Sales (Official Charts)	57
UK Singles (Official Charts)	20
UK Airplay (Music Week)	21
UK Hip Hop/R&B (Official Charts)	6
US Billboard Hot 100	1
US Adult Contemporary (Billboard)	8
US Dance Singles Sales (Billboard)	37
US Hot R&B/Hip-Hop Songs (Billboard)	2
US Pop Airplay (Billboard)	1
US Rhythmic Airplay (Billboard)	1
US Cash Box Top 100	1

=== Year-end charts ===
Year-end chart performance for "On Bended Knee"
Chart (1995)	Position
Brazil (Crowley)	21
Canada Top Singles (RPM)	12
Canada Adult Contemporary (RPM)	84
US Billboard Hot 100	5
US Adult Contemporary (Billboard)	23
US Hot R&B Singles (Billboard)	12
US Top 40/Mainstream (Billboard)	8
US Top 40/Rhythm-Crossover (Billboard)	5
US Cash Box Top 100	3

=== Decade-end charts ===
Decade-end chart performance for "On Bended Knee"
Chart (1990–1999)	Position
US Billboard Hot 100	14

== Certifications ==
Certifications for "On Bended Knee"
Region	Certification	Certified units/sales
New Zealand (RMNZ)	Platinum	30,000^{‡}
United States (RIAA)	3× Platinum	3,000,000^{‡}
^{‡} Sales+streaming figures based on certification alone.

== Release history ==
Release dates and formats for "On Bended Knee"
Region	Date	Format(s)	Label(s)	Ref.
United States	November 1, 1994	7-inch vinyl; CD; cassette	Motown	
United Kingdom	November 14, 1994	7-inch vinyl; CD; cassette	Motown	
Australia	November 28, 1994	CD; cassette	Motown	
Japan	December 1, 1994	Mini-CD	Motown	
