= 12 Gauge (12 Gauge album) =

Studio album by 12 Gauge
- Released: May 20, 1994
- Recorded: 1993–1994
- Genres: Hip hop, Miami bass
- Length: 46:36
- Label: Scotti Bros.
- Producers: Doug Grigsby, David Michery, Lea Reis

12 Gauge chronology
12 Gauge (1994)	Let Me Ride Again (1995)

Singles from 12 Gauge
- 1. "Dunkie Butt" Released: October 7, 1993

12 Gauge is the self-titled debut album by 12 Gauge, released on May 20, 1994, through Scotti Bros. Records.

The album is best known for its lead single and 12 Gauge's only top 40 hit, "Dunkie Butt". The single spent 21 weeks on the Billboard Hot 100, peaking at No. 28 and was certified gold by the RIAA for sales of 500,000 copies. The album reached No. 141 on the Billboard 200, and No. 44 on the Top R&B Albums chart, the only one of his three albums to reach the Billboard charts. After the Zomba Music Group purchased the Scotti Bros. label, the album was re-released in 1998.

== Track listing ==
No.	Title	Length
1.	"Dunkie Butt"	4:18
2.	"U Go Girl"	3:59
3.	"Lay You Down"	5:46
4.	"Bend Over (Ooh Lord)"	3:32
5.	"I Got a Thing for You"	3:24
6.	"Ghetto Freakin"	3:54
7.	"Freestyle"	4:39
8.	"Rump"	4:55
9.	"Brother's Keeper"	4:10
10.	"Grip Ya Hips"	4:07
11.	"Freak It"	3:52

== Charts ==
Chart (1994)	Peak position
Billboard 200	141
Billboard Top R&B Albums	44
Billboard Top Heatseekers	3
