= Don't Say Goodbye Girl =

Single by Tevin Campbell

from the album I'm Ready
- Released: November 1994
- Length: 4:29
- Label: Qwest
- Songwriter(s): Burt Bacharach; Sally Jo Dakota; Narada Michael Walden
- Producer(s): Narada Michael Walden; Louis Biancaniello

Tevin Campbell singles chronology
"Always in My Heart" (1994)	"Don't Say Goodbye Girl" (1994)	"Brown Eyed Girl" (1995)

"Don't Say Goodbye Girl" is a song by American R&B singer Tevin Campbell. It was written by Burt Bacharach, Sally Jo Dakota, and Narada Michael Walden for his second studio album I'm Ready (1993), while production was helmed by the latter along with Louis Biancaniello. The song was released as the album's fourth single, reaching number 71 on the US Billboard Hot 100 and number 28 on the Hot R&B/Hip-Hop Songs chart.

== Track listings ==
US CD / cassette single
No.	Title	Writer(s)	Producer(s)	Length
1.	"Don't Say Goodbye Girl" (Album Version)	Burt Bacharach; Sally Jo Dakota; Narada Michael Walden	Walden; Louis Biancaniello^{[a]}	4:30
2.	"The Halls of Desire" (Remix)	Prince	Prince; Larry Robinson^{[b]}	3:46

Notes

- ^{^[a]} denotes associate producer
- ^{^[b]} denotes additional producer

== Credits and personnel ==
Credits adapted from liner notes.

- Tevin Campbell – lead and background vocals
- Narada Michael Walden – writer, composer, producer and arranger
- Burt Bacharach – writer, composer
- Sally Jo Dakota – writer, composer
- Louis "Kingpin" Biancaniello – associate producer, keyboards, programming and synth arrangements
- David "Frazeman" Frazer – recording and mixing engineer
- Marc "Elvis" Reyburn – recording engineer
- Matt Rohr – assistant engineer
- Janice Lee, Cynthia Shiloh and Kevin Walden – production coordinators

== Charts ==
Weekly chart performance for "Don't Say Goodbye Girl"
Chart (1995)	Peak position
US Billboard Hot 100	71
US Hot R&B/Hip-Hop Songs (Billboard)	28
US Rhythmic (Billboard)	21
