= Dunkie Butt (Please Please Please) =

Single by 12 Gauge

from the album 12 Gauge
- Released: October 7, 1993
- Recorded: 1993
- Genre: Hip hop
- Length: 4:18
- Label: Scotti Brothers
- Songwriter: 12 Gauge
- Producers: Doug Grigsby, David Michery

"Dunkie Butt" was the lead single released from American rapper 12 Gauge's debut album, 12 Gauge (1994). One of many Miami bass influenced hits in the early to mid 1990s, "Dunkie Butt (Please Please Please)" was released in late 1993 and spent 21 weeks on the US Billboard Hot 100, eventually peaking at 28 in April of the following year. The song was certified gold by the RIAA on April 11, 1994 and sold 600,000 copies. "Dunkie Butt" was the rapper's only top 40 hit, making him a one-hit wonder.

== Single track listing ==
=== A-Side ===
1. "Dunkie Butt" (Radio Version)- 4:19
2. "Dunkie Butt" (Album Version)- 4:26

=== B-Side ===
1. "Dunkie Butt" (Funky Bass Mix)- 4:44
2. "Dunkie Butt" (Club Mix)- 4:44
3. "Dunkie Butt" (Instrumental)- 4:32

== Charts ==
=== Weekly charts ===
Chart (1994)	Peak position
US Billboard Hot 100	28
US Hot R&B Singles & Tracks (Billboard)	28
US Hot Rap Singles (Billboard)	3
US Rhythmic Top 40 (Billboard)	37
US Hot Dance Music/Maxi-Singles Sales (Billboard)	30
US Cash Box Top 100	30

=== Year-end charts ===
Chart (1994)	Position
US Billboard Hot 100	27
