= 12 Gauge (rapper) =

American rapper, singer, and DJ (born 1968)

- Born: Isiah Pinkney; 1968 (age 57–58); Augusta, Georgia, U.S.
- Genres: Hip hop
- Occupations: Rapper; singer; DJ
- Years active: 1993–present
- Labels: Scotti Bros.; Roadrunner

Isiah Pinkney (born 1968), known professionally as 12 Gauge, is an American rapper, singer, and DJ.

He started out as a DJ, moving to rapping in the early 1990s, releasing three full-length albums. He is best known for his only top 40 single, "Dunkie Butt", which peaked at 28 on the Billboard Hot 100 and earned a gold certification.

== Discography ==
- 12 Gauge (Scotti Bros., 1994) US Billboard 200 peak #141, US R&B peak #44
- Let Me Ride Again (Scotti Bros., 1995)
- Freaky One (Roadrunner Records, 1998)
- Da Shotgun Kid (Catapult Records., 2009)

== Single ==
- "Dunkie Butt (Please Please Please)" - Billboard Hot 100 peak #28, Hot Rap Singles peak #3
