= Always in My Heart (Tevin Campbell song) =

Single by Tevin Campbell

from the album I'm Ready
- Released: 1994
- Length: 5:31
- Label: Qwest
- Songwriter(s): Babyface; Daryl Simmons
- Producer(s): Babyface; Daryl Simmons

Tevin Campbell singles chronology
"I'm Ready" (1994)	"Always in My Heart" (1994)	"Don't Say Goodbye Girl" (1994)

"Always in My Heart" is a song by American R&B singer Tevin Campbell. It was written and produced by Babyface and Daryl Simmons for Campbell's second album I'm Ready (1993). Released by Qwest Records as the album's third single, it became his third straight single from to hit the top 20 on the US Billboard Hot 100 and the top 10 of the US Hot R&B/Hip-Hop Songs chart.

== Music video ==
An accompanying music video for "Always in My Heart" was directed by German film director Marcus Nispel. It was filmed in New York City in June 1994.

== Track listings ==
All tracks written by Babyface and Daryl Simmons.

US CD / cassette single
No.	Title	Producer(s)	Length
1.	"Always in My Heart" (Edit)	Babyface; Simmons	4:29
2.	"Always in My Heart" (Album Version)	Babyface; Simmons	5:38

German maxi single
No.	Title	Producer(s)	Length
1.	"Always in My Heart" (Album Edit)	Babyface; Simmons	4:29
2.	"Always in My Heart" (Full Body Remix)	Babyface; Simmons; Allen Gordon, Jr.^{[a]}	4:29
3.	"Always in My Heart" (Album Version)	Babyface; Simmons	5:38

Notes

- ^{^[a]} denotes additional producer

== Credits and personnel ==
Credits adapted from liner notes.

- Tevin Campbell – lead and background vocals
- Babyface – writer, composer, producer, all music and background vocals
- Daryl Simmons – writer, composer and producer
- Randy Walker – MIDI technician
- Brad Gilderman – recording engineer
- Milton Chan, Lori Fumar, Rail Rogut – assistant engineers
- Barney Perkins – mixing engineer
- Ivy Skoff – production coordinator

== Charts ==
=== Weekly charts ===
Weekly chart performance for "Always in My Heart"
Chart (1994)	Peak position
Australia (ARIA)	60
New Zealand (Recorded Music NZ)	13
US Billboard Hot 100	20
US Hot R&B/Hip-Hop Songs (Billboard)	6
US Rhythmic (Billboard)	3

=== Year-end charts ===
Year-end chart performance for "Always in My Heart"
Chart (1994)	Position
US Billboard Hot 100	96
US Hot R&B/Hip-Hop Songs (Billboard)	41
