= I'm Ready (Tevin Campbell song) =

Single by Tevin Campbell

from the album I'm Ready
- Released: February 1994
- Length: 4:46
- Label: Qwest
- Songwriter(s): Babyface
- Producer(s): Babyface; Daryl Simmons

Tevin Campbell singles chronology
"Can We Talk" (1993)	"I'm Ready" (1994)	"Always in My Heart" (1994)

"I'm Ready" is a song by American singer Tevin Campbell. It was written by Babyface for Campbell's second studio album of the same name while production was helmed by Babyface and Daryl Simmons. Released as the album's second single, it became a success on both the pop and R&B charts, reaching the top-ten in New Zealand and on the US Billboard Hot 100 as well as the top-five on the Hot R&B/Hip-Hop Songs chart. "I'm Ready" was nominated for a Grammy Award for Best Male R&B Vocal Performance at the 37th awards ceremony.

== Music video ==
An accompanying music video for "I'm Ready" was filmed by German film director Marcus Nispel.

== Track listings ==
US CD / cassette single
No.	Title	Writer(s)	Producer(s)	Length
1.	"I'm Ready" (Album Version)	Babyface	Babyface; Daryl Simmons	4:45
2.	"I'm Ready" (Instrumental)	Babyface	Babyface; Simmons	4:46

German CD maxi-single
No.	Title	Writer(s)	Producer(s)	Length
1.	"I'm Ready" (Album Version)	Babyface	Babyface; Simmons	4:10
2.	"I'm Ready" (Instrumental)	Babyface	Babyface; Simmons	4:45
3.	"Can We Talk" (Full Remix)	Babyface	Babyface; Simmons; Def Def & Meech Wells^{[a]}	4:56

Notes

- ^{^[a]} denotes additional producer

== Credits and personnel ==
Credits adapted from liner notes.

- Tevin Campbell – lead and background vocals
- Babyface – writer, composer, producer, all music and background vocals
- Daryl Simmons – producer
- Randy Walker – MIDI technician
- Jim Zumpano, Donnell Sullivan – recording engineers
- Rail Rogut, Steve Warner, Ulrich Wild – assistant engineers
- Dave Way – mixing engineer
- Ivy Skoff – production coordinator

== Charts ==
=== Weekly charts ===
Weekly chart performance for "I'm Ready"
Chart (1994)	Peak position
Australia (ARIA)	21
New Zealand (Recorded Music NZ)	9
US Billboard Hot 100	9
US Hot R&B/Hip-Hop Songs (Billboard)	2
US Pop Airplay (Billboard)	13
US Rhythmic (Billboard)	2

=== Year-end charts ===
Year-end chart performance for "I'm Ready"
Chart (1994)	Position
US Billboard Hot 100	45
US Hot R&B Singles (Billboard)	12
US Cash Box Top 100	29

== Certifications and sales ==
Certifications for "I'm Ready"
Region	Certification	Certified units/sales
New Zealand (RMNZ)	Gold	5,000^{*}
^{*} Sales figures based on certification alone.
