= I'll Make Love to You =

1994 single by Boyz II Men

Single by Boyz II Men

from the album II
- Released: July 26, 1994
- Genre: Pop; R&B; soul
- Length: 3:56
- Label: Motown
- Songwriter: Babyface
- Producer: Babyface

Boyz II Men singles chronology
"Let It Snow" (1993)	"I'll Make Love to You" (1994)	"On Bended Knee" (1994)

Music video
- "I'll Make Love to You" on YouTube

Audio sample
- "I'll Make Love to You": file; help

"I'll Make Love to You" is a song by American R&B group Boyz II Men for the Motown label. Written and produced by Babyface, it was released on July 26, 1994, as the lead single from the group's second album, II (1994). The song was a commercial success, spending 14 weeks atop the US Billboard Hot 100. It was also the third best performing song in the 1990s on Billboard, as well as ranking on Billboard Greatest of All-Time chart. "I'll Make Love to You" won the Grammy Award for Best R&B Performance by a Duo or Group with Vocals and was nominated for Record of the Year at the 37th Annual Grammy Awards. Its accompanying music video was directed by Lionel C. Martin and received a nomination at the 1994 Billboard Music Video Awards.

== Reception ==
=== Critical reception ===
Larry Flick from Billboard magazine described "I'll Make Love to You" as a "sweeping pop/R&B ballad". He wrote further, "Silky harmonies waft over a well-measured arrangement chock-ful of bright, glistening synths and soft-yet-punctuating percussion. Lovely sing-along chorus initially will remind many of past glories, but single ultimately will provide a refreshing cool breeze to any of numerous radio formats it graces." Troy J. Augusto from Cash Box named it Pick of the Week, declaring it as "a lushly-arranged, slowly-paced ballad", "full of the same charming vocal harmonies and natural soul that gives the group its universal pop appeal. Ready to explode at urban, A/C and Top 40, this cut leads a parade of future hit singles that should keep the Boyz in chart heaven all through the night and all through the year."

In his weekly UK chart commentary, James Masterton deemed it "another piece of immaculate close-harmony soul", that "is a smash before it has ever started". Pan-European magazine Music & Media commented, "Silkier then the First Lady's nightgown, the first single off the "mommy" Boyz's upcoming album II further secures their position as the masters of the close harmony ballad." Alan Jones from Music Week also named it Pick of the Week, rating it four out of five. He wrote, "Returning after more than a year, Boyz II Men get back into the "End of the Road" groove with a silky, powerful ballad penned by Babyface. Its sweeping majesty is likely to push it high into the chart." Gerald Martinez from New Sunday Times felt the song, along with "On Bended Knee", "tries to recapture the magic of 'End of the Road', and they come close. Big production numbers with solid hooks, they should be flooding our airwaves for the next few months." Paul Evans from Rolling Stone viewed it as a "lush swoon-and-croon" ballad "of the kind the Boyz' hard-core fans demand." Mark Sutherland from Smash Hits gave it three out of five, saying, "Weeell, in their favour are the facts that they are still the meanest warblers in pop and that soul doesn't come much more silky or supersmooth than this. Against them is the fact that this is basically just 'End of the Road' with new lyrics – and blimmin' presumptuous lyrics at that."

=== Chart performance ===
The single was a massive commercial success. It held the number one position on the US Billboard Hot 100 for 14 weeks, from August 27 to November 26, 1994. At the time, the song tied a record for the most weeks at number one that had been set by Whitney Houston's "I Will Always Love You" in late 1992 and early 1993. Boyz II Men would later break their own record in 1996 with "One Sweet Day", a collaboration with Mariah Carey, which remained at number one on the Hot 100 for 16 weeks beginning in December 1995. "I'll Make Love to You" also topped the US R&B and adult contemporary charts for nine and three weeks, respectively, in 1994. It sold 1,627,000 copies domestically, earning a platinum certification from the Recording Industry Association of America for shipments of over one million copies. In Canada, the song reached number one on September 26, retaining the position for two weeks. "All I Wanna Do" by Sheryl Crow then held the top position for four weeks, but on November 2, "I'll Make Love to You" returned to number one for an additional week before beginning its final descent from the chart.

Outside North America, "I'll Make Love to You" also experienced major chart success. It reached number one in New Zealand on September 11, keeping that position for four weeks before "Endless Love" by Luther Vandross and Mariah Carey moved to number one. In Australia, the song reached the top on October 16 and stayed there for two weeks, losing its spot at number one to Silverchair's "Tomorrow". On both charts, the song stayed in the top 50 for 22 weeks. Across Europe, the song reached the top 10 in most countries, but fell outside this range in Germany and Finland, where it peaked at 20 and 12, respectively. In the UK, the song debuted at number six on the UK Singles Chart on August 28 before moving up to number five the next week, its peak position. It stayed in the top 40 for a further eight weeks. In Ireland, the song was slightly less successful, reaching number seven and spending 10 weeks on the Irish Singles Chart.

=== Awards and accolades ===
"I'll Make Love to You" won the 1995 Grammy Award for Best R&B Performance by a Duo or Group with Vocals at the 37th Annual Grammy Awards and two American Music Awards for Favorite Pop/Rock Single and Favorite Soul/R&B Single at the American Music Awards of 1995. It ranks at number 19 on Billboard's All-Time Top 100 Songs.

== Music video ==
The music video for "I'll Make Love to You" was directed by American music video director, film director and VJ Lionel C. Martin for Motown Records. It depicts a story around a woman and a man. The man, played by actor Duane Martin, installs a security system in the woman's house. She later invites him to have a drink, but he's busy. It turns out that she really likes him; likewise, as he likes her too. While reading her letter, he begins to slowly take off his clothes, right at the moment in the song where the lyrics say he should. In the end, he writes her a letter, she receives it and reads it: it is a love letter, with the song lyrics. The video was nominated for Best Clip of the Year in the category for R&B/Urban at the 1994 Billboard Music Video Awards. It was later made available on Boyz II Men's official YouTube channel in 2009, having generated more than 219 million views as of May 2025.

== Track listings ==
- European single
1. "I'll Make Love to You (Pop Edit)" - 3:49
2. "I'll Make Love to You (Instrumental)" - 5:39
- UK CD single and US maxi-CD
1. I'll Make Love to You (Pop Edit) - 3:49
2. I'll Make Love to You (LP Version) - 4:07
3. I'll Make Love to You (Instrumental) - 5:39
4. I'll Make Love to You (Acapella) - 4:49

== Charts ==
=== Weekly charts ===
Weekly chart performance for "I'll Make Love to You"
Chart (1994–1995)	Peak position
Australia (ARIA)	1
Belgium (Ultratop 50 Flanders)	7
Canada Retail Singles (The Record)	1
Canada Contemporary Hit Radio (The Record)	1
Canada Top Singles (RPM)	1
Denmark (IFPI)	5
Europe (Eurochart Hot 100)	10
Europe (European AC Radio)	1
Europe (European Hit Radio)	2
Finland (Suomen virallinen lista)	12
France (SNEP)	2
France Airplay (SNEP)	5
Germany (GfK)	20
Iceland (Íslenski Listinn Topp 40)	9
Ireland (IRMA)	7
Israel (Israeli Singles Chart))	24
Netherlands (Dutch Top 40)	4
Netherlands (Single Top 100)	6
New Zealand (Recorded Music NZ)	1
Norway (VG-lista)	5
Panama (UPI)	9
Scottish Singles Sales (Official Charts)	12
Spain Airplay (Top 40 Radio)	16
Sweden (Sverigetopplistan)	6
Switzerland (Schweizer Hitparade)	9
UK Singles (Official Charts)	5
UK Airplay (Music Week)	2
US Billboard Hot 100	1
US Adult Contemporary (Billboard)	1
US Hot R&B/Hip-Hop Songs (Billboard)	1
US Pop Airplay (Billboard)	1
US Rhythmic Airplay (Billboard)	1
US Cash Box Top 100	1
Zimbabwe (ZIMA)	1

=== Year-end charts ===
1994 year-end chart performance for "I'll Make Love to You"
Chart (1994)	Position
Australia (ARIA)	7
Belgium (Ultratop)	42
Brazil (Brazilian Radio Airplay)	2
Canada Top Singles (RPM)	9
Europe (Eurochart Hot 100)	46
Europe (European AC Radio)	13
Europe (European Hit Radio)	26
France (SNEP)	35
France Airplay (SNEP)	36
Netherlands (Dutch Top 40)	50
Netherlands (Single Top 100)	51
New Zealand (RIANZ)	3
Sweden (Topplistan)	34
Switzerland (Schweizer Hitparade)	46
UK Singles (OCC)	43
UK Airplay (Music Week)	31
US Billboard Hot 100	3
US Adult Contemporary (Billboard)	48
US Hot R&B Singles (Billboard)	3
US Cash Box Top 100	6

1995 year-end chart performance for "I'll Make Love to You"
Chart (1995)	Position
France (SNEP)	82
US Billboard Hot 100	50
US Adult Contemporary (Billboard)	30

=== Decade-end charts ===
Decade-end chart performance for "I'll Make Love to You"
Chart (1990–1999)	Position
Canada (Nielsen SoundScan)	29
US Billboard Hot 100	3

=== All-time charts ===
All-time chart performance for "I'll Make Love to You"
Chart	Position
US Billboard Hot 100	22

== Certifications ==
Certifications for "I'll Make Love to You"
Region	Certification	Certified units/sales
Australia (ARIA)	Platinum	70,000^{^}
New Zealand (RMNZ)	Platinum	30,000^{‡}
United Kingdom (BPI)	Platinum	600,000^{‡}
United States (RIAA)	4× Platinum	4,000,000^{‡}
^{^} Shipments figures based on certification alone.^{‡} Sales+streaming figures based on certification alone.

== Release history ==
Release dates and formats for "I'll Make Love to You"
Region	Date	Format(s)	Label(s)	Ref.
United States	July 26, 1994	—N/a	Motown	
United Kingdom	August 23, 1994	7-inch vinyl; CD; cassette	Motown	
Japan	September 10, 1994	Mini-CD	Motown	
Australia	September 12, 1994	CD; cassette	Motown; Polydor	

== In popular culture ==
On the 2020 Hulu series High Fidelity episode "Track 2", actor Thomas Doherty sings a cover of the song in-character as Liam Shawcross, a musician who protagonist Rob Brooks (Zoë Kravitz) later has a one-night-stand with.

On the 2015 episode of the Netflix comedy Unbreakable Kimmy Schmidt "Kimmy Goes on a Date!", Titus Andromedon (Tituss Burgess) sings the song at a funeral at the request for a Boyz II Men song by his landlady Lillian Kaushtupper (Carol Kane), both realizing his mistake as he gets to the chorus that he chose the wrong song.

In series 2, episode 5, "Bump in the Night", of the BBC comedy series Ghosts in 2020, Julian Fawcett MP (Simon Farnaby), the trouser-less ghost of a Conservative MP who died in 1993, sings the song a cappella for the ghosts' music club, much to the dismay of the less contemporary ghosts.

In the 2012 film Pitch Perfect, an a cappella version of two lines of the song is included in a medley performed by the Barden Bellas as part of the Riff-Off.

In season 1, episode 6, "The Birthday Girl" of That 90's Show in 2023, Bob Pinciotti (Don Stark) sings the song to his granddaughter Leia Forman (Callie Haverda).

Boyz II Men created a parody of the song called "I'll Make Love to You (But We Don't Have To)" on The Late Show with Stephen Colbert in 2023.

== See also ==
- Hot 100 number-one hits of 1994 (USA)
- R&B number-one hits of 1994 (USA)
- List of Hot Adult Contemporary number ones of 1994 and 1995 (U.S.)
