= Can We Talk =

1993 single by Tevin Campbell

Single by Tevin Campbell

from the album I'm Ready
- Released: September 21, 1993
- Genre: R&B
- Length: 4:45
- Label: Qwest
- Songwriters: Babyface; Daryl Simmons
- Producers: Babyface; Simmons

Tevin Campbell singles chronology
"One Song" (1993)	"Can We Talk" (1993)	"I'm Ready" (1994)

Music video
- "Can We Talk" on YouTube

"Can We Talk" is a song performed by American R&B singer-songwriter Tevin Campbell. It was written and produced by Babyface and Daryl Simmons, and released in September 1993, by Qwest Records, as the lead single from Campbell's second studio album, I'm Ready (1993). The song hit the top ten on the American pop charts, peaking at numbers nine and seven on the US Billboard Hot 100 and the Cash Box Top 100. It also spent a total of three weeks at number one on the Billboard R&B chart. It sold 500,000 copies and earned a gold certification from the Recording Industry Association of America (RIAA). The song was also nominated for a Grammy Award for Best Male R&B Vocal Performance and won the Soul Train Music Award for Best R&B/Soul Single – Male. In 2026, the song was voted the second greatest R&B song of all time by Essence magazine, bested only by Stevie Wonder's 1977 hit "As".

== Music video ==
The accompanying music video for "Can We Talk" was filmed by German film director Marcus Nispel. Shot in New York City's Central Park, it features Campbell and friends traversing the park while he tries to catch the eye of his love interest.

== Track listings ==
US single
No.	Title	Writer(s)	Producer(s)	Length
1.	"Can We Talk" (Edit)	Babyface; Daryl Simmons	Babyface; Simmons	4:21
2.	"Look What We'd Have (If You Were Mine)"	Narada Michael Walden; Tevin Campbell; Tony Lindsay	Walden	4:40

US promo CD
No.	Title	Writer(s)	Producer(s)	Length
1.	"Can We Talk" (Remix Radio Version)	Babyface; Simmons	Babyface; Simmons; Def Def^{[a]}; Meech Wells^{[a]}	3:53
2.	"Can We Talk" (Full Remix)	Babyface; Simmons	Babyface; Simmons; Def Def^{[a]}; Wells^{[a]}	4:55
3.	"Can We Talk" (Let's Talkstramental Mix)	Babyface; Simmons	Babyface; Simmons; Def Def^{[a]}; Wells^{[a]}	4:26
4.	"Can We Talk" (Backward Beats Mix)	Babyface; Simmons	Babyface; Simmons; Def Def^{[a]}; Wells^{[a]}	4:21
5.	"Can We Talk" (Album Radio Edit)	Babyface; Simmons	Babyface; Simmons; Def Def^{[a]}; Wells^{[a]}	4:21

European CD maxi-single
No.	Title	Writer(s)	Producer(s)	Length
1.	"Can We Talk" (Edit)	Babyface; Simmons	Babyface; Simmons	4:21
2.	"Strawberry Letter" (Club Mix)	Shuggie Otis	Quincy Jones; Quincy D III^{[a]}	6:28
3.	"Strawberry Letter" (LP Version)	Otis	Jones; Quincy D III^{[a]}	4:07
4.	"Strawberry Letter" (QD III Mix With Rap)	Otis	Jones; Quincy D III^{[a]}	4:12

Notes

- ^{^[a]} denotes co-producer

== Credits and personnel ==
Credits adapted from liner notes.

- Tevin Campbell – lead and background vocals,
- Babyface – writer, composer, producer, all music and background vocals
- Daryl Simmons – writer, composer and producer
- Randy Walker – MIDI technician
- Jim Zumpano, Donnell Sullivan – recording engineers
- Rail Rogut, Steve Warner, Ulrich Wild – assistant engineers
- Dave Way – mixing engineer
- Ivy Skoff – production coordinator

== Charts ==
=== Weekly charts ===
Weekly chart performance for "Can We Talk"
Chart (1993–1994)	Peak position
Australia (ARIA)	12
Canada Retail Singles (The Record)	19
Canada Top Singles (RPM)	50
New Zealand (Recorded Music NZ)	26
US Billboard Hot 100	9
US Hot R&B/Hip-Hop Songs (Billboard)	1
US Pop Airplay (Billboard)	14
US Rhythmic Airplay (Billboard)	3
US Cash Box Top 100	7

=== Year-end charts ===
1993 year-end chart performance for "Can We Talk"
Chart (1993)	Position
US Hot R&B Singles (Billboard)	75

1994 year-end chart performance for "Can We Talk"
Chart (1994)	Position
Australia (ARIA)	50
US Billboard Hot 100	36
US Hot R&B Singles (Billboard)	4
US Cash Box Top 100	39

== Certifications ==
Certifications for "Can We Talk"
Region	Certification	Certified units/sales
Australia (ARIA)	Gold	35,000^{^}
New Zealand (RMNZ)	3× Platinum	90,000^{‡}
United Kingdom (BPI)	Silver	200,000^{‡}
United States (RIAA)	Gold	500,000^{^}
^{^} Shipments figures based on certification alone.^{‡} Sales+streaming figures based on certification alone.

== Code Red version ==
"Can We Talk"

Single by Code Red

from the album Scarlet
- Released: 1997
- Length: 4:04
- Label: Polydor
- Songwriters: Babyface; Daryl Simmons

Code Red singles chronology
"This Is Our Song" (1996)	"Can We Talk" (1997)	"Is There Someone Out There" (1997)

The song was covered by many other artists, most successfully by British boy band Code Red in 1996 for their debut album Scarlet. It was released as the album's third single in 1997, reaching number 29 on the UK Singles Chart.

== See also ==
- List of number-one R&B singles of 1993 (U.S.)
- List of number-one R&B singles of 1994 (U.S.)
