= La Toya Jackson discography =

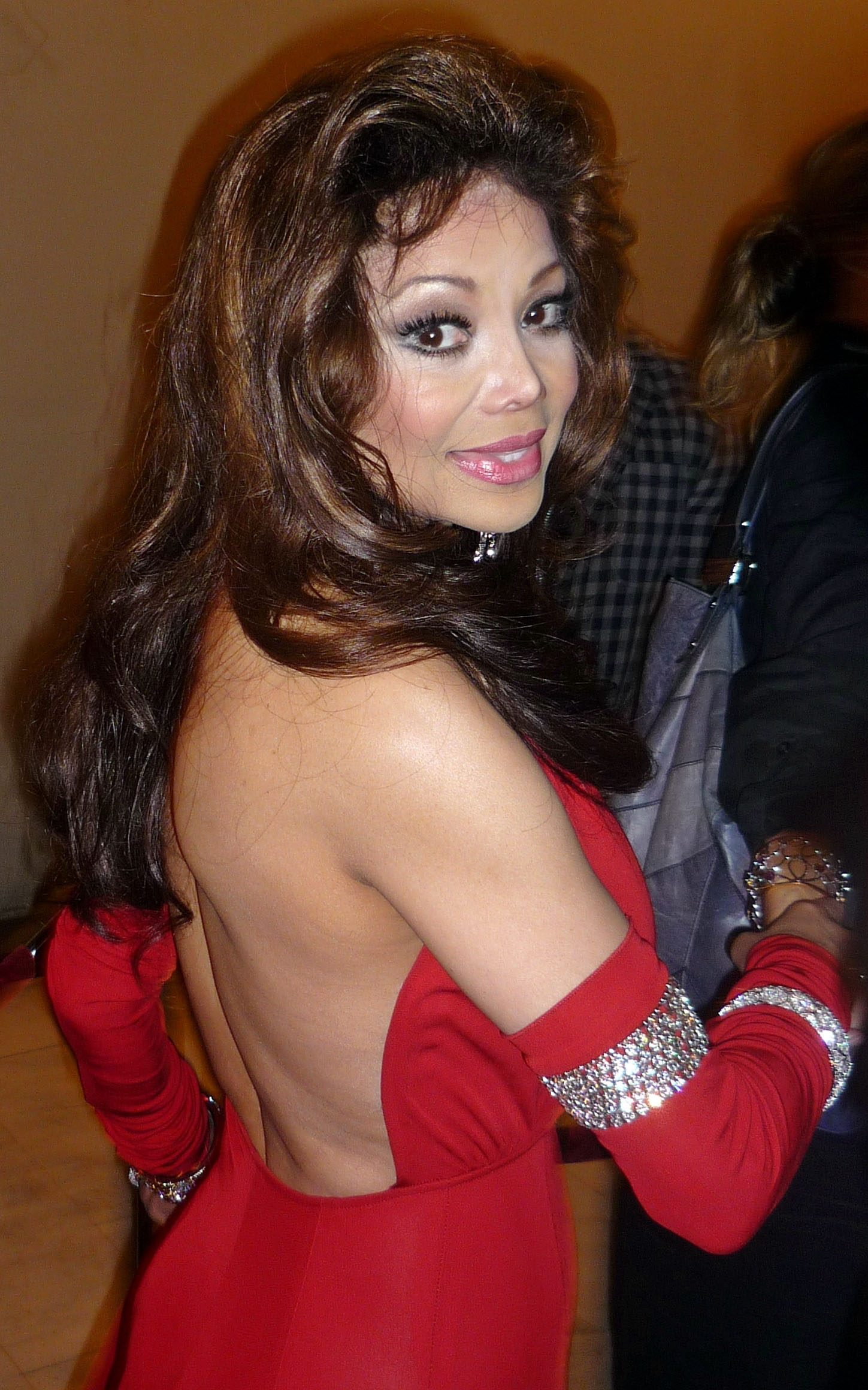
- Jackson in 2011
- Studio albums: 9
- Extended plays: 1
- Singles: 32
- Music videos: 5
- Concert videos: 2

This article contains information about La Toya Jackson's album and singles. She has released eleven studio albums, beginning with her self-titled album in 1980. She has had one single on the US Billboard Hot 100 and three albums chart on the US Billboard 200.

== Albums ==
=== Studio albums ===
| Title | Album details | Peak chart positions | |
| Title | Album details | US | US R&B |
|---|---|---|---|
| La Toya Jackson | Released: 1980; Label: Polydor; Formats: LP, CD, cassette, 8 track | 116 | 26 |
| My Special Love | Released: 1981; Label: Polydor; Formats: LP, CD, cassette, 8 track | 175 | — |
| Heart Don't Lie | Released: 1984; Label: Private-I/Epic; Formats: LP, CD, cassette | 149 | 65 |
| Imagination | Released: 1986; Label: Private-I/Epic; Formats: LP, CD, cassette | — | — |
| La Toya | Released: 1988; Label: Teldec/RCA; Formats: LP, CD, cassette | — | — |
| Bad Girl | Released: 1990; Label: Sherman; Formats: LP, CD, cassette | — | — |
| No Relations | Released: 1991; Label: Pump; Formats: LP, CD, cassette | — | — |
| From Nashville to You | Released: 1994; Label: Mar-Gor; Formats: CD, cassette | — | — |
| Stop in the Name of Love | Released: 1995; Label: CMC; Formats: CD | — | — |
"—" denotes items which were not released in that country or failed to chart.

=== Soundtrack albums ===
| Title | Album details |
|---|---|
| Formidable | Released: 1992; Label: PierJenn; Formats: CD |

== Extended plays ==
| Title | EP details |
|---|---|
| Starting Over | Released: June 21, 2011; Label: Bungalo; Formats: Digital download |

== Singles ==
| Title | Year | Peak chart positions | | | | | | | | Album |
| Title | Year | US | US Dance | US R&B | BEL (FL) | ITA | NL | NZ | UK | Album |
|---|---|---|---|---|---|---|---|---|---|---|
| "Night Time Lover" | 1980 | — | — | 59 | — | — | — | — | — | La Toya Jackson |
| "If You Feel the Funk" | 1980 | 103 | 17 | 40 | 9 | — | 13 | — | — | La Toya Jackson |
| "Stay the Night" | 1981 | — | — | 31 | — | — | — | — | — | My Special Love |
| "I Don't Want You to Go" | 1981 | — | — | — | — | — | — | — | — | My Special Love |
| "Bet'cha Gonna Need My Lovin'" | 1983 | — | 55 | 22 | — | — | — | — | — | Heart Don't Lie |
| "Heart Don't Lie" | 1984 | 56 | — | 29 | — | — | — | — | — | Heart Don't Lie |
| "Hot Potato" | 1984 | — | 38 | 43 | — | — | — | — | 92 | Heart Don't Lie |
| "Private Joy" | 1984 | — | — | — | — | — | — | — | — | Heart Don't Lie |
| "Baby Sister" | 1985 | — | — | — | — | — | — | — | — | Imagination |
| "He's a Pretender" | 1986 | — | — | 76 | — | — | — | — | — | Imagination |
| "Imagination" | 1986 | — | — | — | — | — | — | — | — | Imagination |
| "Oops, Oh No!" (with Cerrone) | 1986 | — | — | 89 | — | — | 41 | — | — | —N/a |
| "(Ain't Nobody Loves You) Like I Do" | 1987 | — | — | — | — | — | — | — | — | La Toya |
| "(Tell Me) She Means Nothing to You at All" | 1988 | — | — | — | — | — | — | — | — | La Toya |
| "You're Gonna Get Rocked!" | 1988 | — | — | 66 | 35 | — | 82 | 42 | 90 | La Toya |
| "Such a Wicked Love" | 1988 | — | — | — | — | — | — | — | — | La Toya |
| "You Blew" | 1988 | — | — | — | — | — | — | — | — | La Toya |
| "Bad Girl" | 1989 | — | — | — | — | — | — | — | — | Bad Girl |
| "Sexual Feeling" | 1990 | — | — | — | — | — | — | — | — | Bad Girl |
| "You and Me" | 1990 | — | — | — | — | 28 | — | — | — | Bad Girl |
| "Why Don't You Want My Love?" | 1991 | — | — | — | — | — | — | — | — | —N/a |
| "Sexbox" | 1991 | — | — | — | — | — | 23 | — | — | No Relations |
| "Let's Rock the House" | 1992 | — | — | — | — | — | — | — | — | No Relations |
| "I Can't Help Myself" | 1995 | — | — | — | — | — | — | — | — | Stop in the Name of Love |
| "Don't Break My Heart" (with Tom Beser) | 1998 | — | — | — | — | — | — | — | — | —N/a |
| "Just Wanna Dance" | 2004 | — | 13 | — | — | — | — | — | — | Starting Over |
| "Free the World" | 2005 | — | 24 | — | — | — | — | — | — | Starting Over |
| "Home" | 2009 | — | — | — | — | — | — | — | — | —N/a |
| "Feels Like Love" | 2014 | — | — | — | — | — | — | — | — | —N/a |
| "Trouble" | 2015 | — | — | — | — | — | — | — | — | —N/a |
"—" denotes items which were not released in that country or failed to chart.

=== Promotional singles ===
| Title | Year |
|---|---|
| "Yes, I'm Ready" (with Jed) | 1987 |
| "Oops, Oh No!" (Remix) | 1991 |
| "Wild Side" | 1992 |
| "I Don't Play That" | 2007 |

== As a featured artist ==
| Title | Year | Album |
|---|---|---|
| "We Are the World" (USA for Africa) | 1985 | We Are the World |
| "Feel Like Dancin'" (RuPaul featuring La Toya Jackson) | 2014 | Born Naked |
| "Tehran" (Andy featuring La Toya Jackson) | 2016 | |
| "Let Me Know" (B Howard featuring La Toya Jackson and Maffio) | 2018 | |

== Videography ==
=== Music videos ===
| Year | Music video | Director(s) | Notes |
|---|---|---|---|
| 1984 | "Heart Don't Lie" | Ed Pacio | Jackson plays a high school student in a cartoonish setting. Heart shapes, Carnival masks, and card tricks are recurring motifs. |
| 1987 | "(Ain't Nobody Loves You) Like I Do" | Unknown | Jackson, wearing a jeweled bra and jacket bearing her name, dances with five men in a colorful milieu. Jackson receives flowers from a young boy with whom she exits with at the end. |
| 1988 | "You're Gonna Get Rocked!" | Greg Gold | Jackson wears a black leather jacket and rides a motorcycle. Jackson performs a dance routine with the street toughs in her gang. |
| 2009 | "Home" | Eric Bute | Scenes of modern-day La Toya Jackson are inter-cut with scenes of her as a child playing in a field. She is shown on a swing, blowing bubbles, climbing trees, in a treehouse, and surrounded by lanterns at night. |
| 2014 | "Feels Like Love" | Erik White | Jackson performs a dance routine with four female dancers in a nightclub. Jackson wears black outfits with gold jewelry and shares a toast with a male love interest. |

=== Concert videos ===
| Year | Video details | Notes |
|---|---|---|
| 1989 | La Toya Jackson: A Sizzling Spectacular!: Format: VHS, Laserdisc, DVD | Also released as Most Famous Hits: Live at Balleys. A recording of her concert at Bally's Reno on September 5, 1989. |
| 1993 | La Toya Jackson: Live in Poland: Format: DVD | Recorded at Sopot International Song Festival in Sopot, Poland in 1993. |

== Footnotes ==
- 1. "Baby Sister" is notable as the winner of an Outstanding Song Award at the 1985 World Popular Song Festival.
