= From Nashville to You =

Studio album by La Toya Jackson
- Released: 1994
- Recorded: 1994
- Studio: Creative Recording (Berry Hill, Tennessee)
- Genres: Country; rockabilly
- Length: 44:23
- Label: Mar-Gor
- Producers: Jack Gordon; La Toya Jackson; Tommy Martin

La Toya Jackson chronology
Formidable (1992)	From Nashville to You (1994)	Stop in the Name of Love (1995)

Alternative covers
- 1996 My Country Collection re-release

Alternative cover
- 2003 Little Misunderstood re-release

From Nashville to You is the ninth studio album by American singer La Toya Jackson. The album, which has also been released as My Country Collection and Little Misunderstood, features country western music.

== Background and production ==
In Spring 1994 it was reported in various newspapers that Jackson was preparing an album of country music. Tommy Martin was recruited as producer of the album by Jackson's ex-husband and manager Jack Gordon. Gordon described Jackson as "the new country-western heart throb." Gordon also described the album as "very up, very country, very Garth Brooks-like."

Recording sessions for the album took place from March 20–27, 1994 at the Creative Recording studio in Nashville. The album was recorded with a live band and a team of three backing vocalists. When asked by TimesDaily why she chose to record a country album, Jackson replied:

Why not? Country is something I have always liked, something I have always wanted to do. Actually, a lot of people don't know this, but the Jacksons started with country music. My mother started singing country music to us when we were very, very young in Indiana. And it's something that kinda sticks with you, or with me, at least it did. I've always wanted to do it and I never had the opportunity to do it or the chance to.

Martin called on his friend, countrypolitan singer Lee Greenwood, to collaborate with Jackson. The result was the duet "What You Don't Say." Greenwood stated that Jackson "is presented with a great challenge here to be accepted into the country music community. I don't think she is going to have any trouble. First of all, on these songs she is very unique(sic). There is not a voice like hers."

== Release and reissues ==
The album was initially released in 1994, by Mar-Gor Records, a label founded by Tommy Martin and Jack Gordon. The record label eventually shut down, and the licensing of From Nashville to You was sold to Sherman Records. The album with the original cover is still available from Martin's website.

Sherman Records subsequently re-released the album under the titles My Country Collection in 1996 and Little Misunderstood in 2003. The latter release includes a bonus medley of "Boots," "Burnin' Love," "Little Misunderstood," and "One Strike You're Out." A 1996 compilation titled Great Ladies of Country & Western bundles the album with Lynn Anderson's Rose Garden.

== Reception ==
Professional ratings
Review scores
Source	Rating
Allmusic	1/5 stars
TimesDaily	(favorable)

TimesDaily reviewed the album in July 1994 and opined that "people will be pleasantly surprised when they get a chance to hear the album." "I've Got To Be Bad", "Trash Like You", and "Dance Away These Blues Tonight" were highlighted as "rockers" that best suited Jackson. The paper concluded, "Given a chance, this album could be a real big winner for Jackson and Martin."

In contrast, Allmusic described the album as "unriveting, bland" and "weak". It went on to say that Jackson's version of "Crazy" could not match Patsy Cline's rendition.

== Legacy ==
La Toya Jackson has since stated that she regrets the album's release. In her 2011 memoir Starting Over she called the project "bizarre and doomed from its inception." In the years since the album’s release, the cover was changed to a more recent photo of Jackson in a cowboy hat.

In a 2007 interview, Tommy Martin praised Jackson's three-octave voice and revealed that he had “remixed a couple of those songs and in some places where she was weak, I pulled it up stronger. The duet is now so full and so good.”

== Track listing ==
1. "Fanfare - Intro" – 0:45
2. "Burnin' Love" (Dennis Linde) – 3:15
3. "So In Love with You" (Lionel Richie) – 4:18
4. "Georgia Dreamin'" (Keith Vincent) – 3:48
5. "I've Got to Be Bad" (Rodney Lay, Jr.) – 3:32
6. "Crazy" (Willie Nelson) – 2:54
7. "Trash Like You" (Vernon Rust) – 3:03
8. "Another Heart" (David Lee Murphy, Dobie Gray) – 2:59
9. "Dance Away These Blues Tonight" (Rodney Lay, Jr., Steve Bishir) – 3:10
10. "Boots" (Bert Reisfeld, Lee Hazlewood) – 3:37
11. "What You Don't Say" (Duet with Lee Greenwood) – 3:20
12. "Little Misunderstood" (Angelo Petraglia, Doug Millett, Morgan Rhoads) – 2:49
13. "One Strike You're Out" (Ray Burghardt, Ren Ashley) – 3:04
14. "Break a Leg" (David Briggs, Donna Fargo) – 3:49
- Re-released in 1996 as My Country Collection.

=== Little Misunderstood ===
Released under Sherman Records. Includes a bonus medley.

1. "Fanfare Intro" / "Burnin' Love" – 4:00
2. "So in Love with You" – 4:18
3. "Georgia Dreamin'" – 3:48
4. "I've Got to Be Bad to Have a Good Time" – 3:32
5. "Crazy" – 2:54
6. "Trash Like You" – 3:03
7. "Another Heart" – 2:59
8. "Dance Away These Blues Tonight" – 3:10
9. "Boots (These Boots Are Made for Walking)" – 3:37
10. "What You Don't Say" (Duet with Lee Greenwood) – 3:20
11. "Little Misunderstood" – 2:49
12. "One Strike You're Out" – 3:04
13. "Break a Leg" – 3:49
14. "Medley" – 3:55

== Personnel ==
- La Toya Jackson - vocals
- Chris Lenzinger, John Willis - electric guitar
- Biff Watson, Bill Hullett - acoustic guitar
- Don Kerce - bass
- David Briggs - keyboards, arrangements
- Steve Turner - drums
- Bergen White, Cindy Richardson Walker, Jana King, Vicki Hampton - backing vocals
- Bergen White - vocal arrangements
