= Starting Over (autobiography) =

2011 autobiography by La Toya Jackson

- First edition
- Author: La Toya Jackson with Jeffré Phillips
- Language: English
- Subject: Autobiography
- Publisher: Gallery Books
- Publication date: June 21, 2011 (hardback); May 29, 2012 (paperback)
- Publication place: United States
- Pages: 352
- ISBN: 1451620586
- OCLC: 687663985
- Dewey Decimal: 782.42166092, B
- LC Class: ML420.J16 A3 2011

Starting Over is a 2011 autobiography by American musician and recording artist La Toya Jackson. The book was published by Gallery Books and was released on June 21, 2011. It made The New York Times Best Seller list for the week ending July 2, 2011.

== Background ==
The title of the book is a reference to how Jackson "started over" after divorcing her abusive manager Jack Gordon. She stated, "I think it is important for everybody to start over in their life when it is not going properly or the way they think it should go or should be going, or if there's problems in their life." The title is shared with her comeback record, Starting Over, which was released on the same day as the book. According to Jackson, the album's autobiographical songs inspired the book. Jackson told Us Weekly that she decided to write the book when women contacted her after seeing Jackson's 2005 interview on 20/20. "This book was written for people who have endured abuse. Women cannot allow men to rob their self-esteem and self-worth. I want them to know that they can use their voice to make a change." Jackson began working on the book in February 2008 and completed it in Spring 2011. Even though Jackson was pictured with her brother Michael on the hardcover edition, she stated that "the book is not about Michael. 85 percent of that book is about me starting over and encouraging [women]." "The company wanted me to incorporate Michael and I realized he is a part of my life and he just passed so people are going to think I was selfish if I didn't include him."

== Summary and themes ==
The book picks up from where her previous autobiography, Growing Up In The Jackson Family, left off. It details her abusive relationship with, and escape from, her manager Jack Gordon.

The latter part of the book describes how her brother Michael Jackson confided in La Toya that he feared being killed for his music and publishing estate. In the book La Toya reveals that she feared for Michael's life in the months leading up to his death.

== Editions ==
The hardcover version was released on June 21, 2011. The mass market paperback was released on May 29, 2012.

== Reception ==
Jackson made The New York Times Best Seller list for the week ending July 2, 2011. This was her second book to make the list, the first being La Toya: Growing Up in the Jackson Family, which peaked at number 2.

=== Chart ===
Chart (2011)	Peak position
The New York Times Best Seller list Hardcover Nonfiction	35
