= I Don't Play That =

Promotional single by La Toya Jackson
- Released: January 29, 2007
- Recorded: 2006
- Genre: Pop; R&B; Rock
- Length: 3:37 (radio edit)
- Label: Ja-Tail Records
- Songwriters: La Toya Jackson; Jeffré Phillips; Thom Frood; David Frood; Michael Hoffman
- Producer: Jeffré Phillips

"I Don't Play That"
A sample from the "I Don't Play That", a single by La Toya Jackson.

"I Don't Play That" is a song by American singer La Toya Jackson. The single was announced in January 2007 and released to radio on January 29, 2007.

== Song information ==
The song was originally titled "Armed and Famous", after the reality television series that Jackson starred in at the time of the single's release. The single was retitled after the unexpected canceling of the show, due to its inability to compete with "American Idol". The cover of the promotional single was revealed on February 18, 2007.

In "Armed and Famous," Jackson was documented undergoing basic training and serving as a reserve officer for Muncie, Indiana's police department. The gritty track describes Jackson encountering a scene of domestic violence, reflecting Jackson's interest in victim's rights. Police Chief Joe Winkle opined that if "the song brought awareness to that issue, it would be positive." The graphic lyrics describe a wife suffering from black eyes and a cracked skull caused by her husband.

The track was co-written and produced by Jeffré Phillips, Jackson's manager and owner of the Ja-Tail record label, and features background vocals by Genevieve Jackson, daughter of La Toya's brother Randy.

== Unreleased remixes ==
Before the single's abrupt cancellation it was remixed for a club release by Matt Moss and Jared Jones of Vibelicious.

- "I Don't Play That" (Jared Jones & Matt Moss Radio Mix) (3:38)
- "I Don't Play That" (Jared Jones & Matt Moss Club Mix) (7:27)
- "I Don't Play That" (Jared Jones & Matt Moss Dub) (7:56)
- "I Don't Play That" (Vibelicious Mix 1) (3:40)
- "I Don't Play That" (Vibelicious Mix 2) (6:04)
- "I Don't Play That" (Vibelicious Euro Mix) (5:56)
