= Life with La Toya =

- Genre: Documentary
- Starring: La Toya Jackson
- Country of origin: United States
- Original language: English
- No. of seasons: 2
- No. of episodes: 23

Production
- Executive producers: Fenton Bailey; Jeffré Phillips; Jeremy Simmons; La Toya Jackson; Randy Barbato; Tom Campbell
- Running time: 20–23 minutes
- Production companies: Ja-Tail Television; World of Wonder

Original release
- Network: Oprah Winfrey Network
- Release: April 13, 2013 – August 9, 2014

Life with La Toya is an American reality documentary television series on the Oprah Winfrey Network that debuted April 13, 2013 at 10:30/9:30c. It was announced on June 10, 2013, that the Oprah Winfrey Network ordered a twelve-episode second season.

== Premise ==
Life with La Toya opens a view into the daily life of La Toya Jackson. The series chronicles Jackson as she settles into her newest home, expands her business portfolio and dives back into the dating scene in order to create her own family. It also features La Toya telling the stories of her past such as her ex-husband and the death of her brother. Contrary to reports, Michael Jackson's children only appear in one episode and are not featured within the series.

== Episodes ==
=== Series overview ===
Season	Episodes	Originally released	
Season	Episodes	First released	Last released
1	10	April 13, 2013	June 22, 2013
2	12	June 7, 2014	August 9, 2014

=== Season 1 (2013) ===
No. overall	No. in season	Title	Original release date	U.S. viewers (millions)
1	1	"La Toya on Top"	April 13, 2013	1.18
2	2	"A Message from Michael"	April 20, 2013	0.68
3	3	"Size Matters"	April 27, 2013	0.51
4	4	"La Toya's Gentlemen Caller"	May 4, 2013	0.38
5	5	"The Crying Game"	May 11, 2013	0.33
6	6	"Adventures in Babysitting"	May 18, 2013	0.36
7	7	"La Toya Finds the Beat"	June 1, 2013	0.47
8	8	"Family Vacation: Jackson Style"	June 8, 2013	0.39
9	9	"La Toya Jackson, You're Fired"	June 15, 2013	0.29
10	10	"The Secret Life of La Toya"	June 22, 2013	0.45

=== Season 2 (2014) ===
No. overall	No. in season	Title	Original release date	U.S. viewers (millions)
11	1	"There's Something About La Toya"	June 7, 2014	N/A
12	2	"What Happens in Vegas"	June 7, 2014	N/A
13	3	"Put a Ring on It"	June 14, 2014	N/A
14	4	"The Proposal"	June 21, 2014	N/A
15	5	"La Toya Takes a Bow"	June 28, 2014	N/A
16	6	"Runaway Bride"	July 5, 2014	N/A
17	7	"How to Lose a Guy in One Episode"	July 12, 2014	N/A
18	8	"If My Heart Could Speak to Your Heart..."	July 19, 2014	N/A
19	9	"Lights, Cameras, Jackson!"	July 26, 2014	N/A
20	10	"Meet the Parents Season"	August 2, 2014	N/A
21	11	"The Big Announcement"	August 9, 2014	N/A
22	12	"The Meltdown"	August 9, 2014	N/A

=== Specials ===
Title	Original release date	U.S. viewers (millions)
"A Jolly Jackson Christmas"	November 23, 2013	N/A

== Broadcast ==
In Australia, the program is available for streaming through PLUS7, the official streaming application of Seven Network.
