= The Masked Singer (American TV series) season 1 =

Season of television series

The Masked Singer
- Season 1
- Promotional poster for season one, featuring "Rabbit"
- Starring: Ken Jeong; Jenny McCarthy Wahlberg; Nicole Scherzinger; Robin Thicke
- Hosted by: Nick Cannon
- No. of contestants: 12
- Winner: T-Pain as "Monster"
- Runner-up: Donny Osmond as "Peacock"
- No. of episodes: 10

Release
- Original network: Fox
- Original release: January 2 – February 27, 2019

Season chronology
- Next → Season 2

The first season of the American television series The Masked Singer premiered on Fox on January 2, 2019, and concluded on February 27, 2019. The season was won by rapper T-Pain as "Monster", with singer Donny Osmond finishing second as "Peacock", and singer Gladys Knight placing third as "Bee".

== Production ==
As with every costume, the Lion began as a sketch by Toybina. Its mask was coated in pure gold and was heavily inspired by runway fashion.

Casting was less difficult than executive producer Izzie Pick Ibarra predicted due to her strategy of sending the possible participants sketches of costumes that might be featured during the season. She said many of the celebrities had emotional reactions when presented with the proposed costumes and were excited to reinvent their public image. Potential participants were also shown video of international versions of the show to explain the show's format visually.

The costumes worn by the celebrity contestants were designed by Marina Toybina, a four-time Emmy Award winner. Toybina described the Lion and Monster costumes as her favorites from the first season. The Lion—which took the longest to make—was inspired by The Chronicles of Narnia and Joan of Arc. It was unlike the other eleven costumes as the gemstone-laden mask was sculpted out of clay and coated in gold to give it an "armor-like aesthetic." The Monster, meanwhile, was designed around a 360° foam cylinder with built-in vents made of mesh to provide oxygen to the performer. However, during filming, the large eye the celebrity saw out of frequently fogged up due to a lack of air; tiny fans were then installed inside the costume to provide circulation. Fans were also placed inside the full-body Pineapple costume, which was constructed to resemble a Hawaiian surfer on the beach in the summer.

Other costumes, such as the Rabbit and Raven, were inspired by Hollywood movies. Toybina says the majority of costumes turn out identical to her sketches. The former was the result of combining the character Frank from the film Donnie Darko (2001) with Edward Scissorhands (1990) to create a darker, unexpected costume, while the latter was inspired by The Crow (1994). Deer was heavily influenced by steampunk elements and made to resemble "a war soldier trapped in a wood" and Peacock was made to look like an Elvis Presley "showstopper costume" inspired by the glitz of Las Vegas. The small dogs in Beverly Hills inspired Toybina to make the pink Poodle have a Real Housewives diva-like presence with accompanying sunglasses, while her love of hip-hop music inspired her to add LL Cool J-style chains to the Hippo. Unicorn, which was imagined as an ethereal white snow queen, had its horn break off during the filming of an episode. Toybina says she had to "reach for the wire and glue" to fix it backstage.

Filming occurred from June 4 to June 24, 2018. For their work on the tenth and final episode of the season, Toybina and costume supervisor Grainne O'Sullivan received a Creative Arts Emmy Award nomination for Outstanding Costumes for a Variety, Nonfiction, or Reality Programming.

== Panelists and host ==
Season 1 panelists and host

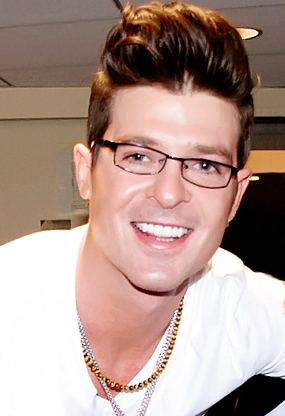
Robin Thicke

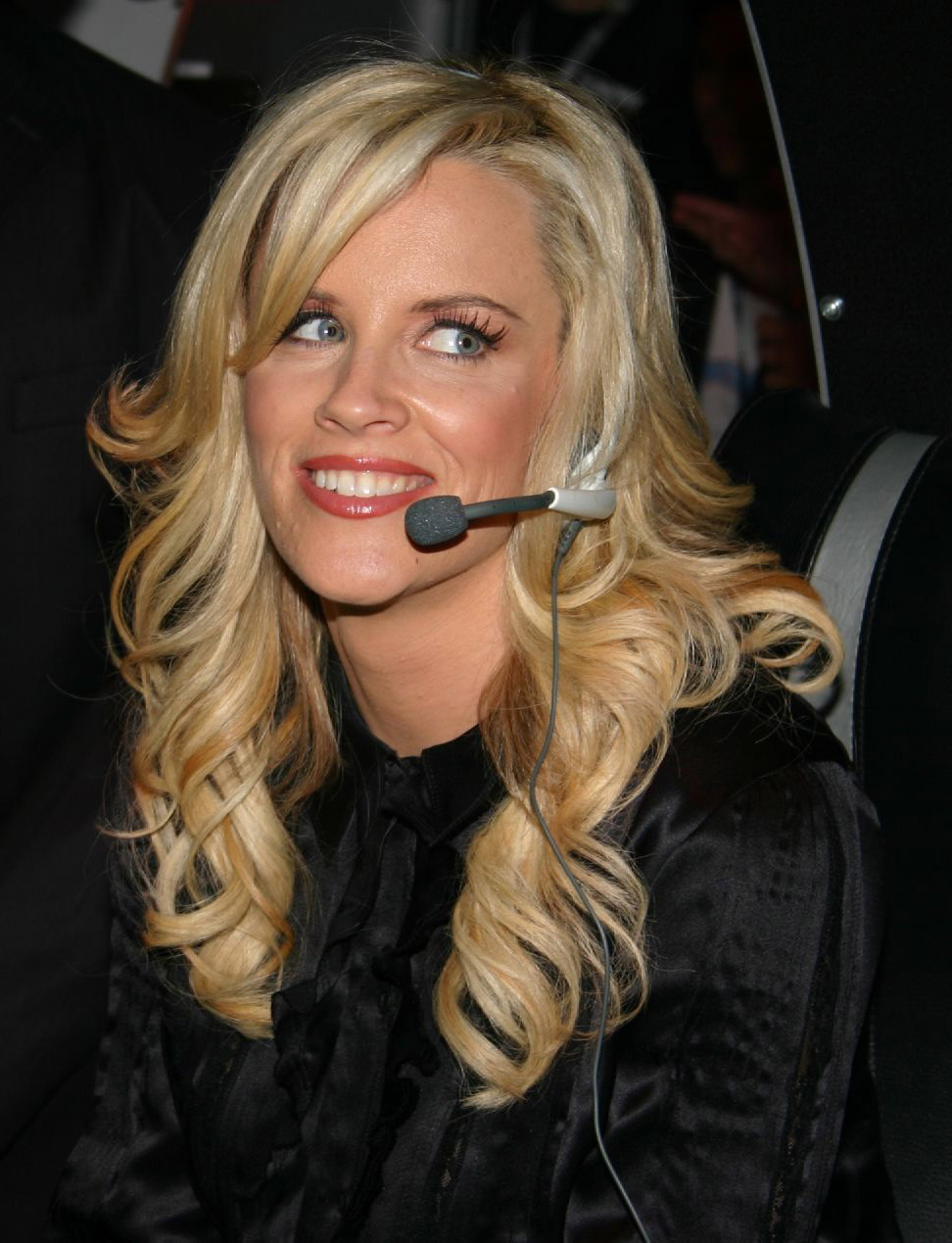
Jenny McCarthy Wahlberg

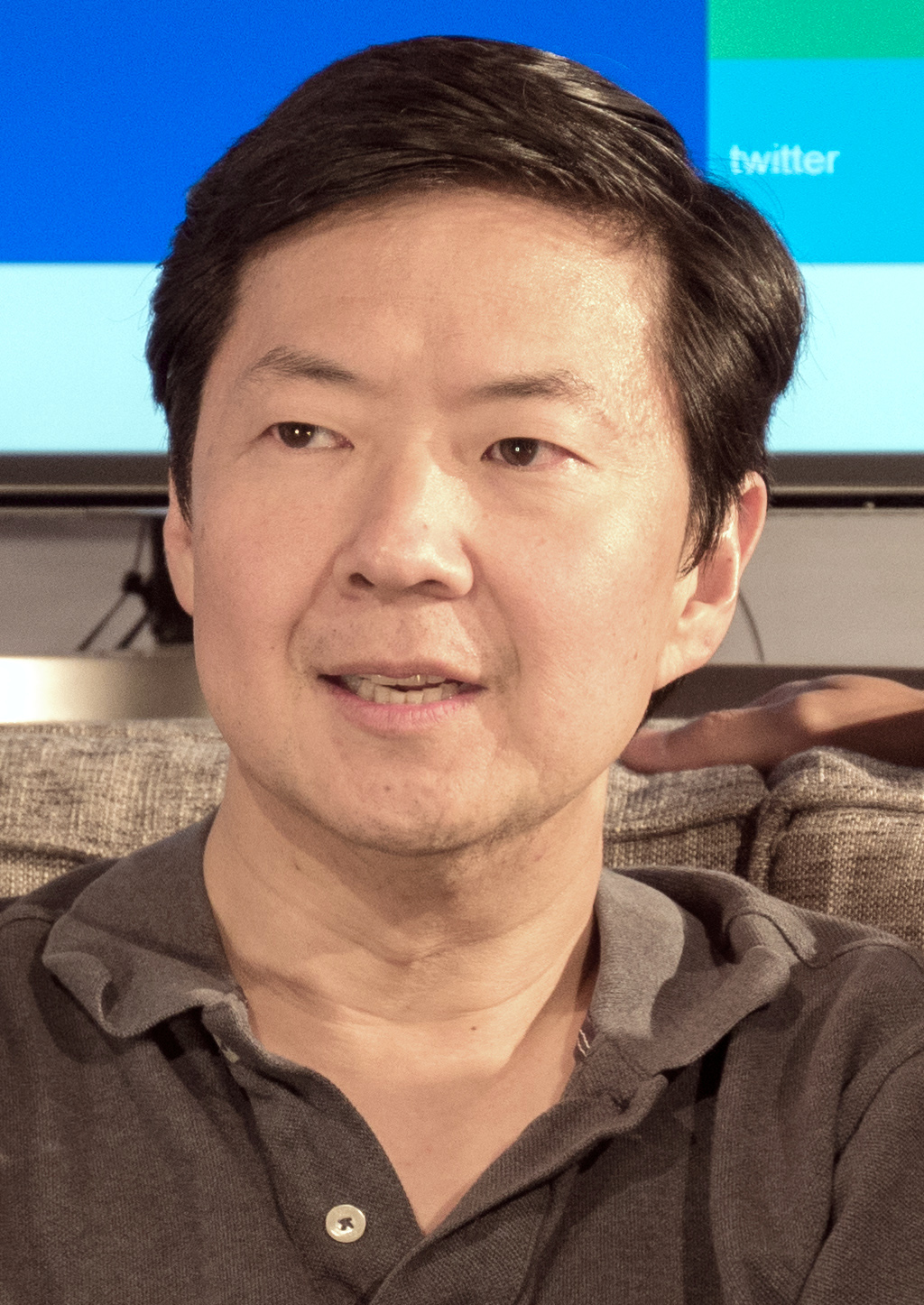
Ken Jeong

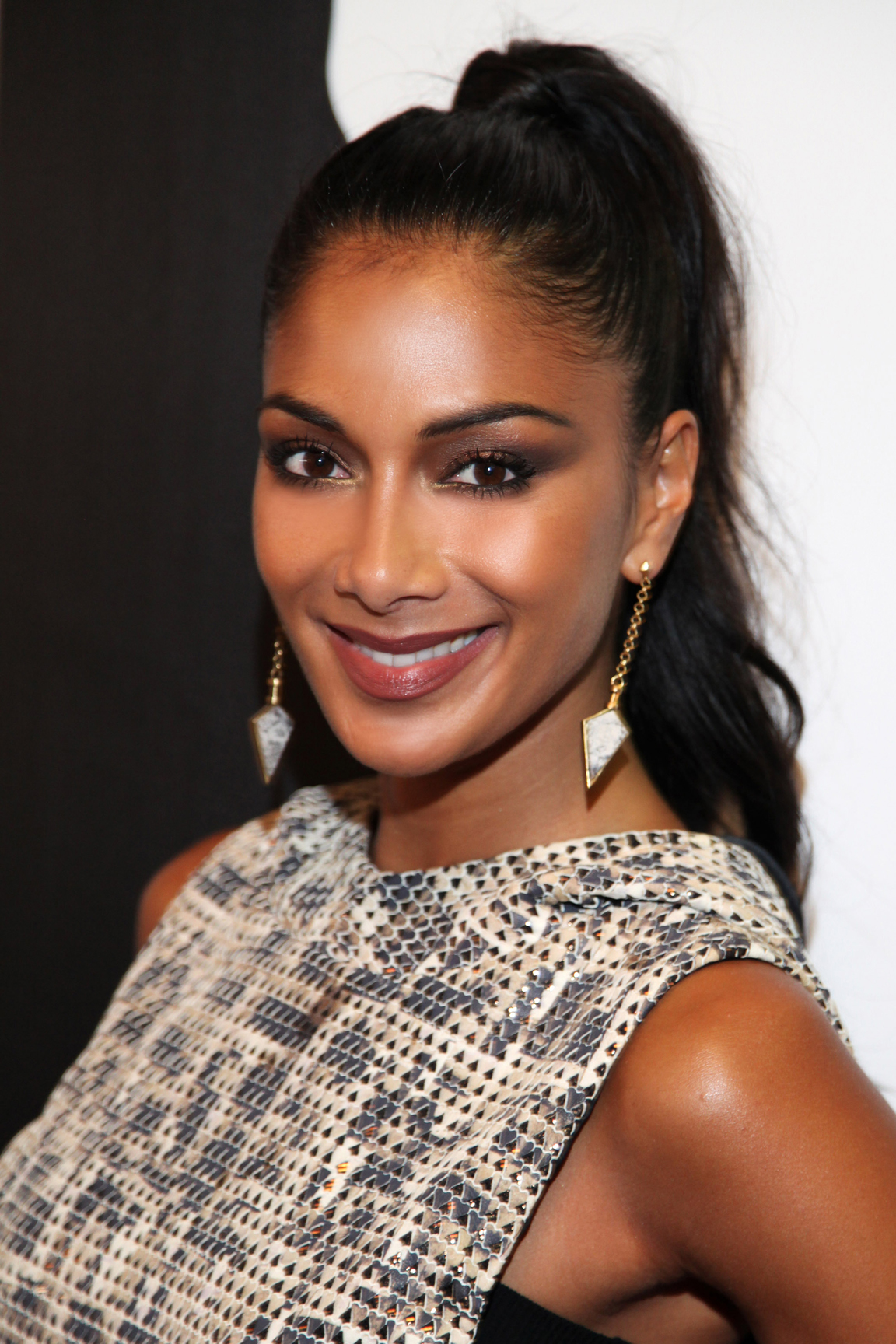
Nicole Scherzinger

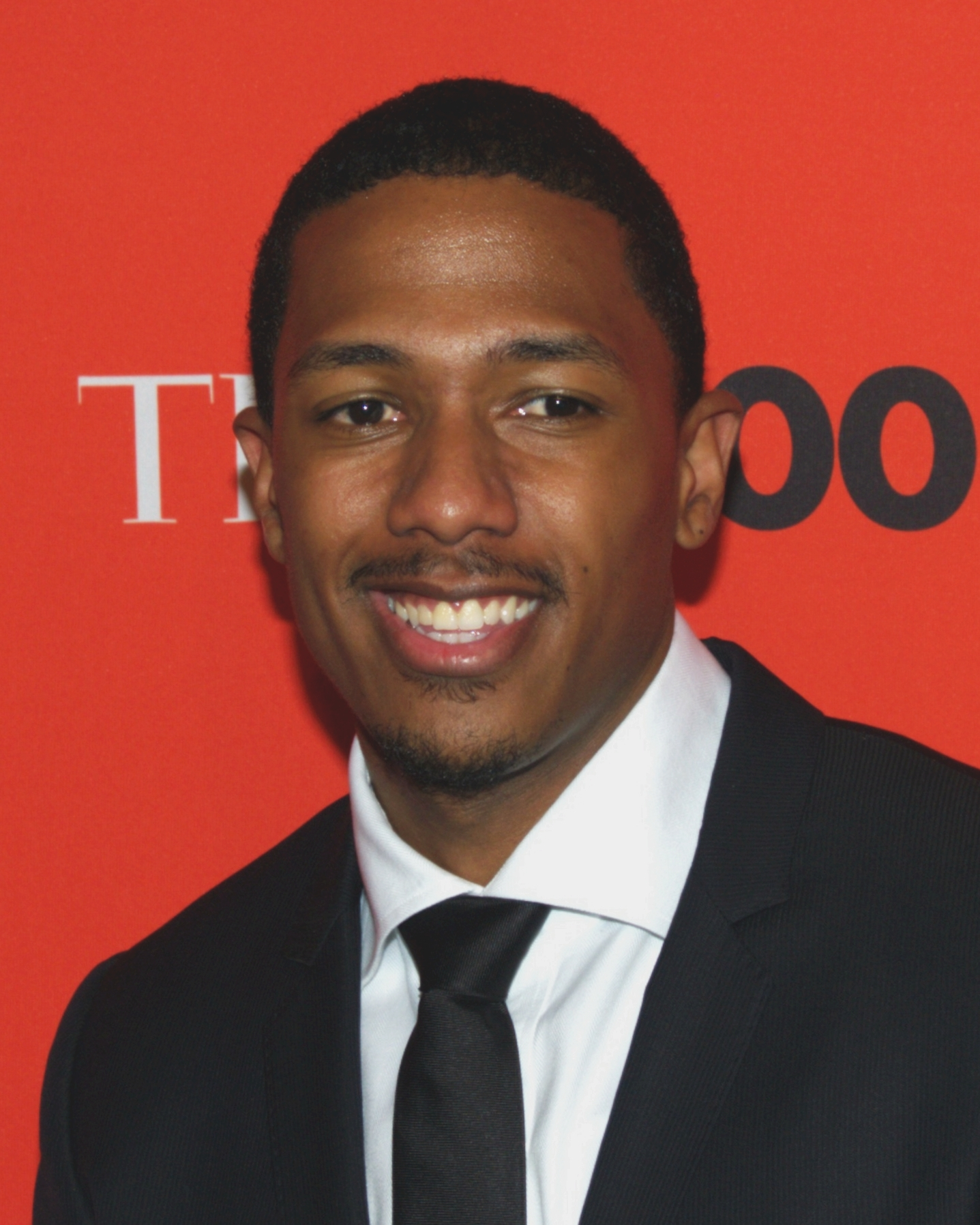
Nick Cannon

The panelists consisted of singer-songwriter Robin Thicke, television personality Jenny McCarthy Wahlberg, actor and comedian Ken Jeong, and recording artist Nicole Scherzinger. Nick Cannon hosted the show.

Throughout the season, various guest panelists appeared as the fifth panelist in the judging panel for one or two episodes. These guest panelists included actor and comedian Joel McHale in the third and fourth episodes, actor and comedian J. B. Smoove in the seventh episode, and comedian Kenan Thompson in the eighth and tenth episodes.

== Contestants ==
The competitors were said to have a combined 65 Grammy Award nominations, 16 multi-Platinum albums, 16 Emmy nominations, nine Broadway shows, four Super Bowl titles, and four stars on the Hollywood Walk of Fame.

Stage name	Celebrity	Occupation	Episodes								
Stage name	Celebrity	Occupation	1	2	3	4	5	6	7	8	10
Monster	T-Pain	Rapper	RISK		SAFE			SAFE	SAFE	SAFE	WINNER
Peacock	Donny Osmond	Singer	WIN		SAFE			SAFE	SAFE	SAFE	RUNNER-UP
Bee	Gladys Knight	Singer		WIN		SAFE		SAFE	SAFE	SAFE	THIRD
Rabbit	Joey Fatone	Singer		WIN		SAFE	SAFE		SAFE	OUT	
Lion	Rumer Willis	Actor	WIN		SAFE		SAFE		SAFE	OUT	
Alien	La Toya Jackson	Singer		RISK		SAFE	SAFE		OUT		
Raven	Ricki Lake	TV host/actor		WIN		SAFE		OUT			
Unicorn	Tori Spelling	Actor	WIN		SAFE		OUT				
Poodle	Margaret Cho	Actor/comedian		RISK		OUT					
Deer	Terry Bradshaw	Former NFL player/sportscaster	RISK		OUT						
Pineapple	Tommy Chong	Actor/comedian		OUT							
Hippo	Antonio Brown	NFL player	OUT								

The masked singer won their face-off and remained in the competition.
The masked singer lost their face-off and was in the bottom three, but was not eliminated.
The masked singer was safe from elimination.
The masked singer was eliminated from the competition and unmasked.
The masked singer did not perform.
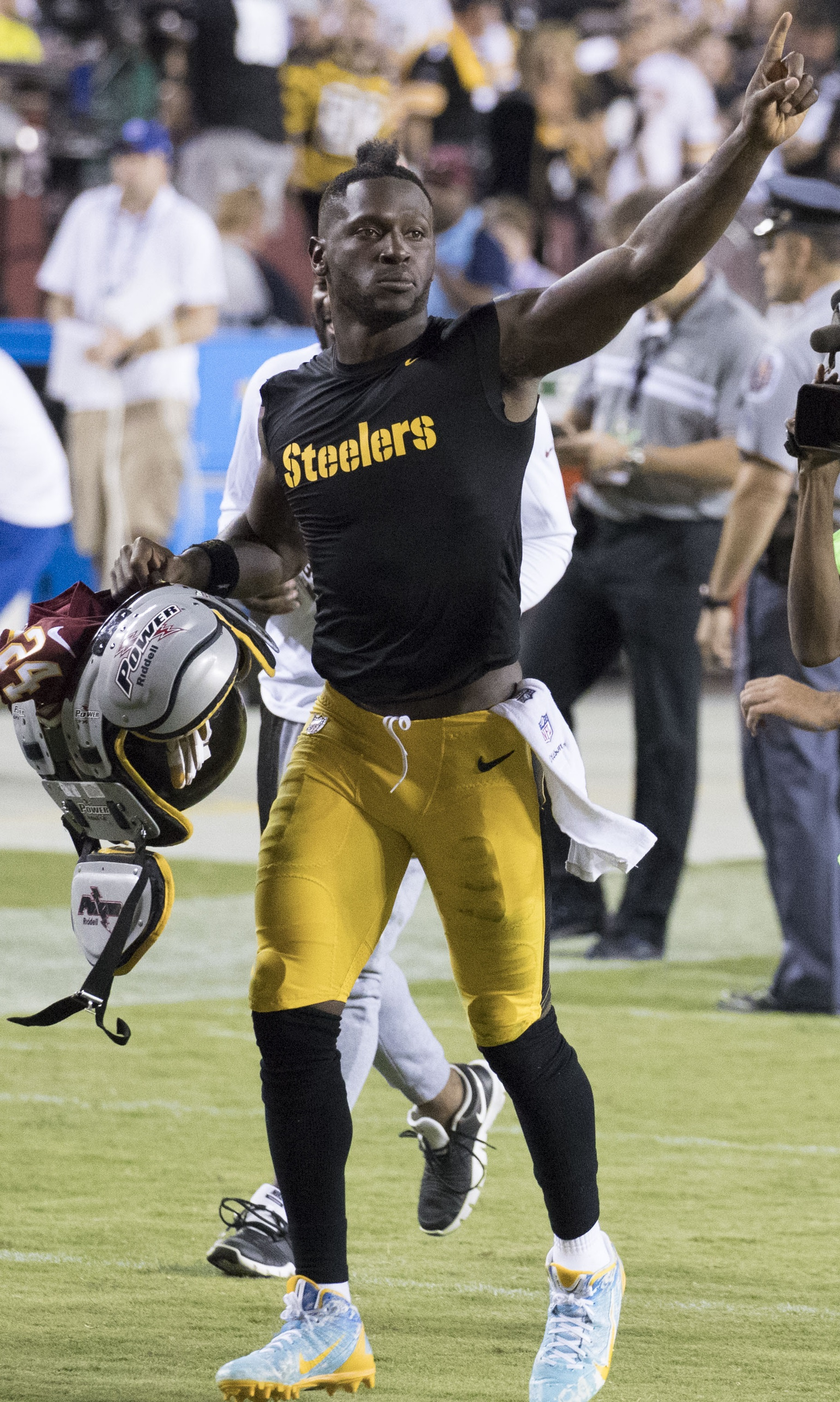
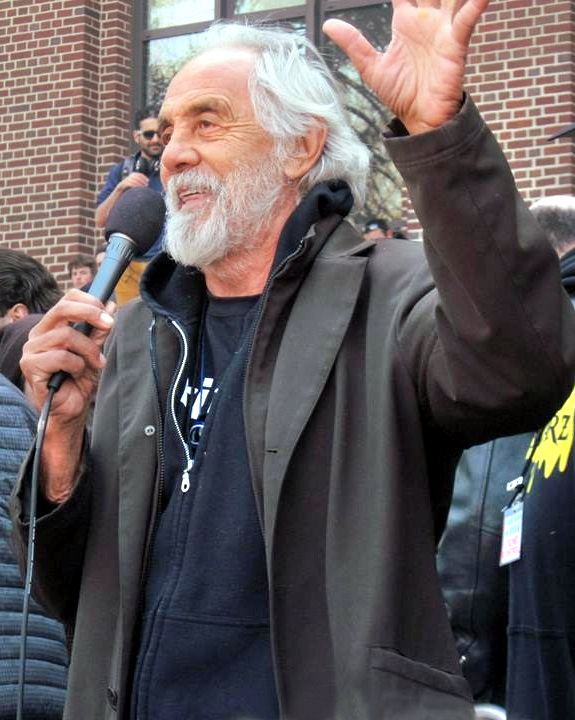
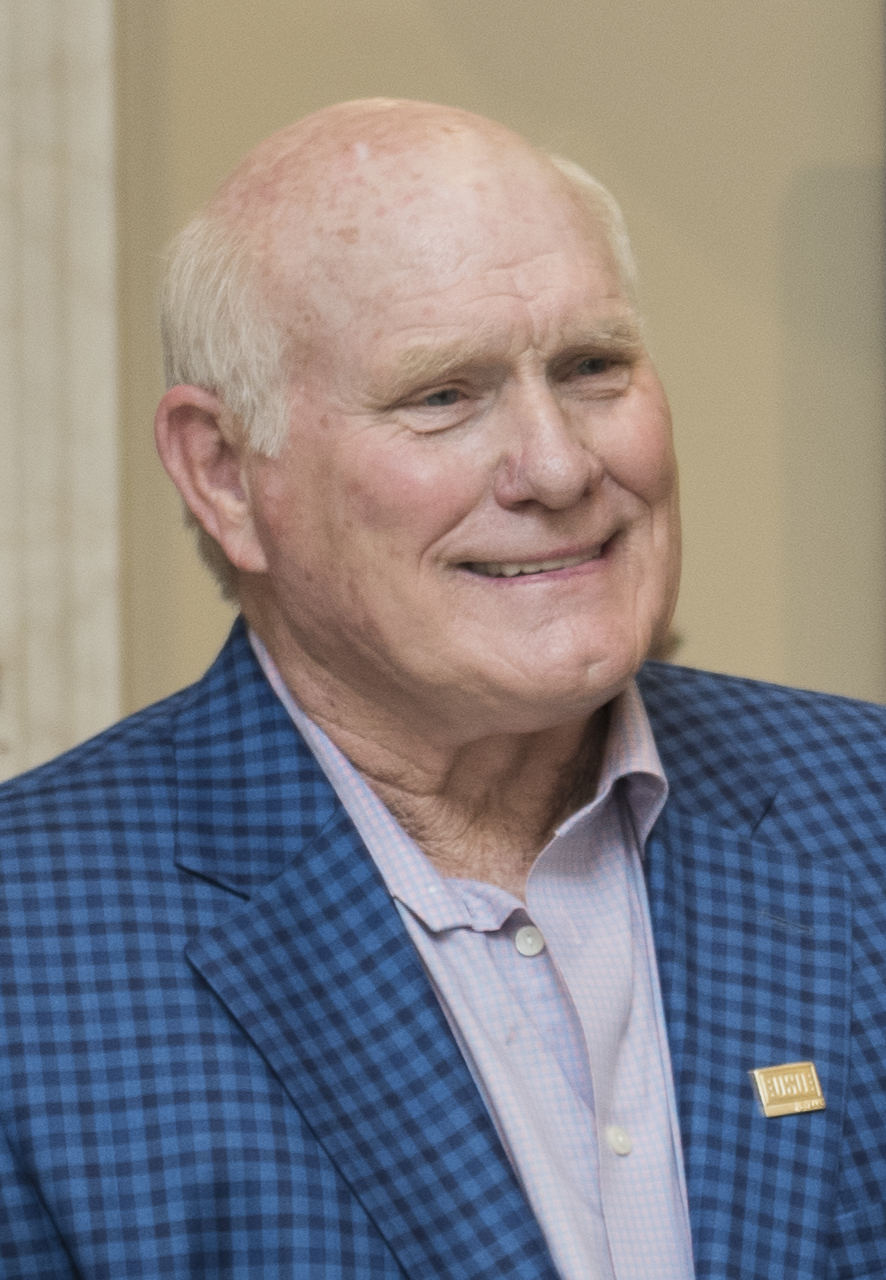
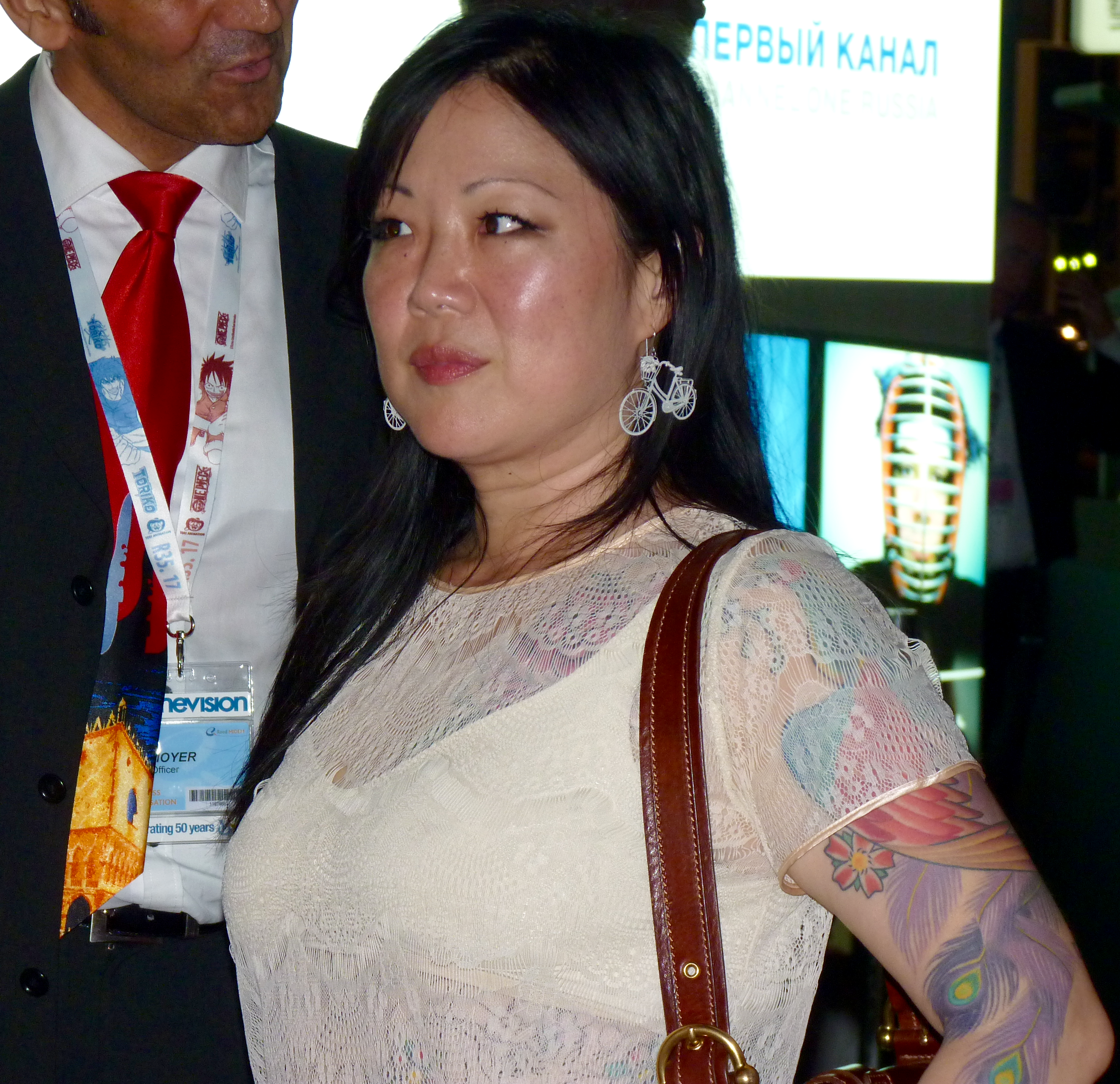
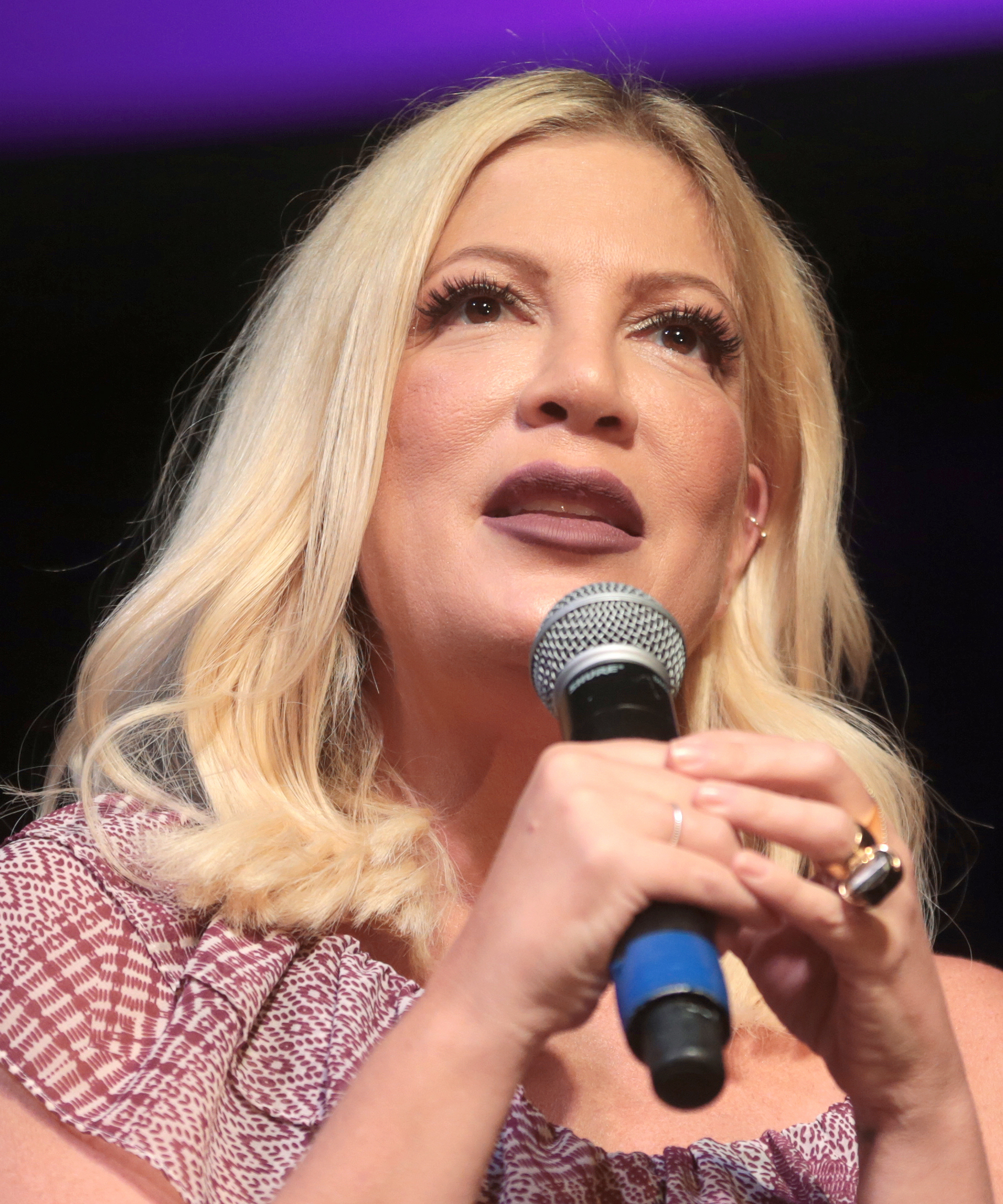
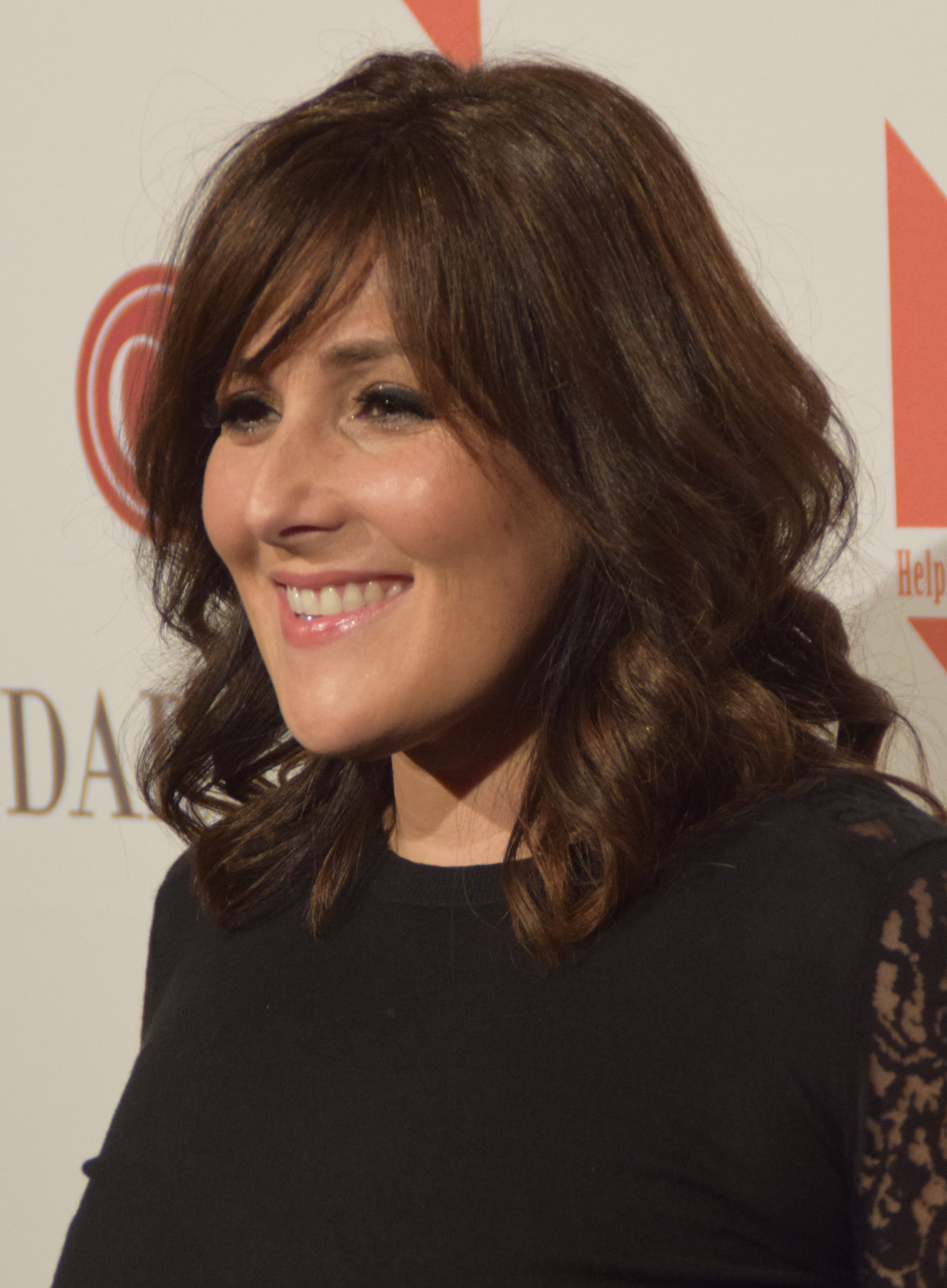
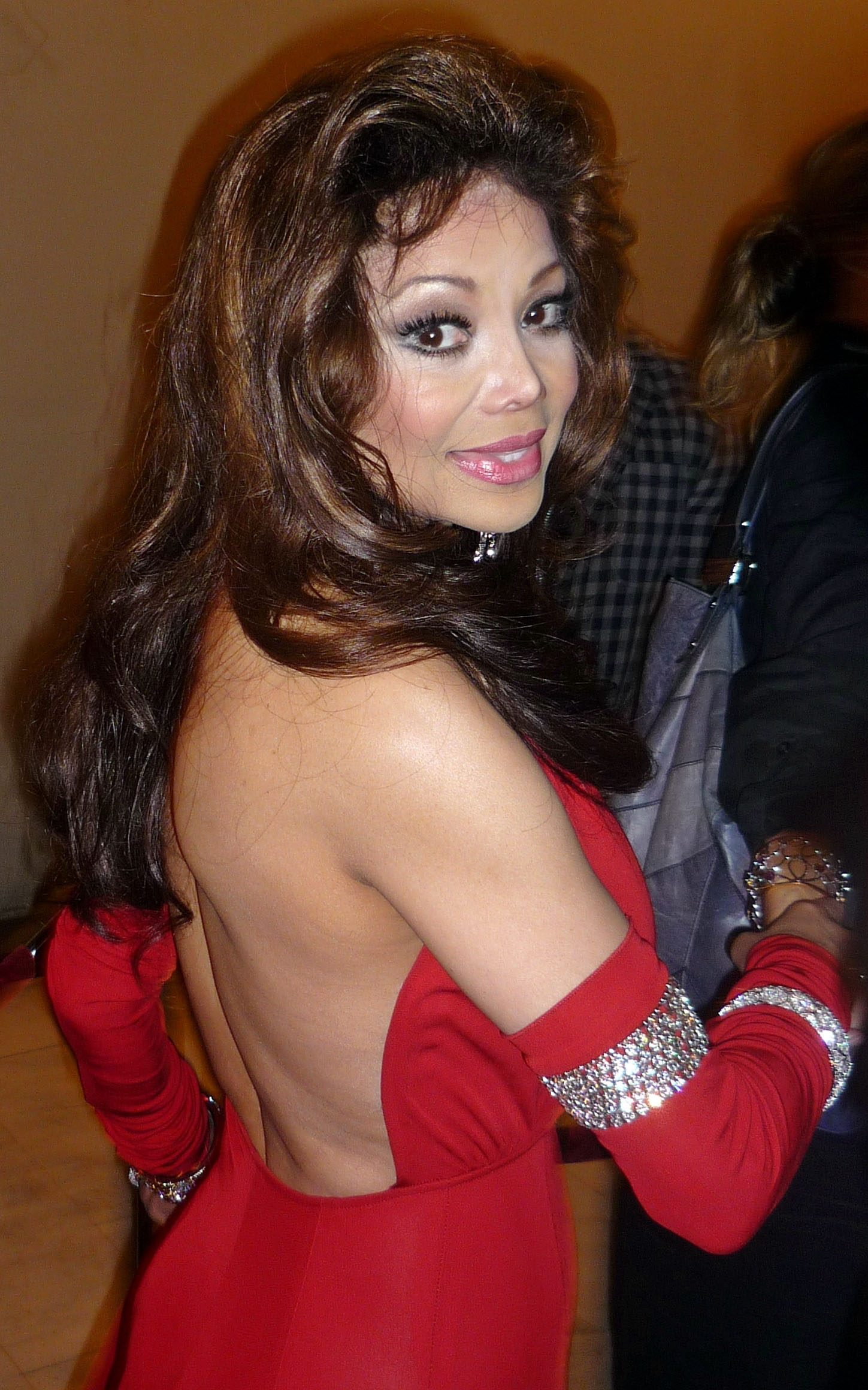
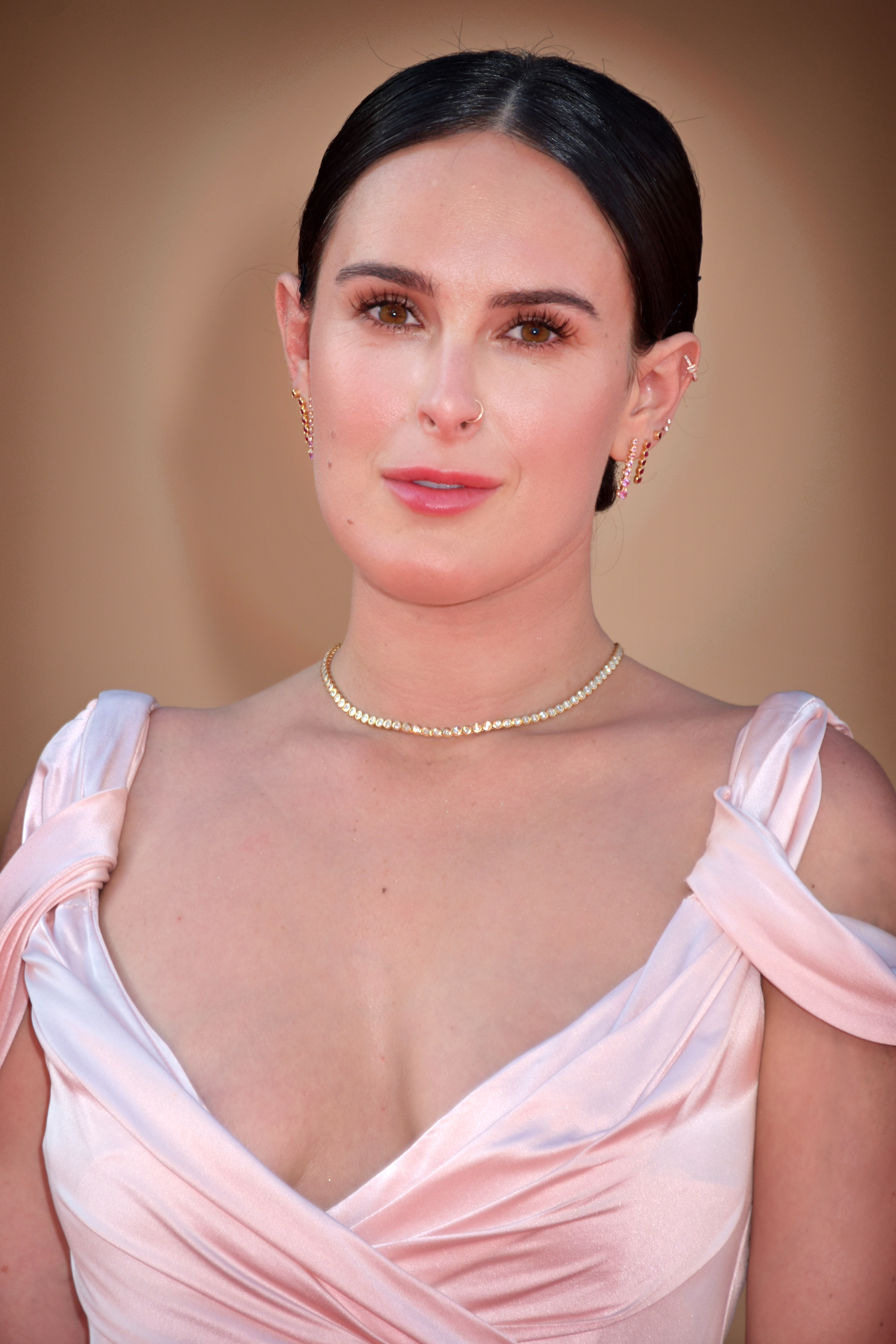
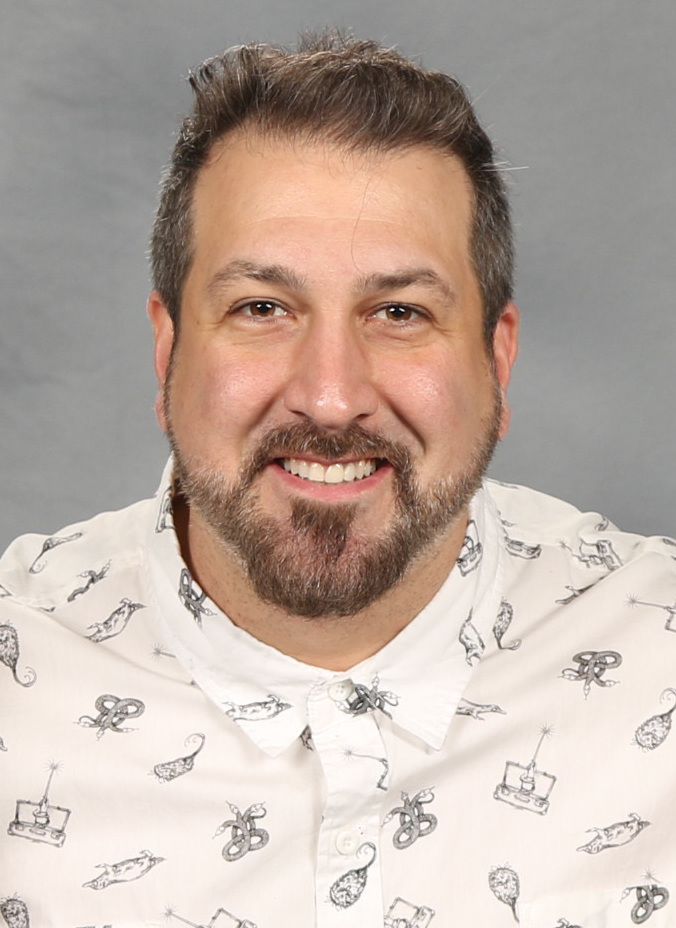
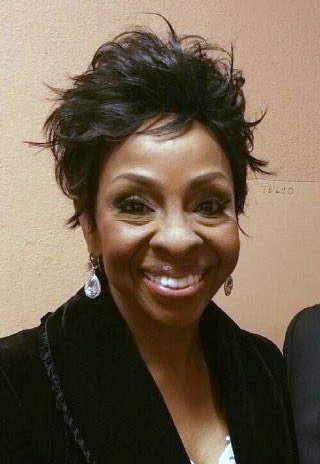
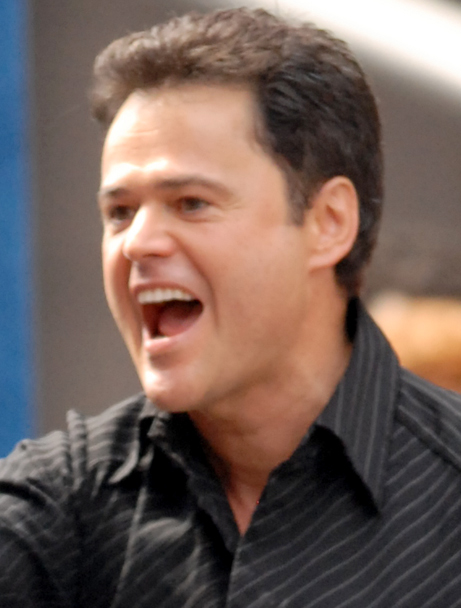
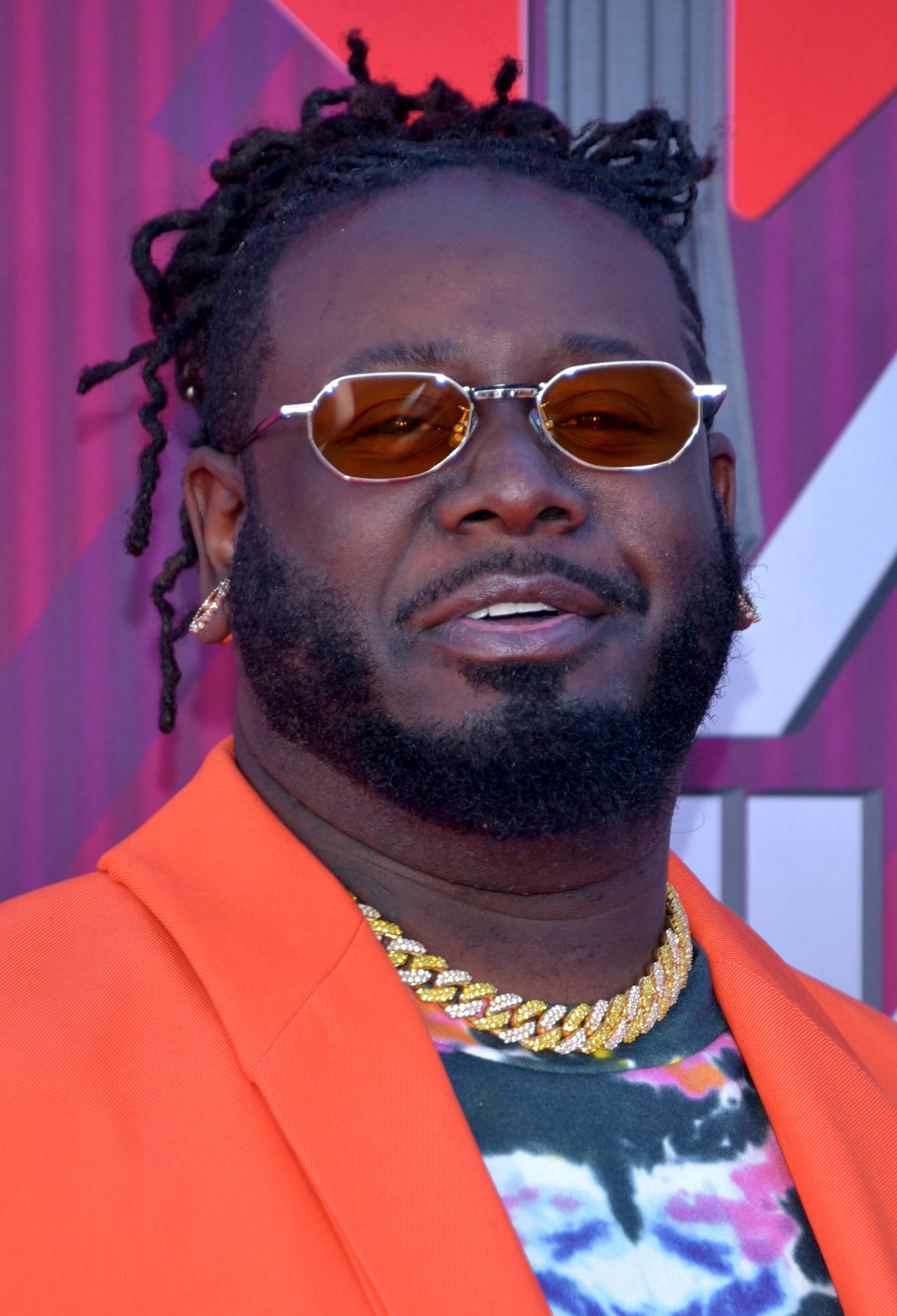
The celebrities who competed in the first season of The Masked Singer, pictured in order of elimination (L–R):
Antonio Brown ("Hippo"), Tommy Chong ("Pineapple"), Terry Bradshaw ("Deer"), Margaret Cho ("Poodle"), Tori Spelling ("Unicorn"), Ricki Lake ("Raven"), La Toya Jackson ("Alien"), Rumer Willis ("Lion"), Joey Fatone ("Rabbit"), Gladys Knight ("Bee"), Donny Osmond ("Peacock"), and T-Pain ("Monster")

== Episodes ==
=== Week 1 (January 2) ===
Performances on the first episode
#	Stage name	Song	Identity	Result
1	Peacock	"The Greatest Show" by Hugh Jackman	undisclosed	WIN
2	Hippo	"My Prerogative" by Bobby Brown	Antonio Brown	OUT
3	Monster	"Don't Stop Me Now" by Queen	undisclosed	RISK
4	Unicorn	"Fight Song" by Rachel Platten	undisclosed	WIN
5	Deer	"Thunder" by Imagine Dragons	undisclosed	RISK
6	Lion	"A Little Party Never Killed Nobody" by Fergie feat. Q-Tip, GoonRock	undisclosed	WIN

=== Week 2 (January 9) ===
Performances on the second episode
#	Stage name	Song	Identity	Result
1	Rabbit	"Livin' la Vida Loca" by Ricky Martin	undisclosed	WIN
2	Alien	"Feel It Still" by Portugal. The Man	undisclosed	RISK
3	Raven	"Rainbow" by Kesha	undisclosed	WIN
4	Pineapple	"I Will Survive" by Gloria Gaynor	Tommy Chong	OUT
5	Poodle	"Heartbreaker" by Pat Benatar	undisclosed	RISK
6	Bee	"Chandelier" by Sia	undisclosed	WIN

=== Week 3 (January 16) ===
Performances on the third episode
#	Stage name	Song	Identity	Result
1	Lion	"Feeling Good" by Nina Simone	undisclosed	SAFE
2	Deer	"Get Your Shine On" by Florida Georgia Line	Terry Bradshaw	OUT
3	Peacock	"Counting Stars" by OneRepublic	undisclosed	SAFE
4	Unicorn	"Oops!... I Did It Again" by Britney Spears	undisclosed	SAFE
5	Monster	"I Don't Want to Be" by Gavin DeGraw	undisclosed	SAFE

=== Week 4 (January 23) ===
Performances on the fourth episode
#	Stage name	Song	Identity	Result
1	Rabbit	"Wake Me Up" by Avicii ft. Aloe Blacc	undisclosed	SAFE
2	Alien	"Lovefool" by The Cardigans	undisclosed	SAFE
3	Raven	"Bad Romance" by Lady Gaga	undisclosed	SAFE
4	Poodle	"Time After Time" by Cyndi Lauper	Margaret Cho	OUT
5	Bee	"Locked Out of Heaven" by Bruno Mars	undisclosed	SAFE

=== Week 5 (January 30) ===
- Group number: "On Top of the World" by Imagine Dragons

Performances on the fifth episode
#	Stage name	Song	Identity	Result
1	Rabbit	"Poison" by Bell Biv DeVoe	undisclosed	SAFE
2	Unicorn	"I Love It" by Icona Pop ft. Charli XCX	Tori Spelling	OUT
3	Alien	"Happy" by Pharrell Williams	undisclosed	SAFE
4	Lion	"California Dreamin'" by Sia	undisclosed	SAFE

=== Week 6 (February 6) ===
- Group number: "I Gotta Feeling" by The Black Eyed Peas

Performances on the sixth episode
#	Stage name	Song	Identity	Result
1	Bee	"Wrecking Ball" by Miley Cyrus	undisclosed	SAFE
2	Peacock	"All of Me" by John Legend	undisclosed	SAFE
3	Raven	"Brave" by Sara Bareilles	Ricki Lake	OUT
4	Monster	"American Woman" by Lenny Kravitz	undisclosed	SAFE

=== Week 7 (February 13) ===
Performances on the seventh episode
#	Stage name	Song	Identity	Result
1	Monster	"I Love Rock 'n' Roll" by Joan Jett & the Blackhearts	undisclosed	SAFE
2	Lion	"Diamond Heart" by Lady Gaga	undisclosed	SAFE
3	Alien	"Ex's & Oh's" by Elle King	La Toya Jackson	OUT
4	Bee	"What's Love Got to Do with It" by Tina Turner	undisclosed	SAFE
5	Rabbit	"Isn't She Lovely" by Stevie Wonder	undisclosed	SAFE
6	Peacock	"Can't Feel My Face" by The Weeknd	undisclosed	SAFE

=== Week 8 (February 20) ===
Performances on the eighth episode
#	Stage name	Song	Identity	Result
1	Peacock	"Let's Go" by Calvin Harris ft. Ne-Yo	undisclosed	SAFE
2	Monster	"Stay With Me" by Sam Smith	undisclosed	SAFE
3	Lion	"Don't You Worry 'Bout a Thing" by Stevie Wonder	Rumer Willis	OUT
4	Rabbit	"My Girl" by The Temptations	Joey Fatone	OUT
5	Bee	"(You Make Me Feel Like) A Natural Woman" by Aretha Franklin	undisclosed	SAFE

=== Week 9 (February 27) – Finale ===
- Group number: "Make Way" by Aloe Blacc

Performances on the final episode
#	Stage name	Song	Identity	Result
1	Peacock	"Shake a Tail Feather" by Ray Charles	Donny Osmond	RUNNER-UP
2	Bee	"I Can't Make You Love Me" by Bonnie Raitt	Gladys Knight	THIRD PLACE
3	Monster	"This Is How We Do It" by Montell Jordan	T-Pain	WINNER

== Reception ==
=== Critical response ===
The premiere episode received mixed reviews. Vulture felt that the series was more entertaining, yet "weirder, sillier, and stupider" than other U.S. music competition programs, and described the format as having the "vibe" of "what if [Philadelphia Flyers mascot] Gritty walked out on a soundstage made to look like an arena concert, belted out Sam Smith's 'Stay With Me,' was described as 'a professional' by Jenny McCarthy Wahlberg, took off his head to reveal he was Joey Fatone, and the entire experience felt three clicks away from an episode of Black Mirror?" The panelists were considered to be "weak" and "[approaching] their jobs with all the insight and acumen of an America's Next Top Model contestant trying to decipher the Tyra Mail", and that the performances were "underwhelming" (using Ryan Reynolds' surprise appearance on the Korean version singing "Tomorrow" in a "low-rent" unicorn mask as a benchmark) due to the contestants not always being singers. However, the format was deemed to have depth for being "a pretty fascinating examination of celebrity culture, mass appeal, performance, image, and fame."

Emily Yahr of The Washington Post described the premiere episode as "one of the craziest reality shows of our time", acknowledging other similar reactions to the series.

=== Ratings ===
The show's premiere was the highest rated unscripted television series debut since The X Factor in 2011. Following three days of DVR viewing, the first episode's 18–49 rating grew by 30 percent—the highest increase ever for a premiere in the show's genre. Although initially dropping, ratings grew towards the end of the season, and the finale became the most watched episode. According to Comscore, the show had one of the highest viewer engagement levels of any series during the week the finale aired. It concluded the 2018–19 television season as the highest rated new series among adults 18–49, averaging a 2.6 rating throughout all ten episodes, and as the highest rated entertainment series among teenagers, men 18–34, adults 18–34, and adults 18–49. The show was the first unscripted series to rank number one in the genre in its first season since Joe Millionaire in 2003, and was one of the reasons why Fox was the only network to gain viewers compared to the previous television season.

Viewership and ratings per episode of The Masked Singer (American TV series) season 1
No.	Title	Air date	Timeslot (ET)	Rating/share (18–49)	Viewers (millions)	DVR (18–49)	DVR viewers (millions)	Total (18–49)	Total viewers (millions)
1	"Season Premiere: Mask On Face Off"	January 2, 2019	Wednesday 9:00 p.m.	3.0/12	9.36	1.2	3.60	4.2	12.97
2	"New Masks on the Block"	January 9, 2019	Wednesday 9:00 p.m.	2.3/10	7.07	1.4	3.81	3.7	10.89
3	"Five Masks No More"	January 16, 2019	Wednesday 9:00 p.m.	2.2/9	6.94	1.3	3.61	3.5	10.56
4	"Another Mask Bites the Dust"	January 23, 2019	Wednesday 9:00 p.m.	2.3/9	7.14	1.4	3.85	3.7	11.01
5	"Mix and Masks"	January 30, 2019	Wednesday 9:00 p.m.	2.6/11	7.87	1.1	3.33	3.7	11.21
6	"Touchy Feely Clues"	February 6, 2019	Wednesday 9:00 p.m.	2.2/9	7.13	1.2	3.30	3.4	10.44
7	"All Together Now"	February 13, 2019	Wednesday 9:00 p.m.	2.4/11	7.84	1.3	3.52	3.6	11.37
8	"Semi Finals: Double Unmasking"	February 20, 2019	Wednesday 9:00 p.m.	2.7/11	8.27	1.1	3.11	3.8	11.38
9	"Road to the Finals"	February 27, 2019	Wednesday 8:00 p.m.	2.6/12	8.58	0.7	2.18	3.4	10.77
10	"Season Finale: The Final Mask is Lifted"	February 27, 2019	Wednesday 9:00 p.m.	3.6/15	11.47	0.9	2.74	4.5	14.22
