= I Can't Help Myself (Sugar Pie Honey Bunch) =

1965 single by the Four Tops

Single by Four Tops

from the album Four Tops Second Album
- B-side: "Sad Souvenirs"
- Released: April 23, 1965
- Recorded: 1965
- Studio: Hitsville U.S.A. (Studio A), Detroit, Michigan
- Genre: Soul, pop
- Length: 2:46
- Label: Motown
- Songwriter: Holland–Dozier–Holland
- Producers: Brian Holland; Lamont Dozier; Eddie Holland

Four Tops singles chronology
"Ask the Lonely" (1965)	"I Can't Help Myself (Sugar Pie Honey Bunch)" (1965)	"It's the Same Old Song" (1965)

"I Can't Help Myself" is a 1965 song recorded by the Four Tops for the Motown label.

Written and produced by Motown's main production team Holland–Dozier–Holland, "I Can't Help Myself" is one of the most well-known Motown recordings of the 1960s and among the decade's biggest hits. The single topped the Billboard's R&B chart for nine weeks (being named the biggest R&B single of the year by Billboard) and also peaked at No. 1 on the Hot 100 for two non-consecutive weeks, from June 12 to June 19 and from June 26 to July 3 in 1965. It replaced "Back in My Arms Again" by label mates the Supremes. It was first unseated at No. 1 by "Mr. Tambourine Man" by the Byrds, then regained the top spot before being replaced by the Rolling Stones' "(I Can't Get No) Satisfaction". Billboard ranked the record as the second biggest single of 1965. "I Can't Help Myself" was the Four Tops' first top 40 single in the UK, peaking at No. 23 at the end of 1965, then reaching No. 10 in its early 1970 re-release.

== Composition ==
The song finds lead singer Levi Stubbs, assisted by the other three Tops and the Andantes, pleadingly professing his love to a woman: "Sugar pie, honey bunch/I'm weaker than a man should be!/Can't help myself/I'm a fool in love, you see." The melodic and chordal progressions are very similar to the Supremes' 1964 hit "Where Did Our Love Go", also written by Holland-Dozier-Holland. According to AllMusic critic Ed Hogan, the title "I Can't Help Myself" is an oblique acknowledgment by Dozier that he could not resist recycling his previous hit. The bracketed title "Sugar Pie, Honey Bunch" appears only on certain oldie reissues of the single.

== Reception ==
Billboard described the song as a "spirited, fast-paced wailer performed in [the Four Tops'] unique style." Cash Box described it as "a rollicking hand-clappin' thumper about a fella who is delighted 'cause he's head-over-heels with the gal of his dreams." Record World said that the "Tops will be helping themselves right up the charts with this grinding number about love."

Rolling Stone magazine ranked the song at No. 483 on their list of The 500 Greatest Songs of All Time. It has been covered extensively since 1965, including versions done for several television commercials. In 2019, Applebee's used the song for one of their advertisements.

== Personnel ==
- Lead vocals by Levi Stubbs
- Background vocals by Abdul "Duke" Fakir, Renaldo "Obie" Benson, Lawrence Payton, and the Andantes: Jackie Hicks, Marlene Barrow, and Louvain Demps
- Instrumentation by the Funk Brothers and the Detroit Symphony Orchestra (strings)
  - Bass by James Jamerson
  - Drums by Benny Benjamin
  - Baritone saxophone by Mike Terry
- Written by Brian Holland, Lamont Dozier, and Edward Holland, Jr.
- Produced by Brian Holland and Lamont Dozier

== Charts ==
1965 weekly chart performance for "I Can't Help Myself (Sugar Pie Honey Bunch)"
Chart (1965)	Peak position
Canada CHUM Chart	4
UK Singles Chart	23
US Billboard Hot 100	1
US R&B (Billboard)	1

1970 weekly chart performance for "I Can't Help Myself (Sugar Pie Honey Bunch)"
Chart (1970)	Peak position
UK Singles Chart	10

== Certifications ==
Certifications for "I Can't Help Myself (Sugar Pie Honey Bunch)"
Region	Certification	Certified units/sales
Denmark (IFPI Danmark)	Gold	45,000^{‡}
New Zealand (RMNZ)	3× Platinum	90,000^{‡}
Spain (Promusicae)	Gold	30,000^{‡}
United Kingdom (BPI)	2× Platinum	1,200,000^{‡}
^{‡} Sales+streaming figures based on certification alone.

== Bonnie Pointer version ==
In 1980, Bonnie Pointer had a disco crossover hit in the United States, with the song peaking at No. 40 on the pop singles chart, No. 42 on the soul singles chart, and No. 4 on the dance chart. In Canada, it reached No. 43 on the RPM Top 100 Singles chart. The song also peaked at No. 52 in Australia.

== La Toya Jackson version ==
"I Can't Help Myself"

Single by La Toya Jackson

from the album Stop in the Name of Love
- B-side: "Baby Love"
- Released: April 25, 1995
- Genre: Pop
- Length: 3:58 (single edit)
- Label: CMC Records, Koch International
- Composer: Holland–Dozier–Holland
- Lyricist: Holland–Dozier–Holland
- Producer: Peter Holm

La Toya Jackson singles chronology
"Let's Rock the House" (1992)	"I Can't Help Myself" (1995)	"Don't Break My Heart" (1998)

"I Can't Help Myself" was recorded by American singer La Toya Jackson for her ninth studio album Stop in the Name of Love, which consists of Motown covers. "I Can't Help Myself" was released as the album's only single in April 1995. The single's B-side, a cover of the Supremes' "Baby Love", is also from the album.

=== Track listing ===
No.	Title	Writer(s)	Length
1.	"I Can't Help Myself"	Holland–Dozier–Holland	3:30
2.	"Baby Love"	Holland–Dozier–Holland	3:19

== Other versions ==
The Supremes recorded a cover of the song between 1965 and 1966, released on their album, The Supremes A' Go-Go. Their backing band, the Funk Brothers, was also the Four Tops' backing band at the time and comprising most, if not all, of the same musicians as on the original chart-topping single. In 1967, the Four Tops themselves recorded a special Italian language version, entitled "Piangono gli uomini" ("The Men Cry").

In the winter of 1969, Johnny Rivers covered the song. His rendition became a No. 2 hit in South Africa.

Donnie Elbert hit No. 22 on the Billboard Hot 100 in 1972 with his cover of the song. In Canada, it reached No. 37.

A cover by American country music group Billy Hill peaked at No. 58 on the Billboard Hot Country Singles chart in 1989.

The Motorcity All-Stars released a rerecorded version of song in 1989 on Ian Levine's Motown revival label Motorcity. The ensemble group was put together from as many former Motown singers as producer Levine could assemble. Levi Stubbs's brother Joe called Levi over to record the song, and both brothers feature on the track, along with singers Sammy Ward, Cal Gill of the Velvelettes, and Carolyn Crawford and C.P. Spencer of the Originals, all of whom had previously recorded at Motown. Many other former Motown associates can be seen in the background of the accompanying video, including Berry Gordy's ex-wife Raynoma Gordy Singleton and former head of artist development Maxine Powell.

In 1992, Australian girl group Teen Queens released a version that peaked at No. 28 on the Australian Singles Chart.

American musician Kid Rock performed the song in concert during his 2013 tour. He included a cover of the song on his 2017 album Sweet Southern Sugar under the title "Sugar Pie Honey Bunch".
