= La Toya: Growing Up in the Jackson Family =

1991 book by La Toya Jackson

La Toya: Growing up in the Jackson Family
- Author: La Toya Jackson with Patricia Romanowski
- Language: English
- Genre: Autobiography
- Publisher: Dutton
- Publication date: February 7, 1991
- Publication place: United States
- Media type: Hardcover
- Pages: 261
- ISBN: 0-451-17415-1
- OCLC: 26625891
- LC Class: ML420.J16 A3

La Toya: Growing up in the Jackson Family is an autobiography written by American singer La Toya Jackson, and co-authored by celebrity biography author Patricia Romanowski. The book was originally released on February 7, 1991, around the same time as Jackson's seventh studio album No Relations.

In this autobiography, Jackson accuses her father, Joseph, of child abuse, and goes into detail on the personal lives of her superstar siblings Michael and Janet as well as Jermaine, Randy, Tito, and Rebbie Jackson's struggle under the spotlight. Katherine Jackson and Joseph denied all of her allegations initially. However, Michael confirmed on Michael Jackson Talks ... to Oprah in 1993 that Joseph's beatings were every bit as extreme as La Toya had claimed.

At the time the book was written, Jackson was married to her reportedly abusive manager Jack Gordon, who she now accuses of inserting his own stories into her autobiography to embarrass her family and make her appear to be a "drama queen".

Jackson reunited with her family in the late 1990s after leaving Gordon. On her interview with Larry King in 2003 she said that she respectfully accepted her father's apologies for the way he treated her and her siblings as children. The autobiography was re-issued under various titles throughout the 1990s. The original hardcover edition spent several weeks atop the New York Times Bestseller List.

In the weeks leading up to the release of the book, Gordon ordered that the transcript be kept in a high-security vault out of fear that the Jackson family would attempt to sabotage the project.
