= Don't Break My Heart (La Toya Jackson song) =

Single by La Toya Jackson and Tom Beser
- Released: 1998
- Recorded: 1998
- Genre: Eurodance
- Length: 3:58 (Radio dance mix)
- Label: EMI
- Producer: Tom Beser

La Toya Jackson singles chronology
"I Can't Help Myself" (1995)	"Don't Break My Heart" (1998)	"Just Wanna Dance" (2004)

"Don't Break My Heart" is a single by American singer La Toya Jackson, which features a rap and background vocals by Tom Beser. It was Jackson's last single of the 1990s.

The 5" maxi single features seven mixes and a special German message from Jackson.

Jackson, having recently divorced, stepped out of the project before the release, and Beser promoted the record on German TV show Arabella with an impersonator. Jackson returned to U.S. charts with the 2004 hit "Just Wanna Dance".

== Track listings ==
5" Maxi CD (DE #ISSM 57209)

1. Radio Dance Mix (4:07)
2. Ultimative Dance Mix (4:50)
3. Ballad Mix (3:35)
4. Unplugged Mix (3:20)
5. Slow Mix (3:56)
6. Maharaja Club Mix (5:26)
7. Extended Fox Mix (5:27)
8. La Toya's Personal Message (0:28)
