= Formidable (La Toya Jackson album) =

Soundtrack album by La Toya Jackson
- Released: 1992
- Label: WMD

La Toya Jackson chronology
No Relations (1991)	Formidable (1992)	From Nashville to You (1994)

Formidable is the soundtrack to the show performed at the Moulin Rouge in Paris, France by American singer La Toya Jackson. Only 3,000 copies were created and it has become one of the most sought-after albums by her fans.

To promote the show, Jackson paid homage to La Goulue by visiting her grave in Montmartre Cemetery. Jackson also cited Josephine Baker as an influence. L'Express hailed Jackson as "the new Josephine Baker." According to academic Bennetta Jules-Rosette, "Through careful planning, she was able to model a successful part of her career abroad on the master tropes of a Baker-like image. Jackson exemplifies Baudrillard's notion that neither the message nor the content count as much as the referentiality of the signifier in postmodern performative discourse."

Jackson was the main attraction at the Moulin Rouge for four months, at which point she broke her contract and was ordered by the French courts to pay $550,000 in damages to the owners of Moulin Rouge.

== Track listing ==
1. "Les Doriss Girls"
2. "Les Touristes"
3. "Formidable"*
4. "Paris En Rose"
5. "À Paris, Les Femmes Ressemblent A Des Fleurs"*
6. "Les Garçons Du Désert"*
7. "Le Marche"
8. "Les Filles Aux Serpents"
9. "Night Club"*
10. "Les Crocodiles"
11. "Les Tapis Volants"*
12. "La Fontaine Lumineuse"*
13. "Allons À L'Opera"
14. "Valses De Vienne"
15. "French Cancan"
16. "La Danse Nouvelle - Jeanne Avril Et Bruant"*
17. "Une Pensée Pour Maurice"
18. "Un Clin D'œil À Joséphine"
19. "Locomotion"*
20. French Medley ("Non je ne regrette rien", "La vie en rose", "Paris, je t'aime")*
21. "Grand Final Blanc Et Rouge - Formidable"*

Note

- An asterisk (*) notates songs where La Toya performed.
