= La Toya Jackson =

American singer (born 1956)

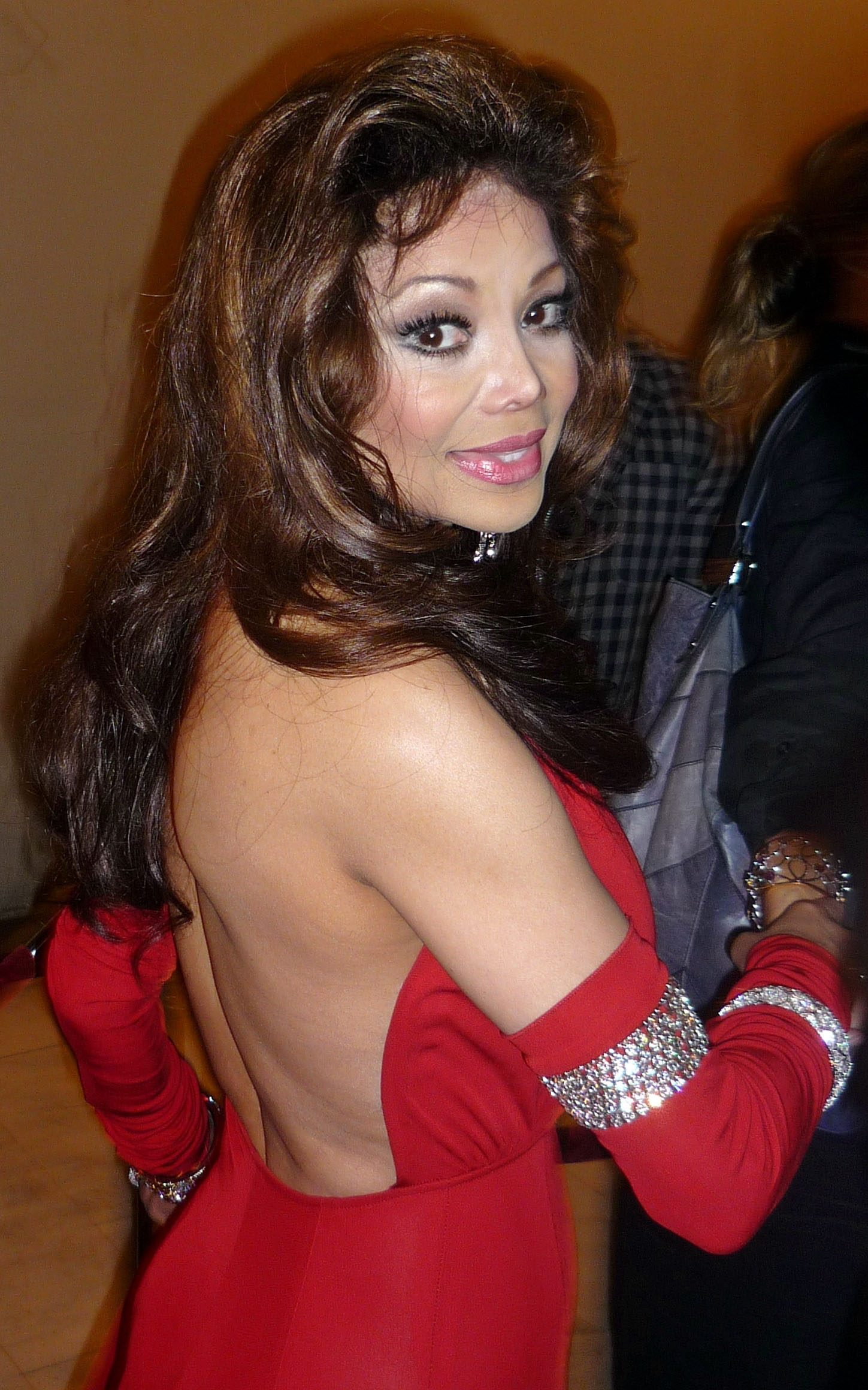
- Jackson in 2010
- Born: La Toya Yvonne Jackson; May 29, 1956 (age 70); Gary, Indiana, U.S.
- Other name: Toy
- Occupations: Singer; television personality
- Years active: 1974–present
- Notable work: Discography
- Spouse: Jack Gordon (m. 1989; div. 1997)
- Parents: Joe Jackson; Katherine Jackson
- Family: Jackson
- Musical career
- Genres: R&B; pop; dance
- Labels: Polydor; Epic; CBS/Columbia; Luco Music Group; RCA; Jive; Pump/Dino/WMG; Bungalo/Universal Records

La Toya Yvonne Jackson (born May 29, 1956) is an American singer and television personality. She is the fifth child and middle daughter of the Jackson family. Jackson first gained recognition on the family's variety television series, The Jacksons, on CBS between 1976 and 1977. Thereafter, she saw success as a solo recording artist under multiple record labels in the 1980s and 1990s, including Polydor, Sony Music and RCA, where she released nine studio albums over the course of 15 years. Her most successful releases in the United States were her self-titled debut album (1980) and the 1984 single "Heart Don't Lie". Jackson's other songs include "Night Time Lover", "If You Feel the Funk", "Bet'cha Gonna Need My Lovin'", "Hot Potato", "You're Gonna Get Rocked!", and "Sexbox". Another one of Jackson's songs, "Just Say No" from her fifth album, was composed for U.S. First Lady Nancy Reagan and Reagan administration's anti-drug campaign.

She is a two time New York Times best-selling author. Jackson posed for Playboy magazine in March 1989 and again in 1991 to promote her book La Toya: Growing Up in the Jackson Family, she was on the cover on both the March 1989 issue & the November 1991 issue and also was in a Playboy Video Centerfold.

In 1992, Jackson signed a contract with the Moulin Rouge in Paris to star in the successful revue, Formidable.

Despite subsequent musical success, Jackson's recording career began its decline in the 1990s as a result of her controversial marriage to entertainment manager Jack Gordon, whom she divorced in 1997. After a period of public seclusion, she returned to the music industry in 2004 with the singles "Just Wanna Dance", "Home", and "Free the World", which saw success on the Hot Dance Club Play chart in the United States. In 2011, she was a contestant on the fourth installment of The Celebrity Apprentice and released an extended play, Starting Over, which is her most recent release to date and was released alongside her best-selling autobiography.

In the last decade, Jackson began making regular appearances in reality television, which include the British version of Celebrity Big Brother (2009), two seasons of The Celebrity Apprentice (2011, 2013), her own reality television series on the Oprah Winfrey Network, Life with La Toya, which aired for two seasons (2013–2014); and three international versions of The Masked Singer (2019, 2021, 2023).

== Life and career ==
=== 1956–1979: Early life and The Jacksons ===
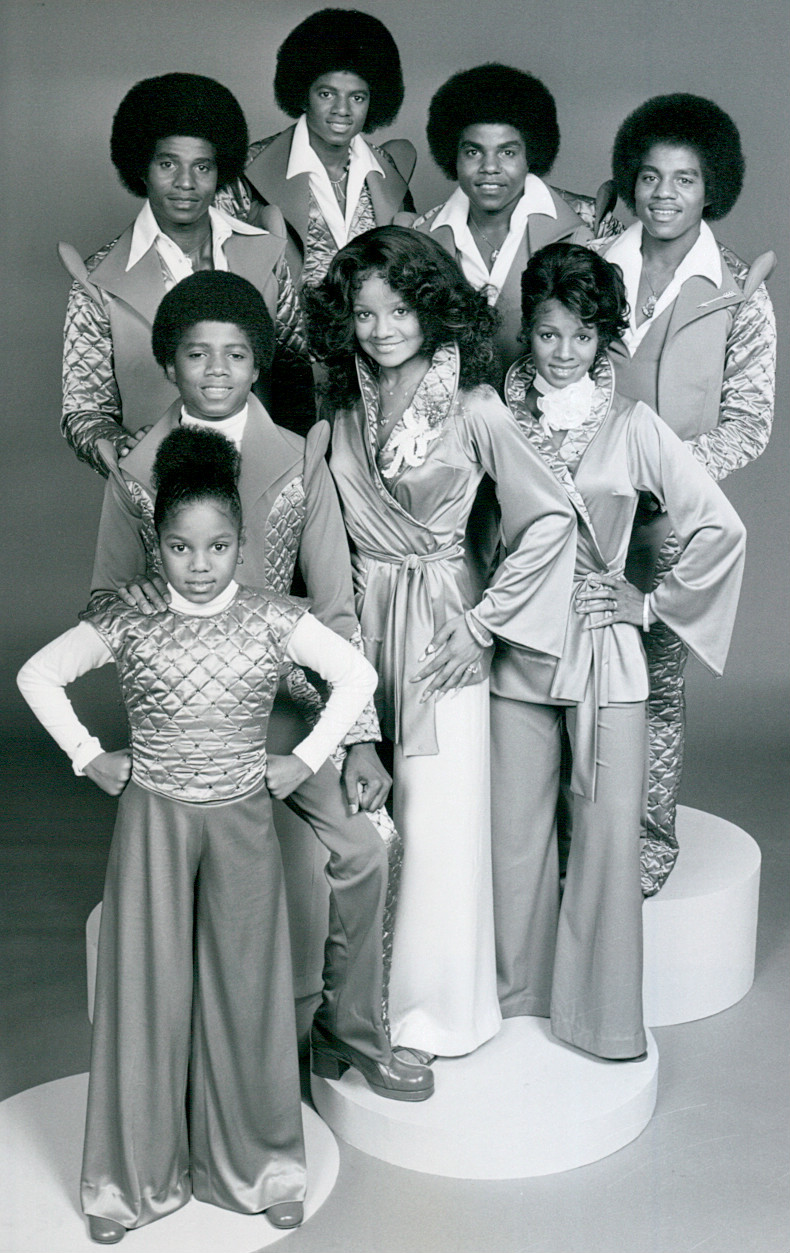
From left, back row: Jackie Jackson, Michael Jackson, Tito Jackson, Marlon Jackson. Middle row: Randy Jackson, La Toya Jackson, Rebbie Jackson. Front row: Janet Jackson (1977)

Born on her sister Rebbie's 6th birthday on May 29, 1956, at St Mary's Mercy Hospital in Gary, Indiana, La Toya Jackson is the fifth of ten children born to Joe and Katherine Jackson and the middle female child between Rebbie and Janet. Growing up, La Toya tended to be shy. After her mother became a member of the Jehovah's Witnesses in 1966, La Toya, along with the rest of her siblings followed. She would spend some of her time alongside her mother preaching door-to-door. "Every morning, Michael and I witnessed, knocking on doors around Los Angeles, spreading the word of Jehovah." By 1974, at seventeen, La Toya joined her brothers in the spotlight with a tap dancing routine when her father arranged for them to perform shows in Las Vegas, among other cities. La Toya attended the California Prep school in Encino, Los Angeles, California, and aspired to be an attorney specializing in business law. She attended college for a short time before her father insisted that she pursue a career in show business like the rest of the family.

In 1976 and 1977, La Toya and her sisters Rebbie and Janet appeared in all twelve episodes of The Jacksons–a CBS-TV variety program, with their brothers Jackie, Tito, Marlon, Michael, and Randy. Along with their brothers (except Jermaine, who stayed at Motown and left the family group when his brothers moved to Epic Records), La Toya and her sisters sang, danced, and performed skits. In 1977, during the filming of The Wiz, La Toya traveled with her brother Michael (who was cast as the Scarecrow), to New York. Sharing an apartment, it was the first time either of them had lived elsewhere as adults. Close siblings, Michael and La Toya would not move out of the family's Encino home until they were 29 and 31 respectively. Her dates during this period included Diana Ross' brother Chico and a young David Gest. Jackson also dated Bobby DeBarge and was the inspiration for Switch's 1979 hit "I Call Your Name".

Under Joe Jackson's tutelage, Rebbie, La Toya and Janet formed a short-lived musical group. However, they never performed live and soon separated because of creative differences about the act's future direction. Consequently, no related material was ever released by the trio. The next year, La Toya began work on her first solo album.

=== 1980–1987: Solo debut and follow-up albums ===
In 1980, Jackson released her self-titled debut album. In order to distinguish herself from her famous brothers, The Jacksons, La Toya only wanted her first name on the album. "I begged just to have it 'La Toya'. But my father said, 'It's your last name. You got to use it.' But I wanted to see what I could do as an individual." The first single "If You Feel the Funk", became a modest hit, climbing into the Top 40 of the US R&B chart. Her second single, "Night Time Lover", was produced by younger brother Michael, who provided backing vocals and co-wrote the song with La Toya. In turn, she provided the opening scream on her brothers', The Jacksons, 1980 hit, "This Place Hotel" as well as backing vocals on brother Michael's 1983 solo hit "P.Y.T. (Pretty Young Thing)". The La Toya Jackson album peaked at number 116 on the US Billboard 200, number 26 on the Billboard R&B album chart, and number 178 on the UK Albums Chart, making it her highest placing album.

In 1981, Jackson released a follow-up album, My Special Love, which generated two singles, "Stay the Night" and "I Don't Want You to Go".

1984 saw the release of Jackson's Heart Don't Lie. Jackson scored her biggest Billboard Hot 100 hit with the title track, which peaked at number 56. Other singles from this album were "Bet'cha Gonna Need My Lovin'", "Hot Potato", and a cover of Prince's "Private Joy." Jackson and Amir Bayyan co-wrote "Reggae Night" for Heart Don't Lie but the track did not make the cut. Jimmy Cliff's recording of the song was a hit and was nominated for a Grammy. Cliff commissioned Jackson to write two more songs: "Brown Eyes" and "American Sweet."

In 1984, Jackson licensed her name to a fashion line; "David Laurenz for La Toya." Apparel in the collection included Jackson's signature leather headbands. Jackson starred in television and print advertisements for Nikon cameras and the following year she became the spokesmodel for cosmetics firm Mahogany Image and launched her own eponymous fragrance, La Toya.

"Baby Sister"
A sample from "Baby Sister", a single by La Toya Jackson.

In 1985, Jackson participated on the single "We Are the World", an appeal for famine relief in Ethiopia. That same year Jackson featured in anti-drug music video "Stop the Madness". Her 1985 single "Baby Sister" received one of five Outstanding Song Awards at the sixteenth annual World Popular Song Festival in Japan. "Baby Sister" was included on the 1986 album Imagination, released just before Jackson's record label, Private-I, went bankrupt resulting in poor promotion. Jackson went on to record two duets; "Oops, Oh No!" with Cerrone, and "Yes, I'm Ready" with artist Jed. In 1987 Jackson was featured as a special guest at Minako Honda's DISPA (Disco Party) concert, joining in for the song, "Funkytown".

=== 1988–1991: Public notoriety, abuse and exile from the Jackson family ===
In 1987, Jack Gordon was hired to co-manage La Toya by her father, Joseph. He later took over her management completely. Under Gordon's management, Jackson's public image became increasingly sexualized. Katherine Jackson recalled her shock seeing La Toya dance in a suggestive manner in 1988 for the first time in her autobiography My Family, The Jacksons: "she'd been so conservative that she'd once dropped a friend who had begun wearing low-cut tops and skirts with slits in them." Katherine believed that Gordon was distancing La Toya from her family so he could "become the dominating influence in her life." Around this time Jackson was disfellowshipped by the Jehovah's Witnesses. Defying her father, Jackson made a stormy exit from the family's Encino compound to take up residence in New York City. In late 1988, Jackson released the album La Toya, which featured the singles "You're Gonna Get Rocked!" and "(Ain't Nobody Loves You) Like I Do". The album also included a track titled "Just Say No", which was written for the Reagan administration's anti-drug campaign. The album included four tracks produced by Full Force, and three by Stock Aitken Waterman.

In March 1989, Jackson posed topless for Playboy magazine. Jackson saw the pictorial as a declaration of independence from her conservative upbringing and "to show my parents they couldn't dictate to me any more—that I control my life." In 1989, Jackson began recording her sixth album Bad Girl. That year Jackson staged a live pay-per-view concert, A Sizzling Spectacular!, from Bally's theatre in Reno. The show featured special guest star Edgar Winter.

On September 5, 1989, after her Sizzling Spectacular concert in Nevada, Gordon and Jackson were married. Jackson later claimed she had been forcibly married, with Gordon claiming it was for her own protection against kidnapping by her family. La Toya Jackson states that this was both unplanned and against her wishes. According to Jackson, "I told him, 'No way, Jack! I can't marry you. You know what marriage means to me. I've never been in love; I don't even date... It's not right. I don't love you. I don't have feelings for you.'" Jackson told Ebony magazine the marriage was "strictly in name only. It has never been consummated." Six months into the marriage, Jackson asked Gordon for an annulment when in Rome, Italy. In response, Gordon repeatedly bashed her head against the corner of the hotel room table saying that he would never let her go. Paparazzi subsequently photographed Jackson with black eyes, which Gordon claimed were caused by an intruder. From this point forward, Jackson lost all contact with her family and wrote an autobiography, La Toya: Growing Up in the Jackson Family, which accused her father of physical abuse. She posed again in Playboy in November 1991 to promote the autobiography. She later said that she initially refused to pose for the second spread, however, Gordon beat her into submission.

For roughly the next decade Gordon controlled Jackson with threats, lies, and routine domestic violence. According to Jackson, "When he hit me, the first time I was in shock, I just recalled my ear ringing, just ringing so hard." Gordon confiscated Jackson's passport, transferred her bank accounts into his name, hired bodyguards to watch La Toya constantly and banned her from speaking to or seeing her family, monitoring her every phone call. La Toya's father Joseph stated in his book The Jacksons that he believed Gordon brainwashed La Toya and made her fearful of her own family. Katherine also believed that La Toya had been brainwashed while Gordon claimed that Katherine had tried to kill her daughter. Sister Janet concurred with her parents saying at the time, "I think this guy who is with her has brainwashed her and made her like this... He keeps her away from the family, and now he's brainwashed her so much she keeps herself away from us."

In 1990, Jackson participated in the Sanremo Music Festival, entering "You and Me" an English-language version of "Verso l'ignoto" by siblings Marcella and Gianni Bella. While "You and Me" did not win Best Song, it entered Italy's hit parade, peaking at number twenty-eight. That year Jackson signed on with German-based BCM Records and released the single "Why Don't You Want My Love?" Jackson recorded other material with BCM, but the label went bankrupt and album plans were scrapped. Jackson signed with Dino Records quickly thereafter. 1991 saw the release of No Relations, an album with strong house and funk influences. This album featured Jackson's top twenty-five Netherlands hit "Sexbox".

=== 1992–2002: Moulin Rouge cabaret, financial difficulties, and escape ===
In 1992, Jackson signed a contract with the Moulin Rouge in Paris to star in her own revue, Formidable. Jackson was to perform two shows a night, six nights a week. Jackson was the highest-paid performer in the cabaret's history, earning a reported $5 million. Though Formidable was successful, selling out on most nights, Jackson departed half-way into her year-long contract owing the nightclub $550,000 in damages. In October 1992, while taping an Exotic Club Tour in Minneapolis Jackson approached sister Janet Jackson, also in town recording her fifth studio album with Jimmy Jam and Terry Lewis, to ask for help in escaping Gordon. Janet struck La Toya, accusing her elder sister of recording their conversation.

In 1993 in their New York home, Gordon beat Jackson repeatedly with a heavy brass dining room chair, leaving Jackson with black eyes, swollen lip and chin "the size of a clenched fist", cuts requiring 12 mouth stitches and contusions on her face, arms, legs and back. Jackson lost consciousness during the beating, leading Gordon to believe she was dead. She recalled, "He called his friends and said, 'She's dead. I killed her,' because I was lying in a puddle of blood and I was out." Gordon was arrested but then released, claiming he beat Jackson in self-defense. In December 1993, Gordon hastily arranged a press conference in Tel Aviv, where he had Jackson read a statement claiming to believe the sex abuse allegation against her younger brother Michael might be true. This was an abrupt reversal of her previous defense of Michael against the charges. Gordon claimed La Toya had proof that she was prepared to disclose for a fee of $500,000. A bidding war between US and UK tabloids began, but fell through when they realized that her revelations were not what she had claimed them to be. According to La Toya, Gordon threatened to have siblings Michael and Janet killed if she did not follow his orders. In 1993, Jackson claimed her father sexually abused her and her sister as children while her mother Katherine enabled it. Rebbie called the police on her father over the sexual abuse, and Katherine told the police nothing happened.

Under Gordon's management, Jackson's career declined with his booking of disreputable jobs such as spokesperson for the Psychic Friends Network. By the mid-1990s, Jackson's finances were in disarray and she was forced to file for bankruptcy in order to stave off claims of $550,000 in damages to the Moulin Rouge for ending her contract early. In 1993 Jackson held a concert at Poland's Sopot International Song Festival and released a step aerobics exercise video, Step-Up Workout. In 1994, Jackson again worked for Playboy Entertainment, becoming one of the first celebrities to have a Celebrity Centerfold video. Playboy Celebrity Centerfold: La Toya Jackson was released in the first quarter of 1994 and sold roughly 50,000 copies. She later said that the video was filmed under duress by Gordon. Jackson later released two albums, one of country music, From Nashville to You, and another of Motown hits, Stop in the Name of Love, in the mid-1990s.

When Jackson became aware that Gordon was planning to feature her in a pornographic film, Jackson phoned brother Randy who flew to New York to help her escape while Gordon was out. Days later, La Toya filed for divorce in Las Vegas and sued Gordon in civil court for years of abuse under the Violence Against Women Act. The divorce decree changed her name from La Toya Jackson Gordon to La Toya Jackson, thus dropping use of her former middle name Yvonne. La Toya Jackson ended her estrangement with the entire Jackson family and returned home to Hayvenhurst. Jackson forgave her parents for her stifled upbringing, reasoning, "I've come to realize that as we get older, we grow and learn a lot more. And I think that my father and my mother, they raised children the best way they know how." According to La Toya, Michael knew that she was forced to attack him in the press against her will and he did not blame her. Jackson's last single of the 1990s was "Don't Break My Heart".

After separating from Gordon, Jackson cloistered herself in her home and lived alone for the first time. Weary after her years of public scorn, she was afraid to perform again and struggled to rebuild her confidence. After this time she started to perform in Europe and South America occasionally to start making money to pay off the huge debts which Gordon had accumulated in her name while they were married. In the wake of the September 11 attacks Jackson was moved to compose "Free the World". She performed the song for friends to a positive reception and began working on further material.

=== 2003–2011: Return to music and Starting Over ===
Jackson publicly re-emerged on Larry King Live on March 9, 2003. Her appearance caused CNN's phone lines to stay busy for hours and was King's highest-rated show in three years. Jackson announced her first musical project in six years, Startin' Over. Startin' Over's lead single was 2004's "Just Wanna Dance", released independently through Ja-Tail Records. The song was released under her pseudonymous nickname "Toy" in order to avoid any prejudices DJs might hold against La Toya Jackson's name. "Just Wanna Dance" reached number 13 on the US Billboard Hot Dance chart. "Free the World" was released the following year. In February 2005, Ja-Tail Records secured a deal with Bungalo Records to distribute the project, but it was delayed for several years.

After Jack Gordon's death in 2005, Jackson was free to speak more openly about the control he had exerted over her life. She sent a security expert to eyewitness that Gordon had not faked his death a second time. In 2005 she appeared on ABC News to recant her previous allegations and defend brother Michael against new charges of child abuse.

"I Don't Play That"
A sample from "I Don't Play That", a single by La Toya Jackson.

On January 10, 2007, the reality TV show Armed & Famous premiered on CBS starring Jackson and other celebrities. The program documented Jackson's basic training and service as a reserve police officer with the Muncie Police Department. The show was eventually removed from the CBS lineup, due to its inability to compete with American Idol. VH1 subsequently aired the remaining episodes. She released the promotional single "I Don't Play That" on January 29, 2007.

In January 2009, Jackson was paid £103,000 to appear as a contestant on the British television program Celebrity Big Brother 6, which she placed 7th. Jackson released "Home" on July 28, 2009, with all proceeds going to AIDS Project Los Angeles. In 2010, Jackson launched the hand cream "Dream Cream" with German cosmetics firm Alessandro International.

Jackson's second memoir, Starting Over, was released in the United States on June 21, 2011, through Gallery Books, an imprint of Simon & Schuster. Following numerous delays, Jackson's intended eleventh studio album was instead released as an EP, also called Starting Over, on the same day. In 2011, Jackson appeared in NBC's The Celebrity Apprentice 4. Jackson also served as a guest judge on RuPaul's Drag Race and on the 17th season of America's Next Top Model.

=== 2012–present: Reality television ===
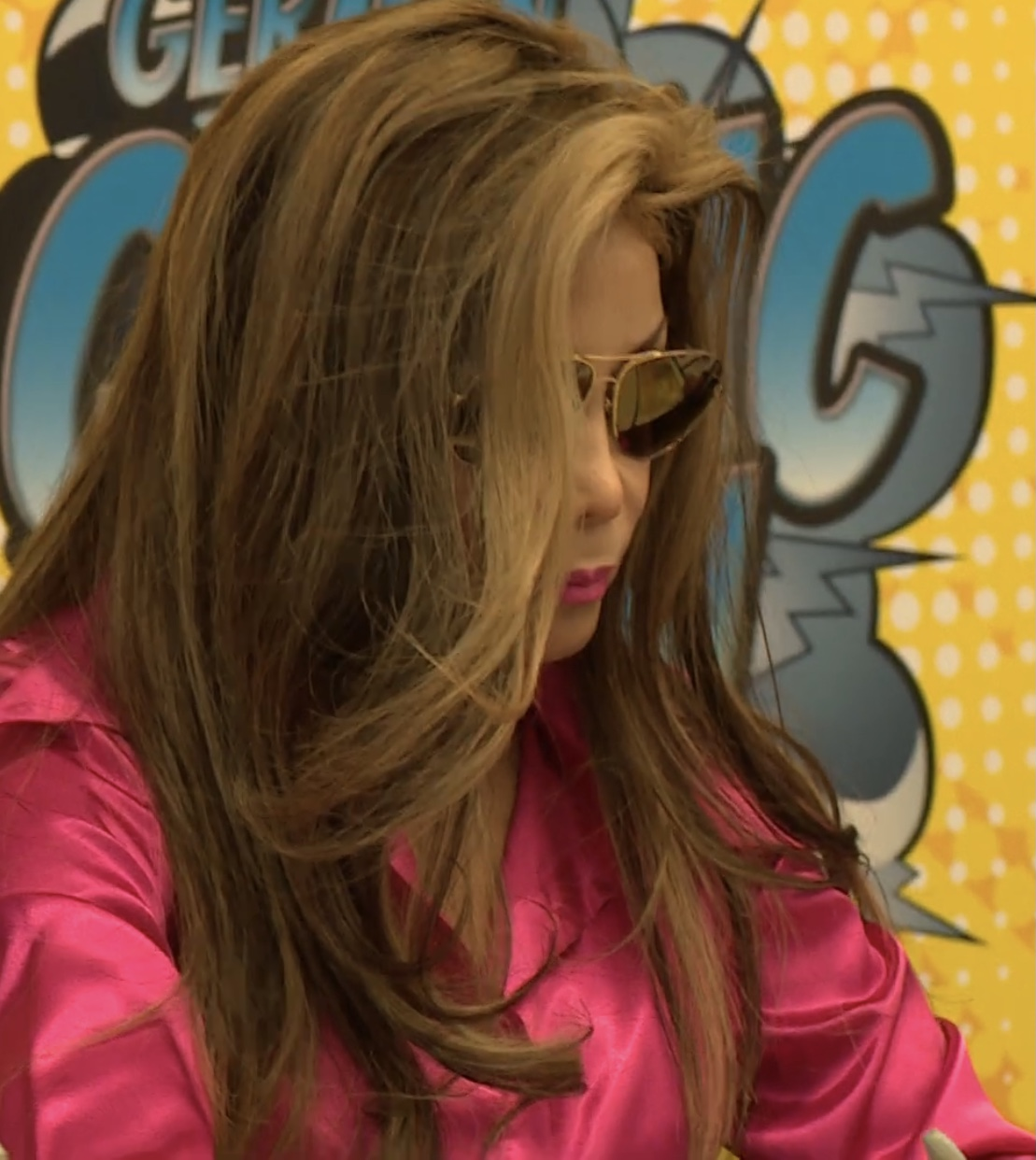
Jackson in 2018

In 2013, Jackson started her own reality series called Life with La Toya on the Oprah Winfrey Network. Also in 2013, Jackson rejoined the newest cast for The All-Star Celebrity Apprentice, lasting until the 3rd episode of the season. During the series, Jackson accused fellow contestant Omarosa Manigault of causing the death of her fiancé Michael Clarke Duncan. Manigault threatened a lawsuit in response.

In September 2013, Jackson made her stage debut in a week-long engagement in the off-Broadway musical Newsical. In 2013, she and business partner Jeffre Phillips were executive producers of the documentary Dancing in Jaffa, which followed 150 young Jewish and Palestinian Israelis as they dance together in unity by putting their cultural differences aside.

In 2016, she collaborated with Iranian-Armenian pop star Andy on the single "Tehran", sung in Farsi.

In 2018, Jackson participated in a celebrity edition of Food Network's Worst Cooks in America. Coached by celebrity chef Tyler Florence, she advanced to the final and beat out Ian Ziering to win the season; $25,000 was awarded to the charity Race to Erase MS in Jackson's name.

In 2019, Jackson was revealed to be "Alien" on the FOX reality series The Masked Singer during its first season. In 2021, Jackson competed as the Menina (Girl) in the Spanish edition Mask Singer: Adivina Quién Canta. In 2023, she appeared for a third time in the franchise, as Burger Gal in the 5th season of the Australian edition of The Masked Singer. Jackson returned to the Drag Race franchise in 2026 as a guest judge on the eleventh season of All Stars, complete with a runway theme inspired by her classic looks.

== Vocal style and influences ==
La Toya Jackson has a three-octave vocal range reaching up to E♭_{6} in her single, "Bet'cha Gonna Need My Lovin'". The Evening Independent says that she has an "attractive, pleasant voice that is matured and controlled." Andrew Hamilton of AllMusic describes her voice as a light, wispy "sexy whisper". Like her siblings, Michael and Janet, she is mainly a pop, R&B, and dance music performer but she has also dabbled in rock as heard in her song, "No More Drama" and reggae in her signature song "Heart Don't Lie", as well as country music.

Like many other Jacksons, most notably Michael, she cites James Brown as a "major influence". When Jackson headlined the Moulin Rouge she paid homage to La Goulue and cited Josephine Baker as an influence. L'Express hailed Jackson as "the new Josephine Baker." According to academic Bennetta Jules-Rosette, "Through careful planning, she was able to model a successful part of her career abroad on the master tropes of a Baker-like image. Jackson exemplifies Baudrillard's notion that neither the message nor the content count as much as the referentiality of the signifier in postmodern performative discourse."

== Personal life ==
Jackson is reportedly vegetarian as of October 2023.

=== Relationship and marriage to Jack Gordon ===
Jackson and Jack Gordon were married on September 5, 1989, in Reno, Nevada. According to Jackson's autobiography, the marriage was both unplanned and against her will. She later stated in an interview that Gordon tricked her into the marriage by brainwashing her into believing that her family was going to attempt to kidnap and kill her. What started as a business relationship soon turned into an abusive partnership; Gordon was arrested twice for second-degree assault against Jackson. Jackson also filed a gender-based lawsuit against Gordon before filing for divorce.

In March 1995, Gordon attempted to force Jackson to dance at the Reading, Pennsylvania strip club, Al's Diamond Cabaret. After refusing to do so, she was booed and heckled by the angry crowd of 300 people, who had paid $20 to see her strip. When the pair returned to their home, Jackson was beaten.

On May 2, 1996, Gordon would once again beat Jackson after she refused to perform at a European concert. Jackson filed for divorce on May 10, 1996, in Clark County District Court in Las Vegas, Nevada, after obtaining a temporary order of protection from Gordon. The following month, Jackson filed a $20 million lawsuit against Gordon, citing abuse and subsequently accusing Gordon of violating the 1994 Violence Against Women Act. In the lawsuit, Jackson cited beatings caused by her refusal to perform topless at shows in Pennsylvania, Ohio, and Europe, and two separate incidents where in which Gordon hit her with a Coca-Cola bottle and a chair. The divorce was granted on June 24, 1997.

==== Gordon v. Gordon ====
On March 3, 1998, an order was entered by District Judge Carl J. Christensen at Clark County, Nevada, dissolving the marriage and awarding Jackson royalties, property, and a large sum of money.

As a part of the original petition, it was requested that Gordon submit financial documents and all records of any property he owned. He exercised his right to not incriminate himself and refused to submit the documents to the court. His attorney admitted to this, and also admitted that Gordon had sold properties that he and Jackson mutually owned without Jackson's permission, despite the fact that the court had previously ordered that he not sell any of these properties until further instruction.

From the final divorce decree, Gordon was ordered to return all of Jackson's fur coats, photographs, videos, and furnishings. He was also ordered to forgo his rights to any of Jackson's contracts that she signed during the marriage, including those with Sony Music Entertainment, BMG Music, Playboy Entertainment, and Penguin/Dutton Books. Jackson was awarded full ownership of the Las Vegas apartment where the couple resided during their marriage. As part of the final judgment, Jackson's maiden name was restored; the document specifically states that her name was changed from La Toya Jackson Gordon to La Toya Jackson, thus eliminating her former middle name of Yvonne as a part of her legal name.

The judge also ordered that Gordon was strictly forbidden from utilizing the likeness of Jackson in any newspaper, magazine, tabloid, or promotional media, and that any violation of this order would result in severe sanctions. The order concludes with a response to Jackson's petition for a restraining order against Gordon; it was ordered by the court that Gordon and Jackson were both strictly prohibited from going within 100 feet of each other, each other's work place or residence, or any member of each other's family. Gordon was ordered to provide Jackson with a $350,000 settlement and pay $15,000 to cover Jackson's attorney fees. Jackson later stated in her autobiography "Starting Over" that Gordon did not pay her the $350,000 settlement she was awarded.

=== Relationship with Jeffré Phillips ===
In early December 2013, Us Weekly and others reported that Jackson had married her business partner Jeffré Phillips in Los Angeles on December 6, 2013. Entertainment media outlet TMZ reported that La Toya and Jeffre stated that they have not married, which they reaffirmed in an appearance on Oprah: Where Are They Now?. The confusion appeared to result from Phillips proposing to Jackson publicly in a recently aired episode of Jackson's reality series Life with La Toya. Phillips' decision to propose to La Toya purportedly was prompted by their friend Brenda Harvey Richie, who had noted that they had been best friends for 15 years, after Phillips became La Toya's business partner; Phillips' proposal was made with the blessing of La Toya's father. As of February 2015, Jackson and Phillips had annulled their engagement.

== Discography ==
- La Toya Jackson (1980)
- My Special Love (1981)
- Heart Don't Lie (1984)
- Imagination (1986)
- La Toya (1988)
- Bad Girl (1990)
- No Relations (1991)
- Formidable (1992)
- From Nashville to You (1994)
- Stop in the Name of Love (1995)

== Filmography ==
=== Film ===
Year	Title	Role	Notes
2026	Michael		Executive producer

=== Television ===
Year	Title	Role	Notes
1976–1977	The Jacksons	Herself	Main cast
1985	The Fall Guy	Herself	Episode: "Rockabye Baby"
1992	Counterstrike	Sandrine Carter	Episode: "Skin Deep"
1998	MADtv	Herself	Episode: "La Toya Jackson"
2000	E! True Hollywood Story	Herself	Episode: "La Toya Jackson"
2003	The Anna Nicole Show	Herself	Episode: "Derby Daze/Kentucky Derby"
2005	Airport	Herself	Episode: "Fire and Emergency"
2007	Armed & Famous	Herself	Main Cast
2009	Celebrity Big Brother	Herself	Main cast: Season 6
2009	The View	Herself	Co-host: Episodes #13.7, #13.9
2009	Peter Andre: My Life	Herself	Episode: #1.6
2011; 2013	RuPaul's Drag Race	Herself	Guest judge; Season 3, 2 Episodes; Season 5, Episode: "Can I Get an Amen?"
2011	The Celebrity Apprentice 4	Herself	Fired episode 8
2012	90210	Marilyn	Episode: "Blood is Thicker than Mud"
2013	All-Star Celebrity Apprentice	Herself	Fired episode 3
2013–2014	Life with La Toya	Herself	Primary cast
2018	Worst Cooks in America	Herself	Season 13 winner
2018	The Last Sharknado: It's About Time	Cleopatra	Television film
2019	Queen of Drags	Herself	Guest judge
2019	The Masked Singer	Alien/Herself	7th unmasked
2021	Mask Singer: Adivina quién canta	Menina/Herself	1st unmasked
2023	The Masked Singer Australia	Burger Gal/Herself	7th unmasked
2026	RuPaul's Drag Race All Stars	Herself	Guest judge; Season 11, Episode: "Break Dancin' 2: Electric Rugaloo"

== Awards and other achievements ==
Year	Award	Category	Nominated work	Result	Ref.
1980	Cashbox Awards	Top New Female Vocalist – Pop	La Toya Jackson	3rd place	
1980	Cashbox Awards	Top New Female Vocalist – Black Contemporary	La Toya Jackson	3rd place	
1981	Billboard Music Awards	Top Female Artist	La Toya Jackson	46th place	
1985	World Popular Song Festival	Outstanding Song Award	"Baby Sister"	Won	

- Jackson received a US Congressional Tribute for her participation in a "Beat It" rally and Stay In School Campaign
