= Armed & Famous =

- Starring: Erik Estrada; La Toya Jackson; Jack Osbourne; Trish Stratus; Wee Man
- Country of origin: United States
- Original language: English
- No. of episodes: 6

Production
- Executive producer: Tom Forman
- Running time: 43-45 minutes
- Production company: Tom Forman Productions

Original release
- Network: CBS
- Release: January 10 – January 24, 2007

Armed & Famous is an American reality television series that premiered January 10, 2007, on CBS. First-run episodes were also aired on VH1 in the United States. After the first episode aired, CBS moved the show into a time slot opposite American Idol on Fox. After four episodes, the show was pulled from the network on January 26, 2007, with broadcast rights for the series shifted to VH1. All six episodes of the series aired on VH1, including two previously unaired episodes from the original CBS run. The series was executive produced by Tom Forman.

== Premise ==
The series follows five celebrities as they train to become reserve police officers for the Muncie Police Department in Muncie, Indiana, followed by graduation. After that, the celebrities will go on patrol with the same training officers who traditionally ride with new officers.

The series starred actor Erik Estrada, singer La Toya Jackson, TV personality Jack Osbourne (son of Ozzy Osbourne), pro wrestler Trish Stratus, and stuntman Jason Acuña (a.k.a. "Wee Man" on Jackass). The series was narrated by Jeff Davis.

On December 5, 2006, the celebrities were sworn in as reserve officers.

== Reaction ==
The premiere episode attracted an estimated 8.2 million viewers, generating a 2.9 rating, while the second episode's estimate tops off at 7.8 million viewers, which generated a rating of 2.7.

On January 26, 2007, several websites reported Armed & Famous had been pulled from the CBS schedule. On January 30, 2007, it was revealed that Armed & Famous' would debut on VH1 on Saturday February 3 at 5pm/4pm Central Time with a marathon of the first four episodes along with a brand new episode at 9pm/8pm central. However, the marathon was later rescheduled to air on Saturday February 10, without the new episode. It is unknown if the last three originally announced episodes were ever produced and even exist outside of raw footage. At the time of its acquisition of the series, VH1 confirmed that episodes 6 and 7 had not been completed and no time frame was given for their completion. Also, no comment was made about the apparent disappearance of episode 5. In a "Where are they now" type article in the January 27, 2008 Muncie Star Press about the show, CBS spokeswoman Kelli Raftery confirmed that the network has no intention of airing the last three unaired episodes.

== Lawsuit ==
Lyndsay Clements, 22, filed a lawsuit in March 2007 claiming that her home was wrongfully entered as she was questioned about people she did not know. She claims the search was illegal and excessive, and violated her constitutional rights. Footage appeared on January 11 on the show included scenes showing police outside Clements's apartment, police rushing in, and then someone in handcuffs. Clements acknowledged that La Toya Jackson and Jack Osbourne were involved.
