= Stop in the Name of Love (album) =

Studio album by La Toya Jackson
- Released: 1995
- Recorded: 1995
- Genre: Pop; dance
- Length: 47:25
- Label: CMC
- Producer: Peter Holm

La Toya Jackson chronology
From Nashville to You (1994)	Stop in the Name of Love (1995)	Starting Over (2011)

Dance Collection cover

Singles from Stop in the Name of Love
- 1. "I Can't Help Myself" Released: April 25, 1995

Professional ratings
Review scores
Source	Rating
AllMusic	1.5/5 stars

Stop in the Name of Love is the ninth studio album by American singer La Toya Jackson. The album, which was recorded and mixed in Sweden, is a collection of Motown covers in a dance style, including The Supremes' "Stop! In the Name of Love" and "Baby Love", the Four Tops' "I Can't Help Myself", and The Jackson 5's "I'll Be There". The entire album was recorded in one hour.

The album's original cover featured an uncensored topless photo of Jackson from her Playboy shoot, although the album was re-issued with the photo cropped. The album was also later re-issued under the title Dance Collection. The album was digitally released in 2009 as The Motown Songbook. Only one single was released from the album: "I Can't Help Myself". It was made in Austria and only released in Germany.

== Track listing ==
=== Stop in the Name of Love ===
Released in 1995 under CMC Records.

1. "Tracks of My Tears" (Smokey Robinson, Marvin Taplin, Warren Moore) – 4:00
2. "Two Lovers" (Robinson) – 3:51
3. "I Can't Help Myself" (Holland–Dozier–Holland) – 4:09
4. "Baby I Need Your Loving" (Holland–Dozier–Holland) – 4:23
5. "Stop in the Name of Love" (The Remix) (Holland–Dozier–Holland) – 6:09
6. "Baby Love" (Holland–Dozier–Holland) – 3:20
7. "Someday We'll Be Together" (Johnny Bristol, Jackey Beavers, Harvey Fuqua) – 3:19
8. "My Guy" (Robinson) – 3:01
9. "Love Child" (Henry Cosby, Deke Richards, Pam Sawyer, Frank Wilson, R. Dean Taylor) – 3:06
10. "Tears of a Clown" (Stevie Wonder, Cosby, Robinson) – 3:08
11. "Stop in the Name of Love" (album version) (Holland–Dozier–Holland) – 3:53
12. "I'll Be There" (Berry Gordy, Jr., Bob West, Willie Hutch, Hal Davis) – 4:40

=== Dance Collection ===
Released in 1995 under CMC Records.

1. "Stop in the Name of Love" (The Remix) – 6:09
2. "Baby Love" – 3:20
3. "Baby I Need Your Loving" – 4:23
4. "I Can't Help Myself" – 4:09
5. "Two Lovers" – 3:51
6. "Someday We'll Be Together" – 3:19
7. "My Guy" – 3:01
8. "Tracks of My Tears" – 4:00
9. "Love Child" – 3:06
10. "Stop in the Name of Love" (album version) – 3:53
11. "I'll Be There" – 4:40
12. "Tears of a Clown" – 3:08
