= Jack Gordon (entertainment manager) =

American businessman, entertainment and manager

Jack Leon Gordon
- Gordon in 1998
- Born: Jack Leon Gordon; November 10, 1939; Springfield, Illinois, U.S.
- Died: April 19, 2005 (aged 65); Scottsdale, Arizona, U.S.
- Resting place: Palm Valley View Cemetery, Las Vegas, Nevada
- Other names: Samuel Isaac Gordon (1981–83); Clifford William Johnson (1983)
- Occupations: Entertainment manager; businessman
- Years active: 1970–2005
- Spouses: Ethel L. Moxley (m. 1961; div. 1972) La Toya Jackson (m. 1989; div. 1997)
- Children: 2

Jack Leon Gordon (November 10, 1939 – April 19, 2005), who also went by the names Samuel Isaac Gordon and Clifford William Johnson, was an American businessman and entertainment manager. Jack Gordon was most well-known for being the manager and husband of American singer–songwriter La Toya Jackson. Gordon also served as the manager of American tabloid subject, later turned porn actor, John Wayne Bobbitt, of John and Lorena Bobbitt. Jack Gordon died of cancer on April 19, 2005, aged 65.

== Life and career ==
=== Early life and criminal activity ===
Jack Leon Gordon was reputedly born in Springfield, Illinois to Abraham Gordon, a Jewish Russian immigrant, and Faye Stein, an Illinois native of Jewish heritage. While some sources cite Gordon's birthplace as Springfield, Illinois, he claimed Las Vegas was his birthplace when he changed his name in 1981 to Samuel Isaac Gordon. However, in 1983, when he changed his name again, this time to Clifford William Johnson, he said that he was born in Springfield.

In the 1970s, Gordon ran arcades at the Circus Circus casino in Las Vegas, Nevada. He later bought controlling interest in a Los Angeles, California massage parlor called Circus Maximus in West Hollywood. Gordon subsequently bought two additional massage parlors, one in Signal Hill and the other in Costa Mesa, California. In 1984, a conviction for soliciting sex in Los Angeles resulted in a sentence of three months probation for Jack Gordon.

=== Attempted bribe of Harry Reid ===
In 1978, Gordon offered a $12,000 bribe to then-chairman of the Nevada Gaming Commission Harry Reid to approve two new, carnival-like gaming devices (Flip-A-Winna and the coin pusher game Penny Falls) for casino use. Gordon believed the games would bring him more than $100 million in profits. Reid notified the FBI and allowed agents to videotape a meeting with Gordon in his office. At the point where Reid asked, "Is this the money?", FBI agents burst in to arrest Gordon. Reid, a former boxer, exclaimed "You son of a bitch, you tried to bribe me!" and attempted to strangle Gordon, before startled agents pulled him off. Gordon was convicted in federal court in 1979 and sentenced to six months in prison. In 1981, Reid's wife found a car bomb attached to one of their vehicles, a bomb Reid suspected was placed by Gordon.

=== Management and coerced marriage to La Toya Jackson ===
In the mid-1980s, Gordon began to manage La Toya Jackson along with her father Joseph, but he took over her management completely during the late 1980s. He married her in Reno, Nevada, on September 5, 1989, claiming that it was for her own protection against kidnapping by the Jackson family. La Toya Jackson stated that this was both unplanned and against her wishes. La Toya said: "I told him, 'No way, Jack! I can't marry you. You know what marriage means to me. I've never been in love; I don't even date.... It's not right. I don't love you. I don't have feelings for you.'" Jackson stated that she tried to run out of the chapel three times but bodyguard Antonio Rossi grabbed her, saying, "There's some things you have to do. Even if you don't want to." Jackson told Ebony magazine the marriage was "strictly in name only. It has never been consummated." Six months into the marriage, Jackson asked Gordon for an annulment in Italy. In response, she claims that Gordon repeatedly bashed her head against the side of a table, saying that he would never let her go. Paparazzi subsequently photographed Jackson with black eyes, which Gordon claimed was caused by intruders. From this point forward, Jackson lost all contact with her family and wrote her autobiography La Toya: Growing Up in the Jackson Family, which accused her father of child abuse.

Gordon sometimes hired bodyguards to watch La Toya and she claimed that he would never allow her to speak to or see her family. La Toya's father Joseph stated in his book The Jacksons that he believed Gordon brainwashed her and made her scared of her own family. Jackson's mother Katherine also agreed that La Toya had been brainwashed while Gordon claimed that Katherine had tried to kill La Toya. Her sister Janet concurred with her parents saying at the time, "I think this guy who is with her has brainwashed her and made her like this... He keeps her away from the family, and now he's brainwashed her so much she keeps herself away from us." In 1993, in their New York home, Gordon allegedly beat La Toya repeatedly with a heavy brass dining room chair, leaving Jackson with bruises on her face, arms, legs and back in addition to a black eye, lip and chin swollen to "the size of a clenched fist", requiring 12 stitches in her mouth. Jackson told reporters, "he kicked me in the mouth (and) the boot went right up under my lip . . . all the way through the skin and burst my lip." Jackson said she lost consciousness during the beating, leading Gordon to believe she was dead. She recalled: "He called his friends and said, 'She's dead. I killed her,' because I was lying in a puddle of blood and I was out." Gordon was arrested but then released, claiming self-defense after La Toya "came at" him with a knife. He then declared to the press that he was undergoing radiation treatments for cancer.

In December 1993, Gordon hastily arranged a press conference in Tel Aviv where he had Jackson read a statement that she believed sex abuse allegations against her younger brother Michael were true. She stated, "I cannot and will not be a silent collaborator in his crimes against young children... Forget about the superstar, forget about the icon. If he was any other 35-year-old man who was sleeping with little boys, you wouldn't like this guy." Gordon claimed La Toya had proof that she was prepared to disclose for a fee of $500,000. A bidding war between US and UK tabloids began, but fell through when they realized that her revelations were not what she had claimed them to be. According to La Toya, Gordon threatened to have siblings Michael and Janet killed if she did not follow his orders. Under Gordon's management, Jackson's career declined, as he booked her disreputable jobs such as spokesperson for the Psychic Friends Network. Due to Gordon's steady stream of publicity stunts Jackson had become a hate figure of sorts. In 1996, Gordon attempted to force Jackson to dance at a Reading, Pennsylvania strip club. She refused to do so and in return, was booed and heckled by the predominantly male crowd. When Jackson became aware that Gordon was planning to feature her in a pornographic film, she decided that she had had enough. Jackson phoned her brother Randy, who flew to New York City to help her escape while Gordon was out. Days later, La Toya filed for divorce.

==== Accusations about the Jackson family ====
While La Toya was in seclusion for four years, Gordon continued to make accusations about the Jackson family. He claimed that La Toya's younger brother Michael had performed monkey sacrifice rituals, abused Bubbles the chimpanzee, and even accused him of forcing Lisa Marie Presley to marry him. In 2002, Gordon did interviews advertising his tell-all book of the Jackson family titled The Jackson Family: The True Story of the Most Powerful Family in the Music Industry. The entire family, including his former wife, stated that his allegations were "pure fantasy".

=== Mafia associations ===
FBI wiretaps in 1994 linked Gordon to Genovese crime family member James "Little Jimmy" Ida. Gordon was taped arranging for mobsters to shadow Jackson on a trip to Russia. Gordon paid the group $1,500 a month for at least two years to protect La Toya from "shakedowns" by rival mobsters. Gordon also employed the services of organized crime defense attorney and former Las Vegas mayor Oscar Goodman.

=== Other entertainment clients ===
Jack Gordon had few other entertainment clients apart from La Toya Jackson. Before Gordon became La Toya's co-manager with her father in the late 1980s (and eventually manager) it was widely known he had a disreputable past including a criminal record. Joseph Jackson was always afraid of Gordon as he believed Gordon was probably armed. Gordon's clients included John Wayne Bobbitt, Divine Brown, Gloria Gaynor, Shannen Doherty, and Sharon Stone. In 1999, Gordon claimed that Paula Jones, a pivotal figure in the impeachment trial of Bill Clinton, had confided in him that Clinton had not sexually harassed her as she originally claimed. Gordon arranged Jones' nude spread in Penthouse, and claimed he helped her launch a psychic hotline. However, in a March, 1999 CNN Politics website article, Susan Carpenter McMillan, a confidante and former adviser to Jones, issued a statement from Jones that she had not, nor would she ever do anything with a psychic hotline. McMillan also has stated that Gordon was "obsessed" with the former Arkansas state employee, phoning her up to 15 times a day.

== Death ==
Gordon died on April 19, 2005, at Mayo Hospital in Scottsdale, Arizona after having been sick with cancer for several months. He was 65 years old.
