= Nick Mundy =

- Genres: R&b, pop, soul, funk, soft rock, country
- Occupations: Musician, composer, producer
- Instruments: Vocals, guitar, keyboards
- Years active: 1970s to present
- Labels: Warner Bros, Columbia, Double Cross Records
- Formerly of: The Beck Family

Nick Mundy is an American singer, composer, guitarist and producer from Philadelphia. He was the lead singer of The Beck Family who had a hit in 1979 with the disco funk hit "Can't Shake the Feeling". He had a national hit with "Ain't It All Right" in 1984. He also co-wrote and produced the song "Talk to Me" for Chico DeBarge which was a hit in 1986. He has composed and produced hits for various artists and has worked with Gina Go-Go, Franne Golde and Paul Fox. His compositions have been used in mainstream films.

== Background ==
Along with his cousins, Tyrone, Menelick, Tony, and Joanna Beck, he and another cousin Donny Wilson became The Beck Family. He was the lead singer for the group. In 1979, they had success with "Can't Shake the Feeling" which got to no. 43 on the Billboard Hot Soul Singles chart, no. 37 on the Cash Box Top 100 Black Contemporary singles chart, no. 47 on the Record World Black Oriented Singles chart, and no. 137 on the Record World Singles 101 - 150 chart. It also made it to no. 25 on the RPM Weekly Disco Playlist chart.

In the 1980s, when Sister Sledge took their world tour, Mundy was the musical director. In the 1990s, he was in a musical partnership with Gina Gomez aka Gina Go-Go.

As a composer or producer, has also worked with Eric Benet, Color Me Badd, Sheena Easton, Gina Go Go Gomez, Janice Ian, La Toya Jackson, Jeremy Jordan, Kashif, Motion & Tony Terry, Judy Mowatt, Jeffrey Osborne, Alexander O’Neill, John Pagano, Phil Perry, Carl Thomas, and Wild Orchid & Fergie.

His music has been used in the films, The Taking of Beverly Hills (1991), Class Act (1992) and Airborne (1993).

Mundy has also recorded Country music.

== Career ==
=== Solo ===
In 1981, his single, "Jam with Us" backed with the instrumental version was released on the Double Cross label.

His single, "Ain't It All Right" entered the Billboard Hot Black Singles chart at no. 89 on December 22, peaking at no. 89 and staying in the chart until Jan 19, 1985.

His album Your Kinda Guy was released on Warner Brothers in Spring, 1988. Also that year, his single, "Trade Him In" was released on Warner Bros.

In 2008, Mundy's Just Songs album was released on CD containing thirteen tracks. It was reviewed by Howard Dukes of Soul Tracks. Making note of Mundy's vocal range which went from a husky tenor to a falsetto, Dukes called him an interesting singer. He said that the album started off slow "but rewards listeners to stick around with some good jazz influenced R&B". The songs included "Is it the Way", "Adorable", "Oh, What A Day", and "Happy in My Own Space".

Around 2018, Mundy recorded some Country influenced songs, "Oh What a Day", "B Free Performed Live Inside My Head", "Im Not Coming Home Tonight", "I like My Coffee in the Country" and "Yodalhootenanny".

In April 2023, he released the single, "Show Me A Sign".

=== Composer, producer ===
With Cerrone and Donnell Spencer, Mundy co-wrote the 1986 hit, "Oops, Oh No!" that was recorded by Cerrone and La Toya Jackson. It made no. 89 on the R&B chart.

Along with Franne Golde and Paul Fox, he co-wrote "Talk to Me" for Chico DeBarge. He also played guitar and some of the drums on the song as well Synthesizer and providing backing vocals. "Talk to Me" peaked at no. 21 on the sales section and no. 20 in the airplay of the Billboard Hot 100 Sales & Airplay chart on the week ending February 21, 1987.

He co-wrote and produced the single, "I Can't Face the Fact" for Gina Go-Go. The single got to no. 77 on the Cash Box Top 100 singles chart in 1989. Also that year, Kashif had his single "Personality" released. It was composed by Mundy and "Gina Go Go" Gomez. Mundy also co-produced and co-arranged it with Kashif. Cash Box noted in the December 9 issue that it was at the top of the charts at no. 11, having reached no. 6 the week before. It actually had been holding the number 6 position for three weeks.

With Antonina Armato and Gina Go-Go, he co-wrote "What Comes Naturally" for Sheena Easton. He also co-produced the single with Denny Diante. It turned out to be a hit for Easton. It got to no. 19 on the Billboard chart.

He produced the single, "Let's Get to It" for John Pagano. The single was released on MCA MCA5P-2258 in 1992. It spent seven weeks in the Billboard R&B chart, peaking at no. 64.

He wrote "Try My Love" which was recorded by Jeremy Jordan in 1993. It was used in the 1993 film, Airborne which was directed by Rob Bowman and starred Shane McDermott, Seth Green, and Brittney Powell.

With Maria Christina, Mundy co-wrote the sing "Grind" which was a hit for Alexander O'Neal, getting to no. 83 in 1998.

== See also ==
- Category:Song recordings produced by Nick Mundy (musician)
- Category:Songs written by Nick Mundy (musician)
