= Try My Love =

Try My Love may refer to:

- Try My Love (Jeremy Jordan album), 1993
  - "Try My Love" (song), the title song
- Try My Love (Táta Vega album), 1978
- "Try My Love", a song by Stephanie Mills from Sweet Sensation, 1980
- "Try My Love", a song by Shauna Davis
