= Dancing on the Ceiling (disambiguation) =

"Dancing on the Ceiling" is a 1986 album by American singer Lionel Richie.

Dancing on the Ceiling may also refer to:

== Songs ==
- "Dancing on the Ceiling" (1930 song), by Richard Rodgers, with lyrics by Lorenz Hart
- "Dancing on the Ceiling" (Lionel Richie song), 1986
- "Dancing on the Ceiling", by Jules LeBlanc and the cast of Chicken Girls, 2018
- "Dancing on the Ceiling", by Soul Seekerz, 2010

== Other uses ==
- Dancing on the Ceiling, a 2010 episode of the TV series Gummibär & Friends: The Gummy Bear Show, episode 20, season 2

== See also ==
- Dancing On the Ceiling: Stanley Donen and His Movies, a 1996 book by Stephen M. Silverman
- Dancin' on the Ceiling, a 1979 album by the Beck Family
  - "Dancin' on the Ceiling", its title track
