= My Love Is Good Enough =

Single by Jeremy Jordan

from the album Try My Love
- Released: May 12, 1994
- Genre: Pop
- Length: 4:56
- Label: Giant Records
- Songwriters: Robbie Nevil, Steve Dubin

Jeremy Jordan singles chronology
| "Try My Love" (1993) | "My Love Is Good Enough" (1994) |

"My Love Is Good Enough" is a song by American singer Jeremy Jordan, featured as the second track and fourth single release of his debut album Try My Love (1993). Written by Robbie Nevil and Steve Dubin and produced by Nevil, the track contrasts the album's romantic ballads with energetic grooves.

The song was included in the soundtrack of the 1993 comedy-drama film Airborne. Critics highlighted Jordan's performance and the track's catchy jack/funk-influenced beat, noting its appeal to both pop and rhythm audiences.

Although the song received positive reviews from publications such as Billboard and Hitmakers, it did not enter any music charts and became the final single released in Jordan's career.

== Overview ==
"My Love Is Good Enough" is the second track on Jeremy Jordan's debut album, Try My Love, following the "Interlude", an intro featuring a snippet of the title track. The song was written by Robbie Nevil and Steve Dubin, and produced by Nevil. According to the Chicago Sun-Times, it showcases energetic Bobby Brown–style grooves that contrast with the album's romantic ballads inspired by Boyz II Men and Color Me Badd.

The song was included in the soundtrack of Rob Bowman's 1993 comedy-drama film Airborne, which received mixed reviews from major publications. Critics and fans have noted that Jeremy Jordan's contribution, which also includes the song "Try My Love", helps reinforce the film's nostalgic and youthful atmosphere, that resonates with audiences familiar with 1990s pop culture.

== Critical reception ==
Larry Flick of Billboard praises the song as Jeremy Jordan's "strongest single to date", highlighting his ability to exude considerable sex appeal while maintaining his teen idol image. The track is noted for its "credible jack/funk beat", that effectively complements the song's "cute pop/soul personality".

Hitmakers magazine published reviews in two different issues, in the Street Sheet "Hitmakers Mix Show Disc-Overy Club" section. On June 10, 1994, it was praised as proof that the singer should not be dismissed as merely a "teen idol" or "heartthrob". The publication urged listeners to focus on the music itself, describing it as "damn good". In the May 27, 1994 issue, Matt "The Bran" Bradley from Power Pig in Tampa highlighted the song's "smooth groove" perfectly suited for radio. He also suggested that for a more hip-hop-oriented sound, listeners check out the "M. Doc & Jere MC Street Mix" version.

== Commercial reception ==
The single was highlighted in the May 20, 1994 issue of Hitmakers magazine, featured in the "Frank's Place" column under "Hot Tips". The mention signaled industry confidence in the track as a potential chart contender and a recommended pick for radio airplay. The song did not chart and was Jordan's last single.

According to the singer, while recording his second album, the Giant label was facing serious problems and eventually went bankrupt, and his agent at ICM steered his career from singing toward acting. Jordan went on to appear in around 20 films, including Never Been Kissed. In 1999, he recorded the song "A Girl Named Happiness" for the film's soundtrack and filmed a music video, but the track was never released as a single.

== Track listing ==
My Love Is Good Enough – 12" single – Side A
| No. | Title | Writer(s) | Length |
|---|---|---|---|
| 1. | "My Love Is Good Enough (InDaSoul Extended Mix)" | Robbie Nevil, Steve Dubin | 5:33 |
| 2. | "My Love Is Good Enough (M. Doc & Jere MC Extended Street Mix)" | Robbie Nevil, Steve Dubin | 5:52 |
| 3. | "My Love Is Good Enough (Jamie's Extended House Mix)" | Robbie Nevil, Steve Dubin | 7:37 |

My Love Is Good Enough – 12" single – Side B
| No. | Title | Writer(s) | Length |
|---|---|---|---|
| 4. | "My Love Is Good Enough (InDaSoul Extended Instrumental)" | Robbie Nevil, Steve Dubin | 4:59 |
| 5. | "My Love Is Good Enough (Jamie's Drums)" | Robbie Nevil, Steve Dubin | 3:53 |
| 6. | "My Love Is Good Enough (Jamie's Instrumental)" | Robbie Nevil, Steve Dubin | 7:35 |

== Personnel ==
Credits adapted form My Love Is Good Enough LP.

- Co-producer – Steve Dubin
- Design – Gregory R. Gilmer
- Edited by Jere MC (tracks: A1, A2, B1)
- Engineer [Remix] – Raven Soul (tracks: A3, B2, B3)
- Executive producer – Cassandra Mills
- Management – Peter Schivarelli
- Mastered by Chris Gehringer
- Photography by William Hames
- Producer – Robbie Nevil
- Additional producers – InDaSoul (tracks: A1, A2, B1), Jamie Principle (tracks: A3, B2, B3), Raven Soul (tracks: A3, B2, B3)
