= Benton Jennings =

American actor, writer, and director

- Benton Jennings
- Born: El Paso, Texas, US
- Education: London Academy of Music and Dramatic Art
- Occupations: Film, television, stage actor; stage director; writer
- Spouse: Liz (1986–present)
- Website: http://www.bentonjennings.com

Benton Jennings (born October 27, 1955) is an American film, television, commercial, voice-over, and stage actor, writer and director based in Los Angeles, California.

== Career ==
He attended Texas Christian University (TCU) in Fort Worth, Texas, with a BFA in theatre arts, London Academy of Music and Dramatic Art (LAMDA), and The Film Actors Lab in Dallas, Texas, studying under Adam Roarke and Spencer Milligan.

Jennings has performed in over 60 film and television roles, and over 100 stage productions nationally, in the UK and Europe. He also performed in over 6000 performances with the nationally touring and award-winning sketch comedy troupe "The Gunfighters", which he co-founded in 1975.

Jennings has won 27 Best Actor awards from film festivals for his performance as 'Rabbi' in the independent film The Annunciation, including The New York Best Actor Awards, Best Shorts Competition, Accolade Global Film Competition, Depth of Field International Film Festival, LA Indies Awards, Toronto Independent Film Festival, San Francisco Indie Short Festival, Indiefest Film Awards, Hollywood International Golden Age Festival, and Berlin International Art Festival.

He has the dubious distinction of having portrayed Adolf Hitler five times: once on the TV soap Passions, David Zucker's 2008 comedy film An American Carol, the indie comedy feature Poolboy: Drowning Out the Fury with Kevin Sorbo, on Jimmy Kimmel Live! in the "Captain Mexico" parody sketch, ep 9.163, July 26, 2011, and February 2012 in a professional photo essay which depicts a time-traveling, assassin-shooting Hitler.

In 2009, he became a series regular in the hit comedy web series Safety Geeks: SVI, playing the role of Hopkins, a droll English butler. The series also stars Brittney Powell, Dave Beeler, Tom Konkle, and Mary Cseh. The series is a multiple award winner, including "Best Film or TV Comedy" at the 1st International 3D Awards in Los Angeles.

In 2012 Jennings became a series regular on the award-winning comedy web series School And Board, playing school board president (and frozen yogurt tycoon) Mike Donovan. The series won "Outstanding Achievement - Ensemble Cast in a Comedy or Mockumentary Series" at the LA Web Fest.

Jennings was recently a member of the critically acclaimed SkyPilot Theatre Company in Los Angeles. While appearing in a production of Requiem for a Heavyweight by Rod Serling as the Doctor, having already received critical praise for the part ("...an excellent BENTON JENNINGS..." - Amy Bowker, The Tolucan Times), he stepped into the lead role of Maish when actor Ken Butler became terminally ill, with only 4 days rehearsal to learn over 70 pages of dialog, and received standing ovations for his performances.

He is the youngest son of William Bryan Jennings, who played the cop in the 1966 cult film favorite Manos: The Hands of Fate.

He is the founder of the living history organization 93rd Sutherland Highland Regiment of Foot Living History Unit, organized in 1989.

== Filmography ==
=== Television ===
- All American Cowboy (1985) – Gunfighter
- Dallas: The Early Years (1986) – Oil Man
- City Guys (2000) – Tony
- Charmed (2000) – Concerned Citizen
- The Frontier: Decisive Battles (2000) – Colonel Robert Dale
- The Last Dance (TV movie) (2000) – Mr. Macvey
- Profiler (2000) – Lance Persky
- Power Rangers Lightspeed Rescue (2000) – Mister Mesmer
- Family Law (2000) – Commissioner Ronald Kluft
- The Drew Carey Show (2001) – Bill
- Arli$$ (2001) – Dean Chance
- Strong Medicine (2001) – Worthington
- Passions (2002) – Adolf Hitler
- Mary Christmas (TV movie) (2002) – Dan Charles
- A.U.S.A. (2003) – Jury Foreman
- I'm With Her (2003) – Man
- JAG (2003) – Bailiff
- VH-1 Big in '04 (2004) – Bennington, Brigitte Nielson & Flava Flav's English Butler
- It's Always Sunny in Philadelphia (2005) – Pro-Lifer
- Without a Trace (2006) – NA Man
- Dexter (2006) – Gene Marshall
- 12 Miles of Bad Road (2007) – Fred
- The Call (Pilot) (2007) – Pilgrim
- Jimmy Kimmel Live! (2004 – ) – Various sketch roles
- Nick Cannon Presents: Short Circuitz (2007) – Priest in HypeMan
- Heartland (2007) – Robert Grayson
- Scrubs (2007) – Mr. Hobbs
- Big Love (2010) – Dave
- Elevator Girl Hallmark Channel TV movie (2010) – Doug
- Greek (2011) – Professor
- The League (2010) – Brassy Judge
- How I Met Your Mother (2010) – Jordan
- The Event – (2011) NSA Supervisor
- Safety Geeks:SVI (2009) – Hopkins (Series Regular)
- School and Board (2012) – Mike Donovan (Series Regular)
- Vegas (2012) – Moderator
- Incredible Crew – Krumping High School Principal (a.k.a. Krumping H.S. Principal) (December 31, 2012 and February 7 and April 4, 2013)
- General Hospital – Swiss Doctor (2013)
- American Horror Story: Hotel – Butler Graves (2015)
- Documentary Now! - Mr. Runner Up: My Life as an Oscar Bridesmaid – Rich Snooty Man (2016)
- Dr. Ken – Middle Age Patient (2017)
- Shameless – Father Henry (2018)
- For All Mankind – Judge (2019)
- Our Flag Means Death – Anglican Priest (2021)
- I Think You Should Leave – Berl (2022)
- Palm Royale – Theodore Thimble, III (TBA)

=== Film ===
- Alamo: The Price of Freedom (1988) – Gordon C. Jennings
- Legacy: A Mormon Journey (1990) – Governor Boggs
- Macon County War (1990) – Nathan Jackson (Lead)
- Highway to Hell (1990) – Toby Gilmore (Lead)
- Travis (1991) – Col. William Barrett Travis (Lead)
- Steele's Law (1991) – Agent West
- The Last of the Mohicans (1992) – Scottish Officer
- Shoo Fly (2001) – Doctor Bum the Messenger of the Gods (Lead)
- Sisyphus Rocks (2001) – Herman Perkins (Lead)
- Winning London (2001) – Chef (British hotel)
- Pollinator (2002) – Doctor Rappaccini
- Temptation (2003) – Boris, the Butler
- I-See-You.Com (2006) – HR Executive
- Mr. & Mrs. Smith (2005) – Maitre'd
- How Henri Came to Stay (2006) – Mr. Darly (Lead)
- San Saba (2008) – Arthur "Chip" Miller
- Poolboy: Drowning Out the Fury (2010) – Adolf Hitler
- San Francisco 2177 (2010) – Hoffman
- An American Carol (2008) – Adolf Hitler
- In Her Shoes (2005) – Shoe Salesman (John Johnson)
- Trouble Is My Business (2018) – Wilson Montemar
- The Annunciation (2018) – Rabbi (Lead)
- The Wedding Year (2019) – The Waiter
