= Someone to Hold =

1992 single by Trey Lorenz

Single by Trey Lorenz

from the album Trey Lorenz
- B-side: "Find a Way"; "Wanna Girl"
- Released: September 1, 1992
- Studio: Record Plant (Sausalito); Right Track (New York City); Record Plant (Los Angeles)
- Genre: Pop; R&B
- Length: 4:42 (album); 4:21 (single)
- Label: Epic
- Songwriters: Trey Lorenz; Mariah Carey; Walter Afanasieff
- Producers: Walter Afanasieff; Mariah Carey

Trey Lorenz singles chronology
"I'll Be There" (1992)	"Someone to Hold" (1992)	"Photograph of Mary" (1992)

Music video
- "Someone to Hold" on YouTube

"Someone to Hold" is a song co-written and performed by American contemporary R&B singer Trey Lorenz. It was also written and produced by Mariah Carey and Walter Afanasieff. It is the opening track from his eponymous debut album and also was issued as the album's first single on September 1, 1992 by Epic Records. The song was his only hit on the Billboard Hot 100 as a solo artist, peaking at #19 in 1992.

European releases of the song were backed with "Wanna Girl," Lorenz' original version of a song which became an international hit in 1993 for Jeremy Jordan.

== Background and release ==
Epic Records promoted "Someone to Hold" as the lead single from Trey Lorenz. It released it in the United States on September 1, 1992, and in the United Kingdom on November 9, 1992. The label issued 7-inch vinyls, cassettes, and CDs in both countries. A mini CD followed in Japan on November 21, 1992. The single has the album track "Find a Way" as a B-side and certain releases also include "Wanna Girl". To promote "Someone to Hold", Lorenz starred in a music video directed by Michael Borofsky. He appeared on the American late-night television program The Arsenio Hall Show, sang on It's Showtime at the Apollo, and performed on the British television series Friday Night with Wogan.

== Music and lyrics ==
Situated in pop and R&B music, "Someone to Hold" is a slow jam with a synth-laden production. In the lyrics, a narrator expresses joy in finding the woman that is his soulmate. Critics considered the composition "soothing" and "sensitive" and described Lorenz's vocal delivery as "smooth" and "soulful".

== Personnel ==
Credits adapted from the liner notes of Trey Lorenz

Recording

- Recorded at The Plant Recording Studios (Sausalito, California), Right Track Recording Studios (New York City), The Record Plant (Los Angeles)
- Mixed at The Plant Recording Studios (Sausalito, California)
- Mastered at Masterdisk (New York)

Personnel

- Trey Lorenz – songwriter, lead vocals
- Mariah Carey – songwriter, producer, arranger, vocal arranger, background vocals
- Walter Afanasieff – songwriter, producer, arranger, keyboards, Synclavier programming, acoustic guitar
- Dan Shea – additional producer, keyboards, synth bass, rhythm programming
- Dana Jon Chappelle – engineering, mixing
- Manny LaCarrubba – additional engineering
- Katherine Miller – vocal engineering
- Jim Caruana – second engineering
- Thom Kadley – second engineering
- David Gleeson – second engineering
- Gary Cirimelli – Akai programming, Macintosh programming, Synclavier programming
- Ren Klyce – additional programming
- Michael Landau – guitars
- Cindy Mizelle – background vocals
- Audrey Wheeler – background vocals
- Will Downing – background vocals
- Bob Ludwig – mastering

== Charts ==
1992–1993 weekly chart performance
Chart (Publisher)	Peak position
Australia (ARIA)	177
Canada Retail Singles (The Record)	14
Canada Contemporary Hit Radio (The Record)	11
Canada Hit Tracks (RPM)	29
Europe Dance Radio (Music & Media)	21
Europe Hit Radio (Music & Media)	35
Netherlands Tipparade (Stichting Nederlandse Top 40)	3
Netherlands Single Top 100 (Dutch Charts)	47
New Zealand Singles (RIANZ)	11
Norway Airplay (Music & Media)	4
UK Singles (CIN)	65
UK Airplay (ERA)	30
US Hot 100 Singles (Billboard)	19
US Hot Adult Contemporary (Billboard)	18
US Hot R&B Singles (Billboard)	5
US Top 40/Mainstream (Billboard)	21
US Top 40/Rhythm-Crossover (Billboard)	21
US Top 100 Pop Singles (Cash Box)	13
US Top 100 R&B Singles (Cash Box)	21
US Adult Contemporary (Gavin Report)	18
US Top 40 (Gavin Report)	10
US Top 40/Urban Crossover (Gavin Report)	4
US Urban Contemporary (Gavin Report)	5
US Adult Contemporary (Radio & Records)	15
US Contemporary Hit Radio (Radio & Records)	6
US Urban Contemporary (Radio & Records)	3

1992 year-end chart performance
Chart (Publisher)	Position
US Hot R&B Singles (Billboard)	70
US Adult Contemporary (Gavin Report)	93
US Urban Contemporary (Gavin Report)	55
US Adult Contemporary (Radio & Records)	89
US Contemporary Hit Radio (Radio & Records)	69
US Urban Contemporary (Radio & Records)	47
