= Shane McDermott (actor) =

American actor

- Born: Middletown, New York, USA
- Years active: 1990–1996
- Known for: Actor

Shane Francis McDermott (born April 24, 1976) is an American former actor, artist, and real estate broker. He is best known for portraying Mitchell Goosen in the 1993 sports comedy-drama film Airborne. He also appeared as Garrett Booth in the television series Swans Crossing and as Scott Chandler on the ABC daytime soap opera All My Children.

== Career ==
McDermott was born on April 24, 1976, in Middletown, New York. He was raised in Houston, Texas, and began working as a model in New York City during his youth. Having relocated to Roosevelt Island at age 12. McDermott worked as a Ford model before beginning his acting career. McDermott's first love however was gymnastics. While on a week long hiatus from class after a minor disagreement with his coach, McDermott saw a commercial for Faces International and promptly called the phone number. Though he didn't sign with the agency the experience gave him the headshot that obtained him a Ford Modeling Agency contract. his first major booking was a campaign for IZOD. Subsequent modeling work included, Ralph Lauren and Patagonia campaigns. Before leaving gymnastics behind for good McDermott placed 15th in the National Junior Olympics. Shane McDermott began appearing in television commercials as a teenager. His first comercial opportunity was for Ethan Allen Furniture, he later appeared in another national spot for Stovetop Stuffing just before he was cast as Garrett Booth in Swans Crossing. His early acting credits included an appearance in The Baby-Sitters Club in 1990. In 1992, he was cast as Garrett Booth in the syndicated teen soap opera Swans Crossing, appearing opposite Sarah Michelle Gellar. His performance earned him a nomination for a Youth in Film Award. An avid Rollerblader in the early 90s, using his skates to navigate the city to get to auditions in a serendipitous twist of fate, in 1993, McDermott received his best-known film role as Mitchell Goosen in Airborne, directed by Rob Bowman. The film follows a California teenager who moves to Cincinnati and becomes involved in competitive rollerblading. McDermott starred alongside Seth Green, Brittney Powell and Jack Black. The role subsequently became his signature performance and has continued to attract a cult following. Before the films official release McDermott and Airborne co-star Seth Green signed up for and "snuck" into a test screening for the film while in disguise as not to be seen by producers. This was McDermott's first time seeing the film and himself on the big screen. McDermott later portrayed Scott Chandler on the ABC daytime soap opera All My Children from 1995 to 1996. He also appeared in episodes of Loving and Law & Order. After leaving acting, McDermott pursued interests in art. He studied art and subsequently moved to Los Angeles, he then continued moving further south to San Diego where he discovered his love for painting, primarily using artistic mediums, acrylic stain on canvas, oil on canvas and woodgrain painting on canvas. In 2003, he relocated to Galveston, Texas, where he developed a career as an artist and real estate professional. According to McDermott "Galveston is the combination of all the places he has lived and loved."

=== Personal life ===
McDermott has two children. He continues to live and work in Texas, where his activities include art and real estate. Shane McDermott became involved in restoring historic properties in Galveston and eventually established a real estate business. After hurricane Ike swept through Galveston Island leaving excessive damage in its wake, McDermott founded a maintenance company to help with rebuilding efforts. He has also continued to work as a painter and artist.

== Filmography ==
Year	Title	Role	Notes
1990	The Baby-Sitters Club	Jamie Anderson	
1992	Swans Crossing	Garrett Booth	
1993	Airborne	Mitchell Goosen	
1994	Loving	Kirk	TV Series
1995	Law & Order	Kyle Winters	
1996	All My Children	Scott Chandler	TV Soap Opera
