= The Beck Family =

American disco band for the 1970s

- Genres: Disco, R&B
- Years active: 1970s
- Labels: Art, LeJoint, London
- Spinoff of: The Beck Brothers
- Past members: Anthony Beck; Joanna Beck; Menelick Beck aka Mendy Beck; Tyrone Beck; Nick Mundy aka Nick Mundi; Donald Wilson

The Beck Family was a musical family group from Philadelphia. With their music in the disco-funk genre, they had success with their hit single, "Can't Shake the Feeling" which charted nationally in 1979, the peak of the disco era. It registered in the Cash Box, Billboard and Record World charts. It also made the disco chart in Canada. They released an album which made the Billboard Soul LPs chart. They also had another single released during that time.

== Background ==
The group was made up of three Beck Brothers, Anthony Beck, Mendy Beck, Tyrone Beck, their sister Joanna Beck and their cousins, Nick Mundy and Donald Wilson.

The origins of the group can be traced back to a gospel group in 1966. The group was called The Beck Brothers. They were doing the rounds with their parents, father Elder Charles Beck who was a minister and leader of the ensemble. Their mother Bertha beck was the pianist. According to music-trade magazine, Cash Box, the grandmother of the Beck Children was Anna Shepherd, a prominent gospel singer.

Following the death of Charles Beck, older Brother Tony Beck decided that they should move towards the mainstream. Cousins Donny Wilson and Nick Mundi then joined the group. At that time Joanna was still a gospel singer and a solo act. Menelick aka Mendy had gone into the military service for a period of time. Joanna Joined the group and after Mendy's service was up. He later re-joined the group.

It was while the group was performing at different venues on the R&B circuit in New York, New Jersey, and Philadelphia that they came into contact with Ron Mosley of the newly formed Le Joint record label.

== Career ==
The group recorded some tracks at Quad Studios in Pennsauken, New Jersey. The song "Dancing", backed with "I Don't Know What You're Coming To" was released on Art TBWH 7771 in 1976. It was composed by T. Beck and N. Mundy. Beck also handled the arrangements.

By September 1978, The Beck Family had been signed to the LeJoint label. They had signed with the label shortly after Zulema did.

It was noted in the February 10 issue of Billboard that The Beck Family were getting ready for the first release on the LeJoint label. The intended release was to be called The Beck Family.

On the 28th of February, an event organized by Billboard, the Disco Forum included an event in a New York club with Frankie Crocker as the host. It was for the MCA and LeJoint record labels. Artists intending to perform were Van McCoy, Chuck Brown and Zulema. The Beck Family were also expected to appear.

In 1979, the ages of the three brothers were, Tyrone, 18; Menelick, (aka Mendy) 26; and Tony, 27. Sister Joanna was 24. Cousin Donny Wilson was 20, and cousin Nick Mundi was 21.

=== Album ===
When the album was released, it was called Dancin' on the Ceiling. It was reviewed in the March 17 issue of Billboard. The review was positive. The reviewer's picks were, "Can't Shake the Feeling", Dancin' on the Ceiling" and "Falling in Love Again". With pop crossover potential, the expectations were that it would get r&b and disco airplay. Their album was also reviewed in the March 24, 1979 issue of Cash Box. The review said that the T. Life produced album had potential for chart action and airplay in the R&B, disco and pop formats.

The album was released in the UK on London SHE 8534. It was reviewed in the June 23 issue of Music Week. To the reviewer it was somewhere between pop and r&b. The reviewer also said that it was light and infectious and could pick up airplay. The reviewer also said that the Beck Family appearing in the UK would stimulate interest.

The album entered the Billboard Soul LPs chart at no. 72 on the week of May 12, and held that position for another week.

One of the backing singers on the album was Phyllis Hyman.

=== Hit single ===
"Can't Shake the Feeling" was a Record World Single Pick for the week ending March 17. The reviewer noted the radio potential, calling it a strong debut. On March 24, it made its debut in the Cash Box, Top 100 Black Contemporary singles chart. Their record was also getting played on George White's show at WGPR-FM in Detroit, James Jordan's show at WYBC in New Haven and Joe Tamburro's show at WDAS in Philadelphia.

It had been doing well with airplay. For the week of March 30, Radio & Records recorded its activity in the East where it was in the "Hottest" on WXYV. It was also added to the WILD and WWIN playlists. In the South it was added to two others, incl. WTMP. In the West it was added to the KYAC playlist.

The single made its debut at no. 79 on the Billboard Hot Soul Singles Chart for the week ending April 7. It also made its debut that week in the Record World Black Oriented Singles chart at no. 71.

In Canada the single was getting airplay and on the week of April 14, RPM Weekly recorded it at no. 25 on the Disco Playlist. It was being played on Gerry O'Day's show at CFMQ-FM in Regina. For the week of April 27, Radio & Records reported that it was added to the playlists of WVKO in the Midwest and KDAY in the West.

With the success of the single in the US, Decca Records in England had an interest in it. Michael McDonaugh of Decca said that they were on the lookout for new disco product and were excited by what the Beck Family were doing in the US. It was released on a 12" format in the UK. In his review of the single, Paul Sexton of Record Mirror said that it had a great boogie and good party feeling. He also said that it generated more feeling than any other disco record that week. The 7" version was issued in the UK on London HLE 10569. The 12" version was released on LHLE 10569.

On May 12 at week six, it peaked at #47 on the Record World Black Oriented Singles chart. On May 19, at week nine, "Can't Shake The Feeling" got to no. 37 on the Cash Box, Top 100 Black Contemporary singles chart. It held that position for another week. It spent a total of twelve weeks in the chart. Also on the week of May 19, on its seventh week, it peaked at no. 43 on the Billboard Hot Soul Singles Chart.

On the week of June 30, the 12" version was bubbling under the UK Disco Top 90.

=== Further activities ===
The group appeared with other performers, Shalamar, Cindy and Roy, Grace Jones, and Blondie on The Soap Factory show that was televised on March 17, 1979.

The March 31 issue of Cash Box had a recent-then picture of artists at a club. Pictured Joanna Beck, Tony Beck, and Nick Mundy with Van McCoy, Keith Barrow, Lamarr Rene, WBLS radio personality and Billy Smith the national disco promotion manager for London in New York during the National Disco Convention.

The group were the subject of an article and an interview in the June 5, 1979 issue of Blues & Soul.

The single, "Falling in Love Again" was released on LeJoint 5N34005. It was a recommended soul single in Billboards Top Single Picks for August 4, 1979.

On December 11, 1979, "Dancin' on the Ceiling" was getting played on Canale 5, on the Musica leggera in stereofonia program in Italy. On December 14, "Can't Shake the Feeling" was being played on the same program.

== Members ==
Members of the group included:

- Anthony Beck
- Mendy Beck
- Tyrone Beck
- Joanna Beck
- Nick Mundy (Lead singer
- Donald Wilson

== Discography ==
Singles
| Release | Catalogue | Year | Notes |
|---|---|---|---|
| "Dancing" / "I Don't Know What You're Coming To" | Art TBWH 7771 | 1976 | |
| "Can't Shake the Feeling" / "Nobody But You" | LeJoint 5N-34003 | 1979 | |
| "Falling In Love Again" / "Can You Feel It" | LeJoint 5N-34005 | 1979 | |

Album
| Release | Catalogue | Year | Notes |
|---|---|---|---|
| Dancin' on the Ceiling | LeJoint LEJ 17001 | 1979 | |

== Later years ==
Nick Mundy who sang lead with the group would go on to have a chart hit with "Ain't It All Right" in 1984. It entered the chart at no. 89 on December 22, peaking at no. 89 and staying in the chart until Jan 19, 1985. He also worked with Sheena Easton and Sister Sledge etc.

| Publication | Release date | Article title | Page | Link |
|---|---|---|---|---|
| Record World | September 16, 1978 | London R&B Taps Custom Label Talent | 44 | Link |
| Cash Box | April 5, 1979 | NEW FACES TO WATCH | 10 | Link |
| Blues & Soul Rock's Back Pages | June 5, 1979 | The Beck Family; Profile and Interview by John Abbey | | (No direct link |
| rareandobscuremusic | May 4, 2019 | The Beck Family | | Link |
