= Do the Right Thing (disambiguation) =

Do the Right Thing is a 1989 American comedy-drama film produced, written, and directed by Spike Lee.

Do the Right Thing may also refer to:

- "Do the Right Thing" (song), song by Redhead Kingpin and the F.B.I.
- Do the Right Thing (podcast), comedy panel show podcast hosted by Danielle Ward
- "Do the Right Thing" (Private Practice), episode of the TV series Private Practice
