= Wannagirl =

1992 song

"Wanna Girl"

Song by Trey Lorenz
- A-side: "Someone to Hold"
- Released: August 1992
- Label: Epic

Trey Lorenz singles chronology
"Wanna Girl" (1992)	"Photograph of Mary" (1993)

"Wannagirl" is a song originally recorded by Trey Lorenz. Also known as "Wanna Girl". Lorenz' rendition had been released in 1992 as a B-side on the European versions of his single, "Someone to Hold."

== Jeremy Jordan cover ==
"Wannagirl"

Single by Jeremy Jordan

from the album Try My Love
- A-side: "The Right Kind of Love"
- Released: 24 April 1993
- Genre: Dance-pop
- Length: 3:59
- Label: Giant Records
- Songwriters: Keith Thomas, Tony Haynes
- Producer: Keith Thomas

Jeremy Jordan singles chronology
"The Right Kind of Love" (1992)	"Wannagirl" (1993)	"Try My Love" (1993)

Music video
- "Wannagirl" on YouTube

"Wannagirl" was covered by Jeremy Jordan and released in the spring of 1993. It was the follow-up single from his debut album Try My Love on Giant Records. It was co-written by Keith Thomas, who produced both versions. Background harmonies were retained from the original recording, but vocals were added by Audrey Wheeler, Chris Rodriguez, Cindy Mizelle and Emanuel Officer as well as some from Lorenz. Both versions are almost identical from a production standpoint, but the newer version features an extra breakdown and a different vocal arrangement starting at the 3:15 mark.

A music video was released to promote the song. It received play on MTV, ranking at number 44 on the channel's most-played videos listing for the week ending May 9, 1993. In Japan, the single was released as a double A-side single with "The Right Kind of Love".

Billboard described "Wannagirl" as a "slick and chirpy jack/pop workout", noting that Jordan continued his pursuit of pop and teen-idol stardom with the release. The review praised the singer as a "thoroughly engaging vocalist", while suggesting that he deserved "a more substantial, less gimmicky song". Despite this, Billboard concluded that the track had strong potential for success among youth-oriented audiences. In a review for the Gavin Report, Dave Sholin highlighted "Wannagirl" as another strong Top 40 contender for Jeremy Jordan. He praised the song as a well-produced, uptempo dance-pop track, and added that Jordan's appeal went beyond his looks, emphasizing his solid potential as a pop artist.

Commercially, the single became an international hit, peaking in the US at #28 on the Billboard Hot 100 and #25 on Cash Box.

== Track listing ==
US maxi-single

1. Wannagirl (Preferredgirl Mix) 3:59
2. Wannagirl (Streetgirl Mix) 6:06
3. Wannagirl (Streetgirl Instrumental) 5:29
4. Wannagirl (A Cappella Mix) 4:31
5. Wannagirl (Album Mix) 4:30

Japan mini single

1. Wannagirl (Preferredgirl Mix) 3:59
2. The Right Kind of Love (Main Mix) 4:30

== Charts ==
Weekly charts for "Wannagirl"
Chart (1993)	Peak position
Australia (ARIA)	22
Canada Top Singles (RPM)	42
US Billboard Hot 100	28
US Pop Airplay (Billboard)	11
US Rhythmic Airplay (Billboard)	24
US Cash Box Top 100	25
