= Jessica Boevers =

American actress

- Occupations: Stage, film, teacher, television actress

Jessica Boevers is an American actress who has appeared in a number of Broadway productions, off-Broadway productions, films, and television.

== Early life ==
Boevers attended the University of Cincinnati College-Conservatory of Music, graduating in 1994.

== Career ==
Boevers' Broadway credits include Les Misérables (Eponine), A Funny Thing Happened on the Way to the Forum (Philia) Rent (Maureen), Oklahoma! (Ado Annie), and In My Life (Jenny).

In addition, she has appeared on the television shows Strangers with Candy and Another World, and the 1993 film Airborne.

Boevers works at the University of Michigan as an assistant professor of musical theatre in Ann Arbor, Michigan.
