= Trey Lorenz (album) =

Studio album by Trey Lorenz
- Released: September 29, 1992
- Recorded: 1991–1992
- Genre: R&B; soul
- Length: 50:36
- Label: Epic
- Producer: Walter Afanasieff; Glen Ballard; Mariah Carey; Mark Morales; Mark C. Rooney; Keith Thomas; BeBe Winans

Trey Lorenz chronology
Trey Lorenz (1992)	Mr. Mista (2006)

Trey Lorenz is the debut solo album by American R&B singer-songwriter Trey Lorenz. It was released by Epic Records in 1992, and features eleven tracks, eight of which Lorenz co-wrote.

The album features three singles: "Someone to Hold", which peaked at number 19 on the US Billboard Hot 100 and number five on Billboard's Hot R&B/Hip-Hop Songs chart, "Photograph of Mary" peaked at number 46 on the R&B chart and number 11 on the Dance Club Songs chart, while the third and final single, the Lionel Richie-penned "Just to Be Close to You" reached number 66 on the R&B chart.

== Critical reception ==
Professional ratings
Review scores
Source	Rating
AllMusic	3/5 stars
The Boston Phoenix	2.5/4 stars
Entertainment Weekly	A−
Los Angeles Times	2.5/4 stars
Northants Herald & Post	3/5
The Post and Courier	2/4 stars

Critics considered the album's musical direction derivative. In the Northants Herald & Post, John Marrs felt Lorenz "never really ventures off onto an experimental path". Hartford Courant critic Dana Tofig said the songs are largely indistinguishable from those by other R&B singers; Michael Freedberg of The Boston Phoenix specified Lillo Thomas, Keith Washington, and Alexander O'Neal as artists Lorenz "seems to kiss the beat with". Given his perceived musical similarities with her, J. D. Considine of The Baltimore Sun suggested the album is suited as a Christmas gift for Mariah Carey fans. Greg Forman, a reviewer for The Post and Courier, said Lorenz emulated Carey to bad effect.

Reviews complimented Lorenz for demonstrating vocal range and control on the album. (Note: Such as reviews by David Sinclair of The Times, Stewart Walker of The Blade, and Jerome Cannon of the Chattanooga News-Free Press) Billboard described Trey Lorenz as a "fitting showcase for his vocal prowess". Interview writer Peter Galvin compared his voice favorably to those of singers Barry White, Philip Bailey, and Stevie Wonder. Peter Kinghorn described Lorenz as "wonderfully emotive" in the Evening Chronicle. Entertainment Weekly's Amy Linden considered Lorenz a capable lead singer and Sheila Rayam of the Democrat and Chronicle predicted "he should be around long after his superstar mentor has left his side."

== Track listing ==
Trey Lorenz
No.	Title	Writer(s)	Producer(s)	Length
1.	"Someone to Hold"	Trey Lorenz; Mariah Carey; Walter Afanasieff	Afanasieff; Carey; Dan Shea^{A}	4:42
2.	"Photograph of Mary"	Seth Swirsky	Afanasieff; Carey	4:26
3.	"Just to Be Close to You"	Lionel Richie	Carey; Randy Jackson^{A}	4:45
4.	"Run Back to Me"	Lorenz; Scott Cutler; Brian O'Doherty	Keith Thomas	4:21
5.	"Always in Love"	Lorenz; Carey; Afanasieff	Carey; Afanasieff	5:14
6.	"Wipe All My Tears Away"	Lorenz; Mark C. Rooney; Mark Morales	Rooney; Morales	4:46
7.	"Baby I'm in Heaven"	Lorenz; Thomas	Thomas	4:51
8.	"It Only Hurts When It's Love"	Lorenz; Glen Ballard	Afanasieff; Carey	4:14
9.	"How Can I Say Goodbye"	Lorenz; Cutler; O'Doherty	Afanasieff; Carey	4:14
10.	"Find a Way"	Lorenz; Ballard	Ballard	3:49
11.	"When Troubles Come"	BeBe Winans	Winans	5:14
Total length:				50:36

== Personnel ==
Musicians

- Trey Lorenz – lead vocals, background vocals (2–7, 9, 10), background vocals arranger (4, 7), handclaps (10)
- Walter Afanasieff – arranger (1, 2, 5, 8, 9), keyboards (1, 2, 5, 8, 9), Synclavier programming (1), acoustic guitar (1), synth bass (2, 5, 8, 9), rhythm programming (2, 5, 8, 9), Hammond B3 (3, 9)
- Mariah Carey – arranger (1, 2, 5, 8, 9), vocal arranger (1), background vocals (1–3, 5, 9)
- Dan Shea – keyboards (1), synth bass (1), rhythm programming (1), additional keyboards (2, 5, 9), additional programming (2, 5, 9)
- Gary Cirimelli – Akai programming (1), Macintosh programing (1, 2, 5, 8, 9), Synclavier programming (1, 2, 5, 8, 9)
- Ren Klyce – additional programming (1), Akai programming (2, 5, 8, 9), Synclavier programming (2, 5, 8, 9), keyboard programming (3)
- Michael Landau – guitars (1, 2, 5, 8, 9)
- Cindy Mizelle – background vocals (1, 4, 7, 10), background vocals arranger (7), handclaps (10)
- Audrey Wheeler – background vocals (1, 4, 5, 7, 10), background vocals arranger (7), handclaps (10)
- Will Downing – background vocals (1, 9, 10), handclaps (10)
- Mark C. Rooney – background vocals (2, 6), keyboards (6)
- Patrique McMillan – background vocals (2, 5)
- Karen Anderson – background vocals (2)
- Jeff Bova – keyboard programming (3), arranger (3)
- Randy Jackson – synth arranger (3), drum arranger (3), additional synth bass (3)
- Bobby Wooten – Moog lead synth (3)
- Scott Cutler – background vocals arranger (4)
- Brian O'Doherty – background vocals arranger (4)
- Keith Thomas – arranger (4, 7), keyboards (4, 7), bass (4, 7), drum programming (4, 7), background vocals arranger (7)
- Michael Morris – horns arranger (4)
- Jerry McPherson – guitars (4, 7)
- Barry Green – trombone (4)
- Mark Douthit – alto saxophone (4), baritone saxophone (4)
- Mike Haynes – trumpet (4)
- Cheree Price – background vocals (5)
- Kelly Price – background vocals (5)
- Deborah Cooper – background vocals (5)
- Mark Morales – drum programming (6)
- Ginger Collins – background vocals (6)
- Glen Ballard – rhythm arranger (10), keyboards (10), programming (10)
- Jerry Hey – horns arranger (10), trumpet (10)
- Randy Kerber – Hammond organ (10)
- Dan Higgins – saxophone (10)
- The Soul Sisters – additional handclaps (10)
- Cedric Caldwell – arranger (11), keyboards (11)
- Ron Huff – strings arranger (11)
- Marc Harris – additional keyboards (11)
- Tom Hemby – guitar (11)
- Victor Caldwell – bass (11)
- Steve Brewster – drums (11)
- Kelly O'Neal – saxophone (11)
- Kari Gorodetsky – Nashville String Machine (11)

Production

- Walter Afanasieff – producer (1, 2, 5, 8, 9)
- Mariah Carey – producer (1–3, 5, 8, 9)
- Dan Shea – additional producer (1)
- Randy Jackson – additional producer (3)
- Keith Thomas – producer (4, 7)
- Todd Moore – production coordinator (4, 7)
- Mark C. Rooney – producer (6)
- Mark Morales – producer (6)
- Glen Ballard – producer (10)
- Jolie Levine – production coordinator (10)
- BeBe Winans – producer (11)
- Louis Upkins Jr. – production assistant (11)
- Carol Chen – art direction
- Eva Mueller – photography
- Jeffrey Tay – stylist

Technical

- Dana Jon Chappelle – engineering (1–3, 5, 8, 9), mixing (1–3, 5, 8, 9)
- Manny LaCarrubba – additional engineering (1), second engineering (5)
- Katherine Miller – vocal engineering (1, 5), engineering (3)
- Jim Caruana – second engineering (1–3, 5, 8, 9)
- Thom Kadley – second engineering (1, 3, 5)
- David Gleeson – second engineering (1), additional engineering (2, 9)
- Lolly Grodner – additional engineering (3)
- Michael White – additional engineering (3)
- Rich Lamb – second engineering (3, 5)
- Bill Whittington – engineering (4, 7), mixing (4, 7)
- Todd Moore – assistant engineering (4, 7)
- John Kunz – assistant engineering (4, 7)
- Amy Hughes – assistant engineering (4, 7)
- Michael Fronda – engineering (6)
- Bob Rosa – mixing (6)
- Francis Buckley – engineering (10), mixing (10)
- Chris Fogel – technical director (10)
- Brian Carrigan – assistant engineering (10)
- Lee Anthony – assistant engineering (10)
- Mike Poole – engineering (11)
- Mike McCarthy – engineering (11)
- Keith Compton – engineering (11)
- Bob Ludwig – mastering

== Charts ==
Chart performance for Trey Lorenz
Chart (1992–1993)	Peak position
Netherlands Album Top 100 (Dutch Charts)	66
New Zealand Albums (RIANZ)	35
US Billboard 200 (Billboard)	111
US Heatseekers Albums (Billboard)	1
US Top R&B Albums (Billboard)	32
US Top 200 Pop Albums (Cash Box)	110
