= Trey Lorenz =

American singer-songwriter (born 1969)

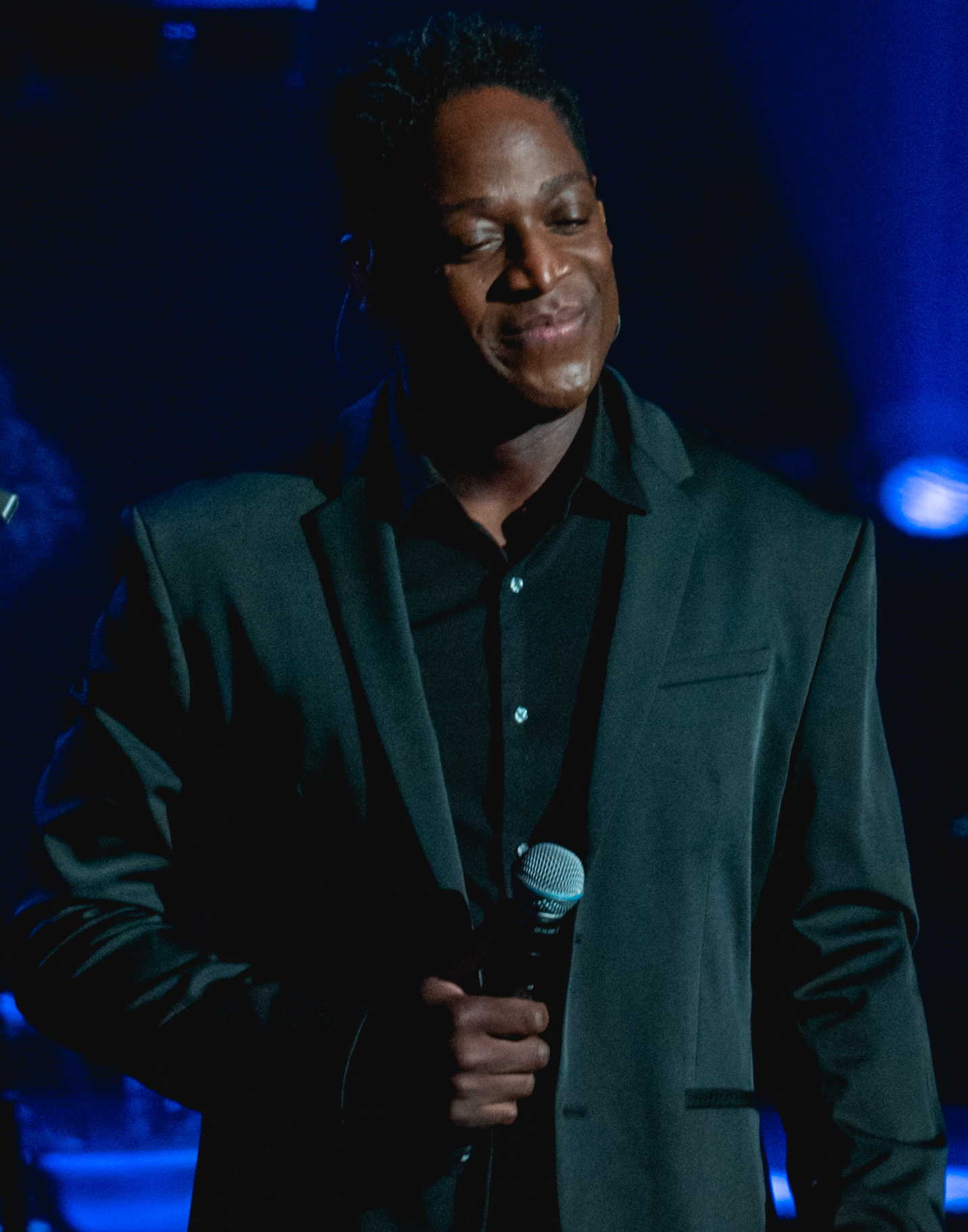
- Trey Lorenz during Mariah Carey's Caution World Tour in 2019.

Background information
- Born: Lloyd Lorenz Smith; January 19, 1969 (age 57)
- Origin: Florence, South Carolina, United States
- Genres: R&B, soul, hip hop soul, neo soul, pop
- Occupations: Singer-songwriter, composer, record producer
- Years active: 1988–present
- Labels: MonarC, Island

Trey Lorenz (born Lloyd Lorenz Smith; January 19, 1969) is an American R&B singer-songwriter and record producer. He was born in Florence, South Carolina and is a graduate of Wilson High School. Lorenz is best known for his duet with recording artist Mariah Carey on "I'll Be There", a cover of the 1970 number-one Jackson 5 recording of the same name. The record topped the US Billboard Hot 100 and R&B singles chart a second time in 1992 and earned Lorenz and Carey both a Grammy Award nomination for Best R&B Performance by a Duo or Group with Vocals. They would later perform the song again at the funeral of Michael Jackson on July 7, 2009. He is also known for his 1992 hit single "Someone to Hold".

== Biography ==
Lorenz met Mariah Carey in 1990, while he was a junior at Fairleigh Dickinson University; at the time, he was singing with the R&B group Squeak & the Deep. He began his career supporting Carey on her first promotional tour in 1990, and the following year he provided background vocals on her album Emotions. Lorenz again served as Carey's backing singer on her March 16, 1992 appearance on the television show MTV Unplugged, where he and Carey sang a cover of the Jackson 5's "I'll Be There" - a duet the two reprised at Michael Jackson's memorial service at the Staples Center in Los Angeles, California on July 7, 2009. Their Unplugged performance was released as a single that went to number one in the United States.

Lorenz was subsequently offered a record deal and recorded a critically successful self-titled debut album. The single "Someone to Hold" (co-written and co-produced by Carey, who also sang backup vocals) peaked at number 19 on the U.S. Billboard Hot 100 singles chart. The album itself, however, only peaked at number 111 on the Billboard 200 albums chart, and Lorenz was dropped by his label Epic Records. In 1994, he co-wrote "If You Go Away" for New Kids on the Block, which was included on their album Face the Music.

Lorenz returned to a career in background vocals, working for artists such as TLC, Selena, and Usher and also performed a duet with Basia titled "She Deserves It" . He also appeared on Redhead Kingpin and the F.B.I.'s 1991 second album The Album with No Name on the songs "It's a Love Thang (Word)", "Nice and Slow" and "Get It Together". He began to support Mariah Carey on her albums and concert tours again in 1997, including a featured spot in the 2003 Charmbracelet World Tour, and he recorded the songs "Make You Happy" for the Men in Black soundtrack, which he co-wrote with Carey and Cory Rooney, and "I'm Still Not Over You" for the Money Train soundtrack. He was signed to Carey's short-lived imprint label, MonarC, and to Jermaine Dupri's Atlanta-based So So Def Records label, but never put out any music under the label.

Lorenz's second album, Mr. Mista, was released on September 16, 2006. Among the songs on the new album is "See You Sometime", a song Lorenz sang during the Charmbracelet World Tour. Lorenz launched his second album during the time he was prominently featured in Carey's 2006 The Adventures of Mimi Tour, doing background vocals and singing three songs, "Never Too Much", "A House Is Not a Home" and "Crazy".

Lorenz appeared on Jessica Simpson's 2010 PBS Christmas Special, singing a duet version "O Holy Night" with her. In 2014, he accompanied Carey on her The Elusive Chanteuse Show concert tour from October 4 to November 16, and also in her 2018 shows, in her Caution World Tour and in her residencies "The Butterfly Returns" (2018-2020) and "The Celebration Of Mimi" (2024-2025). In 2024, he released a single called "Magic" and he performed it on GMA. In 2025 he released "Makes Me Wanna Dance".

== Discography ==
=== Studio albums ===
- Trey Lorenz (1992)
- Mr. Mista (2006)

=== Singles ===
- 1992: "Wanna Girl" (uncharted; European B-side of "Someone to Hold")
- 1992: "Someone to Hold" #19 US Billboard Hot 100, #5 US R&B, UK #65
- 1993: "Photograph of Mary" #46 US R&B, #11 US Dance, UK #38
- 1993: "Just to Be Close to You" #66 US R&B
- 2007: "My Everything"
- 2007: "Pisces" Featuring Mariah Carey
- 2011: "Rescue Me"
- 2024: "Magic"
- 2025: "Makes Me Wanna Dance!"

=== Guest appearances ===
- 2011: "Is This Time Goodbye (I Gotta Move On)" (Trey featured as vocalist on Harry 'Choo Choo' Romero's single)
