= Ren Klyce =

American sound designer

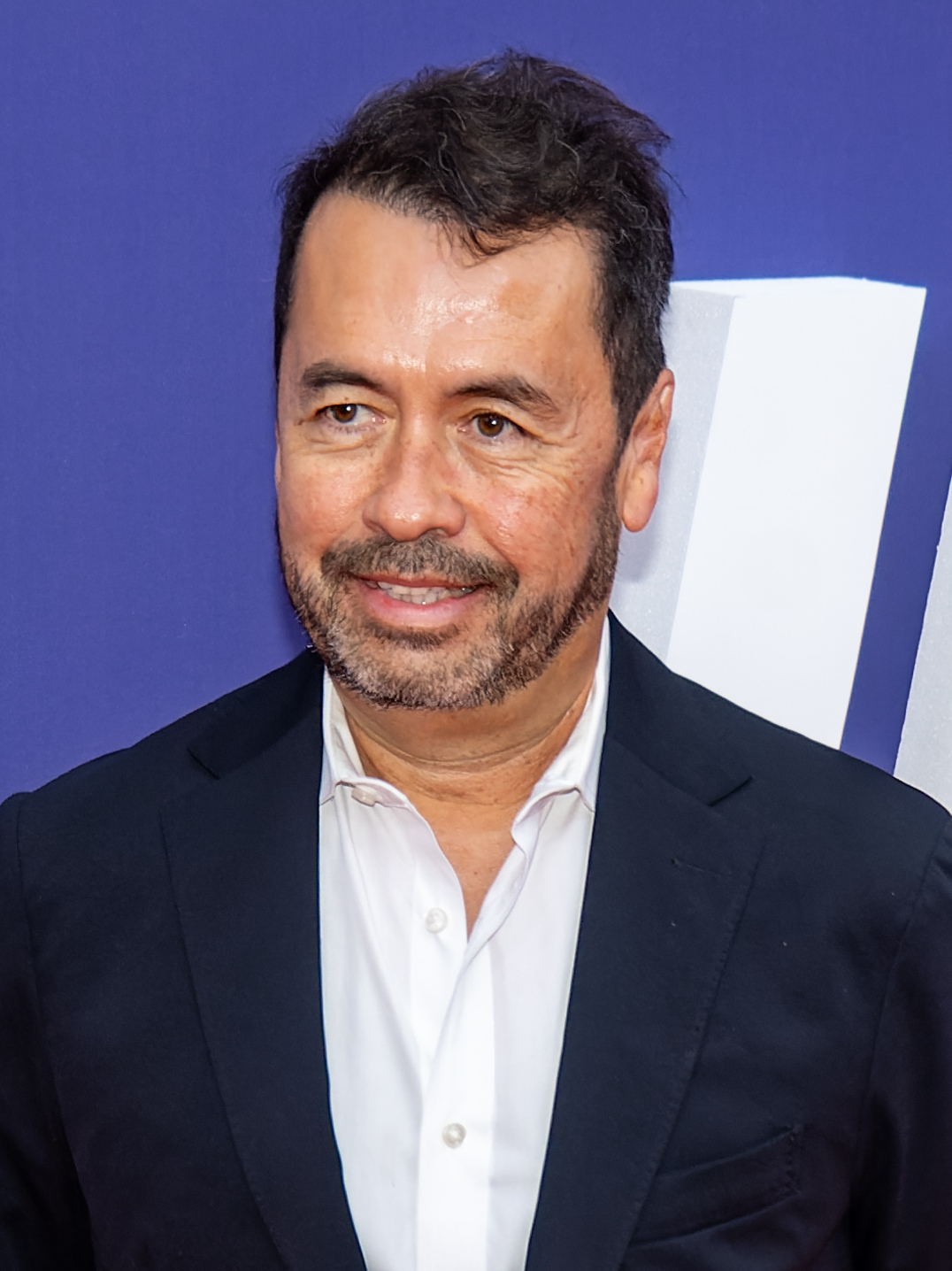
- Klyce in 2023
- Born: Kyoto, Japan
- Occupations: Sound editor, re-recording mixer, musician
- Years active: 1987–present

Ren Klyce is a Japanese-American sound designer and sound mixer.

== Career ==
He has been nominated for nine Academy Awards; six for Best Sound and three for Best Sound Editing. He is best known for his frequent collaborations with director David Fincher, having been the primary sound designer on every one of his films since Seven, including The Girl with the Dragon Tattoo. He is also known for his frequent collaborations with Spike Jonze and films by Pixar Animation Studios.

Klyce was born in Kyoto, Japan, and moved to California at a young age, where he grew up in Mill Valley. He graduated from the University of California, Santa Cruz.

== Filmography ==
- Se7en (1995) - Sound Designer/Effect Supervisor
- The Game (1997) - Sound Designer/Supervising Sound Editor
- Fight Club (1999) - Best Sound Editing
- Being John Malkovich (1999) - Sound Designer
- Panic Room (2002) - Sound Designer
- Zodiac (2006) - Sound Designer/Re-Recording Mixer/Supervising Sound Editor
- The Curious Case of Benjamin Button (2008) - Supervising Sound Editor/Re-Recording Mixer - Best Sound Mixing
- Where the Wild Things Are (2009) - Sound Designer/Re-Recording Mixer
- The Social Network (2010) - Sound Designer/Supervising Sound Editor/Re-Recording Mixer - Best Sound Mixing
- The Girl with the Dragon Tattoo (2011) - Sound Designer/Supervising Sound Editor/Re-Recording Mixer - Best Sound Mixing and Best Sound Editing
- Oblivion (2013) - Supervising Sound Designer
- House of Cards (2013-2018) - Sound Designer
- Her (2013) - Sound Supervisor
- The Boxtrolls (2014) - Supervising Sound Designer/Re-Recording Mixer
- Gone Girl (2014) - Sound Designer/Re-Recording Mixer/Sound Supervisor
- Inside Out (2015) - Sound Designer
- Alice Through the Looking Glass (2016) - Supervising Sound Editor
- Star Wars: The Last Jedi (2017) - Sound Designer/Re-Recording Mixer/Supervising Sound Editor
- Mindhunter (2017-2018) - Sound Designer
- Incredibles 2 (2018) - Sound Designer/Supervising Sound Editor
- Toy Story 4 (2019) - Sound Designer/Supervising Sound Editor
- Mank (2020) - Sound Designer/Re-Recording Mixer/Supervising Sound Editor
- Soul (2020) - Sound Designer/Re-Recording Mixer/Supervising Sound Editor
- Turning Red (2022) - Sound Designer/Re-Recording Mixer/Supervising Sound Editor
- Lightyear (2022) - Sound Designer/Re-Recording Mixer/Supervising Sound Editor
- Elemental (2023) - Sound Designer/Re-Recording Mixer/Supervising Sound Editor
- The Killer (2023) - Sound Designer/Supervising Sound Editor/Re-Recording Mixer
- Inside Out 2 (2024) - Sound Designer/Re-Recording Mixer/Supervising Sound Editor
- Hoppers (2026) - Sound Designer/Re-Recording Mixer
- Toy Story 5 (2026) - Sound Designer/Re-Recording Mixer
- The Further Mis-Adventures of Cliff Booth (2026) - Sound Designer/Supervising Sound Editor/Re-Recording Mixer

== Session discography ==
- Divine Emotion (1988) - Narada Michael Walden - Synthesizer [Fairlight CMI]
- Verge of Love (1988) - Yoko Oginome - Synthesizer [Fairlight CMI], Percussion Programming
- Indestructible (1988) - Four Tops - Synthesizer [Fairlight CMI]
- Through the Storm (1989) - Aretha Franklin - Synthesizer [Fairlight CMI], Keyboards
- Stay with Me (1989) - Regina Belle - Synthesizer [Fairlight CMI]
- A Night with Mr. C (1989) - Clarence Clemons - Synthesizer [Fairlight CMI]
- Be Yourself (1989) - Patti LaBelle - Synthesizer [Fairlight CMI]
- License to Kill (1989) - Gladys Knight - Synthesizer [Fairlight CMI], Sequence Programming
- So Happy (1989) - Eddie Murphy - Synthesizers [Fairlight CMI, Emulator II]
- Good to Be Back (1989) - Natalie Cole - Synthesizers [Fairlight CMI, Emulator II]
- I'm Your Baby Tonight (1990) - Whitney Houston - Synthesizer [Fairlight CMI], Programming
- Kiss Me with the Wind (1990) - Brenda Russell - Synthesizer [Fairlight CMI]
- Mariah Carey (1990) - Mariah Carey - LinnDrum, Synthesizer [Fairlight CMI], Rhythm Programming
- Can You Stop the Rain (1991) - Peabo Bryson - Drums, Percussions, Synclavier, Synthesizer Programming [Akai]
- Emotions (1991) - Mariah Carey - Programming, Synclavier, Synthesizer [Akai]
- H.I.T.S. (1991) - New Kids on the Block - Synthesizer [Akai], Synclavier
- Trey Lorenz (1992) - Trey Lorenz - Programming, Synclavier, Synthesizer [Akai], Producer, Drum Programming, Keyboards
- Breathless (1992) - Kenny G - Programming, Synthesizer [Akai]
- Celine Dion (1992) - Celine Dion - Synclavier, Synthesizer Programming [Akai]
- Music Box (1993) - Mariah Carey - Keyboard Programming, Synclavier, Synthesizer Programming [Akai], Synthesizer [Roland]
- Penny Ford (1993) - Penny Ford - Drums, Bass Programming, Drum Programming, Synthesizers [Akai, Fairlight CMI]
- Passion (1993) - Regina Belle - Programming, Synthesizer [Akai]
- The Colour of My Love (1993) - Celine Dion - Synthesizer Programming [Akai]
- Songs (1994) - Luther Vandross - Additional Programming, Synthesizer [Akai]
- Head over Heels (1995) - Paula Abdul - Drum Programming [Additional]
