= Safety Geeks: SVI =

2009 comedy web series

Cover of the first season of the show

Safety Geeks: SVI was a comedy webseries released in 2009 that depicted the absurd events around a procedural investigation team. The Professional Occupational Safety Hazard (P.O.S.H.) team fallaciously investigates safety violations and accidents. They are in fact "idiots" and as a result of their inept, well-meaning service, they cause considerable additional damage.

The show incorporated over 1400 composite effect shots. It featured Brittney Powell, Tom Konkle, David Beeler, Benton Jennings, Mary Cseh, Steve Tom, Jim Woods, Mark Teich, Ransford Doherty. A single season and eleven episodes were filmed. A 3D version of the show was released in 2010.

The show was nominated for a Streamy webseries award in 2010 for "Best Visual Effects in a Web Series."
