= Falling Sky =

- Directed by: Russ Brandt; Brian J. De Palma
- Written by: Brian J. De Palma
- Produced by: Mark Burman; Jan Eisner; Gary Shar; Sabrina Sipantzi
- Starring: Karen Allen; Brittany Murphy
- Cinematography: Russ Brandt
- Edited by: Daniel Loewenthal
- Music by: Daniel Getz; Ivan Koutikov
- Production companies: Shar Visions; Burman Entertainment; MEB Entertainment; Walpen Adventures; Blue Rider Pictures
- Distributed by: DEJ Productions
- Release dates: August 1998 (Nice Film Festival); August 26, 2005 (DVD)
- Running time: 95 minutes
- Country: United States
- Language: English

Falling Sky (also known as Crocodile Tears) is a 1998 American drama film starring Karen Allen, Brittany Murphy and Jeremy Jordan. It was released direct-to-video in the UK in 1999 and wasn't released in the US until August 26, 2005. It follows Emily, a girl who moves to Las Vegas with her alcoholic mother as she tries to pursue a singing career.

== Synopsis ==
Emily and her alcoholic mother, Reese, have moved to Las Vegas for a fresh start and so Reese can pursue a singing career. Reese tells Emily that alcoholism runs in the family and she is at risk of having it too. Emily often finds herself in the maternal role, having to take care of her mother. After Reese kills herself in the bathtub, Emily finds a recorded tape saying "I'm sorry Emily, but I'm just so tired." Devastated, Emily turns to drinking, and the "prophecy" comes true.

After seeing what alcohol has done to her life, Emily drives to a lake and tries to drown herself. At the last minute, she gasps for air and says, "My mother chose to die. There was nothing I could do to ease her pain. Except maybe, choosing to live."

== Cast ==
- Karen Allen as Reese Nicholson
- Brittany Murphy as Emily Nicholson
- Jeremy Jordan as Vance
- Chris Young as Kyle
- Patrick Renna as Mark
- R. D. Robb as C.C.
- Lea Moreno as Allie
- Vincent Riotta as Mr. Hanes
- Giselle Anthony as Stacy
- Montana Dillenberg as Young Emily
- Michael Dempsey as Tom Collins
- Jennifer Jernigan as Prostitute
- Robert Langston as Willie
- Dianne Kay as Waitress
- Ali Gage as Trucker Chic
