= Try My Love (Jeremy Jordan album) =

Studio album by Jeremy Jordan
- Released: April 13, 1993
- Studios: Larrabee; Front Page; The Bennett House; Mad Fly; The Power Station; Studio Center; Studio LaCoCo; Oakshire; Bad Animals; Encore
- Genres: New jack swing; R&B
- Length: 55:12
- Label: Giant
- Producers: Robbie Nevil; Keith Thomas; Lottie Golden; Tommy Faragher; Nick Mundy; Al B. Sure!; Kyle West; Donald Parks; Emmanuel Officer; John Howcott; Tony Galvin; Rhett Lawrence; Laytham Armor; Timar

Jeremy Jordan chronology
Try My Love (1993)	Where Do We Go From Here (2013)

Alternative cover
- Jeremy The Remix cover

Singles from Try My Love
- 1. "The Right Kind of Love" Released: November 5, 1992; 2. "Wannagirl" Released: April 24, 1993; 3. "Try My Love" Released: 1993; 4. "My Love Is Good Enough" Released: May 12, 1994

Try My Love is the debut album by American singer Jeremy Jordan, released in 1993 by Giant Records. The album features a blend of contemporary R&B and pop tracks, produced by Robbie Nevil, Al B. Sure!, Keith Thomas, Rhett Lawrence, among others. The lead single, "The Right Kind of Love", was previously included on the Beverly Hills, 90210 soundtrack and became Jordan's most successful song internationally. Other singles from the album include "Wannagirl", "Try My Love", and "My Love Is Good Enough", some of which were promoted with music videos and featured in films like Airborne (1993).

In addition to its standard release, a Japan-exclusive compilation titled Jeremy The Remix was issued, featuring remixed versions of three tracks from Try My Love. The compilation reached number 70 on the Oricon Albums Chart.

On the US Billboard 200, Try My Love debuted at number 176 on May 15, 1993, peaking at number 182 the following week and remaining on the chart for two weeks. Critical reception noted the polished, radio-oriented production and the success of "The Right Kind of Love", while observing variability in the quality of other tracks.

== Background and recording ==
Before achieving musical recognition, Jordan experienced a difficult upbringing. Having spent part of his childhood in orphanages and later living on the streets, he began seeking opportunities in theater and music during his teenage years. At the age of nineteen, after moving to Los Angeles, he managed to attract the attention of music producers and record executives.

During a live event, Jordan was invited to sing without a demo track and performed "It's So Hard to Say Goodbye" a cappella. His rendition impressed Peter Schivarelli, a manager associated with the band Chicago and who had also worked with Janet Jackson and Paula Abdul. Schivarelli helped Jordan secure a contract with Giant Records. After signing with the label, Jordan began working within a three-week period with a team of established producers, which included names such as Robbie Nevil, Al B. Sure!, Keith Thomas, and Rhett Lawrence.

== Music and lyrics ==
Musically, Jordan's debut album is characterized by a radio-ready contemporary R&B sound emblematic of the early 1990s. According to AllMusic, the album showcases "Jordan's soulful if slight voice with a radio-ready, synth-heavy R&B; production". The track "The Right Kind of Love" was described as a "mid-tempo, doo-wop-inspired love song [...] replete with multipart vocal harmonies [and] synthesizer chords [that] bop along in regular eighth-note pulses above a sparse bass line and funky guitar and synthesizer fills".

Lyrically, the album is predominantly centered on themes of love and relationships. Jordan stated that "As a debut album, my aim was to come out with a positive record which talks about love and relationships...to make people happy". He also noted that although the lyrics to "The Right Kind of Love" were written by Robbie Nevil, they contained the exact words to describe his feelings at that particular point in time.

== Release and promotion ==
To promote Jordan's debut, Giant Records followed a strategy similar to its previous soundtrack-driven successes. The label had earlier used the New Jack City soundtrack to launch Color Me Badd and the Class Act soundtrack to boost Jade's visibility. This time, it relied on the popularity of the Beverly Hills, 90210 soundtrack, which featured Jordan's song "The Right Kind of Love". The single was released ahead of the album and gained attention alongside Motown artist Shanice's "Saving Forever for You", another track from the same soundtrack that reached the Top 40 on the Billboard Hot 100.

Following the release of Try My Love, Jordan embarked on an international promotional tour that included performances in Malaysia, where he held press conferences and appeared on local television shows. The singer met hundreds of fans at the East End stage in Subang Parade, Malaysia, during a promotional event. His performance included "The Right Kind of Love" and "Wannagirl".

== Singles ==
"The Right Kind of Love" was released in late 1992 as one of the main tracks from the Beverly Hills 90210 soundtrack and was later included on Jordan's debut album. The single was praised by music critics. Billboard called it an "urbanized pop ditty" with retro-soul influences and teen radio appeal. Smash Hits described it as "bumpy grindy soul stuff" and a convincing New Kids impersonation. Gavin Report noted its "cool, rhythmic hook". It became the most successful single by Jordan, peaking at number 14 on the US Billboard Hot 100 and number 5 in Australia.

"Wannagirl", released in early 1993, reached No. 28 on the Billboard Hot 100, No. 11 on the Mainstream Top 40, No. 20 on Radio Songs, and No. 24 on the Rhythmic in the U.S., as well as No. 42 in Top Singles Canada, and No. 22 in Australia. Billboard described it as "a slick and chirpy jack/pop workout" and add that "he sure does deserve a more substantial, less gimmicky song". A music video was also released to promote the single.

"Try My Love", released in 1993, was accompanied by a music video directed by Antoine Fuqua. The song was also featured in the film Airborne (1993). The European maxi-single (Giant Records,9 18446–4, 4–18446) includes both the radio edit and instrumental versions of the track, while a "Vocal Breakdown" remix appears on the album Jeremy The Remix.

"My Love Is Good Enough": released in 1994. In its review, Larry Flick of Billboard praises the song as Jeremy Jordan's "strongest single to date", highlighting his ability to exude considerable sex appeal while maintaining his teen idol image. Hitmakers praised the song as proof that the singer should not be dismissed as merely a "teen idol" or "heartthrob", and described it as "damn good". It failed to chart and no music video was made. The song was included in the 1993 movie Airborne. The maxi-single includes 4 alternative versions: "InDaSoul Radio Mix" (3:58); "M.Doc & Jere MC Street Radio Mix" (3:56), "Jamie's House Edit" (4:16), "InDaSoul Extended Instrumental" (4:59).

== Jeremy The Remix ==
Taking advantage of the album's chart presence in Japan, where it reached the top 40 on the Oricon Albums Chart, Giant Records released a country-exclusive compilation titled Jeremy The Remix. The compilation featured ten tracks, including three songs from Try My Love: "The Right Kind of Love", "Wannagirl", and "Try My Love", along with their respective remixed versions. Issued solely in the CD format, the compilation included additional material such as postcards, photographs, and a thank-you letter addressed to fans. On the Oricon Albums Chart the album peaked at number 70 and sold 6,510 copies.

== Critical reception ==
Professional ratings
Review scores
Source	Rating
AllMusic	3/5 stars

New Sunday Times noted that the album "speaks of love in various forms" and that Jeremy is "a winner all the way".

Matt Collar of AllMusic wrote that Try My Love showcases Jeremy Jordan's "soulful if slight" voice over radio-ready R&B production, and although the album contains too much filler, its hit "Right Kind of Love" "almost qualifies as a classic of the decade".

== Commercial performance ==
The album entered the Billboard 200 chart on May 15, 1993, debuting at its peak position of number 176. In its second week, it rose to its peak position of number 182, remaining on the chart for a total of two weeks. In Japan, the album peaked at number 31 on the Oricon Albums Chart, selling 69,100 copies.

== Track listing ==
Try My Love track listing
No.	Title	Writer(s)	Producers	Length
1.	"Instrlude"	Jeremy Jordan		1:26
2.	"My Love Is Good Enough"	Robbie Nevil; Steve Dubin	Nevil	4:56
3.	"Wannagirl"	Keith Thomas; Tony Haynes	Thomas	4:29
4.	"The Right Kind of Love"	Lotti Golden; Nevil; Tommy Faragher	Golden; Faragher	4:33
5.	"Try My Love"	Nick Mundy	Mundy	4:55
6.	"Do It to the Music"	Al B. Sure!; Kyle West	Al B. Sure!; West	4:35
7.	"A Different Man"	Dave Simmons; Emanuel Officer; John Howcott	Donald Parks; Officer; Howcott	4:54
8.	"Lovin' on Hold"	Parks; Officer; Howcott	Donald Parks; Officer; Howcott	4:31
9.	"I Wanna Be With You"	Darcy Touré; Parks; Officer; Howcott	Donald Parks; Officer; Howcott	4:36
10.	"Girl You Got It Goin' On"	B. Wild; Rhett Lawrence; Haynes	Lawrence	3:38
11.	"Show Me Where It Hurts"	Laythan Armor; Nevil	Armor	4:28
12.	"My Name Is J.J."	Al B. Sure!	Timar	4:32
13.	"It's Alright (This Love Is for Real)"	Golden; Nevil; Faragher	Nevil	3:50

Japanese bonus tracks
No.	Title	Length
14.	"Wannagirl" (Streetgirl Mix)	6:06
15.	"The Right Kind of Love" (Hip Hop Jeep Mix)	5:45

Jeremy The Remix
No.	Title	Length
1.	"The Right Kind of Love" (Main Mix (No Rap))	4:11
2.	"The Right Kind of Love" (Sex Mix)	4:32
3.	"The Right Kind of Love" (Rock Solo)	4:11
4.	"The Right Kind of Love" (Quiet Storm Mix)	5:46
5.	"Wannagirl" (Preferred Pop Mix)	4:00
6.	"Wannagirl" (A Cappella Mix)	4:32
7.	"Wannagirl" (Streetgirl Instrumental)	5:30
8.	"Try My Love" (Radio Edit)	4:03
9.	"Try My Love" (Vocal Breakdown)	4:39
10.	"Try My Love" (Instrumental)	4:54

== Personnel ==
Credits adpted from Try My Love CD (Giant Records – 9 24483–2)

- Art Direction – Kim Champagne
- Design – Gregory Ahtens Gilmer
- Executive-Producer – Cassandra Mills
- Management – Peter Schivarelli
- Mastered By – Tom Baker
- Photography By – Michael Lavine

== Charts ==
Weekly charts for Try My Love.
Chart (1993)	Peak position
Australian Albums (ARIA)	29
Japanese Albums (Oricon)	31
US Billboard 200	176
US Top Heatseekers	9

Weekly charts for Jeremy The Remix.
Chart (1993)	Peak position
Japanese Albums (Oricon)	70
