= Photograph of Mary =

Single by Trey Lorenz

from the album Trey Lorenz
- Released: December 1992
- Studio: Record Plant (Sausalito); Right Track (New York City); Record Plant (Los Angeles)
- Genre: Dance; R&B; pop
- Length: 4:26
- Label: Epic
- Songwriter: Seth Swirsky
- Producers: Walter Afanasieff; Mariah Carey

Trey Lorenz singles chronology
"Someone to Hold" (1992)	"Photograph of Mary" (1992)	"Just to Be Close to You" (1993)

Music video
- "Photograph of Mary" on YouTube

"Photograph of Mary" is a dance, R&B, and pop song recorded by American singer Trey Lorenz for his eponymous debut studio album, Trey Lorenz (1992). Epic Records released it as the album's second single in December 1992. Written by Seth Swirsky, the lyrics concern a man regretting the end of a relationship with a woman while looking at her picture. A "na na na" hook functions as the chorus. Walter Afanasieff and Mariah Carey produced "Photograph of Mary" and others produced remixes.

Music critics gave the song positive reviews, several describing it as catchy. To promote the release, Lorenz performed on the British television program GMTV and starred in a music video. "Photograph of Mary" peaked within the top forty on record charts in the United Kingdom, Canada, and New Zealand. It reached number forty-six on Billboard's Hot R&B Singles in the United States and gained success on dance music charts in other regions.

== Background and release ==
As a college student, Trey Lorenz befriended singer Mariah Carey in 1990 and became one of her background vocalists. With her assistance, he auditioned for Epic Records executives and signed a contract with the label. In March 1992, the pair performed a cover version of the Jackson 5 song "I'll Be There" on the television program MTV Unplugged. After it reached number one on the US Billboard Hot 100 chart, Epic moved the release of Lorenz's eponymous debut record Trey Lorenz forward by several months to October 1992. The label released the album's second track, "Photograph of Mary", as its second single. It marked his foray into dance material after the lead single, pop/R&B ballad "Someone to Hold".

In the United States, Epic issued "Photograph of Mary" on 7-inch vinyl, 12-inch vinyl, and cassette formats. The label released it to urban contemporary radio stations in December 1992, and later released it in the United Kingdom on January 18, 1993, on 7-inch vinyl, 12-inch vinyl, and CD. To support the single, Lorenz performed live on British television network ITV's morning program GMTV. A Japanese mini CD single followed on February 21, 1993, and a music video starring Lorenz was also released.

== Music and lyrics ==
"Photograph of Mary"
"Photograph of Mary" features a "na na na" chorus in a composition characterized by keyboards, guitars, and digital programming.

"Photograph of Mary" is a dance, R&B, and pop song with gospel influences. The track features a fast tempo and lasts for four minutes and twenty-six seconds. The chorus contains a "na na na" hook, which Dave Sholin of the Gavin Report thought resembled that in Elton John's 1970 single "Take Me to the Pilot". The lyrics concern a man looking at a picture of a woman named Mary and lamenting the loss of their relationship through his actions.

Seth Swirsky wrote the lyrics and composed the music for "Photograph of Mary". Walter Afanasieff produced and arranged the song with Carey. It features keyboards played by Afanasieff and Dan Shea, guitars strummed by Michael Landau, and digital programming by Afanasieff, Shea, Ren Klyce, and Gary Cirimelli. Lorenz, Carey, Mark C. Rooney, Patrique McMillan, and Karen Anderson provided background vocals. According to Music Week's Alan Jones, the beat is similar to songs by the group Soul II Soul. John Martinucci of the Gavin Report considered the track's production "punchy" and Johnny Dee of Smash Hits said it "bumps along in a meaty big and bouncy funky way".

Dana Jon Chappelle recorded "Photograph of Mary" at the Record Plant in California and Right Track Recording in New York City with assistance from David Gleeson and Jim Caruana. He mixed it at Right Track and Bob Ludwig conducted mastering at Masterdisk in Manhattan. Rooney and Mark Morales, Speech, Michael Brauer, Masters at Work, and the Characters produced R&B, hip hop, and house music remixes of the single.

== Critical reception ==
"Photograph of Mary" received positive reviews from American and British critics. (Note: Such as Johnny Dee of Smash Hits, Alan Jones of Music Week, Andy Jones of Newsday, John Marrs of the Northants Herald & Post, and Timothy White of Billboard) Music Week writer Bob Jones gauged it as "great" and Dave Sholin called it a "winner" in the Gavin Report. Music & Media's Steve Morton and Billboard considered it an effective vocal showcase for Lorenz. The latter magazine and Peter Kinghorn of the Evening Chronicle described the hook and beat as catchy, respectively. In contrast, the Accrington Observer's Guy Rayner deemed the track "wimpish-sounding rubbish".

== Commercial performance ==
"Photograph of Mary" appeared on music charts in Europe, North America, and Oceania. In Canada, the song peaked at number nineteen on The Record's Retail Singles list. It reached the top forty on the primary New Zealand and United Kingdom singles charts (numbers thirty-one and thirty-eight, respectively). It did not match this performance in the United States and instead topped out at number eighteen on Billboard's Bubbling Under Hot 100 Singles, which lists the top twenty-five songs not yet qualified to appear on the main Hot 100. The song fared better on the country's R&B charts; it reached number forty-six on Billboard Hot R&B Singles and number thirty-seven on Cash Box R&B Singles. On the urban contemporary radio chart published by Radio & Records, the single peaked at number twenty.

"Photograph of Mary" experienced success on dance music charts. In the United States, the song achieved top-ten positions on Billboard's Maxi-Singles Sales (number six) and Cash Box's Dance Singles (number seven). It peaked at number eleven on the European Dance Radio list produced by Music & Media and the American Club Play chart published by Billboard. In the United Kingdom, "Photograph of Mary" reached number seventeen on the Chart Information Network's dance singles list and the remixes peaked at number twenty-five on the Record Mirror Club Chart compiled by Music Week.

== Track listings ==
7-inch vinyl/cassette/mini CD single

A. "Photograph of Mary" (Album Version) – 4:26
B. "Photograph of Mary" (Characters Radio Remix) – 3:58

12-inch vinyl single

A1. "Photograph of Mary" (Kenlou B-Boy Mix) – 5:53
A2. "Photograph of Mary" (Characters Hard Mix) – 4:54
B1. "Photograph of Mary" (Masters At Work Dub) – 6:16
B2. "Photograph of Mary" (Bass Hit Dub) – 6:09

CD single 1

1. "Photograph of Mary" (LP Version Edit) – 4:09
2. "Photograph of Mary" (Characters Hard Radio Remix) – 3:52
3. "Photograph of Mary" (Michael Brauer R&B Remix) – 4:11
4. "Photograph of Mary" (Rooney & Morales Remix) – 3:42
5. "Photograph of Mary" (Characters Radio Remix) – 3:58
6. "Photograph of Mary" (Speech Remix) – 5:41

CD single 2

1. "Photograph of Mary" (Album Version) – 4:26
2. "Photograph of Mary" (Speech Remix) – 5:41
3. "Photograph of Mary" (Kenlou B-Boy Mix) – 5:53
4. "When Troubles Come" – 5:11

== Credits and personnel ==
Recording

- Recorded at the Plant Recording Studios (Sausalito, California), Right Track Recording (New York City), the Record Plant (Los Angeles)
- Mixed at Right Track Recording (New York City)
- Mastered at Masterdisk (New York City)

Personnel

- Trey Lorenz – lead vocals, background vocals
- Seth Swirsky – songwriter
- Walter Afanasieff – producer, arranger, keyboards, synth bass, rhythm programming
- Mariah Carey – producer, arranger, background vocals
- Dana Jon Chappelle – engineering, mixing
- David Gleeson – additional engineering
- Jim Caruana – second engineering
- Ren Klyce – Akai programming, Synclavier programming
- Gary Cirimelli – Macintosh programming, Synclavier programming
- Dan Shea, additional keyboards, additional programming
- Michael Landau – guitars
- Mark C. Rooney – background vocals
- Patrique McMillan – background vocals
- Karen Anderson – background vocals
- Bob Ludwig – mastering

== Charts ==
1993 weekly chart performance
Chart (Publisher)	Peak position
Australia (ARIA)	155
Canada Retail Singles (The Record)	19
Europe Dance Radio (Music & Media)	11
New Zealand Singles (RIANZ)	31
UK Singles (CIN)	38
UK Dance Singles (CIN)	17
UK Airplay (ERA)	43
UK Club (Music Week) Remixes	25
US Bubbling Under Hot 100 Singles (Billboard)	18
US Club Play (Billboard)	11
US Hot R&B Singles (Billboard)	46
US Maxi-Singles Sales (Billboard)	6
US Top 30 Dance Singles (Cash Box)	7
US Top 100 R&B Singles (Cash Box)	37
US Top 40/Urban Crossover (Gavin Report)	16
US Urban Contemporary (Gavin Report)	21
US Urban Contemporary (Radio & Records)	20
