= Try My Love (song) =

Single by Jeremy Jordan

from the album Try My Love
- Released: July 1993
- Genre: Pop
- Length: 4:54
- Label: Giant Records
- Songwriter: Nick Mundy

Jeremy Jordan singles chronology
"Wannagirl" (1993)	"Try My Love" (1993)	"My Love Is Good Enough" (1994)

Music video
- "Try My Love" on YouTube

"Try My Love" is a song by American singer Jeremy Jordan, released in 1993 as the third single from his debut and only studio album, Try My Love (1993). Written and produced by Nick Mundy, the track is a R&B ballad.

The track was also included in the soundtrack of Rob Bowman’s 1993 comedy-drama film Airborne, alongside Jordan's other contribution, "My Love Is Good Enough". The single was accompanied by a music video directed by Antoine Fuqua, which intersperses scenes from the film Airborne with footage of Jordan performing the song.

Upon its release, "Try My Love" received modest airplay in the United States and Australia. Critics responded mixedly: Billboard praised Jordan's charisma and vocal potential but described the song as too familiar to distinguish itself from other pop ballads of the era.

== Overview ==
"Try My Love", which also lends its name to Jeremy Jordan's debut album, serves as the opening track in the form of an interlude titled "Instrlude". This introductory piece features only an instrumental excerpt of the original song, accompanied by a few of Jordan's vocal lines, and runs for 1:26. The full version of the song, composed by Nick Mundy, has a total length of 4:55.

The song was included in the soundtrack of Rob Bowman's 1993 comedy-drama film Airborne, which received mixed reviews from major publications. Critics and fans have noted that Jeremy Jordan's contribution, which also includes the song "My Love Is Good Enough", helps reinforce the film's nostalgic and youthful atmosphere, that resonates with audiences familiar with 1990s pop culture.

The music video premiered at the week of September 10, 1993 on American television programming, and later peaked at number 13 on The Network Forty U.S. video chart. The video was directed by Antoine Fuqua and intersperses scenes from Airborne with Jordan performing the track.

== Critical reception ==
In its review of the single, Billboard described Jordan as a "photogenic teen-idol-in-training" showcasing his vocal ability on a love ballad. The magazine noted that while Jordan displayed "sex appeal and emotion" and possessed "a palatable voice to work with", the song " itself sort of leaves him high and dry" and "rings too familiar to rise above the pack".

== Commercial performance ==
The single peaked at number 72 on the ARIA Singles Chart. In the United States, the song appeared in Radio & Records reports between August and September 1993. It debuted in the issue dated August 20, 1993, with nineteen stations adding it to their playlists. In the following weeks, "Try My Love" continued to expand regionally. Gavin Report noted that "Try My Love" received moderate airplay in the United States, debuting at number 11 on its "Up & Coming" chart in the issue dated August 20, 1993, after being added by twelve radio stations. The single remained on the list for about seven weeks, reaching its peak with that debut position and continuing to appear through mid-September, when it was last listed at number 14 in the issue dated September 10, 1993.

== Track listing ==
EU maxi-single

1. Try My Love (Radio Edit) 4:01
2. Try My Love (Album Version) 4:54
3. Try My Love (Instrumental) 4:56

U.S. cassette single

1. Try My Love (Album Version) 4:52
2. Try My Love (Instrumental) 4:53

== Charts ==
Weekly charts for "Try My Love"
Chart (1993)	Peak position
ARIA Charts.	72

== Personnel ==
Credits adapted from the cassette single Try My Love (Giant Records, 9 18446-4, 4-18446).

- Produced by Nick Mundy
- Executive Producer Cassandra Mills
- Management Peter Schivarelli / PJS Management
- Design Gregory Crispin Gilmer
- Photography by Michael Lavine
- Written by Nick Mundy ("One Day I'm Gonna Make It Music"/Warner-Tamerlane Pub. Corp., BMI)
