= The Right Kind of Love =

1992 single by Jeremy Jordan

Single by Jeremy Jordan

from the album Try My Love
- Released: December 1992
- Genre: Soul; pop
- Length: 4:32
- Label: Giant
- Songwriters: Tommy Faragher; Lotti Golden; Robbie Nevil
- Producers: Tommy Faragher; Lotti Golden; Robbie Nevil

Jeremy Jordan singles chronology
"The Right Kind of Love" (1992)	"Wannagirl" (1993)

"The Right Kind of Love" is a song recorded by American singer and actor Jeremy Jordan, written and produced by Tommy Faragher, Lotti Golden and Robbie Nevil. It was released in late 1992 as one of the lead singles from the Beverly Hills, 90210: The Soundtrack and later appeared on Jordan’s debut album Try My Love (1993), issued by Giant Records.

Musically, the song blends elements of pop, R&B, and new jack swing and a rhythmic groove characteristic of early 1990s teen pop. Critically, "The Right Kind of Love" received favorable attention from contemporary music publications, including Billboard, which praised its catchy rhythm and vocal style. The single reached number 14 on the Billboard Hot 100 and number five in Australia, remaining on the U.S. chart for 25 weeks.

== Background and release ==
Before gaining recognition as a musician, Jeremy Jordan faced a challenging childhood, spending time in orphanages and living on the streets before turning to theater and music as a teenager. At nineteen, after moving to Los Angeles, he caught the attention of industry professionals when he performed "It's So Hard to Say Goodbye" a cappella at a live event, impressing manager Peter Schivarelli, who helped him sign with Giant Records. Soon after, Jordan began recording with a team of well-known producers, including Robbie Nevil, Al B. Sure!, Keith Thomas, and Rhett Lawrence.

== Composition ==
"The Right Kind of Love" has been characterized as a "mid-tempo, doo-wop-inspired love song [...] replete with multipart vocal harmonies [and] synthesizer chords [that] bop along in regular eighth-note pulses above a sparse bass line and funky guitar and synthesizer fills". It also takes the form of "an urbanized pop ditty" with "a finger-snappin' rhythm base" supporting "retro-soul keyboards" drawing stylistic comparisons to acts such as Color Me Badd, New Kids on the Block.

Lyrically, the song conveys themes of romancey. Jordan himself noted that although the lyrics were written by Lotti Golden, they resonated with his own experiences at the time.

== Critical reception ==
Retrospective reviews and music guides
Review scores
Source	Rating
Smash Hits	3/5 discs

Billboard wrote that the song is "a strong indicator of Jordan's potential", that showcased vocals "slightly reminiscent of Color Me Badd and New Kids on the Block". Smash Hits described the song as "bumpy grindy soul stuff", and "a very convincing New Kids impersonation" which, according to the magazine, "will very likely turn Mr Jordan into an international pop sensation". Gavin Report wrote that the song "features a cool, rhythmic hook and some slick production, thanks to Robbie Nevil, Tommy Faragher and Lotti Golden".

== Commercial performance ==
The single debuted on the Billboard Hot 100 chart on December 12, 1992, eventually reaching its peak position at number 14 on March 27, 1993. It remained on the chart for a total of 25 weeks.

== Music video ==
The music video for "The Right Kind of Love" was featured on the FOX series Beverly Hills, 90210 with the music video tacked onto the credit sequence. It opens with Jordan playing basketball among five young men before transitioning to scenes of him singing, dancing, and interacting with his teammates. Throughout the video, Jordan appears with two female love interests, alternating between playful and romantic moments.

== Track listing ==
- US maxi-CD single
1. "The Right Kind of Love" (main mix—no rap) – 4:09
2. "The Right Kind of Love" (main mix) – 4:09
3. "The Right Kind of Love" (radio fade mix) – 4:09
4. "The Right Kind of Love" (Hip Hop Jeep mix) – 5:45
5. "The Right Kind of Love" (Quiet Storm mix) – 5:45

== Charts ==
=== Weekly charts ===
Chart (1992–1993)	Peak position
Australia (ARIA)	5
Canada Retail Singles (The Record)	7
Canada Top Singles (RPM)	70
Europe (European Dance Radio)	16
Iceland (Íslenski Listinn Topp 40)	36
US Billboard Hot 100	14
US Pop Airplay (Billboard)	4
US Rhythmic Airplay (Billboard)	22
US Cash Box Top 100	15

=== Year-end charts ===
Chart (1993)	Position
Australia (ARIA)	44
US Billboard Hot 100	68

== Release history ==
Region	Date	Format(s)	Label(s)	Ref.
United States	December 1992	—N/a	Giant	
Australia	February 28, 1993	CD; cassette	Giant	
United Kingdom	March 29, 1993	7-inch vinyl; 12-inch vinyl; CD; cassette	Giant; Reprise	
