= Swans Crossing =

1992 American television series

- Genre: Soap opera Teen drama
- Created by: Mardee Kravit; Ned Kandel
- Written by: Mardee Kravit; Steven Scott Smith; Penina Spiegel; Andrew Stoll; Nina Combs
- Starring: Sarah Michelle Gellar; Brittany Daniel; Stacey Moseley; Shane McDermott; Eddie Robinson
- Composer: Robby Merkin
- Country of origin: United States
- Original language: English
- No. of seasons: 1
- No. of episodes: 65

Production
- Executive producers: Ned Kandel; Mardee Kravit
- Producer: Joe Hobel
- Cinematography: Danny Franks; Nick Hutack
- Editors: Steve Babb; Paul Doyle
- Running time: 20–30 minutes
- Production companies: Heliosphere Productions; Newlifier Limited

Original release
- Network: Syndication
- Release: June 29 – September 25, 1992

Swans Crossing is an American teen drama television series created by Mardee Kravit and Ned Kandel. The series stars Sarah Michelle Gellar, Brittany Daniel, Stacey Moseley, Shane McDermott and Eddie Robinson. It aired in syndication from June 29 to September 25, 1992.

== Premise ==
The series chronicled the lives of a group of wealthy teenagers living in the seaside town of Swans Crossing. Sydney Rutledge (Sarah Michelle Gellar) was the daughter of the town's mayor, Margaret Rutledge. They lived right next door to the mayor's political rival, Grant Booth, and his family. Sydney had a close but secret relationship with Grant's son, Garrett (Shane McDermott), but the parents found out and built a literal wall between them and their houses. The couple broke up but still stayed in the same social groups, generating a bitter struggle between them as the season progressed.

Other major characters in Swans Crossing were J.T. Adams (Tom Carroll) and Neil Atwater (Eddie Robinson), best friends and scientific geniuses; Bobby "Saja" De Castro (Alex Tanaka); Saja's sister Sophia Eva McCormick De Castro (Mira Sorvino), Sandy Swan (Kristen Mahon) and Owen Fowler (Evan Ferrante), the talented musicians; Jimmy Clayton (Devin Doherty) and Callie Walker (Stacey Moseley), the auto mechanics; Glory Booth (Carisa Dahlbo), Garrett's younger sister and J.T.'s love interest; mean girl Nancy Robbins (Kristy Barbera), Sydney's best friend; and Mila Rosnovsky (Brittany Daniel), competition for Sydney for Garrett's affection, and the daughter of a countess who is an old friend of the Mayor's.

Spies, first loves, phony birth certificates, and the preservation of endangered species, fueled the plots. One major storyline that never got resolved was Garrett blackmailing Sydney with the fact that he could prove she was swapped at birth with Sandy Swan (the birth certificate was phony). After making peace with Callie and Jimmy, they offered to help Sydney find the evidence to help her disprove it. The 65 episode run ended with a (to be continued) sign, leaving the show on an unresolved cliffhanger.

== Cast ==
- Tom Carroll as J.T. Adams
- Carisa Dahlbo as Glory Booth
- Brittany Daniel as Mila Rosnovsky
- Devin Doherty as Jimmy Clayton
- Sarah Michelle Gellar as Sydney Rutledge
- Shane McDermott as Garrett Booth
- Kristy Barbera as Nancy Robbins
- Evan Ferrante as Owen Fowler
- Kristen Mahon as Sandy Swan
- Stacey Moseley as Callie Walker
- Eddie Robinson as Neil Atwater
- Alex Tanaka as Bobby "Saja" DeCastro
- Jerry Bamman as Captain Walker
- Ziska Beveridge as Mayor Margaret Rutledge
- Delphi Harrington as Countess Valaira Rosnovsky
- William Shanks as Barek
- Nick Wyman as Grant Booth #1
- John Cunningham as Grant Booth #2
- Philip Clark as Coach Grohme
- Mira Sorvino as Sophia DeCastro
- Barry Papick as Baldie #1
- Donald Symington as Ralph
- Laurie Kennedy as Cornelia Booth
- Ashley Chapman as Katie Adams
- Holter Graham as Billy Gunn
- MB Battisti as Jazz
- David Andrew Macdonald as Jerry

== Production ==
The series, which was created by Ned Kandel and Mardee Kravit, was taped at Kaufman Astoria Studios in Queens, home of Sesame Street and The Cosby Show. The show was filmed on videotape and shot and edited in a way to resemble a daytime soap opera similar to that of shows such as All My Children and The Young and the Restless.

== Streaming ==
In July 2015, executive producer Ned Kandel announced on the show's Facebook fan listing, that the series would be available for streaming soon. On December 4, 2015, both ShoutFactoryTV and Hulu made available for streaming all 65 episodes of the series. As of September 2016, Hulu has removed the series from its streaming library. As of March 2025, ShoutFactoryTV has removed the series from its streaming library. The show is now exclusively available on Tubi.

== Merchandising ==
A Swans Crossing series of action figures, Callie's Motorbike a Rock Concert Playset, Mila's Bedroom Playset and Mayor Rutledges car were produced by Playmates Toys.

== Awards and nominations ==
Year	Award	Category	Nominee	Result
1993	14th Youth in Film Awards	Best Young Actress in a New Television Series	Sarah Michelle Gellar	Nominated
1993	14th Youth in Film Awards	Best Young Actor in an Off-Primetime Series	Shane McDermott	Nominated
1993	14th Youth in Film Awards	Best Young Actor in an Off-Primetime Series	Eddie Robinson	Nominated
1993	14th Youth in Film Awards	Best Young Actress in an Off-Primetime Series	Brittany Daniel	Nominated
1993	14th Youth in Film Awards	Best Young Actress in an Off-Primetime Series	Sarah Michelle Gellar	Nominated
