= The Album with No Name =

Studio album by Redhead Kingpin and the F.B.I.
- Released: April 2, 1991
- Studio: Soundtracks, New York City; Hillside, Englewood, New Jersey
- Genre: Hip-hop, new jack swing
- Length: 48:33
- Label: Virgin
- Producer: David "Redhead" Guppy, Joseph "Wildstyle" Mann

Redhead Kingpin and the F.B.I. chronology
| A Shade of Red (1989) | The Album with No Name (1991) | React Like Ya Knew (1993) |

The Album with No Name is the second album by the American musical group Redhead Kingpin and the F.B.I., released on April 2, 1991. It peaked at No. 182 on the Billboard 200. "Get It Together", "We Don't Have a Plan B", and "It's a Love Thang (Word)" were released as singles. As part of his promotional efforts for the album, Redhead Kingpin was scheduled to participate in the charity event at which the City College stampede occurred. Additional promotional efforts were hampered by a hoaxer who booked live dates as Redhead Kingpin and who was eventually arrested.

== Production ==
The album was produced by David "Redhead" Guppy and Joseph "Wildstyle" Mann. Trey Lorenz provided backing vocals on some of the tracks. "All About Red" acknowledges Teddy Riley's new jack swing influence on Redhead Kingpin's musical style. "We Don't Have a Plan B" is a response to accusations that Redhead Kingpin sold out his music. "No Reason" denounces police brutality, using news reports of the shooting of Phillip Pannell. "Soap" is a parody of soap operas. "Interlude" is paean to deceased friends.

The album release date was pushed back due to sampling clearance issues. "Dave & Kwame (Gimme Dat Girl)", which samples "More Peas", by the J.B.'s, is a battle rap between Redhead Kingpin and Kwamé. "3-2-1 Pump!" contains a sample of Earth, Wind & Fire's "Let's Groove". "What Do U Hate" samples Marvin Gaye's "Got to Give It Up".

== Critical reception ==
Professional ratings
Review scores
| Source | Rating |
|---|---|
| AllMusic | 2.5/5 stars |
| RapReviews | 6/10 |
| The Virgin Encyclopedia of Dance Music | 3/5 stars |

The Washington Post said that The Album with No Name "is an upbeat, easily digestible party record, but Red's lyrics aren't shallow... While most of the disc pumps at a frenetic M.C. Hammeresque pace, the romantic ballad 'Nice & Slow' is a sure bet to steam up the summer". The Hamilton Spectator stated that Redhead Kingpin's "sense of fun carries this album". The Manchester Evening News panned the "funky, throwaway tracks". The Huddersfield Daily Examiner praised the "fierce rap ... sly satire and social commentary."

In 2022, RapReviews noted that "Kingpin was a decent rapper with very good production on his debut LP, but on his second album he was an average rapper with average production."

== Track listing ==
| No. | Title | Length |
|---|---|---|
| 1. | "All About Red" |
| 2. | "Soap" |
| 3. | "What Do U Hate" |
| 4. | "Harlem Brown" |
| 5. | "It's a Love Thang (Word)" |
| 6. | "No Reason" |
| 7. | "We Don't Have a Plan B" |
| 8. | "Nice & Slow" |
| 9. | "The Song with No Name" |
| 10. | "Interlude" |
| 11. | "3-2-1 Pump!" |
| 12. | "Wild Style Collage" |
| 13. | "Get It Together" |
| 14. | "Got 2 Go" |
| 15. | "Dave & Kwame (Gimme Dat Girl)" |
