= Redhead Kingpin and the F.B.I. =

American hip hop/new jack swing group

- Redhead Kingpin and the F.B.I.

Background information
- Also known as: Private Investigators
- Origin: New York City, U.S.
- Genres: Hip-hop; new jack swing
- Years active: 1988–1993
- Label: Virgin
- Past members: David "Redhead" Guppy; Joseph "D.J. Wildstyle" Mann; Bo Roc; Lt. Squeak; Buzz; Poochie

Redhead Kingpin and the F.B.I. was an American hip-hop and new jack swing group best known for its debut single and highest-charting song, "Do the Right Thing" from its album A Shade of Red, which peaked at No. 13 on the UK singles chart in 1989. The song was featured on the soundtrack of Wes Craven's horror film The People Under the Stairs (1991).

== Career ==
The group was led by emcee David "Redhead" Guppy (whose hair was a reddish shade of dark brown), who also played keyboards. The F.B.I. consisted of Joseph "D.J. Wildstyle" Mann, Bo Roc, Lt. Squeak, Buzz, and Poochie.

A Shade of Red contained two other singles, "Pump It, Hottie", which reached No. 2 on the US Hot Rap Singles Chart in 1990, and "We Rock the Mic Right". The album was produced by Redhead and Markell Riley from the duo Wreckx-N-Effect (the younger brother of producer Teddy Riley) and was heavily influenced by the new jack swing trend at the time.

In 1991, the group released its second and final album, The Album with No Name. Recorded at Hillside Studios, Englewood, New Jersey, and Soundtracks Studios, New York, The Album with No Name peaked at No. 182 on the Billboard 200, while the song "3-2-1 Pump" reached No. 52 on the Billboard Hot 100.

The group also appeared on a track of the soundtrack of the 1991 film New Jack City. That same year, Guppy made his acting debut in the film Strictly Business, which also starred Halle Berry.

In 1992, Guppy co-wrote the song "Two Can Play That Game", which was recorded by Bobby Brown on his album, Bobby which included Background Vocals from Founding BLACKstreet members Joe Stonestreet, Chauncey Hannibal, & Levi Little.

In 1993, Redhead Kingpin returned with Gicci Brown, D.J. Wildstyle, and Knowledge to form a new group called Private Investigators. Private Investigators had a harder-edged hip hop sound, and released one album titled React Like Ya Knew on Virgin/EMI.

In 2000, Redhead Kingpin produced a track on the Nutty Professor II: The Klumps soundtrack entitled "No (You Didn't Say)" by Kandice Love.

In 2006, Redhead Kingpin was featured on the Nas single "Where Are They Now."

== Discography ==
=== Albums ===
Year	Album	Peak chart positions			
Year	Album	US	US R&B	AUS	UK
1989	A Shade of Red	–	47	102	35
1991	The Album with No Name	182	51	141	–
1993	React Like Ya Knew (as Private Investigators)	-	-	-	–
"–" denotes releases that did not chart.

=== Singles ===
Year	Single	Peak chart positions					
Year	Single	US Dance	US R&B	US Rap	US Pop	AUS	UK
1989	"Pump It Hottie"	37	–	2	–	58	–
1989	"Superbad, Superslick"	–	–	–	–	–	68
1989	"Do the Right Thing"	12	–	8	–	56	13
1990	"We Rock the Mic Right"	–	86	–	–	–	92
1991	"We Don't Have a Plan B"	–	–	–	–	–	–
1991	"All About Red"	–	–	20	–	–	–
1991	"Nice & Slow"	–	66	24	–	–	–
1991	"It's a Love Thang (Word)"	–	–	12	–	148	–
1991	"Get It Together"	–	–	–	–	140	–
1991	"3-2-1 Pump"	–	–	–	52	–	–
"–" denotes releases that did not chart or were not released in that territory.
