= Do the Right Thing (song) =

1989 single by Redhead Kingpin and the F.B.I.

Single by Redhead Kingpin and the F.B.I.

from the album A Shade of Red
- B-side: "A Shade of Red"
- Released: 1989
- Length: 4:05
- Label: Virgin; 10
- Songwriters: David "Redhead" Guppy; Markell Riley
- Producers: The Redhead Kingpin; Markell Riley

Redhead Kingpin and the F.B.I. singles chronology
"Superbad, Superslick" (1989)	"Do the Right Thing" (1989)	"We Rock the Mic Right" (1990)

Audio
- "Do the Right Thing" on YouTube

"Do the Right Thing" is a song by American hip hop and new jack swing group Redhead Kingpin and the F.B.I. from their debut album, A Shade of Red (1989). The track was written for but not used in the Spike Lee film of the same name, but two years later, the song was featured on the soundtrack of Wes Craven's horror film The People Under the Stairs, playing over the end credits. The group's third single, "Do the Right Thing" became their highest-charting song, peaking at number 13 on the UK Singles Chart, number seven in the Netherlands, and number four in New Zealand.

== Track listings ==
7-inch single

A. "Do the Right Thing" (U.S. radio mix) – 4:05
B. "A Shade of Red" – 4:47

US 12-inch single

A1. "Do the Right Thing" (Jazzy 12-inch) – 5:15
A2. "Do the Right Thing" (Jazzy 7-inch) – 3:34
B1. "Do the Right Thing" (Sky 12-inch) – 6:04
B2. "Do the Right Thing" (Sky instrumental) – 4:52

US cassette single

1. "Do the Right Thing" (U.S. radio mix) – 4:04
2. "Do the Right Thing" (12-inch mix) – 6:20

UK mini-CD single

1. "Do the Right Thing" (U.S. radio mix) – 4:05
2. "Do the Right Thing" (12-inch mix) – 6:20
3. "A Shade of Red"

UK 12-inch single 1

A1. "Do the Right Thing" (12-inch mix) – 6:20
A2. "Do the Right Thing" (U.S. street mix) – 3:39
B1. "Do the Right Thing" (Butcher mix) – 2:25
B2. "Do the Right Thing" (acapella) – 2:30

UK 12-inch single 2

A1. "Do the Right Thing" (Happiness remix)
B1. "Do the Right Thing" (212 "Sky" King Remix)
B2. "Do the Right Thing" (Happiness 7-inch remix)

== Charts ==
=== Weekly charts ===
Chart (1989–1990)	Peak position
Australia (ARIA)	56
Belgium (Ultratop 50 Flanders)	20
Canada Dance/Urban (RPM)	9
Europe (Eurochart Hot 100)	41
Netherlands (Dutch Top 40)	7
Netherlands (Single Top 100)	11
New Zealand (Recorded Music NZ)	4
Switzerland (Schweizer Hitparade)	16
UK Singles (Official Charts)	13
US 12-inch Singles Sales (Billboard)	21
US Dance Club Play (Billboard)	12
US Hot Rap Singles (Billboard)	8
West Germany (GfK)	12

=== Year-end charts ===
Chart (1989)	Position
Netherlands (Dutch Top 40)	65
US Hot Rap Singles (Billboard)	27

Chart (1990)	Position
New Zealand (RIANZ)	15
