= Dancin' on the Ceiling =

Studio album by The Beck Family
- Released: 1979
- Studio: Secret Sound recording studio
- Label: LeJoint LEJ 17001
- Producer: T. Life

Dancin' on the Ceiling was a studio album by The Beck Family, an R&B vocal group from Philadelphia. It made the Billboard Soul LPs chart in 1979. It contained the hit song, "Can't Shake the Feeling" which registered on four USA charts and charted in Canada. Another song, "Words and Music" was a popular song for the UK dancefloors.

== Background ==
The February 10 issue of Billboard mentioned that The Beck Family were getting ready for the first release on the LeJoint label. The intended release was to be called The Beck Family. However, when the album was released, it was called Dancin' on the Ceiling. It was released in the UK on London SHE 8534. It was there in the UK that an album track, "Words and Music" became a popular dancefloor song.

Phyllis Hyman was one of the backing vocalists on the album.

On the week of May 5, the album was a "breakout" at The Soul Shack in Washington.

The hit single, "Can't Shake the Feeling" got to no. 43 on the Billboard Hot Soul Singles chart, no. 37 on the Cash Box Top 100 Black Contemporary singles chart, no. 47 on the Record World Black Oriented Singles chart, and no. 137 on the Record World Singles 101 - 150 chart. It also made it to no. 25 on the RPM Weekly Disco Playlist chart.

The follow-up single, "Falling in Love Again" was released on LeJoint 5N34005. It was a recommended soul single in Billboards Top Single Picks for August 4, 1979.

At the end of 1979, two of the album tracks were being played in Italy. On December 11, 1979, "Dancin' on the Ceiling" was getting played on Canale 5, on the Musica leggera in stereofonia program in Italy. On December 14, "Can't Shake the Feeling" was being played on the same program.

== Reviews ==
=== Billboard ===
It was reviewed in the March 17 issue of Billboard. It had a positive review, with the picks being, "Can't Shake the Feeling", Dancin' on the Ceiling" and "Falling in Love Again". The review said it had pop crossover potential, and it would get r&b and disco airplay.

=== Cash Box ===
Their album was also reviewed in the March 24, 1979 issue of Cash Box. The review said that the T. Life produced album had potential for chart action and airplay, and R&B, disco and pop interest.

=== Music Week ===
It was reviewed in the June 23 issue of Music Week. The reviewer called it was somewhere between pop and r&b. The reviewer also called it light and infectious and that it could pick up airplay.

== Chart ==
On the week of May 12, 1979, the album entered the Billboard Soul LPs chart at no. 72. It held that position for another week.

== Track listing ==
Dandin' on the Ceiling
No.	Track	Composer	Time	Notes
A1	"Can't Shake the Feeling"	B. Greene; T. Life; G. Sokolow; G. Smith	4:50	
A2	"Dancin' On the Ceiling"	M. Bailey	3:46	
A3	"Words and Music"	M. Bailey	5:09	
A4	"Nobody But You"	J. Fitch; R. Cross; B. Greene; T. Life*	3:25	
B1	"Falling in Love Again"	T. Life; B. Greene; C. Cotton	4:24	
B2	"Can You Feel It"	A. Beck; A. Destoutet,	4:36	
B3	" Butterflies"	B. Greene; B. Dunbar; G.Sokolow	3:35	
B4	" Love-A-Thon"	K. Lewis	3:11	
