= Can't Shake the Feeling (The Beck Family song) =

Single by The Beck Family

from the album Dancin' on the Ceiling
- B-side: "Nobody But You"
- Released: April 1979
- Label: LeJoint 5N-34003
- Songwriters: B. Greene, T. Life, G. Sokolow

"Can't Shake the Feeling" was a hit single in 1979 for the Philadelphia R&B disco group the Beck Family. It did well in the US on the Cash Box and Billboard charts.

== Background ==
In early 1979, the Beck Family were getting ready for the first release on the LeJoint label. The intended album title was The Beck Family. When the album was released it was called Dancin' on the Ceiling. It was reviewed in the March 17 issue of Billboard. It got a good review and the picks were, "Can't Shake the Feeling", Dancin' on the Ceiling" and "Falling in Love Again". with pop crossover potential, the expectations were r&b and disco airplay.

"Can't Shake the Feeling" was a Record World Single Pick for the week ending March 17. The review was positive with the magazine calling it a strong debut.

Due to the success of the single in the US, Decca Records in England had an interest in it. Michael McDonaugh of Decca said that they were on the lookout for new disco product. He also said nthat they were excited by what the Beck Family were doing in the US. It was released on a 12" format in the UK. In his review of the single, Paul Sexton of Record Mirror said that it had a great boogie and good party feeling. He also said that it generated more feeling than any other disco record that week. The 7" version was issued in the UK on London HLE 10569, while the 12" version was released on LHLE 10569.

== Airplay ==
The record had done well with airplay. For the week of March 30, Radio & Records recorded its activity in the East where it was in the "Hottest" on WXYV. It was also added to the WILD and WWIN playlists. In the South it was added to two others, incl. WTMP. In the West it was added to the KYAC playlist.

For the week of April 27, Radio & Records reported that it was added to the playlists of WVKO in the Midwest and KDAY in the West.

For the week of May 5, Cash Box reported that it was getting played on Bob Long's show at WCIN in Cincinnati, Steve Woods' show at KDAY in Los Angeles, James Jordan's show at WYBC in New Haven and Linda Haynes' show at WWRL in New York.

On December 14, 1979, "Can't Shake the Feeling" was being played on Canale 5 on the Musica leggera in stereofonia program in Italy.

== Charts ==
=== Cash Box ===
On March 24, 1979, the single debuted on the Cash Box Top 100 Black Contemporary singles chart. Their record was also getting spins on George White's show at WGPR-FM in Detroit, James Jordan's show at WYBC in New Haven and Joe Tamburro's show at WDAS in Philadelphia.

On May 19, at week nine, "Can't Shake the Feeling" reached no. 37 on the Cash Box Top 100 Black Contemporary singles chart. It held that position for another week, spending a total of twelve weeks in the chart.

=== Billboard ===
The single made its debut at no. 79 on the Billboard Hot Soul Singles chart for the week ending April 7, 1979. At week seven for the week ending May 19, it peaked at no. 43.

=== Record World ===
The single made its debut in the Record World Black Oriented Singles chart at no. 71 on the week of April 7. On May 12 at week six, it peaked at #47.

=== RPM Weekly ===
In Canada, the single was getting airplay and on the week of April 14, RPM Weekly recorded it at no. 25 on its Disco Playlist. It was being spun on Gerry O'Day's show at CFMQ-FM in Regina.

=== Record Mirror ===
On the week of June 30, the 12" version was bubbling under the UK Disco Top 90.

=== Summary ===
Chart (1979)	Peak position
US Billboard Hot Soul Singles	43
US Cash Box Top 100 Black Contemporary singles	37
US Record World Black Oriented Singles.	47
US Record World Singles 101 - 150	137
Canada RPM Weekly Disco Playlist	25
