= Jeremy Jordan (singer, born 1973) =

American actor and singer (born 1973)

- Born: Don Henson; September 19, 1973 (age 53); Hammond, Indiana, U.S.
- Genres: Pop; new jack swing; R&B; soul; dance-pop
- Occupations: Actor, singer
- Years active: 1992–2011
- Label: Giant

Don Henson (born September 19, 1973), known professionally as Jeremy Jordan, is an American former singer and actor from Hammond, Indiana.

== Biography ==
Jordan's real name is Don Henson. He was born September 19, 1973, and his mother gave custody of him to his father, who later married another woman and had four more children, all of whom he placed in Mooseheart Child City (an orphanage) after his wife died from leukemia. Once they got to the orphanage, he and his brothers and sisters were separated and every year he spent there, from the third to eleventh grade, he had a different set of houseparents, some of them very violent.

Jordan wanted to get involved in movies and sign with a talent agency in Chicago, but was forbidden since the orphanage was in Mooseheart (near North Aurora), forty miles away. When he was seventeen, before Thanksgiving 1991, he moved to Chicago to stay with a friend's parents. After a fight he was evicted from the house where he was living and ended up homeless, living in the subway until he met his manager Peter Schivarelli. He then signed a record deal with his record company.

In 1993, Jordan released Try My Love on Giant Records. The album yielded the international hit singles, "The Right Kind of Love" (#5 Billboard Hot 100 Airplay, #14 Billboard Hot 100 Singles, #4 Billboard Top 40 Mainstream, #22 Billboard Rhythmic Top 40), produced and written by Lotti Golden, Tommy Faragher & Robbie Nevil, and "Wannagirl" (#11 Billboard Top 40 Mainstream, #24 Billboard Rhythmic Top 40, #28 Billboard Hot 100). Additionally, "My Love Is Good Enough" and "Try My Love" were featured in the film Airborne. "The Right Kind of Love" music video was featured during the end credits of Beverly Hills, 90210 and was also on the television series' soundtrack. A remix album, Jeremy The Remix, was released to overseas markets in late 1993.

In 1994, it was reported that Jordan, then promoted by Giant Records as a young pop music sex symbol, was putting the finishing touches on a new album scheduled for release early the following year. The cover was photographed by acclaimed fashion photographer Bruce Weber, who had previously captured Jordan in a nude photoshoot for Interview magazine — images that generated considerable buzz at the time and contributed to his rising image as a daring, photogenic performer. However, despite the anticipation, the second album ultimately never materialized. Years later, in 1999, Jordan briefly returned to music with the song "A Girl Named Happiness (Never Been Kissed)", featured on the soundtrack of the film Never Been Kissed, starring Drew Barrymore, in which Jordan himself also appeared. The song received its own official music video, though a commercial single release was never issued.

From 1994 to 2011, Jordan transitioned into acting and appeared in a number of films, including Falling Sky with Brittany Murphy, television films like Twisted Desire with Melissa Joan Hart, as well as independent films such as Leaving Las Vegas with Nicolas Cage, Julian Po with Christian Slater, and Nowhere directed by Gregg Araki.

== Filmography ==
=== Film ===
Year	Title	Role	Notes
1995	Live Nude Girls	Jeffery - Greenpeace Boy	
1995	Leaving Las Vegas	College Boy #2	
1996	Bio-Dome	Trent	
1996	Poolboy	Poolboy	
1997	Nowhere	Bart	
1997	Julian Po	Bobby	
1998	Falling Sky	Vance	
1999	Dreamers	Dave Jacobson	
1999	Never Been Kissed	Guy Perkins	
2011	The Absent	Rob	

=== Television ===
Television
Year	Title	Role	Notes
1994	ABC Afterschool Specials	Johnny	"Boys Will Be Boys"
1996	Twisted Desire	Nick Ryan	Television film
1996	The Drew Carey Show		
1996	Ellen		
1997	Skeletons	Aryan Boy	Television film
1997	Gun	Baggy Pants	Episode: "Ricochet"
1997	Subway Stories: Tales from the Underground	Boy #2	Television film
1999	Storm of the Century	Billy Soames	2 episodes

== Discography ==
=== Studio albums ===
List of albums, with selected chart positions
Title	Album details	Peak chart positions				Sales
Title	Album details	US	US Heat	AUS	JPN	Sales
Try My Love	Released: April 13, 1993; Label: Giant Records; Format: LP, cassette, CD.	176	9	29	31	World: 400,000; JPN: 69,100
Where Do We Go From Here	Released: 2013; Label: none; Format: CD-R	—	—	—	—	

=== Compilation albums ===
List of albums, with selected chart positions
Title	Album details	Peak chart positions	Sales
Title	Album details	JPN	Sales
Jeremy The Remix	Released: 1993; Label: Giant Records; Format: Cassette, CD	70	JPN: 6,510

=== Singles ===
Year	Title	Peak chart positions						Certification	Album
Year	Title	US	US Pop	US Radio	US Rhyt.	AUS	CAN	Certification	Album
1992	"The Right Kind of Love"	14	4	11	22	5	70	ARIA: Gold	Try My Love
1993	"Wannagirl"	28	11	20	24	22	42		Try My Love
1993	"Try My Love"	—	—	—	—	72	—		Try My Love
1994	"My Love Is Good Enough"	—	—	—	—	—	—		Try My Love
