= Ain't It All Right =

Song by Nick Mundy
- A-side: "Ain't It All Right"
- B-side: "I Apologize"
- Released: 1984
- Length: 3:56
- Label: Columbia 38-04689
- Composer: N. Mundy - P. Butler
- Producers: Nick Mundy in Association with Ron Moseley for Prima Donna International and in Association with Muntrish Productions

"Ain't It All Right" was a single for musician Nick Mundy. Released in 1984, it became a hit and charted in the Billboard Hot Black Singles chart.

== Background ==
The song was composed by Nick Mundy and Patricia Butler. It was released on Columbia 04689 in 1984. It was the New and Noteworthy pick in the singles review section for November 17 issue of Billboard. Mundy's Motown-influenced phrasing and the stylish dance production and the potential for national prominence were noted.

The recording was issued in a 12" format in 1984 on Columbia 44-05132.

== Airplay ==
It was noted by Radio & Records that it was seeing significant action. It was added to the play lists of KMJM, WZEN-FM, and seeing action at KRNB, WNHC, WQQK and KOKA. It was noted by Cash Cox that it was added to the playlist of WYLD in New Orleans on the week of December 15. It was noted by Cash Box that getting airplay at KJMQ in Houston for the week of December 29. The following week it was added to the playlists of WATV, WEAS and WTLC. It was also on the playlists of WNHC, WQQK, and KOKA.

== Charts ==
"Ain't It All Right" debut and peaked at number 89 on the Billboard Hot Black Singles chart on December 22, 1984.
