= Brittney Powell =

German-American actress (born 1972)

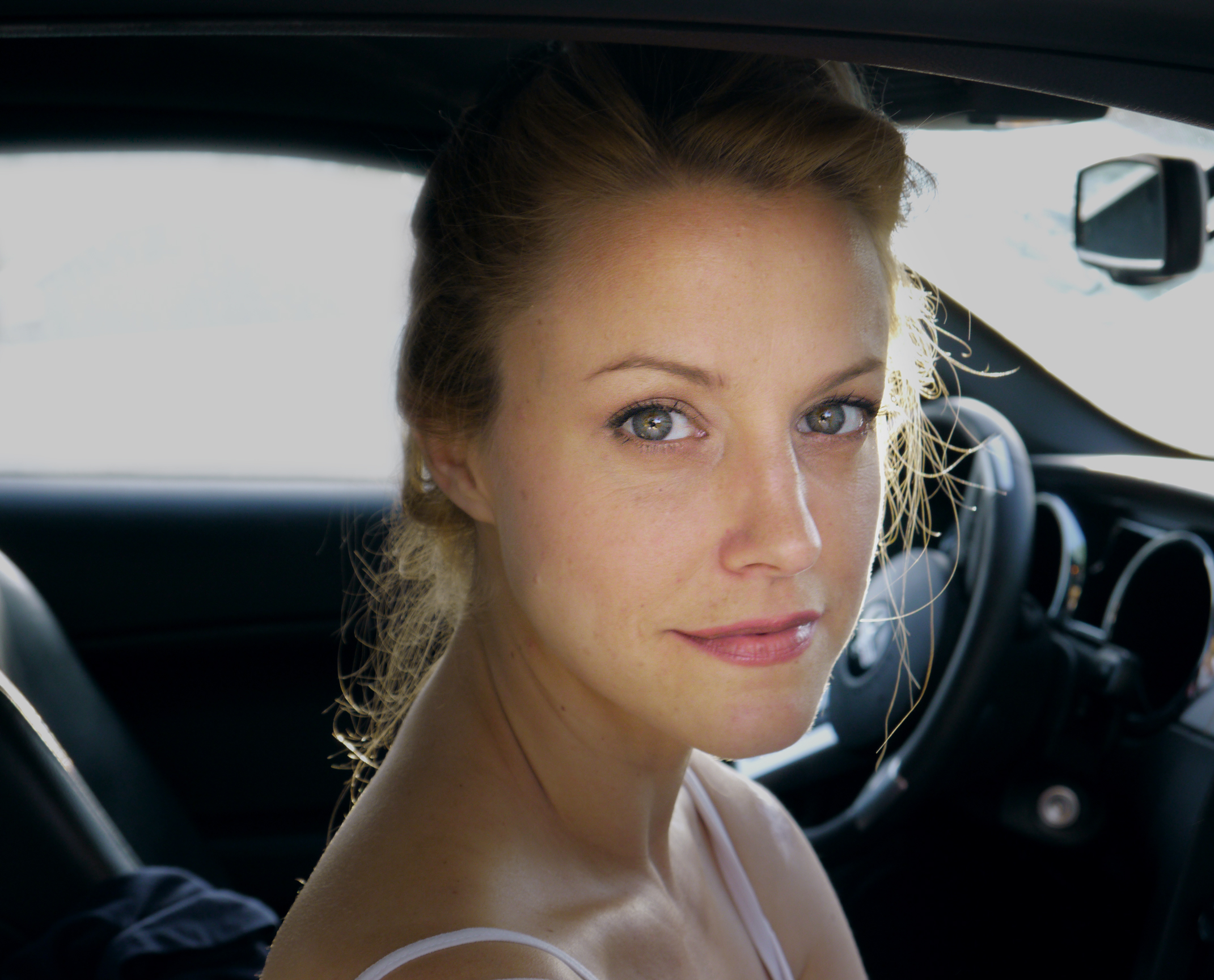
- Powell in November 2012
- Born: March 4, 1972 (age 54); Würzburg, Bavaria, West Germany
- Other name: Brittney Rache
- Occupation: Actress
- Years active: 1991–present
- Spouse: Kevin O'Bannon (divorced)
- Partner: Verne Troyer (2007–2018; his death)
- Children: 1

Brittney Powell (born March 4, 1972) is a German-American actress and model. She has starred in Safety Geeks: SVI.

== Career ==
In 1991, Powell started her career in Playboy: Girls of Spring Break as herself. She then went on to be a contestant on Round Trip to Heaven. On television, she has made guest star appearances in episodes of various series, including Friends, Harry and the Hendersons, California Dreams, The Commish, Silk Stalkings, NCIS, and Safety Geeks: SVI.

Her film roles include Airborne, That Thing You Do!, and the title role in Stacy's Mom.

Powell had a main cast role in the short-lived series Pacific Palisades (1997). She was cast as Summer Halloway on General Hospital in 2002 where she had a contract role.

== Filmography ==
Year	Title	Role
1991	Playboy: Girls of Spring Break	Herself
1991	Round Trip to Heaven	Contestant
1993	Karate Tiger 7: To Be the Best	Cheryl
1993	Airborne	Nikki
1994	The Unborn II	Sally Anne Philips
1994	Dragonworld	Beth Armstrong
1995	Renegade	Brittnay
1996	That Thing You Do!	Shades Fan
1996	Fled	Cindy/Faith
1997	L.A. Johns	Liz Shelby
2007	Misty & Sara	Sara Parsons
2009	A Tribute to Big Red	Herself
2010	Stacy's Mom	Stacy's Mom
2018	Trouble Is My Business	Jennifer Montemar

== Television ==
Year	Title	Role	Notes
1992	Harry and the Hendersons	Kate	Episode: "The Old Bigfoot"
1992	2000 Malibu Road		1 episode
1992	California Dreams	Randi Jo	3 episodes
1993	Eden	Josh's Lover	Episode: "Pilot"
1993	Saved by the Bell: The College Years	Jennifer Williams	Episode: "Professor Zack"
1994	The Commish	Christine	Episode: "Security"
1994	Heaven Help Us	Aerobics Instructor	Episode: "Beauty and the Least"
1994, 1995	Weird Science	Paula Sparks, Roxanne Adams	2 episodes, 1 episode
1994	Saved by the Bell: The New Class	Karen Jensen	Episode: "Brian's Girlfriend"
1995	High Sierra Search and Rescue	Kaja	Main cast
1995	Marker	Tricia Madsen	Episode: "Spiked Through the Heart"
1995	The Jeff Foxworthy Show	Sherry	Episode: "A Non-Affair to Remember"
1995	Silk Stalkings	Maddie Paston	Episode: "Sweet Punishment"
1995	Friends	Jade	Episode: "The One with Five Steaks and an Eggplant"
1995	High Tide	Elaine Mathis	Episode: "Mermaid"
1996	Renegade	Brittney	Episode: "Love Hurts"
1996	The Client	Alana	Episode:"Money Talks"
1996–1997	Tarzan: The Epic Adventures	Emma	2 episodes
1997	Pacific Palisades	Beth Hooper	Main cast, soap opera
1997	Dark Skies	Geena	Episode: "The Last Wave:"
1997	Boy Meets World	Kelly	Episode: "Uncle Daddy"
1997	The Sentinel	Monique St. James	Episode: "Storm Warning"
1999	Beverly Hills, 90210	Robyn	2 episodes
1999–2000	Pensacola: Wings of Gold	Janine Kelly	2 episodes
2000	Martial Law	Lt. P.J. Garrett	Episode: "Honor Among Strangers"
2000	18 Wheels of Justice	Madison Steele	Episode: "The Fire Next Time"
2000	Xena: Warrior Princess	Brunnhilda	3 episodes
2000–2001	Titans	Maureen Keller	Recurring role
2001	18 Wheels of Justice	Denise Sanders	Episode: "Dream Girls"
2002	Bram & Alice	Kristen Chase	Episode: "Required Reading"
2002–2003	General Hospital	Summer Halloway	Contract role, soap opera
2004	Girlfriends	Natalie Kyle	2 episodes
2004	One Minute Soap	Rebecca	Episode: "Too Late"
2004–2005	Phil of the Future	Keely	2 episodes
2005	NCIS	Jamie Carr	Episode: "The Voyeur's Web"
2006	Living with Fran	Nurse Claire	Episode: "Healing with Fran"
2008	Two and a Half Men	Clair	Episode: "Best H.O. Money Can Buy"
2009	Safety Geeks:SVI	Dr. Randi Minky	Main cast, web series

== Personal life ==
Verne Troyer was living with Powell and her son from a previous marriage at the time of his death.
