= Airborne (1993 film) =

1993 American comedy-drama film directed by Rob Bowman

- Theatrical release poster
- Directed by: Rob Bowman
- Screenplay by: Bill Apablasa
- Story by: Stephen McEveety
- Produced by: Bruce Davey; Stephen McEveety
- Starring: Shane McDermott; Seth Green; Brittney Powell
- Cinematography: Daryn Okada
- Edited by: Harry B. Miller III
- Music by: Stewart Copeland
- Production company: Icon Productions
- Distributed by: Warner Bros.
- Release date: September 17, 1993
- Running time: 91 minutes
- Country: United States
- Language: English
- Budget: $2.6 million
- Box office: $2.9 million (domestic)

Airborne is a 1993 American comedy-drama film about inline skating directed by Rob Bowman in his feature film directorial debut, and starring Shane McDermott, Seth Green, Brittney Powell, Chris Conrad, Jacob Vargas and Jack Black.

== Plot ==
Mitchell Goosen is a teenager from California who loves to surf and rollerblade. His zoologist parents are given the opportunity for grant work in Australia for six months. Eager to accompany his parents to the surf-friendly shores of the South Pacific, he is dismayed to find out that he will not be joining them and instead will be living with his aunt and uncle in Cincinnati, Ohio, to finish the remainder of his high school semester. He arrives in the midst of a winter storm quickly coming to the realization that this is far from the free-spirited beach atmosphere that he has been accustomed to. To add to his disillusion, he meets his cousin Wiley, who at first glance is an awkward teenager and whose parents' lifestyle and demeanor, though warm and hospitable, is a bit old-fashioned.

Mitchell is met on his first day at school with obstacles. He is antagonized by the gritty hockey players who chastise Mitchell for his easygoing Maharishi philosophy and California appearance. The hockey players include Jack, Augie, Snake, Rosenblat, and the Banduccis. With an upcoming game against the rival preps, Wiley and subsequently Mitchell are asked to fill-in for two students undergoing punishment for misbehavior. Mitchell inadvertently scores a goal for the preps, cementing the disdain of the hockey players, and in particular Jack, who tackles Mitchell while still on the ice, concussing him and leaving him unconscious for what appears to be hours. Over the course of the next few weeks, Mitchell and Wiley are harassed relentlessly, culminating with Mitchell having a dream which convinces him to peacefully confront the situation.

During the interim, Mitchell falls in love with Nikki. During a double date with his cousin and Nikki's friend Gloria, the leader of the preps, Blane, physically confronts Mitchell, who is only saved when Jack arrives to stand up for Nikki who, as it turns out, is also Jack's sister. Mitchell's dream comes to fruition when he decides to proactively join Jack and his ice hockey brethren for a street hockey game against the preps. Mitchell embarrasses Blane, causing a change of heart from his teammates. Later, Snake, Augie, and the Banduccis solicit Mitchell's help and rollerblading expertise in a race down a harrowing street route termed Devil's Backbone against the preps. It is agreed upon that the first team with three members crossing the finish line will be deemed the winner. An aggressive and athletic Snake reaches the finish first for Mitchell's team, but two preps swiftly follow suit. Needing only one more person to win and with Blane in sight of the end, he decides to barrel into Mitchell but poorly times his attack and instead lands in the waters below. This leaves Jack and Mitchell in clear sight of the finish line, as they approach in tandem victory to the cheers of their awaiting schoolmates, and kisses of respective love interests. Mitchell has finally earned the respect of Jack and his friends, and he is lifted on the shoulders of a cheering crowd.

== Cast ==
- Shane McDermott as Mitchell Goosen
- Seth Green as Wiley Metzner
- Brittney Powell as Nikki
- Chris Conrad as Jack
- Edie McClurg as Irene Metzner
- Patrick O'Brien as Louie Metzner
- Jack Black as Jose Augusto Rafael "Augie" de la Parra
- Alanna Ubach as Gloria
- Jacob Vargas as "Snake"
- Owen Stadele as Blane
- Jessica Boevers as Alexis
- Katrina Fiebig as Debbie
- Chris Edwards as Walt and Stunt Double for Shane McDermott
- Daniel Betances as Tony Banducci
- David Betances as Mark Banducci
- Jason Matthew Smith as Rosenblat
- Travis Hafer (uncredited as Travis) and Tyson Swartz as Ice Skating / Roller Hockey Extra
- Mike Colvin as Hot High School Boy Hockey Crowd Extra
- Christian McVeigh as "Supermac"
- Jim Jenson as Mr Goosen
- Louan Gideon as Ms Goosen
- Brian Winkler as Sean
- Bill Apablasa as Mr Cowley
- Laketa O'Bannon as Stacey
- Napicia Groves as Molly Ryan
- Jay Herold as Clyde
- Larry Bagby III as Jimbo
- Jim Trimble as Jimmy

Additional Members of Team Rollerblade

Jess Dryrenforth Mike Opalek Pat Parnell

== Production ==
Producer Stephen McEveety collaborated on the story with his former schoolmate, speech teacher and children's book writer Bill Apablasa, who also wrote the screenplay. McEveety later brought the project to Icon Productions president Bruce Davey when he joined the company in 1992. During production, filmmakers consulted with professional in-line skaters from Team Rollerblade, who spent twelve days choreographing the skating sequences, performing onscreen stunts, and training the actors in the sport. Principal photography took place during winter 1992 in Cincinnati, Ohio. Although filmmakers later intended to move to snowier landscapes in Minnesota, a recent blizzard in Ohio enabled them to complete all exterior filming within the state. Shooting in the classrooms of Western Hills High School and the School for Creative and Performing Arts took place on weekends and included numerous students as background actors.

== Reception ==
=== Critical ===
On the review aggregator website Rotten Tomatoes, it holds a 31% approval rating, based on 16 reviews, with an average rating of 3.5/10. The website's consensus reads, "Airborne skates downhill with a threadbare story, flat characters, and wince-inducing dialogue."

In a review for the Los Angeles Times, Chris Willman commended the production team for their efforts, praising cinematographer Okada for giving the film "a surprising natural light look" and composer Copeland for providing "a well above average rock score", and giving huge credit to second unit director Steve Boyum, stunt coordinator Pat Parnell and the skaters for making the skating scenes and finale "inherently cinematic".

Willman added that, "Off the skates, it's at best mediocre Nickelodeon fare", writing that "[A]s the first major filmic celebration of in line skating and holy Rollerbladers, Airborne (citywide) is hell on wheels and itchy limbo off. The occasional action scenes are as appropriately tortuous as the tired teen out of water plot is torturous. This is a kid flick that's speed skating on one leg."

The New York Times's Stephen Holden called it "a modest attempt to take a familiar genre, the surf movie, and spin it into a new subgenre, the Rollerblades film."

=== Box office ===
The film was released in 982 theaters. It made $2,850,263 domestically, and $1,262,239 in its opening weekend.
