= Feels Like Love (La Toya Jackson song) =

Song performed by La Toya Jackson

Single by La Toya Jackson
- Released: July 21, 2014
- Recorded: 2013
- Genre: Dance-pop
- Length: 3:03
- Label: Ja-Tail Records
- Songwriters: La Toya Jackson, J Phillips, B Howard
- Producer: Brandon Howard

La Toya Jackson singles chronology
"Home" (2009)	"Feels Like Love" (2014)	"Trouble" (2015)

"Feels Like Love" is a 2014 song by American singer-songwriter La Toya Jackson.

== Song information ==
"Feels Like Love" is an uptempo dance-pop number in the key of B♭ minor. The song is about the power of music and dance to lower one's inhibitions. In the song's chorus Jackson asserts that music "feels like love" and that it "takes my body and I lose control". The lyrics describe a night spent dancing because music "gets me high when I'm feeling low."

The song was produced by Brandon Howard, son of Jackson family friend and singer Miki Howard. Jackson recorded the song while she was planning her wedding to Phillips. In an interview she explained that it put wedge in their relationship. At first, Jackson didn't want to record the song, "I was so against doing this song." Jackson explained that after making changes, the record "turn[ed] out differently. And I like it very much."

The song is Jackson's first single in almost exactly five years, since 2009's "Home". It was released as a digital download by online music retailers on July 21, 2014.

== Reception ==
Mike Wass of Idolator compared the song to her previous dance hits like "Sexbox" and "Sexual Feeling" and called the song "outrageous in its own kooky way."

In The Huffington Post, Carly Ledbetter asserted that the song was "totally worth checking out" because "we actually kind of... love it."

Michael K of Dlisted heralded Jackson's return to music, comparing her favorably to other pop stars like Madonna and Beyoncé. The author proclaimed "that the true Empress of Pop has come back to reclaim her rightful throne!" K claimed that while the song would be lackluster in another artist's hands, Jackson's "artistic skills to turn it into a dance masterpiece."

Instinct also welcomed Jackson back to music, calling her a "diva." The magazine urged readers to "tell all those other pop divas to guard their wigs because La Toya Jackson has dropped her latest single."

The Palm Beach Post described the song as "sizzling" and challenged readers to "see if you can resist hitting the dance floor" when listening to the song.

Tre’well Anderson of NewNowNext called the song a "romantic dance track" and opined that it evokes "some good Janet-meets-Madonna realness."

Lucas Villa of AXS commended the "elegant dance track" for its "slinky synths." Noting that Jackson had "built her career" on dance music, Villa asserted that "Feels Like Love" was a "song fit for the return of a dance music icon."

== Live performances ==
This song was performed at Rasputin Nightclub in West Hollywood in order to promote the single.

== Music video ==
The full music video for "Feels Like Love" was uploaded to streaming sites like YouTube and Vevo on July 26, 2014. The video made its television debut on Jackson's reality show Life With La Toya on the Oprah Winfrey Network on July 27, 2014.

The video was directed by Erik White on location at a Hollywood nightclub called TRU. The clip depicts Jackson performing a dance routine with four female backing dancers. During the dance number Jackson is shown wearing black outfits, gold jewelry, and shoes by Steve Madden. Other scenes show Jackson in a gold evening gown with an updo and at a table sharing a bottle of champagne with a male companion.

Jackson explained to SheKnows that she was nervous about shooting the video, because more than twenty years had passed since she last performed a dance routine in a music video, referring to 1988's "You're Gonna Get Rocked!" Jackson revealed that the video's choreographer insisted that she twerk, but Jackson refused, explaining "that's just not me, it's not my style."

=== Reception ===
Reviewing the music video, Idolator proclaimed that "the thinking man’s Jackson puts on a master class in glamor, allure and elegance."

Terra.com opined that Jackson looked like a "femme fatale" in the video and that the clip enticed viewers to "move your body with sensual movements."

Villa called the video a "glowing comeback clip" and credited Jackson for being able to keep up with her back-up dancers with her "fierce hip swivels and armography."
