= Sarah-Stephanie =

Austrian singer (born 1990)

Sarah-Stephanie (born Sarah Stephanie Markovits; 5 May 1990), mononymously called Stephanie, is an Austrian singer of folk music and pop.

== Career ==
Her career began at the age of eight in the Kiddy Contest on ORF, where she came 4th. This was followed by competitions at home and abroad, where she took first place in the International Contest of Young Singers in Slovenia, for example. At the age of ten, she represented Austria for the first time at the Grand Prix of Folk Music Austria and came fourth. Her second album Ich heiße Stephanie (2001) sold almost 15,000 copies in Austria. With the duet title Dort auf Wolke 7 she won the Grand Prix der Volksmusik 2002 together with the Nockalm Quintett at the age of 12.

In 2004, she took part in the Grand Prix der Volksmusik again, this time with the hit song Dornröschen schläft nicht mehr. She decided to continue her career with pop songs. The album Schenk mir Dein Herz already contained some songs that the singer had written herself, such as Hey Du da oben. The single Schmetterlinge lügen nicht from the summer of 2006 also became famous in Germany. In 2007 Stephanie attended courses at an academy for media communication in Vienna. In 2008 she attended a school in Miami for a year.

In 2009, she released the hit single Eiskalter Sommer, produced by David Brandes, under the name Sarah-Stephanie. The album Herzkommando was released in January 2012. She has been performing under the name Stephanie again since 2013.

After further album releases, she moved from Austria to Holland in 2019 and had a son. In 2020, Stephanie started her comeback after her baby break with a German version of Maggie Reilly's Everytime We Touch as Wenn wir uns berühr'n. This was followed in 2022 by Alleen om van te dromen, sung in Dutch, and in 2023 by Hartslag, a cover version of the song Break My Stride by Matthew Wilder, in which she appears as Steffany for the first time.

== Discography ==
Albums

- 2000 – Mein schönster Traum (Album)
- 2001 – Ich heiße Stephanie (Album)
- 2002 – Stephanie (Album)
- 2004 – Wie ein Luftballon (Album)
- 2006 – Schenk mir Dein Herz (Album)
- 2012 – Herzkommando (Album)
- 2012 – Ich hieß mal Stephanie (Best-of-Album)
- 2015 – Dieser Moment (Album)
- 2018 – Angekommen (Album)

Singles

- 2009 – Eiskalter Sommer (Promo-Single)
- 2009 – Irgendwer weint um dich (Promo-Single)
- 2010 – Sie liebt sie (Promo-Single)
- 2011 – Du hast den Sternenstaub für mich geraubt (Promo-Single)
- 2011 – Herz übernimmt Kommando (Promo-Single)
- 2012 – Nebel in Rom (Promo-Single)
- 2012 – Der bittersüße Geschmack (Promo-Single)
- 2020 – Wenn wir uns berühr'n
- 2022 – Alleen om van te dromen
- 2023 – Hartslag
