= Imagination (La Toya Jackson song) =

Song by American Singer

Single by La Toya Jackson

from the album Imagination
- Released: 1986
- Recorded: 1986
- Length: 2:58
- Label: Private-I Records
- Songwriter(s): Amir Bayyan; Isidro "Cosa" Ross
- Producer(s): Amir Bayyan; Isidro "Cosa" Ross; John Wilson; Meekaaeel

La Toya Jackson singles chronology
"He's a Pretender" (1986)	"Imagination" (1986)	"Oops, Oh No!" (1986)

"Imagination" is a song by American singer La Toya Jackson. It is taken from her fourth album, Imagination. A remixed version of the song was released as a 7" and 12" single.

Some versions of the single include a dub version or extended remix of "Private Joy", a track from her third, and more successful, album Heart Don't Lie.

The single was only released in the United States as a promo.

== Versions ==
- "Imagination" Album version (4:20)
- "Imagination (Remix)" (2:58)
- "Imagination (Dub Mix)" (5:30)
- "Imagination (Hot Dance Remix)" (6:00)
