= Nothing but Trouble =

Nothing but Trouble may refer to:

== Film ==
- Nothing but Trouble (1918 film), starring Harold Lloyd
- Nothing but Trouble (1944 film), a Laurel and Hardy production
- Nothing but Trouble (1991 film), directed by Dan Aykroyd

== Music ==
- Nothin' But Trouble (Blue Murder album)
- Nothin' But Trouble (Nia Peeples album)
- "Nothing but Trouble" (song), a 2015 song by Lil Wayne and Charlie Puth
- "Nothing but Trouble", Eddie Boyd Blues Combo 1961

== Other ==
- Nothing but Trouble: A Kevin Kerney Novel, by Michael McGarrity

== See also ==
- "Girls Ain't Nothing but Trouble", the debut single by DJ Jazzy Jeff and the Fresh Prince
