= Feels Like Love =

Feels Like Love may refer to:

- "Feels Like Love (Danger Danger song), 1989
- "Feels Like Love" (Vince Gill song), 2000
- "Feels Like Love" (La Toya Jackson song), 2014
- "Feels Like Love", a 1982 song by Survivor from Eye of the Tiger
- Feels Like Ishq, an Indian anthology TV series
