= He's a Pretender =

"He's a Pretender" is a 1983 song written by Gary Goetzman (BMI) and Mike Piccirillo (BMI). It was originally recorded by R&B female group High Inergy. This was the lead single of their last album Groove Patrol, before disbanding in 1984, and it peaked at #82 in the Billboard Hot 100, #62 on the Black Singles charts. On the US, Dance/Disco Top 80 chart, "He's a Pretender" went to #25.

== La Toya Jackson version ==
"He's a Pretender"

Single by La Toya Jackson

from the album Imagination
- B-side: "How Do I Tell Them"
- Released: 1986
- Recorded: 1985
- Genre: Pop; R&B; soul; dance
- Length: 3:38
- Label: Private-I Records
- Songwriters: Gary Goetzman, Mikr Piccirillo
- Producers: Joe Isgro; Mike Piccirillo; Gary Goetzman

La Toya Jackson singles chronology
"Baby Sister" (1985)	"He's a Pretender" (1986)	"Imagination" (1986)

La Toya Jackson covered the song on her fourth album Imagination, and it was released as its lead single. The song peaked at #76 on the Billboard Hot Black Singles chart.

The single was released on 7" format with the album track "How Do I Tell Them" on the B-side.

=== Versions ===
No.	Title	Length
1.	"He's a Pretender" (Album version)	3:40
2.	"He's a Pretender" (Album version instrumental)	3:40
