= You Blew =

1988 single by La Toya Jackson

Single by La Toya Jackson

from the album La Toya
- Released: 1988
- Genre: Pop; R&B; soul; dance
- Length: 3:20 (Single version), 4:53 (Album version)
- Label: Teldec Records; RCA Records
- Songwriters: Curt Bedeau; Gerry Charles; Hugh L. Clarke; Brian George; Lucien George; Paul George
- Producer: Full Force

La Toya Jackson singles chronology
"Such a Wicked Love" (1988)	"You Blew" (1988)	"Bad Girl" (1989)

"You Blew" is a 1988 single by American singer La Toya Jackson, taken from her fifth album La Toya. Released on December 20, 1988, The single was produced by hip-hop production team Full Force and was released on 7" and 12" formats in Germany by Teldec Records. Both versions include only two tracks: "You Blew" and "Such a Wicked Love", which had previously been released as a single in the US.

Jackson performed the song in Caracas for the Venezuelan television program "Only For Men" in March 1989 and in two German TV shows, including Günther Jauch's Na Siehste!.

== Release ==
The song was released only in some parts of Europe, including Germany, Austria and Switzerland on her German label only. The song, released as the fifth single from La Toya (1988) was released in November 1988.

== Versions ==
- Album version – 4:54
- 7" edit – 3:20
