= Unique II =

Austrian Eurodance project

- Origin: Vienna, Austria
- Genres: Eurodance
- Years active: 1991–present (Hiatus: 1997–2000)
- Members: Sheila Fernandez; Christian Troy
- Past members: Sandy Cooper; Def Tone; Jade Davies; B-Nice; Phoebe Caren

Unique II (previously Unique 2) is a Eurodance project from Austria. They are best known for their 1996 dance cover of Matthew Wilder's "Break My Stride", which reached No. 1 in Austria and New Zealand, and No. 2 in Australia.

== History ==
Unique II was founded in 1992 by Austrian music producers Erwin Geppner and Werner Freistätter. Together with singer Sandy Cooper and rapper Def Tone they developed the first single, "Iko Iko", which reached No. 8 in Austria. Their debut album Internity reached No. 25 in Austria. A short time later, Sandy Cooper and Def Tone left the group and were replaced by singer Jade Davies (aka Heidi Pfau) and rapper B-Nice. In 1996, Unique II produced their version of Matthew Wilder's classic "Break My Stride". This became the group's biggest success, reaching number 1 in Austria and New Zealand, and No. 2 in Australia. Later that year they released their second album Level II, which reached No. 17 in Austria. Other hits from this album included "Loveline", "Do What You Please" and "I Still Go On", which peaked at No. 2, No. 6 and No. 12, respectively, in Austria. In the late 1990s, Jade Davies left Unique II to begin a solo career. She was replaced by Dutch singer Phoebe Caren. In 1997, B-Nice left the group for a solo career. The group went on a hiatus until 2000 when they released the album Forever, which reached No. 28 in Austria and the eponymous single featuring Filipino singer Sheila Fernandez, which reached No. 8. In the early 2000s, English-born rapper Christian Troy joined the group, and Sheila Fernandez became the new singer. In 2003, they released a Best Of album, featuring remixes of "Break My Stride" and "Loveline". Unique II has become the most successful dance-pop band in Austria, and have received numerous awards, both nationally and worldwide.

== Discography ==
=== Studio albums ===
List of albums, with selected chart positions
Title	Year	Peak chart positions
Title	Year	AUT
Internity	1993	25
Level II	1996	17
Forever – The Album (vs. Sheila Fernandez)	2000	28

=== Compilation albums ===
- Best of Unique II – The Golden Experience (2002)

=== Singles ===
List of singles, with selected chart positions
Title	Year	Peak chart positions				Certifications	Album
Title	Year	AUT	AUS	EUR	NZ	Certifications	Album
"Iko Iko"	1992	8	—	—	—		Internity
"Loveline"	1993	2	—	46	—	IFPI AUT: Gold	Internity
"Changes"	1993	—	—	—	—		Internity
"Free"	1995	—	—	—	—		Level II
"Break My Stride"	1996	1	2	33	1	IFPI AUT: Platinum; ARIA: Platinum	Level II
"Do What You Please"	1996	6	55	—	—	IFPI AUT: Gold	Level II
"For Tonight"	1996	—	—	—	—		Level II
"Dance All Night"	1997	32	—	—	—		Level II
"I Still Go On"	1997	12	—	—	—		Level II
"Around Me"	1998	—	—	—	—		Forever – The Album
"Forever" (vs. Sheila Fernandez)	2000	8	—	—	—		Forever – The Album
"The Way I Need to Go" (vs. Sheila Fernandez)	2000	35	—	—	—		Forever – The Album
"Take Me Higher" (vs. Sheila Fernandez)	2001	43	—	—	—		Forever – The Album
"Colours" (vs. Sheila Fernandez)	2001	32	—	—	—		Best of Unique II – The Golden Experience
"2 Be as 1" (vs. Sheila Fernandez and Christian Troy)	2001	—	—	—	—		Best of Unique II – The Golden Experience
"The Return of Loveline"	2002	—	—	—	—		Best of Unique II – The Golden Experience
"Break My Stride" (Re-Work 2002)	2002	—	—	—	—		Best of Unique II – The Golden Experience

== Links ==
- Unique II on Discogs
