= Baby Sister (song) =

1985 single by La Toya Jackson

Single by La Toya Jackson

from the album Imagination
- Released: 1985
- Length: 3:09
- Label: CBS Records; Sony Records
- Songwriters: Goetzman; Piccirillo
- Producers: Joe Isgro; Mike Piccirillo; Gary Goetzman

La Toya Jackson singles chronology
"Private Joy" (1984)	"Baby Sister" (1985)	"He's a Pretender" (1986)

Audio sample
- file; help

"Baby Sister" is a 1985 single by American singer La Toya Jackson, the first taken from her fourth album Imagination; which was released the following year. The single was released in a 7" format in Japan and later in the United States.

== Background ==
Allmusic described the song as "too cute and overdone to be taken seriously" however The Baltimore Afro-American complimented the track as "new waveish" "ear candy". The single is most notable for being a winner of the "Outstanding Song Award" at the sixteenth annual World Popular Song Festival on October 27, 1985 in Tokyo, Japan, where Jackson performed the song live with younger sister Janet on backup vocals. Jackson brought home a silver medallion and $1000 in prize money. The single includes an instrumental mix of "Baby Sister".

== Track listing ==
JP 7" single (07SP 927)

1. Album version – 3:09
2. Album instrumental version – 4:12

== Janice Marie Johnson version ==
The song originally appeared on Janice Marie Johnson's 1984 solo album One Taste of Honey. Johnson is best known as a member of the band A Taste of Honey.
