= I Don't Speak the Language =

Studio album by Matthew Wilder
- Released: October 13, 1983
- Recorded: 1983
- Studios: Conway Studios (Hollywood) and Sound Castle (Los Angeles)
- Genres: New wave, synth-pop
- Length: 34:22
- Labels: Private-I, Epic
- Producers: Peter Bunetta, Rick Chudacoff, Bill Elliot (for RIPE Productions)

Matthew Wilder chronology
I Don't Speak the Language (1983)	Bouncin' Off the Walls (1984)

Singles from I Don't Speak the Language
- 1. "Break My Stride" Released: August 1983; 2. "I Don't Speak the Language" Released: 1983; 3. "The Kid's American" Released: August 1984

I Don't Speak the Language is the debut studio album by American musician Matthew Wilder, released in 1983 on Private-I and Epic Records. It spawned Wilder's signature hit "Break My Stride".

== Critical reception ==
Professional ratings
Review scores
Source	Rating
AllMusic	4/5 stars

== Track listing ==
1. "Break My Stride" (Matthew Wilder, Greg Prestopino) - 3:04
2. "The Kid's American" (Wilder) - 4:36
3. "I Don't Speak the Language" (Wilder, Barbara Hyde) - 4:45
4. "Love Above the Ground Floor" (Wilder, Prestopino) - 4:13
5. "World of the Rich and Famous" (Wilder, Roscoe Beck) - 4:43
6. "Ladder of Lovers" (Wilder, Prestopino) - 4:04
7. "I Was There" (Wilder) - 3:01
8. "Dreams Keep Bringing You Back" (Wilder, Prestopino) - 4:36
9. "I Don't Speak the Language" (Reprise) - 1:20

== Personnel ==
- Matthew Wilder – lead vocals, backing vocals (1, 2, 4–6, 8), Prophet-5 (1), Prophet-10 (2, 3, 5, 6, 9), acoustic piano, (4, 7, 8), horn arrangements (4), Rhodes Chroma (5)
- Bill Elliott – Prophet-5 (1), acoustic piano (2), Prophet-10 (3, 4, 6, 7, 9), horn arrangements (4)
- Bill Cuomo – Prophet-5 (3, 6, 8, 9), Rhodes Chroma (3, 5, 6, 8, 9)
- Paul Fox – E-mu Emulator (5, 7)
- Dennis Herring – guitars (1, 2, 7)
- Donald Griffin – guitars (4, 5)
- Tim Weston – guitar solo (5)
- John McFee – mandolin (8)
- Reggie McBride – bass (2, 5)
- Rick Chudacoff – bass (4, 6, 7)
- Alphonso Johnson – bass (8)
- Peter Bunetta – drums, Oberheim DMX (1), percussion (1)
- John Gilston – Simmons drum programming and sequencing
- Paulinho da Costa – percussion (3, 6, 8, 9)
- Jerry Peterson – baritone saxophone (2)
- Lon Price – tenor saxophone (2)
- Bill Armstrong – trumpet (4)
- Gary Grant – trumpet (4)
- Greg Prestopino – backing vocals (1, 2, 8)
- Joe Turano – backing vocals (1, 2, 7, 8)
- Arno Lucas – backing vocals (2, 5)
- Leslie Smith – backing vocals (2, 5)
- Dee Dee Bellson – backing vocals (3, 4, 9)
- Mary Hylan – backing vocals (3, 4, 9)
- Edie Lehmann – backing vocals (3, 4, 9)
- Amy Weston – backing vocals (3, 4, 9)
- Anna Pagan – backing vocals (5)
- Anita Sherman – backing vocals (5)

== Production ==
- Producers – Peter Bunetta, Rick Chudacoff and Bill Elliott.
- Executive Producers – Al Bunetta and Shingo Take
- Engineers – Csaba Pectoz (Track 1); Steve Zaretsky (All tracks).
- Assistant Engineers – Britt Bacon and Michael Franke (Track 1); Paul Ericksen, Mitch Gibson and Csaba Pectoz (Tracks 2–9).
- Mixed by Steve Zaretsky
- Design – Tommy Steele and Art Hotel
- Photography – William Warner

== Charts ==
Chart (1983/84)	Peak position
Australia (Kent Music Report)	95
Canada Top Albums/CDs (RPM)	30
US Billboard 200	49
