= La Toya (album) =

Studio album by La Toya Jackson
- Released: September 26, 1988
- Recorded: March 1987 – 1988
- Genres: Pop; R&B; new jack swing; freestyle
- Length: 45:31
- Label: RCA
- Producers: Full Force; Stock Aitken Waterman; Bobby Hart; Dick Eastman; Harold Faltermeyer; Steve Harvey

La Toya Jackson chronology
Imagination (1986)	La Toya (1988)	Bad Girl (1990)

Singles from La Toya
- 1. "(Ain't Nobody Loves You) Like I Do" Released: October 1987; 2. "(Tell Me) She Means Nothing To You At All" Released: 1988; 3. "You're Gonna Get Rocked!" Released: October 1988; 4. "You Blew" Released: 1988; 5. "Such a Wicked Love" Released: 1988

La Toya (also known as You're Gonna Get Rocked!) is the fifth studio album by American singer-songwriter La Toya Jackson, released in 1988 by RCA. While the cover and box states the album's name as La Toya, the actual disc and cassette tape state the name as You're Gonna Get Rocked!. Therefore, the album is interchangeably referred to by both names. The album includes "(Ain't Nobody Loves You) Like I Do" and "You're Gonna Get Rocked", which are, to date, two of only five songs by Jackson to have an accompanying music video. The album was re-released as an expanded 2-CD set under the name You're Gonna Get Rocked! by Cherry Pop Records in December 2013.

== Background ==
La Toya was the first album La Toya Jackson released since terminating father Joe Jackson as her manager and signing with a new label, RCA. Jackson's musical goal was to evolve her teen pop sound to something more substantial. "I know what I wanted to do, I always wanted a street sound. Michael kept saying 'Do it, move away, do your own sound.' That's why I moved to New York, to stop living in a fantasy world, get out of my sheltered life. As far as I'm concerned, it's my first album."

To help develop her sound Jackson recruited British producers Stock Aitken Waterman. Jackson was disappointed to find upon arriving at their studio that SAW had already completed their three submissions, requiring only Jackson's vocals. Jackson had hoped to collaborate with them from scratch. Producer Matt Aitken described working with Jackson as "great", but added: "She wanted to do it, but somehow I got a feeling she was doing it because she felt that she ought to; because she was part of the family. I'm not sure there was that drive there. You can't wring that out of people if it's not there."

"Just Say No" was composed for US first lady Nancy Reagan's anti-drug campaign of the same name. Their other two tracks, the "funky, gritty" "(Ain't Nobody Loves You) Like I Do" and melancholy ballad "(Tell Me) He Means Nothing to You at All" [sic] were starkly different from SAW's previous work.

Jackson waited six months for US hip-hop producers Full Force to fit her into their busy schedule. Jackson wanted them to contribute a more aggressive sound to the LP. At the time, Full Force member Paul Anthony disclosed that the group decided to work with Jackson because "we like the underdogs." The four Full Force tracks include "You're Gonna Get Rocked!", "You Blew", "Such a Wicked Love", and "Not Giving Up On Love."

Other contributions were from producers Bobby Hart & Dick Eastman on the duet with John Pagano "If I Could Get To You", Harold Faltermeyer on the eccentric "Turn On the Radio", and Stephen Laurence Harvey on "Does It Really Matter". La Toya was recorded from March 1987 through 1988. The album was mixed down in New York. As a result of working with such a varied group of producers, the LP's two sides had distinctly different sounds. Side A, containing tracks 1 through 5, had a hip-hop & breakbeat theme tailored for the US market, while Side B was more oriented towards European synthpop. Jackson had high expectations for the album, having worked on it for two years. "I've had no private life at all for two years. My whole life has been this record. It's hard work. It's not glamorous at all."

Jackson dedicated the album to the children of the world due to her involvement in the "Just Say No" campaign which was designated for children between the ages of 3 and 7. The album is available on Spotify under the title You're Gonna Get Rocked. It is Jackson's highest played album on the platform.

== Reception ==
Professional ratings
Review scores
Source	Rating
AllMusic	2.5/5 stars
NME	6/10 stars

The Miami News described the three "right on target" Stock Aitken Waterman songs as "pop gems that display Jackson at her best." "Just Say No" was commended as a "bouncy tune that glosses over" the anti-drugs slogan while AllMusic wrote that "Just Say No" brought "out the best of Jackson." David Quantick, writing in NME, lauded the LP's hip-hop side with Full Force "a-nicking and a-sticking in full sample effect." However Quantick slammed the SAW-produced tracks on Side B, characterizing "Just Say No" as Marvin Gaye's "What's Going On" rammed up the nose of ABBA's "I Have a Dream". The Miami News opined that pop "with a bit of funk and soul" best suited Jackson but criticized her voice as being drowned out on the Full Force songs. On the other hand, the San Jose Mercury News asserted that tracks "You Blew" and "Such a Wicked Love" "bristle with the torrid funk of Full Force." AllMusic described the Full Force tracks as "clever jams which position Jackson as a street-hip artist" but while also being "somewhat vacuous." "Does It Really Matter" was complimented as "a genuine, insinuating club/house cut."

== Track listing ==
No.	Title	Writer(s)	Producer(s)	Length
1.	"You're Gonna Get Rocked!"	Full Force	Full Force	5:03
2.	"You Blew"	Full Force	Full Force	4:55
3.	"Such a Wicked Love"	Full Force	Full Force	5:33
4.	"Not Giving Up On Love"	Full Force	Full Force	5:35
5.	"If I Could Get to You" (featuring John Pagano)	Dick Eastman, Bobby Hart	Eastman, Hart	4:13
6.	"Turn on the Radio"	Andi Slavik, Willi Orthofer, Hu Schnauer, David Cooke	Harold Faltermeyer	3:52
7.	"Just Say No"	La Toya Jackson, Jack Gordon, Stock Aitken Waterman	Stock Aitken Waterman	4:01
8.	"Does It Really Matter"	Jackson, Gordon, Linette McClellan, Phil Armstrong	Steve Harvey	6:03
9.	"(Tell Me) She Means Nothing To You At All"	Jackson, Stock Aitken Waterman	Stock Aitken Waterman	3:47
10.	"(Ain't Nobody Loves You) Like I Do"	Stock Aitken Waterman	Stock Aitken Waterman	3:49
Total length:				45:31

Expanded re-release by Cherry Pop Records CD1
No.	Title	Writer(s)	Producer(s)	Length
11.	"Trouble"	Steve Harvey	Harvey	4:05
12.	"You're Gonna Get Rocked!" (12" Remix)	Full Force	Full Force	7:19
13.	"Such A Wicked Love" (F.F. Remix)	Full Force	Full Force	5:54
14.	"(Ain't Nobody Loves You) Like I Do" (Extended Version)	Stock Aitken Waterman	Stock Aitken Waterman	7:23
15.	"Trouble" (Extended Version)	Harvey	Harvey	6:46

Expanded re-release by Cherry Pop Records CD2
No.	Title	Writer(s)	Producer(s)	Length
1.	"You're Gonna Get Rocked!" (U.S. 7" Radio Edit)	Full Force	Full Force	4:45
2.	"Such A Wicked Love" (F.F. Remix 7" Version)	Full Force	Full Force	4:18
3.	"(Tell Me) She Means Nothing To You At All" (Remix)	Jackson, Stock Aitken Waterman	Stock Aitken Waterman	5:02
4.	"(Ain't Nobody Loves You) Like I Do" (Original 12" Mix)	Stock Aitken Waterman	Stock Aitken Waterman	7:18
5.	"Just Say No" (Original Mix)	Jackson, Gordon, Stock Aitken Waterman	Stock Aitken Waterman	7:18
6.	"You're Gonna Get Rocked!" (7" Edit)	Full Force	Full Force	3:57
7.	"You Blew" (7" Edit)	Full Force	Full Force	3:20
8.	"Such A Wicked Love" (7" Edit)	Full Force	Full Force	4:32
9.	"Does It Really Matter?" (7" Edit)	Jackson, Gordon, McClellan, Armstrong	Harvey	5:02
10.	"You're Gonna Get Rocked!" (F.F. Hard-Core Mix)	Full Force	Full Force	5:01
11.	"(Ain't Nobody Loves You) Like I Do" (Instrumental)	Stock Aitken Waterman	Stock Aitken Waterman	3:48
12.	"(Tell Me) She Means Nothing To You At All" (Instrumental)	Jackson, Stock Aitken Waterman	Stock Aitken Waterman	3:45
13.	"You're Gonna Get Rocked!" (Dub)	Full Force	Full Force	7:36
14.	"Such A Wicked Love" (F.F. Remix Instrumental)	Full Force	Full Force	5:28
15.	"Trouble" (Instrumental)	Harvey	Harvey	4:04
16.	"(Tell Me) She Means Nothing To You At All" (Remix Instrumental)	Jackson, Stock Aitken Waterman	Stock Aitken Waterman	5:02
17.	"You're Gonna Get Rocked!" (Bonus Beats)	Full Force	Full Force	3:10

== Expanded re-release ==
The album was re-released as an expanded 2-CD-set under the name You're Gonna Get Rocked! by Cherry Pop Records in December 2013 including all of the remixes plus previously unreleased material, such as Jackson's version of the Nia Peeples hit single "Trouble" (originally recorded by Jackson), original versions of "(Ain't Nobody Loves You) Like I Do" and her anti-drug song "Just Say No". The 16-page booklet contains all the lyrics, additional information and a page written by Jackson herself. The re-issue was digitally remastered from the original tapes.

== Unreleased songs ==
A song called "Men Be Illin'" was originally recorded for the album, but not used. The song was recorded in early 1987 and copyrighted with the U.S. Copyright Office under the registration number PAu-986-950 on July 7 of that year. Jackson co-wrote the song with John F. Wilson, who she had previously worked with on the track "Love Talk" from her Imagination album in 1986. According to U.S. Copyright records, the song was simply recorded on a cassette tape and claimed by Jackson, while another Jackson/Wilson track entitled "I Really Want to Do It Tonight" was claimed by Wilson. Neither of the tracks were ever released on an album, although because of the dates of the recordings, it is widely believed that "Men Be Illin'" was intended to be released on Jackson's 1988 La Toya album.

Jackson also worked with Steve Harvey, whom she wrote songs with. One of the songs, "Does It Really Matter?", ended up on this album. She also originally recorded the Harvey penned song "Trouble", which was later given to Nia Peeples and became a No. 1 hot on the US Dance Charts. Jackson's version remained unreleased until December 2013, when it was added to the expanded re-release by Cherry Pop Records.
