= Imagination (La Toya Jackson album) =

Studio album by La Toya Jackson
- Released: March 1986
- Genre: Synth-pop, R&B
- Length: 31:02
- Label: Private-I; Epic
- Producer: Joe Isgro; Mike Piccirillo; Gary Goetzman

La Toya Jackson chronology
Heart Don't Lie (1984)	Imagination (1986)	La Toya (1988)

Singles from Imagination
- 1. "Baby Sister"; 2. "He's a Pretender"; 3. "Imagination"

Imagination is the fourth studio album by American singer-songwriter La Toya Jackson. The album was released on by Private-I Records (an extension of Epic Records).

== Album information ==
Private-I Records went bankrupt shortly after the album's release in 1986. Because of the record company's financial problems, the promotion was poor for the album and it failed to chart. Three singles were released, the first being "Baby Sister", which was released in Japan, followed by "He's a Pretender" and a remix of the title track. In November 2011, Funky Town Grooves announced that it would be issuing the Imagination album on CD for the first time, using the original master tapes as their source. The disc was released in February 2012 and featured four bonus tracks.

== Reception ==
Professional ratings
Review scores
Source	Rating
Allmusic	2/5 stars
The Baltimore Afro-American	3/5 stars

Billboard noted that the "singer's not toying around anymore, and no longer trades on her family sound. Bold break allows her own vocal stamp to filter through exotic, Euro-funk shadings, channeled through strong arrangements. "He's A Pretender" hasn't clicked, but "On A Night Like This" could pay off.

The Baltimore Afro-American described the album's production as "pop-oriented", "well recorded and mixed". The "new waveish" "Baby Sister" was complimented as "ear candy". Allmusic singled out "How Do I Tell Them" as having an "instantly memorable chorus and gripping rhythmic structure" but dismissed the rest of the album as "disposable".

== Track listing ==
Imagination
No.	Title	Writer(s)	Producer(s)	Length
1.	"He's a Pretender"	Gary Goetzman, Mike Piccirillo	Gary Goetzman, Mike Piccirillo	3:40
2.	"On a Night Like This"	Goetzman, Piccirillo	Goetzman, Piccirillo	3:28
3.	"How Do I Tell Them"	Goetzman, Piccirillo	Goetzman, Piccirillo	3:45
4.	"Imagination"	Amir Bayyan, Isidro "Cosa" Ross	Amir Bayyan, Isidro "Cosa" Ross, John Wilson	4:08
5.	"Baby Sister"	Goetzman, Piccirillo	Goetzman, Piccirillo	3:14
6.	"Weak Spot"	Belva Haney, John Bokowski, Lorrin "Smokey" Bates	Goetzman, Piccirillo	3:58
7.	"Love Talk"	La Toya Jackson, John Wilson	John Wilson	4:49
8.	"Boys Got Somethin' Girls Ain't Got"	Marvin Morrow, Stephen Geyer	Goetzman, Piccirillo	4:00

Expanded Edition bonus tracks
No.	Title	Length
9.	"Imagination" (Hot Dance Mix)
10.	"Imagination" (Dub Mix)
11.	"Baby Sister" (Instrumental Version)
12.	"Imagination" (7" Remix)

"Baby Sister"
A sample from "Baby Sister", a single by La Toya Jackson.

== Charts ==
Chart (1986)	Peak position
US Cash Box Black Contemporary Top 75 Albums	61
