= (Ain't Nobody Loves You) Like I Do =

1987 single by La Toya Jackson

Single by La Toya Jackson

from the album La Toya
- Released: 1987
- Genre: Pop
- Length: 3:50 (Album version); 7:26 (12" version)
- Label: Teldec Records; RCA Records
- Songwriter(s): La Toya Jackson; Stock Aitken & Waterman
- Producer(s): Stock Aitken Waterman

La Toya Jackson singles chronology
| "Oops, Oh No!" (1987) | "(Ain't Nobody Loves You) Like I Do" (1987) | "(Tell Me) She Means Nothing To You At All" (1988) |

"(Ain't Nobody Loves You) Like I Do" is a 1987 single by American singer La Toya Jackson. The song is taken from her fifth album, La Toya. It is one of only four songs by Jackson to have an accompanying music video. The song features a bridge sung by Mike Stock. The single was released in 1987 throughout Europe, excluding the United Kingdom. Despite being produced by the European trio Stock Aitken Waterman, who were big hit-producers at the time, the single failed to chart. The B-side of the single, "(Tell Me) She Means Nothing To You At All", was released as its own single in France. The 12" singles include a longer version of the song.

== Background ==
However, the single did fairly well on the German DJ charts. It debuted at No. 17 and stayed on the charts for several months. She also performed the song on the German television show Die Verflixte Sieben (with Rudi Carrell). The music video for the single was given little airplay and was never released on video or DVD. It didn't surface on the internet until March 2007. The Miami News described the number as "so unlike anything Stock Aitken and Waterman have produced that it seems a mistake to see their names on the credits. 'Like I Do' is funky, gritty and doesn't repeat every other verse 25 times."

== Music video ==
A music video was filmed and released to promote the single. The clip is similar to Jackson's 1983 music video "Heart Don't Lie" in its colourful, cartoon-like cinematography and dance routines. The video can be found on YouTube and on various Jackson fan Web sites.

== Versions ==
- Album version – 3:50
- 12" version – 7:26
