= Heart Don't Lie (song) =

Single by La Toya Jackson

from the album Heart Don't Lie
- Released: 1984
- Recorded: 1983
- Genre: Pop; reggae
- Length: 3:23 (Single version)
- Label: Epic; Private-I Records
- Songwriters: Amir Bayyan; Donna Johnson; La Toya Jackson
- Producer: Amir Bayyan

La Toya Jackson singles chronology
"Bet'cha Gonna Need My Lovin'" (1983)	"Heart Don't Lie" (1984)	"Hot Potato" (1984)

"Heart Don't Lie" is a song by American singer La Toya Jackson. The song is the second single from her album Heart Don't Lie. It is a duet with singer Howard Hewett, although he does not appear in the music video. Musical Youth and Janet Jackson provide background vocals for the track. The single peaked at number 56 on the US Billboard Hot 100 chart, becoming Jackson's highest charting song ever in the US. It also peaked at number 29 on the US Billboard Hot Black Singles chart.

== Release ==
A 7-inch single was released with the track "Without You" for a B-side; the 12-inch maxi single included a Club Version and Dub Version.

== Music video ==
"Heart Don't Lie" was La Toya Jackson's first single to have an accompanying music video. It was directed by Ed Pacio in February 1984 in Los Angeles, California. The music video features Jackson in a very colorful high school setting. The clip utilizes Carnival masks designed by Joseph McLaughlin. It also features the Mums, a trio of jugglers and magicians that included Albie Selznick. "Heart Don't Lie" was one of the subjects of VH1's "Pop-Up Video" in 1997.

== Performances ==
Jackson performed "Heart Don't Lie" on the 30 June 1984 episode of American Bandstand. The number was also performed on the August 25, 1984 episode of Solid Gold along with Hewett. The track appeared in Jackson's advert for Nikon cameras.

== Versions ==
- Album version – 4:37
- 7-inch version – 3:36
- Club version – 5:58
- Dub version – 4:37

== Charts ==
Chart (1984)	Peak position
Billboard Hot 100	56
Billboard Hot Black Singles	29
US Cash Box Top 100	57
US Cash Box Black Contemporary Singles	30

== Personnel ==
- Duet vocals by La Toya Jackson and Howard Hewett (uncredited)
- Background vocals by Musical Youth and Janet Jackson
