= Such a Wicked Love =

1988 single by La Toya Jackson

Single by La Toya Jackson

from the album La Toya
- B-side: "Does It Really Matter"
- Released: 1988
- Genre: Breakbeat; hip hop
- Length: 5:33
- Label: Teldec Records; RCA Records
- Songwriters: Curt Bedeau; Gerry Charles; Hugh L. Clarke; Brian George; Lucien George; Paul George
- Producer: Full Force

La Toya Jackson singles chronology
"You're Gonna Get Rocked!" (1988)	"Such a Wicked Love" (1988)	"You Blew" (1988)

"Such a Wicked Love" is a song by American singer La Toya Jackson from her fifth album La Toya. A remix, produced by hip-hop production team Full Force, was released on a 12" single in the U.S. The album track "Does It Really Matter" was included as a B-side.

To promote the single, Jackson set up a hotline where fans could phone in to hear the song. Jackson's hotline, an early form of podcasting, reached 20,000 listeners per day.

Jackson debuted "Such a Wicked Love" on "Bob Hope's Easter Vacation in the Bahamas", screened on March 25, 1989. Broadcaster NBC's Standards and Practices department censored Jackson's performance, deeming her dance moves "too prurient" for prime time television.

Jackson performed the song in Puerto Vallarta for Mexican television and in Caracas for the Venezuelan television program "Only For Men" in March 1989. The number was also part of her September 1989 Sizzling Spectacular concert on pay-per-view at Bally's Reno.

== Versions ==
- "Such A Wicked Love" Album version – 5:33
- "Such A Wicked Love" Single version
- "Such A Wicked Love" 7" version – 4:16
- "Such A Wicked Love" (F.F. Remix) 5:32
- "Such A Wicked Love" (Full Force Remix Instrumental) 5:32
