= Let's Rock the House =

Single by La Toya Jackson

from the album No Relations
- Released: 1992
- Genre: Pop; Dance
- Length: 3:26
- Label: Hype (1992)
- Producer(s): Menace

La Toya Jackson singles chronology
"Sexbox" (1991)	"Let's Rock the House" (1992)	"I Can't Help Myself" (1995)

"Let's Rock the House" is a song by American singer La Toya Jackson. It is taken from her 1991 album No Relations. It was released as a single on 12" and CD formats with club remixes, and was released on the heels of Jackson's previous single, "Sexbox".

== Track listing ==
- Album Version
- Radio Mix
- DigiTrax Mix
- Electrochic Mix
- J. Jordan Dub
