= Free the World =

Single by La Toya Jackson

from the EP Starting Over
- Released: January 2005
- Genre: Pop
- Length: 3:43
- Label: Ja-Tail Records
- Songwriter(s): Jeffré Phillips; La Toya Jackson; Peter Roberts
- Producer(s): Jeffré Phillips

La Toya Jackson singles chronology
"Just Wanna Dance" (2004)	"Free the World" (2005)	"Home" (2009)

"Free the World" is a single by American singer La Toya Jackson. Jackson spent six years in seclusion after divorcing her abusive late ex-husband and manager, Jack Gordon, in 1997. After her years in exile, the September 11th attacks inspired Jackson to write "Free the World". She recorded and performed it for friends, who immediately fell in love with it.

This song led Jackson to begin work on her Startin' Over album, which included "Just Wanna Dance" as the lead single. "Free the World" was released as a follow-up and charted in March 2005. The single peaked at #24 on the Billboard Hot Dance Club Play charts.

The song is an appeal to free the world from segregation, discrimination and years of war. VH1 described the ballad as the "most appropriate song for the world." About.com dubbed Jason Randolph's remix a "trippily hypnotic treat" with a "churning rhythm track and mesmerizing synth."

== Chart ==
Chart (2005)	Peak position
U.S. Billboard Hot Dance Club Songs	24

== Track listings ==
US promotional CD

- Extended House Mix
- Radio Remix
- Dub Mix
- Album Version
- Original Album Remix

US 12" vinyl #TOY2

- "Free The World" (Radio Remix)
- "Free The World" (Dub)
- "Free The World" (Extended House Mix)
