= Citizen Jane (book) =

1999 non-fiction book by James Dalessandro

- First edition cover
- Author: James Dalessandro
- Language: English
- Subject: True crime
- Genre: Non-fiction, mystery, thriller
- Publisher: Onyx Publishing
- Publication date: October 2, 1999
- Publication place: United States
- Media type: Print (hardback & paperback)
- Pages: 384 pp (first edition)
- ISBN: 0-451-40904-3
- OCLC: 42697903

Citizen Jane is a 1999 true crime non-fiction book by James Dalessandro about the real-life efforts of a woman to track down the con artist who murdered her aunt.

In 2009, the book was adapted into a Hallmark Channel film starring Ally Sheedy, Meat Loaf, Sean Patrick Flanery, and Nia Peeples.

== Plot summary ==
Jane Alexander was a sheltered, attractive widow living with her large, close-knit family in her small hometown of Truckee, California. For six years, she had been living with Tom O'Donnell, her charismatic and handsome boyfriend.

Gertrude McCabe, her favorite 88-year-old aunt, was gruesomely murdered in San Jose in 1983, a case that baffled San Jose PD. A break came from newly assigned police detective Jack Morris, whose investigative genius would soon solve the case. It was a difficult case to crack, but the motive was clearly something personal. McCabe was bludgeoned, choked with a bicycle lock, stabbed over two dozen times in her neck and back with a knife. Morris soon convinced Alexander that the killer was her boyfriend, and after O'Donnell disappeared with over $10,000 of her money and left her near bankruptcy, Alexander embarked on an epic journey to track down and outsmart the wily con artist. After 13 years of collecting evidence, Alexander and Morris managed to convict O'Donnell of first degree murder. Police believe O'Donnell killed Gertrude McCabe because Jane Alexander would then inherit her Aunt Gertrude's estate. O'Donnell was sentenced to life imprisonment; he died in 2010.

== Publishing history ==
James Dalessandro first read about Jane Alexander's story in the mid-1990s on the front page of the Pacific Sun in Marin County, California. Much of the research comes from detailed diaries that Alexander kept of the entire ordeal. David Mehnert contributed to the book after being in a private screenwriting class taught by Dalessandro.

The book was a #1 Amazon and national best seller in its Kindle/digital release in 2016 in true crime.

== Jane Alexander ==
Alexander, a grandmother of 12 at the time, actively contributed to Dalessandro's writing process.

She also founded the organization Citizens Against Homicide to help others solve the murders of their loved ones. CAH is now a nationwide organization, in all 50 US states, with more than 7,500 members. In 2006 she received the prestigious Minerva Award for her efforts. She died on December 14, 2008, at the age of 86.

At the time of her death, she was working on 500 open homicide cases and had helped solve more than 20 cold case murders, along with the help of Jan Miller, whose daughter Veronica was the victim of a still unsolved homicide.

== Film version ==
An adapted screenplay written by Dalessandro, and produced by Dalessandro and Larry Jacobson, was made into a Hallmark Channel film in 2009. Directed by Armand Mastroianni, it aired in September 2009. Alexander died while the film was in production. Cast members include:

- Ally Sheedy as Jane Alexander
- Meat Loaf as Detective Morris
- Sean Patrick Flanery as Tom O'Donnell
- Patty McCormack as Aunt Gertrude
- Nia Peeples as Evelyn
- Chuck McCann as Judge Thomas
- Jon Polito as Detective Romer
