= You and Me (La Toya Jackson song) =

Single by La Toya Jackson

from the album Bad Girl
- Released: 1990
- Recorded: 1990
- Genre: Pop; R&B
- Length: 4:32
- Songwriters: Antonio Bella; Davide Di DiGregorio; Gianni Bella; Jackson; Mary Jay Gay
- Producers: Ola Håkansson; Tim Norell; Anders Hansson

La Toya Jackson singles chronology
"Sexual Feeling" (1990)	"You and Me" (1990)	"Why Don't You Want My Love?" (1991)

"You and Me" is a single by La Toya Jackson, taken from her sixth studio album, Bad Girl. The song was originally titled Verso L'Ignoto, sung in Italian by Marcella and Gianni Bella, who entered the song in the annual Sanremo Music Festival held from February 28 to March 3, 1990. Jackson wrote English lyrics to the song and also performed it in the festival.

The single was released only in a 7" format, with the song "He's My Brother", a biographical track about brother Michael Jackson, as the B-side. An alternate single mix exists, but remained unused for unknown reasons.

Dutch-Croatian singer Tatjana covered the song in 1991. The single peaked at No. 81 on the Dutch charts.

== Chart performance ==
Chart (1990-1991)	Peak position
Italy (Italian Singles Chart)	28
Netherlands (Single Top 100); Tatjana version	81
