= Private Joy =

1981 song by Prince

Song by Prince

from the album Controversy
- A-side: "Do Me, Baby"
- Released: July 16, 1982
- Recorded: August 16, 1981
- Studio: Sunset Sound (Los Angeles, California)
- Genre: Post-disco; dance-pop
- Length: 4:25
- Label: Warner Bros.
- Songwriter: Prince
- Producer: Prince

"Private Joy" is a song by American musician Prince from his 1981 album Controversy, released as the B-side of the single "Do Me, Baby". The song describes how Prince will never reveal the identity of his secret lover. This is the first time Prince used the Linn LM-1 drum machine, which he would use throughout his career.

In this bouncy disco-pop number, Prince explains that his lover is no one's but his. He sings about what they do together, and the times they share. He claims that he "strangled Valentino", and that she was "his ever since" and that she "belongs to Prince".

The song ends with guitar riffs and feedback from Prince, and segues into "Ronnie, Talk to Russia", the next track on Controversy. These guitar sounds were sampled and used in "Orgasm", a song on Prince's 1994 album Come.

== Track listing ==
1. "Do Me, Baby" (edit) – 3:57
2. "Private Joy" – 4:25

== Personnel ==
Sourced from Benoît Clerc and Guitarcloud.

- Prince – lead and backing vocals, Oberheim OB-X, ARP Omni, electric guitar, bass guitar, Linn LM-1, Pearl SY-1 Syncussion

== La Toya Jackson version ==
"Private Joy"

Single by La Toya Jackson

from the album Heart Don't Lie
- Released: 1984
- Recorded: 1983
- Genre: Pop; R&B; soul; dance
- Length: 4:49
- Label: CBS; Sony Records
- Songwriter: Prince
- Producer: Amir Bayyan

La Toya Jackson singles chronology
"Hot Potato" (1984)	"Private Joy" (1984)	"Baby Sister" (1985)

American singer La Toya Jackson covered this song for her 1984 album Heart Don't Lie. Her single had limited release in Japan as a 7-inch single. Her US hit single "Heart Don't Lie" can be found on the B-side.

According to Jackson, Prince's publishing company, Controversy Music, "approached me about recording songs of his that hadn't gone over too big the first time around. They submitted several songs and I picked 'Private Joy' because it sounded so up-to-date." Though "Private Joy" was Jackson's favorite song from Heart Don't Lie, it was never released as a single outside Japan. Said Jackson at the time, "I loved the song and my record company loved it, but my father manages me and it was his decision to not release that cut."

The Los Angeles Times stated that "note for note, she matches Prince's intensity with her own hard-edged snap, crackle and pop."

=== Track listings ===
- Japan 7-inch single (#07 SP 815)
1. "Private Joy" – 4:51
2. "Heart Don't Lie" (7-inch) – 3:29

== Cheyne version ==
Artist Cheyne recorded a version for the soundtrack of the 1985 film Weird Science.

=== Track listings ===
- US 12-inch single (#MCA-23583)
1. "Private Joy" (extended version) – 5:30
2. "Private Joy" (instrumental) – 5:44
3. "Private Joy" (bonus beats plus bass) – 4:28
