= Just Wanna Dance =

Single by La Toya Jackson

from the EP Starting Over
- Released: 2004
- Genre: Pop; dance
- Length: 3:54 (radio edit)
- Label: Ja-Tail Records
- Songwriter(s): Jeffré Phillips; La Toya Jackson; Peter Roberts
- Producer(s): Jeffré Phillips; Peter Roberts

La Toya Jackson singles chronology
"Don't Break My Heart" (1998)	"Just Wanna Dance" (2004)	"Free the World" (2005)

"Just Wanna Dance" is a single by American singer La Toya Jackson. It is taken from her EP Startin' Over, which was released in 2011.

== Song information ==
After six years in seclusion after escaping an abusive relationship with late former husband and manager Jack Gordon, La Toya Jackson returned to the studio to record an autobiographical album entitled Startin' Over. "Just Wanna Dance" was recorded in 2002, but it wasn't until 2004 that it was released as Startin' Over's lead single.

Jackson began work on the song by visiting night clubs to hear what sort of music people were dancing to. To accomplish this, Jackson disguised herself as a male alter-ego named "Toy." As a result, the song's sexually ambiguous lyrics describe a ribald night out at a club where the party-goers "don't know if I'm a he or a she".

The single was initially released under Jackson's nickname Toy, so disc jockeys would give the record a fair chance before tossing it aside. To Jackson's satisfaction, the strategy worked. Jackson phoned DJs who had played her track to reveal "Toy's" true identity saying, "One phone call at a time, I am letting them know all about Toy. While some of them knew that Toy was me, others were surprised. The overall response has been rewarding and encouraging."

The single includes mixes by Vibelicious and Jason Randolph. About.com praised Randolph's "Extended Vocal" mix saying it had "a running synth line that could move anyone to the dancefloor." Jackson's vocals were complimented as "suit[ing] the sing-songy verses quite well." Outword Magazine called the track "energetic" and "infectious".

Although the single reached the #13 position on the United States dance chart in October 2004, a commercial release never followed, mostly because Jackson's record company, Ja-Tail Records, had not yet secured a distribution deal. A follow-up single, "Free the World", was released 5 months later. On the back of the singles' success, Ja-Tail obtained a distribution deal with Universal-Bungalo Records. A music video was reportedly planned, but during rehearsals Jackson's toe was broken when a microphone fell on it.

Jackson performed "Just Wanna Dance" for the first time on the grand finale of Mexican reality TV series La Academia on 18 December 2011.

== Official remixes ==
- "Just Wanna Dance (Radio Edit)" (3:54)
- "Just Wanna Dance (Vibelicious Radio Remix)" (4:38)
- "Just Wanna Dance (Randolph's Tribal Radio Remix)" (3:48)
- "Just Wanna Dance (Randolph's Dirty Radio Mix)" (3:55)
- "Just Wanna Dance (Vibelicious Club Mix)" (6:59)
- "Just Wanna Dance (Vibelicious Cyber Club Mix)" (8:08)
- "Just Wanna Dance (Randolph's Tribal Club Mix)" (9:41)
- "Just Wanna Dance (Randolph's Tribal Alternative Remix)" (9:54)
- "Just Wanna Dance (Randolph's House Dub)" (9:46)
- "Just Wanna Dance (Toy's Extended Vocal)" (9:54)
- "Just Wanna Dance (Toy's Dub)" (9:46)
