= Why Don't You Want My Love? =

Single by La Toya Jackson

from the album Why Don't You Want My Love?
- Released: 1991
- Genre: Pop; R&B; soul; dance
- Length: 5:07
- Label: BCM Records
- Producer: Peter Columbus

La Toya Jackson singles chronology
"You and Me" (1990)	"Why Don't You Want My Love?" (1991)	"Sexbox" (1991)

"Why Don't You Want My Love?" is a single by American singer La Toya Jackson. After recording her sixth studio album Bad Girl, which would be distributed in 1991, Jackson signed a deal with BCM Records in Germany.

The song was intended to be the lead single for a new album under the BCM label, but the company went bankrupt before the album could be completed. "Why Don't You Want My Love?" was originally scheduled for a release in fall 1990 but was delayed several times until its release in January 1991. The single was released in Germany, Austria and Switzerland.

BCM started a print campaign for the CD single, advertising it with the caption "A fresh new start with BCM". A short message for DJs is included at the end of the CD single, with Jackson's voice asking, "Now DJs, why don't you want my love?".

The single was released on 7", 12" and CD formats, but failed to reach the charts. In 1993, the song was licensed to the German label "Legend", who released a remix of the song along with the 12 tracks from Jackson's Bad Girl album. The compilation was titled Why Don't You Want My Love?.

Jackson quickly signed a new record deal with Pump Records in the Netherlands and released a new single and album only 10 months later.

== Track listings ==
1. Why Don't You Want My Love? (Radio Version)
2. Why Don't You Want My Love? (Original Version)
3. Why Don't You Want My Love? (Bruce Forest Remix)
4. Why Don't You Want My Love? (Instrumental Remix - Hot Mix D.J. Drop In)
