= Trouble (Nia Peeples song) =

1988 single by Nia Peeples

- 12" single

Single by Nia Peeples

from the album Nothin' But Trouble
- Released: 1988
- Recorded: 1987
- Genre: Dance
- Length: 6:28
- Label: Mercury
- Producer(s): Steve Harvey

Nia Peeples singles chronology
"Trouble" (1988)	"High Time" (1988)

Trouble is a 1988 single by singer/actress Nia Peeples, taken from the album Nothin' But Trouble. The single reached #71 on the Hot Black singles chart and #35 on the Hot 100 singles chart. The song was most successful on the dance chart reaching #1 for one week in early summer 1988.

== La Toya Jackson version ==
"Trouble"
- Remix cover

Single by La Toya Jackson
- Released: September 22, 2015
- Recorded: 1987
- Label: JRED Music, Vibe On
- Songwriter(s): Steve Harvey

La Toya Jackson singles chronology
"Feels Like Love" (2014)	"Trouble" (2015)

La Toya Jackson originally recorded "Trouble" in the late summer of 1987, but it was not included on her subsequent album, La Toya. In December 2013, Cherry Pop Records released Jackson's version of "Trouble" on an expanded 2-CD version of the album called You're Gonna Get Rocked!.

In 2015, JRED Music and Vibe On Records released "Trouble" as a single with remixes by six different artists. The single was released to digital music retailers and on CD. A megamix was included exclusively on the CD format.

=== Track listing ===
No.	Title	Length
1.	"Trouble (Jared Jones Radio Mix)"	3:45
2.	"Trouble (Matt Pop Radio Mix)"	3:30
3.	"Trouble (Ranny's Big Room Edit)"	4:05
4.	"Trouble (Sweet Team Radio Edit)"	3:48
5.	"Trouble (Jared Jones Club Mix)"	5:48
6.	"Trouble (Matt Pop Club Mix)"	7:32
7.	"Trouble (Ranny's Big Room Mix)"	6:32
8.	"Trouble (Sweet Team Mix)"	7:36
9.	"Trouble (Dr. Brooks Future RetroFunk)"	4:41
10.	"Trouble (Argonaut Remix)"	5:29
11.	"You're Gonna Get Rocked! Again (Megamix)" (Only available on the CD version)
