= Better on the Other Side =

2009 song tribute to Michael Jackson

Single by the Game and DJ Khalil featuring Chris Brown, Diddy, Usher, Boyz II Men, Mario Winans and Polow da Don
- Released: July 18, 2009
- Recorded: June 25–26, 2009
- Genre: Hip hop; R&B; pop
- Length: 4:36
- Label: BWS, Geffen
- Songwriter: Jayceon Taylor
- Producers: DJ Khalil, Jim Jonsin and Game

The Game singles chronology
"The Future" (2008)	"Better on the Other Side" (2009)	"Caillra For Life" (2011)

Chris Brown singles chronology
"Work That!" (2009)	"Better on the Other Side" (2009)	"Drop It Low" (2009)

Usher singles chronology
"Trading Places" (2008)	"Better on the Other Side" (2009)	"Papers" (2009)

Music video
- "Better on the Other Side" on YouTube

"Better on the Other Side" is a tribute song from American recording artists The Game, Chris Brown, Diddy, DJ Khalil, Polow da Don, Mario Winans, Usher and Boyz II Men dedicated to Michael Jackson. The song was recorded on June 25, 2009, after being notified that Jackson had died that day, and subsequently released the following day on Diddy's Twitter account. The song gained airplay on radio show "Big Boy's Neighborhood" as well as on Game affiliate DJ Skee's satellite radio show, "Skeetox". The song's lyrics are about Jackson's influence and effect on people worldwide, as well as the recording artist reflecting on their memories of Jackson.

Musically, "Better on the Other Side" is a hip hop, R&B, pop ballad. The song's music video was recorded in ten hours and was released on June 30, 2009. The video was intercut with clips of Jackson's fans mourning and celebrating Jackson outside the Ronald Reagan UCLA Medical Center, where Jackson was pronounced dead, as well as clips of the musicians recording the song. The song was well received by music critics.

== Background ==
On June 25, 2009, American recording artist, Michael Jackson, died from cardiac arrest at the age of 50, later revealed to be from a drug intoxication of the anesthetic drug Propofol (also known as "Diprivan"). Artists such as Chris Brown, Diddy, Boyz II Men and The Game. cited Michael Jackson as a respected and admired figure in the music industry. According to The Game, prior to Jackson's death Jackson, Diddy and Eminem had tried to end the feuding and tension between rapper 50 Cent and The Game in 2005. The Game stated that in 2005, Jackson called him and offered to help end the feud, remembering "I was on tour in Canada, sitting in my room, cutting my hair [...] I was messing my hair up. Then my road manager knocks on my door. Boom, boom, boom. He told me, I got MJ on the phone. I ran and snatched up the phone."

The Game said Jackson started the conversation by talking about music and complimenting him on his records like "Hate It or Love It" and "How We Do" and, "[Jackson] said, 'I don't know how you're gonna feel about this, but I want to ask you something. I don't want you to judge me, but I don't really know everything that's going on between you and 50 [Cent]. But I want to be the middleman behind you putting this situation to bed." Jackson had wanted the two to meet, with him serving as a mediator, though according to Game, "It never manifested."

== Composition ==
"Better on the Other Side" is a pop-ballad song that is four minutes thirty-six seconds long. The song's lyrics pertain to the influence of Jackson and his worldwide appeal and effect, as well as reflecting on their own personal memories of Jackson. The song instruments include a piano and a bass drop. "Better on the Other Side" opens with a piano-accompanied soundscape starts off with Diddy "testifying" about Jackson's influence with the lyrics, "I believed I can do anything," he says. "You made the world dance. You made the music come to life." Then a "thunderous bass drops" in, led by Brown's vocals on the chorus, "This the type of song that makes the angels cry/ Look up in the sky and I wonder why/ Why you had to go, go/ I know it's better on the other side." The song concludes with one last statement from Diddy, "People can say what they want about you. We gonna remember the miracles that you showed us. Through your music, through your dance. You were the one that made us realize that you are the world. Through us your legacy lives on, Mike Jackson."

== Recording and lyrical content ==
DJ Skee stated that after notifying Chris Brown and Usher and Boyz II Men, who at the time were in a recording studio, via a phone call, that they'd written and recorded the song overnight and gave him the song to play on June 26, 2009. "Better on the Other Sides"s lyrics pertain to the influence of Jackson and his effect on people worldwide, as well as reflecting on their own personal memories of Jackson. In the song's lyrics Diddy opens the song with Jackson's influence in the lyrics "I believed I can do anything," he says. "You made the world dance. You made the music come to life." Brown's part of the song is the chorus, where he described the grief of Jackson's death and noting that "I know it's better on the other side." On The Game's verses he reflects on Jackson's influence on him growing up and comparing himself to Jackson. Towards the ending on the song The Game claims that the feud between him and 50 Cent is over, presumably due to Jackson's death, "First thing I did when I heard was I called Puff. Cause him and Mike tried to stop the beef between us, Who was us? Me and fifty, that beef is dead, and the young Mike Jackson gonna take us to the ledge." After this line, Chris Brown then sings the chorus. Hinting that he is the "young Mike Jackson." However, their beef still continued until 2016, when it was squashed with 50 Cent saying "What happened, that shit was 12 years ago." The Outkast song Ms. Jackson is also referenced, referring to Jackson's mother, also saying "your son was our king so we won't Coretta you". Diddy concludes the song by stating that while people's opinions of Jackson may vary, that he's going to "remember the miracles that you showed us." through Jackson's music, dancing, and philanthropy commenting that "through us your legacy lives on, Mike Jackson."

== Release and critical analysis ==
Less than 24 hours after Jackson's death, "Better on the Other Side" was released by Diddy on his Twitter account. "Better on the Other Side" made its debut on the morning radio show "Big Boy's Neighborhood" as well as on Game affiliate DJ Skee's satellite radio show, "Skeetox." DJ Skee, said of being one of the first to give the song radio airplay, "I told Game yesterday that Michael Jackson died, and he didn't believe me. He said, 'I'll call you right back. Then this morning, he hit me with this track, and I immediately started blasting it out." "Better on the Other Side" was also released as a digital download. "Better on the Other Side" did not chart on any music charts from radio play or digital download sales. "Better on the Other Side" was received well by contemporary music critics. Rahman Dukes and Shaheem Reid, of MTV, described "Better on the Other Side" as a being a "heartfelt tribute". Billboard listed it among "The 16 Most Touching Tribute Songs".

== Music video ==
The music video to "Better on the Other Side" was released on June 30, 2009. The video was recorded and released within ten hours. The music video begins with clips of fans' tribute to Jackson outside the Ronald Reagan UCLA Medical Center, where Jackson was pronounced dead at. Shortly after Diddy's part of the song begins to play, the voice of Diddy, who isn't seen throughout the entire video, is heard. Clips shown in the being of the video show a young fan holding a poster that reads "R.I.P. Michael Jackson". From there are seen more images of fans, some mourning Jackson, some celebrating him by doing Jackson's signature dances and dressing like him. The Game begins rapping while lying in a bathtub, fully clothed and drinking as the water in the tub runs. Brown is shown moments after that, bobbing his head to the music. The video then goes back and forth between recording sessions for the song and tributes from Jackson's fans. The Game is shown in the studio with Brown, then we see Boyz II Men's Wanya Morris recording and singing his part on the record. We then see Game writing his rhyme for the song and, later, getting a new tattoo on his right arm. As the video ends, The Game stands up in the bathtub, takes off his shirt and reveals his new Michael Jackson tattoo. It is a picture of Jackson wearing a fedora and a mask on his face.

== Chart performance ==
Chart (2009)	Peak position
US Billboard Bubbling Under R&B/Hip-Hop Singles	13

== See also ==
- Death of Michael Jackson
- "Home" (La Toya Jackson song)

== Notes and references ==
=== Notes ===
a: The lyrics can be heard at the song's duration from 1:19 to 1:30.
