= Citizens Against Homicide =

Citizens Against Homicide (CAH) is a non-profit, public benefits organization based in California. The group supports the friends and relatives of homicide victims by honoring the deceased, advocating for families seeking criminal justice for the murders, and supporting crime legislation that keeps the citizenry safe. CAH was cofounded in 1994 by Jane Alexander, whose thirteen-year search for the murderer of her 88-year-old aunt inspired the book Citizen Jane, and Jan Miller, whose 19-year-old daughter Veronica was murdered in an unsolved 1984 case. By 1998, the group had become active in all 50 U.S. states and had a mailing list into the thousands. The group's membership actively assists the prosecution of murderers by writing letters to block the parole of convicted murderers and providing advice to families about the criminal justice system.
