= (Tell Me) She Means Nothing To You At All =

1988 single by La Toya Jackson

"(Tell Me) She Means Nothing to You At All"

Single by La Toya Jackson

from the album La Toya
- Released: 1988
- Genre: Pop
- Length: 3:47
- Label: RCA Records
- Songwriters: La Toya Jackson; Stock Aitken & Waterman
- Producer: Stock Aitken & Waterman

La Toya Jackson singles chronology
"(Ain't Nobody Loves You) Like I Do" (1987)	"(Tell Me) She Means Nothing to You At All" (1988)	"You're Gonna Get Rocked!" (1988)

"(Tell Me) She Means Nothing to You At All" is a 1988 single by American singer La Toya Jackson. Released in 1988, it was one of three songs Jackson recorded with British hitmaking producers Stock Aitken & Waterman. The song was co-written by Jackson and Stock Aitken & Waterman.

== Background ==
Tell Me was originally released as the b-side to her single "(Ain't Nobody Loves You) Like I Do". It was later released as a standalone single in France in early 1988, where it failed to chart. Both songs were later included on her fifth album, La Toya, released several months afterwards, in October 1988. The Miami News described the song as being a "pop gem" that displays "Jackson at her best."

The song's title has a typographical error. It was issued with the title "(Tell Me) He Means Nothing to You At All", but Jackson is clearly singing SHE on the song. This error was not corrected on the single, nor was it corrected on the "(Ain't Nobody Loves You) Like I Do" single, or on the La Toya album.
