= Bet'cha Gonna Need My Lovin' =

Single by La Toya Jackson

from the album Heart Don't Lie
- Released: 1983
- Genre: Pop; R&B; soul; dance
- Length: 4:28 (album version); 3:37 (single version)
- Label: Larc Records; Epic Records
- Songwriter(s): Amir Bayyan; Cynthia Huggins; Kelly Barreto
- Producer(s): Amir Bayyan

La Toya Jackson singles chronology
| "I Don't Want You to Go" (1981) | "Bet'cha Gonna Need My Lovin'" (1983) | "Heart Don't Lie" (1984) |

Alternative cover
- French 12" single

"Bet'cha Gonna Need My Lovin'" is a song by American singer La Toya Jackson and the first single from the 1984 album Heart Don't Lie. It was released on 7" and 12" singles without a B-side track, and peaked at No. 22 on the Billboard Hot R&B/Hip-Hop Singles & Tracks chart and at No. 55 on the Billboard Hot Dance Music/Club Play chart. Jackson performed "Bet'cha Gonna Need My Lovin'" on the June 30, 1984 episode of "Bandstand".

== Versions ==
- Album version – 4:28
- Instrumental version – 5:10
- Single version – 3:37
- Vocal Mix
- Special Radio Mix
- Special Radio Mix - Instrumental

== Charts ==
| Chart (1983) | Peak position |
|---|---|
| Billboard Hot Black Singles | 22 |
| US Disco Top 100 | 55 |
| US Cash Box Black Contemporary Singles | 34 |
