= Hot Potato (La Toya Jackson song) =

Single by La Toya Jackson

from the album Heart Don't Lie
- Released: 1984
- Recorded: 1983
- Length: 4:41
- Label: Epic
- Songwriters: Amir Bayyan; La Toya Jackson
- Producer: Amir Bayyan

La Toya Jackson singles chronology
"Heart Don't Lie" (1984)	"Hot Potato" (1984)	"Private Joy" (1984)

"Hot Potato" is a song by American singer La Toya Jackson, the third single from her third studio album Heart Don't Lie (1984). It peaked at number 43 on the Billboard Black Singles chart and at number 38 on the Billboard Hot Dance Music/Club Play chart. It also enjoyed time on the Billboard Heatseekers chart. It also peaked at number 92 in the United Kingdom. The single was released on 7" and 12" formats with the album track "Think Twice" as the B-side. Some singles also include a dub version.

== Performances ==
Jackson performed the song on "Solid Gold" which was broadcast on September 8, 1984. She also performed it on the U.S. TV show "The Fall Guy" broadcast on February 13, 1985, in the episode "Rock-A-Bye Baby".

== Versions ==
- Album version – 4:41
- 7-inch version – 3:51
- 12-inch version – 6:27
- Dub version – 5:59
- TV mix – 6:30

== Charts ==
Chart (1984)	Peak position
UK Disco Chart (Record Mirror)	25
UK Singles (OCC)	92
US Billboard Hot Dance Play Songs	43
US Billboard Hot Black Singles	38
US Cash Box Black Contemporary Singles	39
