= The Kid's American =

Single by Matthew Wilder

from the album I Don't Speak the Language
- B-side: "Ladder of Lovers"
- Released: January 1984
- Recorded: 1983
- Length: 3:45
- Label: Private-I; Epic
- Songwriter: Matthew Wilder
- Producers: Bill Elliot; Peter Bunetta; Rick Chudacoff

Matthew Wilder singles chronology
"Break My Stride" (1983)	"The Kid's American" (1984)	"I Don't Speak the Language" (1984)

"The Kid's American" is a song written and recorded by American singer-songwriter Matthew Wilder. It was released as the second single from his first studio album I Don't Speak the Language. "The Kid's American" peaked at No. 33 on the Billboard Hot 100 and is Wilder's second most-popular hit, behind "Break My Stride". It is also his second top-40 hit on the Billboard Hot 100. It is about celebrating youthful ambition, individuality, and the dream of making it big in America.

== Personnel ==
- Matthew Wilder – lead vocals, backing vocals, Prophet-10
- Bill Elliott – acoustic piano
- Dennis Herring – guitars
- Reggie McBride – bass guitar
- Peter Bunetta – drums
- John Gilston – Simmons drum programming and sequencing
- Jerry Peterson – baritone saxophone
- Lon Price – tenor saxophone
- Greg Prestopino – backing vocals
- Joe Turano – backing vocals
- Arno Lucas – backing vocals
- Leslie Smith – backing vocals

== Charts ==
Chart (1984)	Peak position
Belgium (Ultratop 50 Flanders)	28
Netherlands (Single Top 100)	24
UK Singles (OCC)	93
US Billboard Hot 100	33
US Cashbox	40
West Germany (GfK)	35
