= The Party Machine with Nia Peeples =

- Intertitle
- Genre: Dance-variety
- Created by: Arsenio Hall
- Presented by: Nia Peeples
- Country of origin: United States
- Original language: English
- No. of seasons: 1

Production
- Executive producer: Arsenio Hall
- Producer: Peter Wagg
- Production locations: Paramount Studios; Hollywood, California
- Production companies: Peeples Productions, Inc. Arsenio Hall Communications; Paramount Domestic Television

Original release
- Network: first-run syndication
- Release: January 7 – September 15, 1991

The Party Machine with Nia Peeples is a half-hour late-night American musical variety show that aired in syndication for one season in 1991. The show was hosted by Nia Peeples and executive produced by Arsenio Hall.

== History ==
=== Background ===
Arsenio Hall created The Party Machine as a televised afterparty to his own program, The Arsenio Hall Show, and to be a late-night alternative to Club MTV. Hall built the half-hour show around Nia Peeples, who previously hosted MTV's Friday night Street Party series and the short-lived US adaptation of Top of the Pops. The Party Machine set featured live music venues, multi-level dance floors, conversation pits, a VIP room, a non-alcoholic bar and a resident DJ. Music videos were introduced by Peeples, who also served as a dancer/choreographer. The show, sold to markets as a companion piece to Hall's talk show, aired weeknights in syndication beginning January 7, 1991 on approximately 150 stations. In addition to Club MTV, its format brought comparisons to Soul Train, Dance Party USA and American Bandstand.

=== Guests ===
Party Machine aimed to be a showcase for established and breaking urban dance acts. New Jack Swing singing group Troop was the show's first guest. Other music acts who performed on the show include Another Bad Creation, The Boys, Tevin Campbell, Taylor Dayne, Sheena Easton, En Vogue, Guy, LeVert, MC Hammer, Alexander O'Neal, Maxi Priest, Will Smith, Ralph Tresvant and Vanilla Ice. The show also featured comedians and actors such as Sinbad and David Faustino.

=== Ratings ===
Initially, ratings for Party Machine were solid and on several occasions beat Late Night head-to-head in Atlanta, New York, Detroit, Miami and Washington. Viewership gradually dipped, however, and in June the show was cancelled. The final episode aired on September 15, 1991.

== See also ==
- List of late-night American network TV programs
