= Home (La Toya Jackson song) =

Single by La Toya Jackson
- Released: July 28, 2009
- Recorded: 2002
- Genre: Pop; soul; R&B
- Length: 3:57 (short mix); 4:44 (album version)
- Label: Ja-Tail Records; Bungalo Records
- Songwriters: Jeffré Phillips; La Toya Jackson; Peter Roberts
- Producers: La Toya Jackson; Peter Roberts; Jeffré Phillips

La Toya Jackson singles chronology
"Free the World" (2005)	"Home" (2009)	"Feels Like Love" (2014)

"Home" is a sentimental ballad by La Toya Jackson which first appeared on the 2003 promotional copy her album Startin' Over. Jackson released the single on July 28, 2009 in dedication to her younger brother, Michael Jackson, who died on June 25. All proceeds will go to AIDS Project Los Angeles, one of Michael's favorite charities.

== Song information ==
"Home" is an autobiographical song describing life in the Jackson family and the closeness once shared among Jackson and her siblings. A press release describes the song as being "written with affection about her childhood memories and based on the premise that no matter where you are or what you are going through in your life, you can always go Home." It is notable for a bursting refrain reminiscent of the achingly climactic verse heard in Simon and Garfunkel's signature tune "Homeward Bound." The lyrics hint at Jackson's exile from the family in the early 1990s when she was under the control of abusive manager Jack Gordon. Jackson expresses remorse over the "many years that we let pass" having been "parted by the fame we grew to only know." The song alludes also to La Toya's affectionate pet name for Michael, "Joker."

== Release ==
"Home" was released on iTunes on July 28, 2009. The release was first announced on the website of Jackson's record label, Bungalo Records.

"Home" was originally not intended to be a single. A different song called "Love, Honor and Obey" was announced in March 2009 to be the lead single for Jackson's long-anticipated album, Startin' Over, which was completed in late 2008. In light of Michael Jackson's sudden death, Bungalo Records put it on hold in favor of releasing "Home" as a charity single in support of one of the singer's philanthropic causes.

La Toya Jackson insisted that "All the proceeds go to one of his organizations. One of the organizations I picked was the AIDS Project LA. When you download the song, "Home," on iTunes, I want every penny to there." She added, "It means a lot to me because, as you all know, my brother has given to so many organizations, and this is one of the organizations he's been giving to for over 10 years."

Bungalo president Paul Ring commented, "We felt that to move forward releasing La Toya's album as planned without recognizing Michael's tragic passing was inappropriate. After consulting with La Toya, we decided that both Bungalo and Ja-Tail Records would not earn any profit, but rather donate all of our time, energy, and proceeds to one of MJ's favorite charities, APLA. We feel that the song and La Toya are amazing and to be able to raise awareness and funds for this organization is exactly what Michael would have approved of!"

== Music video ==
Jackson filmed a music video, her first in over twenty years, on July 26, 2009 directed by Eric Bute with cinematography by Reed Smoot. The clip was shot at Disney's Golden Oak Ranch in Santa Clarita, California. The video was released online via iTunes on August 31, 2009. Access Hollywood officially debuted the clip on September 1, 2009. The video features Jackson both as a child and as an adult in various tributes to her late brother such as climbing trees, blowing bubbles and playing on a tree swing. As Jackson sits on the branch of a large oak tree, she can be seen holding a programme given out at the Michael Jackson's memorial service on July 7, 2009.

== See also ==
- Death of Michael Jackson
- "Better on the Other Side"
