= Starting Over (La Toya Jackson EP) =

EP by La Toya Jackson
- Released: June 21, 2011
- Recorded: 2002–2011
- Genre: Pop; dance
- Length: 24:38
- Label: Bungalo Records; Ja-Tail Records
- Producer: Jeffré Phillips; Peter Roberts; La Toya Jackson

La Toya Jackson chronology
Stop in the Name of Love (1995)	Starting Over (2011)

Singles from Starting Over
- 1. "Just Wanna Dance" Released: June 28, 2004; 2. "Free the World" Released: January 2005

Starting Over, also known by its working title Startin' Over, is a 2011 extended play by American singer La Toya Jackson. The EP contains two top twenty-five U.S. Billboard Dance Club hits; "Just Wanna Dance" and "Free the World". The autobiographical EP is described as the soundtrack to her memoir Starting Over.

== Conception and recording ==
Work on Starting Over began in 2001 when Jackson was moved to write "Free the World" in the wake of the September 11 attacks. The song's positive reception from friends spurred on Jackson to write more songs. The project was initially conceived as a 17-track LP titled Startin' Over. The album was completed in September 2002 and was to be released through Jackson's independent label Ja-Tail Records. It was issued as a promotional copy in 2003 in order to secure a distribution deal. In February 2005, it was announced that Ja-Tail Records had secured a distribution deal with Bungalo Records, but the project's official release was beset with delays for years.

In 2004, Jackson released "Just Wanna Dance", which peaked at number 13 on the U.S. Billboard Dance Club chart. In January 2005, she released "Free the World". The title track, "Starting Over", was recorded in 2006; the song was used as a jingle for Australian beverage maker Star Ice. In early 2007, Ja-Tail released "I Don't Play That", based on Jackson's experiences on the CBS reality series Armed and Famous. In 2009, Jackson released "Home" as a charity single to benefit AIDS Project Los Angeles. "I Don't Play That" and "Home" are not included on the EP.

The EP's title is a reference to the six years Jackson spent out of the public's view in order to rebuild her life after divorcing manager Jack Gordon. Starting Over includes autobiographical tracks about Jackson's relationship with Gordon. Several of them hint towards brutal beatings and plans to have her family killed. The opening track, "Mafia Style" is a reference to Gordon's meetings with mobsters on New York's Mulberry Street. According to Jackson, "I was hearing a whole lot that I probably shouldn't have been hearing. I was the only girl, and they called me 'the kid', because these were older men and they would say, 'Is the kid going to talk?' and [Gordon] would always say, 'No, the kid doesn't talk,' because I would always say, 'I know nothing about nothing.'"

== Release and promotion ==
Starting Over was digitally released on June 21, 2011 to online music retailers, to coincide with the same-titled book. The EP's title track was first previewed on Jackson's official YouTube channel at the end of May. A remix of "Starting Over" by Vibelicious was played during Jackson's Live and Uncensored Stickam event on July 31, 2011. She performed "Starting Over" on the September 4, 2011 episode of Mexican television series La Academia.

== Track listing ==
All tracks are written by Jeffré Phillips, La Toya Jackson, and Peter Roberts.

Starting Over
No.	Title	Length
1.	"Mafia Style"	0:49
2.	"Should've Left You"	3:27
3.	"No More Drama"	4:22
4.	"Don't Want You No More"	4:11
5.	"Free the World"	3:40
6.	"Just Wanna Dance"	4:18
7.	"Starting Over"	3:51
