= John Pagano (singer) =

- Born: Providence, Rhode Island, United States
- Genres: R&B, Pop
- Occupation: Singer
- Years active: 1980s - present
- Labels: MCA, JonVin Records

John Pagano is an American singer who had a national hit with "Shower You With Love" in 1990 and another with "Let's Get To It" in 1992. He has also sung with La Toya Jackson on her La Toya album.

== Background ==
John Pagano is a singer of Italian origin. He is originally from Providence in Rhode Island.

In 1990, Pagano had success with the single, "Shower You With Love" which was a hit getting to no. 50. Two years later in 1992, He had success with the single, "Let's Get to It" which was produced by Nick Mundy. The single was released on MCA MCA5P-2258 in 1992. It spent seven weeks in the Billboard R&B chart, peaking at No. 64.

Also in the early 1990s, Pagano's self-titled album was released. It included the hit "Let's Get to It" plus the song "Leaves of Love" which was co-written by Robin Sandoval.

Louil Silas Jr. of MCA Records described John Pagano as "a guy with the looks of Rob Lowe and vocals reminiscent of Jeffrey Osborne and James Ingram".

He has performed with Burt Bacharach and appears on the Burt Bacharach : A Life in Song Blu-ray which was directed by Richard Valentine, and produced by Cerrie Frost.

== Career ==
In 1988, Pagano dueted with La Toya Jackson on the song, "If I Could Get to You" which appeared on her La Toya album.

On January 27, 1990, "Shower You with Love" was released on MCA 53697. Credited to George Howard introducing John Pagano, it was written by Attala Zane Giles and Derrick S. Giles and produced by Attala Zane Giles. It was taken from Howard's 1990 MCA album, Personal. On the week ending February 17, "Shower You with Love" had also moved up from 41 to 35 on the Billboard Power Playlists chart (K97 section). It was at No. 92 on the Black Singles A-Z chart. On February 24, the song was at no 77. The following week on March 3, it was now in the Hot Black Singles chart at no. 65. The single peaked on March 31, at no. 50. It spent a total of eleven weeks in the chart.

In 1993, he had a hit with "The Best I Ever Was".

In 2014, Pagano was appearing with the Stockton Symphony for the Valentine Pops concert at the Atherton Auditorium at San Joaquin Delta College campus in Stockton on February 15 and 16.
