= Sexbox =

Single by La Toya Jackson

from the album No Relations
- Released: 1991
- Genre: Pop; R&B; soul; new jack swing
- Length: 4:02
- Label: Pump Records
- Songwriters: Menace; P Witte
- Producer: Menace

La Toya Jackson singles chronology
"Why Don't You Want My Love?" (1991)	"Sexbox" (1991)	"Let's Rock The House" (1992)

"Sexbox" is a single by American singer La Toya Jackson. It is taken from her 1991 album No Relations. The single was released on 7", 12" and CD singles in Germany, Austria, Switzerland and the Netherlands.

The single was released on Pump Records (a division of Dino Records) and a huge promotion campaign boosted the single in the Netherlands and Germany. The single charted at #23 on Dutch charts, and became Jackson's second biggest Dutch hit of her career.

Jackson performed the song on several German and Dutch TV shows accompanied by a group of Dutch dancers, including Gottschalk, NDR Talk-Show and Up'n Swutch. In Spain, Jackson performed the single on Jesús Hermida's television program along with her song "Playboy". At the same time she promoted the release of her autobiography La Toya: Growing up in the Jackson Family and her second appearance in Playboy in November 1991.

The track samples James Brown's "Get Up (I Feel Like Being a) Sex Machine." It also references Madonna's "Like a Virgin".

== Chart ==
Chart (1991)	Peak position
Netherlands (Single Top 100)	23

== Official versions ==
- Album Version – 4:02
- Album Version Instrumental – 4:02
- Radio Version – 3:57
- Extended Album Version – 7:22
- 12' Version – 7:14
- 12' Version Instrumental – 7:14
