= Nothin' But Trouble (Nia Peeples album) =

Studio album by Nia Peeples
- Released: August 30, 1988
- Recorded: 1987–88
- Genre: Dance-pop; R&B
- Length: 50:12
- Label: Mercury
- Producer: Steve Harvey; Howard Hewett; Doc Powell; Tony Prendatt

Nia Peeples chronology
Nothin' But Trouble (1988)	Nia Peeples (1991)

Singles from Nothin' But Trouble
- 1. "Trouble" Released: April 1988; 2. "High Time" Released: 1988; 3. "I Know How (to Make You Love Me)" Released: 1988

Nothin' But Trouble is the debut studio album by American singer and actress Nia Peeples. It was released on August 30, 1988, by Mercury Records. Peeples decided to venture into the music industry after she came to recognition as a regular cast in the musical television series Fame. She worked with Steve Harvey, Howard Hewett, Doc Powell and Tony Prendatt on the album. Musically, Nothin' But Trouble is a dance-pop and R&B album with influence of other popular genres at the time, such as freestyle and new jack swing.

Nothin' But Trouble did not receive positive reviews from music critics who compared Peeples' style to Paula Abdul and Janet Jackson. The album spawned one hit single with a track originally recorded by La Toya Jackson. It was not a commercial success as it didn't receive any certifications. It peaked at number ninety-seven on the Billboard 200.

Three singles were released from the album. The lead single "Trouble" peaked at number thirty-five on the Billboard Hot 100 and topped the Billboard Hot Dance Club Songs chart. The album's following singles "High Time" and "I Know How (to Make You Love Me)" were less successful but managed to peak into the Hot Dance Club Songs chart at number ten and twenty-eight respectively.

== Background ==
Another singer and Peeples' labelmate Vanessa Williams was also working on her debut album The Right Stuff (1988) at that time. She later commented that the label's focus was on Peeples because of her high-profile role on the television series Fame, so they invested their sales and marketing efforts in her album.

== Critical reception ==
Professional ratings
Review scores
Source	Rating
AllMusic	4.5/5 stars

Ron Wynn from AllMusic wrote: "Nia Peeples did a creditable job as an actress on the Fame television show, and later hosted a couple of short-lived music programs, including one produced by Arsenio Hall's company. But she never demonstrated on any project that she was a good singer, and her faults were glaring on this late-'80s work. Operating on the premise that they could make Peeples a second-level Paula Abdul, the producers gave her the same type of dance-pop bubblegum fodder, but didn't make it as hook-laden or catchy as Abdul's songs. The results were predictable."

== Track listing ==
No.	Title	Writer(s)	Producer(s)	Length
1.	"Trouble"	Steve Harvey	Harvey	6:28
2.	"High Time"	Harvey; Jean-Paul Maunick	Harvey	4:27
3.	"Star Crossed Lovers"	Harvey; Dianne Quander	Harvey	5:46
4.	"Be My Lover"	Clif Magness; Glen Ballard	Howard Hewett	4:23
5.	"Is This Really Love"	Hewett; Monty Seward	Hewett	4:28
6.	"Never Gonna Get It"	Monte Moir	Moir	4:19
7.	"This Time I'll Be Sweeter"	Gwen Guthrie; Patrick Grant	Doc Powell; Tony Prendatt	4:14
8.	"Poetry in Motion"	Clayton Savage	Moir	3:50
9.	"I Know How (to Make You Love Me)"	Nia Peeples; J. Paris	Harvey; Powell; Prendatt	6:56
10.	"For the Sake of Loving"	Steve Diamond; Sue Sheridan	Hewett	5:21
Total length:				50:12

CD bonus tracks
No.	Title	Writer(s)	Producer(s)	Length
11.	"Trouble" (12" Club Remix)	Harvey	Harvey; Shep Pettibone	7:20
12.	"I Know How (to Make You Love Me)" (Street Beat)	Peeples; Paris	Harvey; Powell; Prendatt	6:41
Total length:				64:13

== Charts ==
Chart (1988)	Peak; position
US Billboard 200	97
