= Bad Girl (album) =

Studio album by La Toya Jackson
- Released: January 23, 1990
- Recorded: 1989
- Genres: R&B; pop; dance
- Length: 49:22
- Label: Sherman Records
- Producers: Claudio Donato; Franco Donato; Ola Håkansson; Anthony Monn

La Toya Jackson chronology
La Toya (1988)	Bad Girl (1990)	No Relations (1991)

Singles from Bad Girl
- 1. "Bad Girl"; 2. "You and Me"; 3. "Sexual Feeling"; 4. "Why Don't You Want My Love?"

Professional ratings
Review scores
Source	Rating
AllMusic	2/5 stars

Bad Girl (recorded in 1989, released in 1990) is the sixth studio album by American singer-songwriter La Toya Jackson. The album was also released as He's My Brother, Sexual Feeling, Playboy (Be My), Why Don't You Want My Love? and Be My Lover.

== Album information ==
The album was recorded in 1989 under Teldec Records in Germany, and was supposed to be released in August 1989 under the title On My Own, featuring ten tracks. Disagreements between Jackson's management and Teldec Records caused a cancellation of the album. Sherman Records purchased the album, added two additional Jackson songs – "Sexual Feeling", recorded in Italy, and "You And Me", recorded in Sweden – retitled the album Bad Girl, and finally released it in 1990. Since then the recording has been licensed to countless small record labels, who have released the album under many different titles. Some issues of the albums exclude the tracks "Do the Salsa" or "Piano Man".

The Bad Girl album is one of the few albums in Jackson's back catalogue that is still in print today, and it continues to be re-released under many different covers and names. The album is among her most well known due to its wide availability.

Jackson performed the title song, "Bad Girl", on four German TV shows, including the ZDF Fernsehgarten and NDR Talk-Show. One performance is a clip that utilized blue-screen effects and therefore is often mistaken by people today as an official video clip produced by Jackson's record company. Jackson also performed the song at her 1989 concert at Bally's Reno, A Sizzling Spectacular!.

The track Playboy (Be My) has been incorrectly titled Playboy (Be Me) on some reissues of this album. It was re-recorded in 1991 for La Toya's album No Relations as "Be My Playboy".

The song "He's My Brother" is a tribute to her brother Michael Jackson, it contains a sample of the song "Bad".

== Various issues ==
=== Deluxe version ===
A Deluxe version was released in 2015 by Vibe On Records and contains 21 bonus tracks.

=== Retro Music issue ===
The album issued in 1995 by Retro Music, a Canadian label, only contains 10 of the 12 original tracks. However, it is still in print and publicly accessible due to its widespread release, and can be found on most major online retailers.

=== Why Don't You Want My Love? ===
A rare German issue of Bad Girl, released in 1993 by the Legend label, was titled Why Don't You Want My Love? and featured the 12 tracks from Bad Girl plus an extra track called "Why Don't You Want My Love? (Bruce Forest Remix)". A single for the track was released on BCM Records and was intended for an all-new album. However, the record label wasn't able to complete the album and this was the only track that ever surfaced. Legend bought the rights to the song and included it with the tracks from Bad Girl.

== Track listing ==
No.	Title	Writer(s)	Producer(s)	Length
1.	"Sexual Feeling"	Alberto Boi, Claudio Donato, Frank Moiraghi, La Toya Jackson	Claudio Donato, Franco Donato	5:22
2.	"You and Me"	Antonio Bella, Davide Di DiGregorio, Gianni Bella, Jackson, Mary Jay Gay	Ola Håkansson	4:32
3.	"He's My Brother"	Anthony Monn, Jackson, Jack Gordon	Anthony Monn	3:41
4.	"Restless Heart"	Irmgard Klarmann, Felix Weber	Anthony Monn	3:38
5.	"Playboy (Be My)"	Andi Slavik, Monn, Jackson, Gordon, Shane Dempsey	Anthony Monn	4:14
6.	"You Can Count on Me"	Roxanne Shanté, Marlon Williams	Anthony Monn	3:57
7.	"Somewhere"	Bobby Sandstrom, Michael Price, Richard Scher	Anthony Monn	3:25
8.	"Bad Girl"	Klarmann, Weber	Anthony Monn	4:03
9.	"Be My Lover"	Slavik, Charlie Woodward, Shane Dempsey	Anthony Monn	4:22
10.	"He's So Good to Me"	Klarmann, Weber	Anthony Monn	3:41
11.	"Do the Salsa"	Monn, Jackson, Gordon, Slavik	Anthony Monn	4:08
12.	"Piano Man"	Klarmann, Weber	Anthony Monn	4:19

== Deluxe version track listing ==
Disc one
No.	Title	Length
1.	"Sexual Feeling" (Rapsody version)
2.	"You and Me"
3.	"He's My Brother"
4.	"Restless Heart"
5.	"Playboy"
6.	"You Can Count on Me"
7.	"Somewhere"
8.	"Bad Girl"
9.	"Be My Lover"
10.	"He's So Good to Me"
11.	"Do the Salsa"
12.	"Piano Man"
13.	"Why Don’t You Want My Love?" (original version)
14.	"Sexual Feeling" (vocal version)
15.	"He's My Brother" (extended)
16.	"Bad Girl" (12″ version)
17.	"Why Don’t You Want My Love?" (Bruce Forest remix)

Disc two
No.	Title	Length
1.	"Sexual Feeling" (La Toya remix; radio version)
2.	"You and Me" (edit/backing vox up)
3.	"Playboy" (edit version)
4.	"Why Don’t You Want My Love?" (radio version)
5.	"Bad Girl" (N.Y. – Munich House mix)
6.	"Sexual Feeling" (La Toya remix)
7.	"Why Don’t You Want My Love?" (Bruce Forest edit)
8.	"Sexual Feeling" (sex vocal)
9.	"Sexual Feeling "La Toya" Remix" (a cappella)
10.	"Sexual Feeling "La Toya" Remix" (instrumental)
11.	"You and Me" (TV track)
12.	"Why Don’t You Want My Love?" (instrumental remix)
13.	"Sexual Feeling" (Rigger's Horizon remix)
14.	"Bad Girl Album Megamix"
15.	"Bad Girl Ballads Medley"
16.	"Hot Mix DJ Drop-In"

== Singles ==
- "Bad Girl" (1989)
- "Sexual Feeling ('La Toya' Remix)" (1990)
- "You and Me" (1990)
