= No Relations =

Studio album by La Toya Jackson
- Released: 1991
- Genre: Pop; dance
- Length: 45:59
- Label: Pump Records, Warner Music
- Producer: Menace; John Bartels; Victor Franco; Damon Rochefort; Tony Monn; Marc Harman

La Toya Jackson chronology
Bad Girl (1990)	No Relations (1991)	Formidable (1992)

Singles from No Relations
- 1. "Sexbox"; 2. "Let's Rock the House"; 3. "Wild Side"

Professional ratings
Review scores
Source	Rating
AllMusic	2.5/5 stars

No Relations is the seventh studio album by American singer La Toya Jackson. The album was released in 1991 shortly after La Toya's autobiography, La Toya: Growing Up in the Jackson Family, was published. The album was only released in Spain, Colombia, Germany and the Netherlands, but was imported throughout Europe and the rest of the world.

== Album information ==
The song "Sexbox" was released as a single in Europe, peaking at #25 in the Netherlands, her second biggest hit there. "Let's Rock the House" was subsequently released to no success, and "Wild Side" also saw a release as a promotional single in the Philippines.

"Be My Playboy", a song already recorded for Jackson's Bad Girl album, is included here in one of its original demos. A proper remix produced by Menace, a European production team who produced most of this album, was originally intended to be included on the album and released as a single; for unknown reasons, the remix was replaced by one of the original demos. The album also includes a rendition of "Reggae Nights", a Grammy-nominated song originally written by Jackson for reggae artist Jimmy Cliff.

== Track listing ==
No Relations track listing
No.	Title	Producer(s)	Length
1.	"Sexbox"	Menace	4:02
2.	"Wild Side"	Menace	6:15
3.	"Submission"	John Bartels	4:08
4.	"Reggae Nights"	John Bartels	4:08
5.	"Could This Be Love We're Making"	Victor Franco	4:00
6.	"To Prove My Love"	Damon Rochefort	3:56
7.	"Times Are Changing"	Damon Rochefort	3:59
8.	"Be My Playboy"	Anthony Monn	4:43
9.	"Let's Rock the House"	Marc Hartman, Micro Mania	3:26
10.	"Sexbox" (album version)	Menace	7:22
