= You're Gonna Get Rocked! (song) =

1988 song by La Toya Jackson

Single by La Toya Jackson

from the album La Toya
- Released: 1988
- Genre: Breakbeat; hip hop; pop
- Length: 3:55 (Single version); 5:00 (Album version)
- Label: Teldec Records; RCA Records
- Songwriters: Curt Bedeau; Gerry Charles; Hugh L Clarke; Brian George; Lucien George; Paul George
- Producer: Full Force

La Toya Jackson singles chronology
"(Tell Me) She Means Nothing To You At All" (1988)	"You're Gonna Get Rocked!" (1988)	"Such a Wicked Love" (1988)

Alternative cover
- U.S. 12" Cover

"You're Gonna Get Rocked!" is a 1988 song by American singer La Toya Jackson, taken from her 1988 album La Toya. Released on March 27, 1988, the single, produced by popular hip hop hitmakers Full Force, was among her most successful songs.

== Song information ==
The single was released throughout the U.S., Europe, and Canada. It peaked at #66 on the Billboard Hot R&B/Hip-Hop Singles & Tracks chart, #90 in the United Kingdom, #82 in the Netherlands and #42 in New Zealand. The B-side of the single was the album track "Does It Really Matter".

"You're Gonna Get Rocked!" is the third of five songs by La Toya Jackson to have an accompanying music video. The clip was directed by Greg Gold and was released in October 1988. A huge promotion campaign followed in the fall of 1988, with Jackson performing the song live on many different TV shows worldwide. The track samples James Brown's "Funky President". The Miami News reviewed the song as having a "heavy future funk beat" that does "grind to a fierce rhythm track."

== Music video ==
The music video depicts Jackson as the head of a motorcycle gang. Clad in leather and rhinestones, Jackson cruises through an urban street on the back of a motorbike. She demands respect from the local street toughs and performs a dance number with the members of her gang. The edgy clip drew comparisons to her brother Michael Jackson's short film for his single "Bad."

== Notable live performances ==
Jackson performed "You're Gonna Get Rocked" on the German TV shows Eurotops and Extratour, on the Dutch program "Countdown", in Caracas for Venezuelan television, and in her September 1989 live pay-per-view concert at Bally's Reno. It was also performed on the Chilean TV Program Porque hoy es Sábado where it was coregraphied by Hugo Urrutia, a well-known Chilean dancer.

== Charts ==
Chart (1988)	Peak position
New Zealand Singles Chart	42
Netherlands (Single Top 100)	82
UK Singles (Official Charts)	90
US Billboard Hot Black Singles	66
Belgium (Ultratop 50 Flanders)	35
US Cash Box Black Contemporary Singles	58

== Versions ==
- Album version
- Radio edit
- Single version
- 12" remix
- 7" edit
- Extended version
- Bonus beats
- Dub
- Full Force Hard-Core Mix
- Full Force "Get Busy" Mix
