= Heart Don't Lie =

Studio album by La Toya Jackson
- Released: February 17, 1984
- Genres: Reggae; dance; soul; R&B; funk
- Length: 37:01
- Label: Epic
- Producer: Amir Bayyan

La Toya Jackson chronology
My Special Love (1981)	Heart Don't Lie (1984)	Imagination (1986)

Singles from Heart Don't Lie
- 1. "Bet'cha Gonna Need My Lovin'"; 2. "Heart Don't Lie"; 3. "Hot Potato"; 4. "Private Joy"

Heart Don't Lie is the third album released by American singer-songwriter La Toya Jackson. Released in February 17, 1984 by Epic Records, it is her most commercially successful album to date, peaking at #149 on the Billboard 200 and #65 on the Top Black Albums chart.

== Album information ==
The album was produced by Amir Bayyan, brother of Khalis Bayyan and Robert Bell, and member of Kool & the Gang, who was hired after Joe Jackson, La Toya's father and then-manager, heard his tapes. Jackson recorded the album sporadically over a six-month period. The album features a plethora of musical guests, including Shalamar's Howard Hewett and reggae-pop group Musical Youth on the title track, musicians from Kool & the Gang on several tracks throughout the album, and collaborations with her siblings, including Marlon, Janet, and Tito, who co-produced the track "Frustration".

Jackson and Bayyan originally wrote the song "Reggae Nights" for this album, but it ended up being a Grammy-nominated single for Jimmy Cliff. Said Jackson at the time, "A lot of people wanted to sing that tune and we were thinking about saving it for my album. But when Jimmy came along I said, 'Forget it. I hear a guy doing it.' So he got the tune." She recorded the song herself for her 1991 album No Relations.

Heart Don't Lie was re-released by Funky Town Grooves on CD in February 2012. The expanded edition included 7 bonus tracks. As of January 2013, the album is once again out of print.

== Reception ==
Professional ratings
Review scores
Source	Rating
AllMusic	3/5 stars
Rolling Stone	1/5 stars
Smash Hits	7/10

In their review, Cashbox stated that "a prestigious solo debut is made by LaToya Jackson with her sultry new LP for Private I Records. “Heart Don’t Lie” is an album packed with top notch dance tunes, from the reggae tinged single “Heart Don’t Lie” to the partying trumpet funk of “Hot Potato.” Jackson’s singing has a satiny texture that gives these tunes a rich smoothness. Together with the instrumental excellence of a crack studio band, Jackson’s performance on this LP should win her the attention she deserves."

The Afro-American described the opening "Think Twice" as a "rocker" and compared "Hot Potato" to an Evelyn King song. The LP's A-side closes with a cover Prince's "Private Joy" with which Jackson, according to the Los Angeles Times "matches Prince's intensity with her own hard-edged snap, crackle and pop." Dave Marsh of Rolling Stone described the album as "the one Jackson record you don't hear on the radio", which, "given the all-encompassing aura of the phenomenon [...] ought to give you a strong sense of the banality of what's stored in this set of grooves. La Toya can carry a tune but she can't really project her voice, much less sell a song." Chris Albertson of Stereo Review said that "judging by [this album], producer Amir Bayyan is aware of her limitations—at least, that would account for his drowning her voice in some very strong, rhythmic arrangements. This is an eminently forgettable release."

AllMusic commented that there are "a handful of guilty pleasures here that are, if not much else, very catchy, making this a wise investment for anyone curious about the music of the Jackson family 'outcast'."

== Track listing ==
No.	Title	Writer(s)	Producer(s)	Length
1.	"Think Twice"	Amir Bayyan, La Toya Jackson	Amir Bayyan	4:41
2.	"Heart Don't Lie"	Amir Bayyan, Donna Johnson, La Toya Jackson	Amir Bayyan	4:37
3.	"Bet'cha Gonna Need My Lovin'"	Amir Bayyan, Cynthia Huggins, Kelly Barreto	Amir Bayyan	4:29
4.	"Private Joy"	Prince	Amir Bayyan	4:51
5.	"Hot Potato"	Amir Bayyan, La Toya Jackson	Amir Bayyan	4:41
6.	"I Like Everything You're Doin'"	Gregory Radford, Meekaaeel Muhammad	Amir Bayyan	4:36
7.	"Frustration"	Chuck Gentry, Howard Hewett	Howard Hewett, Tito Jackson	4:47
8.	"Without You"	Amir Bayyan, La Toya Jackson	Amir Bayyan	4:10
Total length:				37:01

=== Expanded edition ===
Bonus tracks
No.	Title	Length
9.	"Bet'cha Gonna Need My Lovin'" (Long Version)	6:18
10.	"Bet'cha Gonna Need My Lovin'" (Instrumental)	4:44
11.	"Heart Don't Lie" (Club Version)	5:59
12.	"Heart Don't Lie" (Dub Version)	4:37
13.	"Private Joy" (Extended Dance Mix)	7:56
14.	"Hot Potato" (12" Version)	6:27
15.	"Hot Potato" (Dub Version)	5:59

== Charts ==
Chart (1984)	Peak position
Billboard 200	149
Billboard Top Black Albums	65
US Cash Box Black Contemporary Top 75	51
