= Nia Peeples =

American singer, actress, and television host

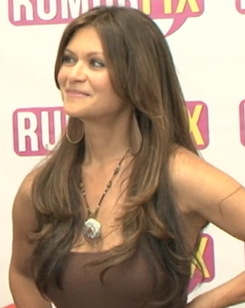
- Peeples in 2013
- Born: Virenia Peeples; December 10, 1961 (age 64); Hollywood, California, U.S.
- Occupations: Actress; singer
- Years active: 1981–present
- Television: The Party Machine with Nia Peeples; Fame
- Spouses: Guy Ecker (m. 1984; div. 1986) Howard Hewett (m. 1989; div. 1993) Lauro Chartrand (m. 1997; div. 2004) Sam George (m. 2007; div. 2015)
- Children: 2

Virenia Peeples (born December 10, 1961) is an American R&B and dance music singer and actress. Peeples is known for playing Nicole Chapman on the TV series Fame; Pam Fields on the drama Pretty Little Liars; Karen Taylor Winters on The Young and the Restless; Sydney Cooke on Walker, Texas Ranger; and as Grace's mom, Susan, on The Fosters.

== Early life ==
Peeples was born December 10, 1961, in Hollywood, California, the daughter of Elizabeth Joan (née Rubic), a flamenco dancer, and Robert Eugene Peeples. She was raised in West Covina. Her maternal grandparents were immigrants from the Philippines. Her father, who was originally from Mississippi, was of Scottish, English, and Irish ancestry.

== Personal life ==
She was married to surfer Sam George from 2007 to 2015.

She operates an internet based organization called Elements of Life, which promotes fitness, inspiration, healthy lifestyle changes and emotional well-being. She worked with business coach Amy Applebaum on its development.

In 2013, Peeples lost vision in her right eye due to trigeminal nerve damage.

== Career ==
=== Music ===
Peeples started her career as part of the performance group The Young Americans. In 1988 she hit #1 on the Hot Dance Music/Club Play chart with "Trouble", which climbed to #35 on the Billboard Hot 100. Her most successful pop single is "Street Of Dreams", which hit #12 on the Billboard Hot 100 in 1991. She made a music video in 1986 for "All You Can Dream", directed by Alan Bloom and conceptualized by Keith Williams, for the purposes of promoting the values of UCLA. On February 4, 2009, Peeples presented Debbie Allen with a Lifetime Achievement Award at The Carnival: Choreographer's Ball tenth anniversary show. Peeples also attends and performs at the annual live Fame Reunion concerts overseas.

Her most recent recording is a country song called "If You Want Me to Stay," released on July 3, 2013. Available on Nia Peeples' own YouTube account and streaming services.

=== Acting ===
Notably, Peeples portrayed performing arts student Nicole Chapman on the hit TV series Fame. In 1987, she was in the movie North Shore as Kiani. She also hosted the short-lived American version of Top of the Pops in 1987, a weeknight dance music program called The Party Machine with Nia Peeples, (1991), Return to Lonesome Dove (1993), and portrayed Texas Ranger Sydney Cooke in the CBS hit series Walker, Texas Ranger from 1999 to 2001. In 2004, she appeared in the Andromeda episode "The Spider's Stratagem", as arms smuggler and love-interest Rox Nava. Peeples joined the cast of The Young and the Restless in 2007, playing the role of Karen Taylor, and was released from the role in the spring of 2009. In 2010, she was cast in ABC Family's TV series Pretty Little Liars, based on the book series by Sara Shepard. Peeples was featured on the July 7, 2013 episode of Celebrity Wife Swap, in which she traded places with singer Tiffany.

== Discography ==
=== Albums ===
- Nothin' But Trouble (1988) – US #97
- Nia Peeples (1991)
- Songs of the Cinema (2007)

=== Singles ===
Year	Single	Peak chart positions					Album
Year	Single	US	US R&B	US Dan	AUS	CAN	Album
1988	"Trouble"	35	71	1	—	—	Nothin' But Trouble
1988	"High Time"	—	—	10	—	—	Nothin' But Trouble
1989	"I Know How (To Make You Love Me)"	—	—	28	—	—	Nothin' But Trouble
1991	"Street of Dreams"	12	73	—	74	23	Nia Peeples
1992	"Kissing the Wind"	76	—	—	86	76	Nia Peeples
1992	"Faces of Love"	88	—	—	—	59	Nia Peeples
"—" denotes a recording that did not chart or was not released in that territory.

== Filmography ==
=== Film ===
Year	Title	Role	Notes
1981	A Single Light	Deaf Girl	TV movie
1984	Fame	Nicole Chapman	Short
1987	North Shore	Kiani	
1989	DeepStar Six	Scarpelli	
1989	Swimsuit	Maria Detney	TV movie
1989	Nasty Boys	Serena Cruz	TV movie
1990	Perry Mason: The Case of the Silenced Singer	Cathy Redding	TV movie
1992	I Don't Buy Kisses Anymore	Theresa Garabaldi	
1993	Return to Lonesome Dove	Agostina	TV movie
1994	My Name Is Kate	Annie	TV movie
1994	Improper Conduct	Bernie	
1994	XXX's & OOO's	Sasha Townes	TV movie
1995	Deadlocked: Escape from Zone 14	Allie Thompson	TV movie
1995	Mr. Stitch	Dr. Elizabeth English	TV movie
1996	Terminal	Janet Reardon	TV movie
1996	Bloodhounds II	Nikki Cruise	TV movie
1997	Tower of Terror	Jill Perry	TV movie
1997	Odd Jobs	Assassin	TV movie
1998	Blues Brothers 2000	Lt. Elizondo	
1998	Poodle Springs	Angel	TV movie
1998	Heroes: The Mystique, the Movies, the Men	Special Guest Host	TV movie
2000	Alone with a Stranger	Beth Jenkins	
2000	The Riff	Heather Anderson	
2001	Bruised	Michelle	Short
2002	Half Past Dead	49er Six	
2002	The Chang Family Saves the World	Pearl Empress	TV movie
2005	Inside Out	Maria	
2005	Sub Zero	Kelli Paris	Video
2006	Connors' War	Amanda	Video
2006	Special Unit	Tara	TV movie
2006	House Broken	Ms. Hawkhauser	TV movie
2007	Arwin!	Ms. Hawkhauser	TV movie
2009	The Outside	Joanne Blakey	
2009	Citizen Jane	Evelyn	TV movie
2011	Battle of Los Angeles	Capt. Karla Smaith	Video
2012	Werewolf: The Beast Among Us	Vodama	Video
2012	23 Minutes to Sunrise	Rachel	
2013	Dante's Hell Animated	Beatrice (voice)	Short
2014	Lap Dance	Kelly	
2015	Lavalantula	Olivia West	TV movie
2017	Alaska Is a Drag	Lucy	
2017	Mnemosyne	Claudia	
2018	Mistrust	Kristen Rhodes	
2019	The Untold Story	Catarina	
2019	Dying for a Baby	Blanche	TV movie
2019	Badland Wives	Madam Rosie	TV movie

=== Television ===
Year	Title	Role	Notes
1981	The Music Shoppe	Darcie	Main cast
1983	Tales of the Gold Monkey	Zita Henriques	Episode: "The Sultan of Swat"
1983	Hardcastle and McCormick	Waitress	Episode: "Flying Down to Rio"
1983	Days of Our Lives	Mallory	Regular cast
1983	General Hospital	Carla Escobar	Regular cast
1983–1986	Fame	Nicole Chapman	Main cast: season 4–6
1984	T.J. Hooker	Maria Dominguez	Episode: "Gang War"
1985	Dance Fever	Herself	Episode: "Don Stroud, Nia Peeples, Nicholas Campbell"
1987–1988	Top of the Pops	Herself/host	Main host: season 24
1988	Soul Train	Herself	Episode: "Johnny Mathis/Nia Peeples/Tracie Spencer"
1989	Matlock	Morgan Gerard	Episode: "The Starlet"
1989–1990	Nasty Boys	Serena Cruz	Main cast
1991	The Party Machine with Nia Peeples	Herself/hostess	Main host
1992	Soul Train	Herself	Episode: "Nia Peeples/Eric B. & Rakim"
1993	The New WKRP in Cincinnati	Sierra Smith	Episode: "Treasure of Sierra Smith" & "Chicago Story"
1993	Return to Lonesome Dove	Augostina Vega	Main cast
1994	Highlander: The Series	Nefertiri	Episode: "Pharaoh's Daughter"
1994	Touched by an Angel	Angela Evans	Episode: "Fallen Angela"
1994	ABC Afterschool Specials	Herself	Episode: "I Hate the Way I Look"
1995	Marker	Lisa	Episode: "The Pilot" & "Snowballs in Hawaii"
1995	Courthouse	Veronica Gilbert	Main cast
1995	The Puzzle Place	Herself	Episode: "Gotta Dance"
1997	Crisis Center	Lily Gannon	Main cast
1997	Early Edition	Sister Mary	Episode: "Angels and Devils"
1998	Real Life	Maya	Episode: "Unaired Pilot"
1999–2001	Walker, Texas Ranger	Sydney Cooke	Main cast: season 7–8
2002	Where Are They Now?	Herself	Episode: "Dance"
2004	Andromeda	Rox Nava	Episode: "The Spider's Stratagem"
2004	The Division	Sandra Prestiss	Episode: "Zero Tolerance: Part 1 & 2"
2005	Barbershop	Det. Hahanna	Recurring cast
2007–2009	The Young and the Restless	Karen Taylor	Regular cast
2010–2017	Pretty Little Liars	Pam Fields	Main cast: season 1, recurring cast: season 2-4 & 6, guest: season 5 & 7
2013	Celebrity Wife Swap	Herself	Episode: "Nia Peeples/Tiffany"
2014	Longmire	Adele Chapman	Episode: "Wanted Man"
2016	Unsung	Herself	Episode: "Howard Hewett"
2017–2018	The Fosters	Susan Mullen	Recurring cast: Season 5
2020	Pretty Little Wine Moms Re-Watch	Nia	Episode: "The Pilot"
2020	Homeward Bound: Surviving the Coronavirus	Nia	Episode: "Wet Suits, Mary Poppins and Pretty Little Wine Moms"

== See also ==
- List of artists who reached number one on the US Dance chart
- List of number-one dance hits (United States)
