= Sexual Feeling =

Single by La Toya Jackson

from the album Bad Girl
- Released: 1990
- Recorded: 1990
- Genre: Pop; italo house; hip house; dance
- Length: 5:22 (Album Version); 6:03 ("La Toya" Remix)
- Label: High Fashion Music
- Songwriter(s): La Toya Jackson; Alberto Boi; Claudio Donato; Frank Moiraghi; Lorenzo Pozzi; D. Vollaro
- Producer(s): Claudio Donato; Franco Donato

La Toya Jackson singles chronology
"Bad Girl" (1989)	"Sexual Feeling" (1990)	"You and Me" (1990)

Alternative cover
- "La Toya" Remix cover

"Sexual Feeling" is a 1990 single by American singer La Toya Jackson.

== Song information ==
The song was recorded in Milan, Italy in April 1990. Her manager, Jack Gordon, was approached by producers Franco and Claudio Donato who wanted La Toya for a sexy, "moan-and-groan" track.

Three mixes of the song were included on the original release. The "Rapsody Version" included a rap by La Toya and the "Vocal Version" was used as a track on La Toya's Bad Girl album, first released in 1991 through Sherman Records. The "Sex Vocal" is an a capella track.

The "La Toya" remix was produced by Quincy Lizer and released as a single in 1990 throughout Italy and the Netherlands.

== Versions ==
=== Original version ===
1. "Sexual Feeling (Vocal Version)" 5:30
2. "Sexual Feeling (Rapsody Version)" 5:30
3. "Sexual Feeling (Sex Vocal)" 4:00

=== "La Toya" Remix ===
1. "Sexual Feeling 'La Toya' Remix (Radio Version)" 3:28
2. "Sexual Feeling 'La Toya' Remix" 6:03
3. "Sexual Feeling 'La Toya' Remix (Instrumental)" 5:16
4. "Sexual Feeling "La Toya" Remix (Acapella)" 2:28

=== 2010 Remix ===
1. "Sexual Feeling" (Brando Menella remix) 8:10
