= Break My Stride =

1983 single by Matthew Wilder

Single by Matthew Wilder

from the album I Don't Speak the Language
- B-side: "Break My Stride" (instrumental)
- Released: August 1983
- Recorded: 1983, Los Angeles
- Genre: Synth-pop; pop rock; reggae; new wave
- Length: 3:04
- Label: Private-I
- Songwriters: Matthew Wilder; Greg Prestopino
- Producers: Peter Bunetta; Rick Chudacoff; Bill Elliot

Matthew Wilder singles chronology
"Break My Stride" (1983)	"The Kid's American" (1984)

"Break My Stride" is a song performed by American recording artist Matthew Wilder. It was released in August 1983 by Private-I as the lead single from his debut album, I Don't Speak the Language (1983), and became a major worldwide hit single for him in late 1983 and spring 1984, reaching numbers five and two on the US Billboard Hot 100 and Cash Box Top 100. Wilder co-wrote the song with Greg Prestopino, and it was produced by Peter Bunetta, Rick Chudacoff and Bill Elliot.

The song has been covered by many artists throughout the years, including Unique II in 1996 and Blue Lagoon in 2004 (whose versions both charted highly in various countries) and, in interpolations, Puff Daddy with his 1997 hit "Can't Nobody Hold Me Down" and Aaron Carter on the song "Stride (Jump on the Fizzy)" from his 2001 album Oh Aaron. In 2009, it was interpolated by Matisyahu in the song "Jerusalem".

== Composition ==
Industry executive Clive Davis signed Wilder to Arista Records in 1981 or 1982, but Wilder was not getting the results he or the producers wanted with finding the style of music that worked for him. Poor and near the end of a frustrating period with the record label, he self-financed the recording of "Break My Stride" in the early hours of the morning at the studio of producer Spencer Proffer. "My relationship with Clive Davis was precisely the impetus for my writing the song. There are lyrics in there that are indirectly referring to the circumstances that were governing my life at that point," said Wilder. They threw a party after the recording, and had the music production team sing the chorus, which can be heard at the end of the song. However, Davis did not see potential in the song or any of the others, and his label let Wilder go. Since Arista had not paid Wilder for any of the songs, he was free to shop them around.

Wilder managed to connect with record promoter Joe Isgro, who had a history of doing legally questionable things to promote and chart certain songs. Isgro released "Break My Stride" off his new record label, Private-I, and created the illusion that it was a massive hit, prompting other radio stations to start playing the song, and propelling Wilder's single into the top 5 of the US Billboard charts.

In musical notation, "Break My Stride" is written in the key of B♭ Lydian with a tempo of 108 beats per minute. The song shifts to F major for the first two choruses, F Dorian and G Dorian for the bridge, and then G major for the final chorus.

=== Chart performance ===
"Break My Stride" reached number five on the US Billboard Hot 100 and number four in the UK in January and February 1984. On the US Cash Box Top 100, Wilder's single reached the number two position, where it remained for two weeks in early February. A remix version reached the top 20 on the dance chart, and the song additionally hit the Billboard Hot Black Singles chart, staying there for four weeks. Though "Break My Stride" was Wilder's only UK hit, he also reached the US pop chart with his next two singles, "The Kid's American" (number 33) and "Bouncing Off the Walls" (number 52), before turning to behind-the-scenes work on other artists' recordings.

=== Track listings ===
- 7-inch single
1. "Break My Stride" – 3:05
2. "Break My Stride" (instrumental) – 3:05
- 12-inch single
1. "Break My Stride" (Remix / Club Version) – 5:10
2. "Break My Stride" (dub version) – 4:02

=== Personnel ===
- Matthew Wilder – lead and backing vocals, Prophet-5
- Bill Elliott – Prophet-5
- Dennis Herring – guitar
- Peter Bunetta – Oberheim DMX
- John Gilston – Simmons drum programming
- Greg Prestopino – backing vocals
- Joe Turano – backing vocals

=== Charts ===
==== Weekly charts ====
Chart (1983–1984)	Peak position
Australia (Kent Music Report)	6
Austria (Ö3 Austria Top 40)	8
Belgium (Ultratop Flanders)	3
Canada Top Singles (RPM)	5
Ireland (Irish Singles Chart)	3
Netherlands (Single Top 100)	5
New Zealand (RIANZ)	3
Norway (VG-lista)	1
South Africa (Springbok Radio)	4
Sweden (Sverigetopplistan)	14
Switzerland (Schweizer Hitparade)	22
UK Singles (OCC)	4
US Billboard Hot 100	5
US Hot Adult Contemporary (Billboard)	4
US Hot Black Singles (Billboard)	76
US Dance/Disco Top 80 (Billboard)	17
US Cash Box Top 100	2
Venezuela (UPI)	8
West Germany (GfK)	7

Chart (2020)	Peak position
Czech Republic Singles Digital (ČNS IFPI)	53
Scotland Singles (OCC)	58

==== Year-end charts ====
Chart (1984)	Position
Australia (Kent Music Report)	37
Canada Top Singles (RPM)	41
New Zealand (RIANZ)	42
South Africa (Springbok Radio)	18
US Billboard Hot 100	27
US Cash Box Top 100	28

=== Certifications ===
Region	Certification	Certified units/sales
Australia (ARIA)	Gold	35,000^{‡}
Canada (Music Canada)	Gold	50,000^{^}
Denmark (IFPI Danmark)	Platinum	90,000^{‡}
New Zealand (RMNZ)	Platinum	30,000^{‡}
United Kingdom (BPI)	Platinum	600,000^{‡}
^{^} Shipments figures based on certification alone.^{‡} Sales+streaming figures based on certification alone.

== Unique II version ==
"Break My Stride"

Single by Unique II

from the album Level II
- Released: July 8, 1996
- Genre: Dance
- Length: 3:10
- Label: Dance Pool
- Songwriters: Matthew Wilder; Greg Prestopino
- Producer: Unique II

Unique II singles chronology
"Do What You Please" (1996)	"Break My Stride" (1996)	"For Tonight" (1996)

Music video
- "Break My Stride" on YouTube

In July 1996, Austrian Eurodance project Unique II released a cover of "Break My Stride". This version of the song, released via label Dance Pool, was the first international success for the band, peaking at number one in Austria and New Zealand, as well as number two in Australia. The single also charted in Canada, Ireland, Italy, and Scandinavia.

=== Critical reception ===
Larry Flick from Billboard magazine wrote, "Yep, this is a dance-leaning cover of the Matthew Wilder '80s pop chestnut. It has already saturated radio airwaves throughout Europe, with a number of programmers here already giving it positive feedback. Highly videogenic Viennese songbird Jade Davies chirps her way through the track's Ace of Base-like reggae-inflected groove with engaging energy. She'll have little to no trouble successfully carrying this one into the hearts of folks who prefer familiarity over adventure." Australian music channel Max ranked Unique II's version of the song among the "1000 Greatest Songs of All Time" in 2013.

=== Chart performance ===
"Break My Stride" peaked at number-one in Austria and New Zealand, for seven and two weeks. In Austria, it ended up as the fifth-most sold single of the year. It also became a successful top-10 hit in Australia, the Czech Republic, Denmark, and Ireland. On the Eurochart Hot 100, it reached number 33 in its sixth week on the chart, in September 1996. "Break My Stride" was also a hit in Israel, where it peaked at number six, and in Canada, reaching number 18 on the RPM 100 Hit Tracks and number 19 on the RPM Dance chart. The single was awarded with a platinum record in Australia and Austria, after 70,000 and 50,000 units were sold in these countries. In 2002, a new remix of the song peaked at number 55 in Austria.

=== Track listings ===
- CD maxi
1. "Break My Stride" (FM Track) – 3:16
2. "Break My Stride" (Prolongation) – 4:57
3. "Break My Stride" (Native Track) – 5:14
- CD maxi – The Remixes
1. "Break My Stride" (Marc McCan edit) – 5:38
2. "Break My Stride" (Next Level edit) – 4:37
3. "Break My Stride" (radio edit) – 3:16
- CD maxi – Re-Work 2002
1. "Break My Stride" (Panamericana radio edit) – 2:50
2. "Break My Stride" (extended version) – 4:57
3. "Break My Stride" (Big club mix) – 4:20
4. "Break My Stride" (original) – 3:16

=== Charts ===
==== Weekly charts ====
Chart (1996–1997)	Peak position
Australia (ARIA)	2
Austria (Ö3 Austria Top 40)	1
Canada Top Singles (RPM)	18
Canada Adult Contemporary (RPM)	53
Canada Dance/Urban (RPM)	19
Czech Republic (IFPI CR)	3
Denmark (IFPI)	9
Estonia (Eesti Top 20)	17
Europe (Eurochart Hot 100)	33
Ireland (IRMA)	9
Israel (Israeli Singles Chart)	6
New Zealand (Recorded Music NZ)	1
UK Pop Tip Club Chart (Music Week)	10

Chart (2002)	Peak position
Austria (Ö3 Austria Top 40) 2002 remix	55

==== Year-end charts ====
Chart (1996)	Position
Austria (Ö3 Austria Top 40)	5

Chart (1997)	Position
Australia (ARIA)	10
New Zealand (RIANZ)	20

==== Decade-end charts ====
Chart (1990–1999)	Rank
Austria (Ö3 Austria Top 40)	62

=== Certifications ===
Region	Certification	Certified units/sales
Australia (ARIA)	Platinum	70,000^{^}
Austria (IFPI Austria)	Platinum	50,000^{*}
^{*} Sales figures based on certification alone.^{^} Shipments figures based on certification alone.

=== Release history ===
Region	Date	Format(s)	Label(s)	Ref.
Austria	July 8, 1996	CD	Dance Pool	
United States	February 3, 1998	Contemporary hit radio	Columbia	

== Blue Lagoon version ==
"Break My Stride"

Single by Blue Lagoon

from the album Club Lagoon
- B-side: "Love Is the Key"
- Released: August 9, 2004
- Length: 3:04
- Label: SME; Universal Music
- Songwriters: Matthew Wilder; Greg Prestopino
- Producer: Felix J. Gauder

Blue Lagoon singles chronology
"Break My Stride" (2004)	"Do You Really Want to Hurt Me" (2005)

In 2004, "Break My Stride" was covered by German band Blue Lagoon and became a hit in several European countries, including Austria, Germany, Sweden and Denmark, where it reached the top ten.

=== Track listings ===
- CD single
1. "Break My Stride" (radio edit) – 3:04
2. "Break My Stride" (extended version) – 5:10
3. "Love Is the Key" – 3:27
- CD maxi
1. "Break My Stride" (radio edit) – 3:01
2. "Break My Stride" (extended version) – 5:08
3. "Love Is the Key" – 3:26
4. "Break My Stride" (a capella reprise) – 1:05
5. "Break My Stride" (video)

=== Charts ===
==== Weekly charts ====
Chart (2004–2005)	Peak position
Austria (Ö3 Austria Top 40)	6
Belgium (Ultratop 50 Flanders)	49
Belgium (Ultratip Bubbling Under Wallonia)	1
Denmark (Tracklisten)	10
France (SNEP)	18
Germany (GfK)	2
Netherlands (Single Top 100)	45
Sweden (Sverigetopplistan)	4
Switzerland (Schweizer Hitparade)	15

Chart (2024)	Peak position
Poland (Polish Airplay Top 100)	75

==== Year-end charts ====
Chart (2004)	Position
Austria (Ö3 Austria Top 40)	75
Germany (Media Control GfK)	16

=== Certifications ===
Region	Certification	Certified units/sales
Germany (BVMI)	Gold	150,000^{^}
Sweden (GLF)	Gold	10,000^{^}
^{^} Shipments figures based on certification alone.

== In popular culture ==
The song serves as the closing credits music for the 2011 film Cedar Rapids. It was featured in a 2012 television commercial for State Insurance of New Zealand. In 2019, it was featured in a U.S. television commercial for Santander Bank.

The song gained more notoriety in 2020 on TikTok, as it was frequently used in TikTok videos – where users would text their friends the lyrics of the song. Matthew Wilder was thrilled at these memes, saying that the results are often bizarre but hilarious. Afterwards, Wilder posted an official lyric video that featured text messages of the song's lyrics.
