= Matthew Wilder =

American musician (born 1953)

- Born: Matthew Weiner; January 24, 1953 (age 73); New York City, U.S.
- Genres: New wave; synth-pop
- Occupations: Musician; singer; songwriter; record producer
- Instruments: Vocals; keyboards; synthesizers; piano; guitar
- Years active: 1972–present
- Labels: Columbia; Epic
- Website: matthewwildermusic.com

Matthew Wilder (né Weiner; January 24, 1953) is an American musician, singer, songwriter and record producer. He is best known for his 1983 hit single "Break My Stride", which hit No. 2 on the Cashbox chart and No. 5 on the Billboard Hot 100. He also wrote the music for the Disney animated feature film Mulan and provided the singing voice for the character Ling.

== Early life ==
Matthew Wilder was born on Long Island, New York, into a Jewish family. His mother was an opera singer and a graduate of the Juilliard School of Music, and both his father and paternal grandfather worked as theatrical advertisers on Broadway. Wilder started studying classical piano at age four.

When Wilder was 14, his family relocated from Long Island to Greenwich Village. With his father's connections to Broadway, Wilder grew up watching a variety of musicals, which later influenced his musical style. By his second year of high school he had begun performing at the neighborhood's folk clubs, including The Bitter End, The Gaslight, and Café Wha. He recorded his first album of original material at age 16. Wilder graduated from the New Lincoln School.

== Career ==
Wilder was one-half of the Greenwich Village folk rock group Matthew & Peter in the 1970s. In 1978, he moved to Los Angeles, and sang for television commercials and as a backup vocalist for Rickie Lee Jones and Bette Midler.

Wilder's debut album, I Don't Speak the Language (1983), reached No. 49 on the Billboard 200, fueled by "Break My Stride". Wilder had some continued success with the single "The Kid's American", which reached No. 33 in 1984, but the single failed to match the success of "Break My Stride". Wilder's second album, Bouncin' Off the Walls (1984), failed to gain much momentum — even with an innovative music video for the single "Bouncin' Off the Walls" — with only the title track making the charts (No. 52), and was subsequently deemed a commercial failure.

Despite the downturn in his solo career, Wilder continued his career in the music industry as a songwriter and as a record producer for such acts as No Doubt (the hit album Tragic Kingdom), 702, Christina Aguilera, Kelly Clarkson, Miley Cyrus on her Hannah Montana song "G.N.O. (Girls Night Out)", The Belle Brigade, King Charles, and Joanna Pacitti. He has also done production work on Australian singer-songwriter Mig Ayesa's self-titled album released in April 2007 and has helped with production on Hayden Panettiere's unreleased album.

For the Disney film Mulan, Wilder co-wrote the songs with lyricist David Zippel. Wilder also lent his singing voice to the character of Ling. He won an Annie Award nomination for Music in an Animated Feature Production, and was nominated for an Academy Award for Best Original Musical or Comedy Score (along with David Zippel and Jerry Goldsmith) for his work on that film.

For theatre, Wilder once again paired with Zippel to provide the music and lyrics for Princesses, a musical comedy update of Frances Hodgson Burnett's novel A Little Princess. The production ran at the 5th Avenue Theatre in Seattle in 2003. In 2025, Wilder's musical, Stiletto, premiered in London at the Charing Cross Theatre. Wilder wrote the music and lyrics, the book was written by British playwright Tim Luscombe. The story centres on a love story between two young singers struggling to find their way into the opera world of 1730s Venice.

== Discography ==
=== Studio albums ===
Title	Details	Peak chart positions		
Title	Details	US	AUS	NLD
I Don't Speak the Language	Released: October 13, 1983; Label: Private-I, Epic; Format: LP, CD	49	95	55
Bouncin' Off the Walls	Released: 1985; Label: Sony; Format: LP, CD	—	—	—
Especially on Birthdays	Released: March 3, 2021; Label: Self-released; Format: Digital download, streaming	—	—	—

With Matthew & Peter

- Under the Arch (1972, with Matthew & Peter)

=== Soundtrack albums ===
Title	Details	Peak chart positions	Certifications
Title	Details	US	Certifications
Mulan (with David Zippel and Jerry Goldsmith)	Released: June 2, 1998; Label: Walt Disney; Format: LP, CD	24	RIAA: Gold

=== Singles ===
Title	Year	Peak chart positions										Certifications (sales threshold)	Album
Title	Year	US	US CB	US AC	US Dance	US R&B/HH	AUS	BEL	GER	NLD	UK	Certifications (sales threshold)	Album
"Work So Hard"	1982	—	—	32	—	—	—	—	—	—	—		—N/a
"Break My Stride"	1983	5	2	4	17	76	6	3	7	5	4	ARIA: Gold; BPI: Platinum	I Don't Speak the Language
"The Kid's American"	1984	33	40	—	—	—	—	28	35	24	93		I Don't Speak the Language
"I Don't Speak the Language"	1984	—	—	—	—	—	—	—	—	—	—		I Don't Speak the Language
"Bouncin' Off the Walls"	1984	52	46	—	—	—	—	—	—	—	—		Bouncin' Off the Walls
"Mad for You"	1985	—	—	—	—	—	—	—	—	—	—		Bouncin' Off the Walls
"—" denotes releases that did not chart or was not released in that territory.

== Filmography ==
Year	Title	Role	Notes
1983	Break My Stride		Music video
1984	Top of the Pops		
1984	Solid Gold		
1984	American Bandstand		Two episodes
1984	The Kid's American		Music video
1985	Bouncin' Off the Walls		Music video
1998	Mulan	Ling (singing voice)	Animated feature film
1999	VH-1 Where Are They Now?		Television series documentary
