= Joe Isgro =

American record promoter

- Born: 1948 (age 77–78); Philadelphia, Pennsylvania, U.S.
- Occupations: Record promoter; marine; mobster

Joe Isgro (born c. 1948) is an American iconic record promoter known for breaking countless hit records and shaping the careers of major artists across pop, rock, and R&B, and a reputed soldier in the Gambino crime family. In the 1980s, Isgro was at the center of investigations into the role of payola in the music industry.

== Early life ==
Isgro was born in Philadelphia, Pennsylvania. He enlisted in the U.S. Marine Corps and at the age of 19, he was presented with a Purple Heart for his bravery and wounds received during combat in the Vietnam War. His term with the Marines ended in 1968.

== Career ==
Isgro's career began as local promotion director for Decca Records (which later became MCA Records). His responsibilities included record promotion of various artists for the Pennsylvania and New Jersey territories. Some of these artists included Neil Diamond, Murray Head, Jesus Christ Superstar, Sonny & Cher, The Who and Elton John.

In 1970, Isgro went to work for Paramount Records as the regional promoter, working with such artists as Billy Joel, Dave Mason and The Crusaders. Isgro then went to work for Schwartz Bros., the largest independent record distributor whose clients included Motown, A&M Records, RCA Records, Chrysalis Records and Arista Records. In 1974, Roulette Records hired Isgro as the National Director of Promotion. Isgro led the promotional staff and oversaw the company's publicity and advertising department.

Motown Records hired Isgro in 1976 as Regional Director of Promotion. He was responsible for the promotion and development of Diana Ross, Stevie Wonder, Marvin Gaye, Smokey Robinson, The Temptations, Lionel Richie, The Jacksons, The Commodores, Thelma Houston and Teena Marie. In the years to follow, Isgro was promoted to National Director of Promotion, which brought him to California, and then to Executive Vice President of Promotion.

After several years with Motown, Isgro left and became involved in the formation of EMI Records, a division of Capitol Records. Isgro was brought onto EMI to handle the promotion staff of the new label on the West Coast.

In 1979, he formed Isgro Enterprises, Inc., an independent record promotion and consulting company. Isgro promoted releases for several major labels including records by artists including Michael Jackson, Culture Club, Neil Diamond, Journey, Diana Ross, Paul Young, Lionel Richie, Dionne Warwick, Hall & Oates, Barbra Streisand, The Rolling Stones, Supertramp, Kenny Rogers, Sheena Easton, Wham!, Bruce Springsteen, Kim Carnes, Chicago, Patti LaBelle, Phil Collins, Rod Stewart, U2, David Bowie, Elton John, Madonna, George Michael, Janet Jackson and Paula Abdul.

Isgro then developed Los Angeles Recording Company (LARC), distributed through MCA Records. LARC signed acts The Chi-Lites, The Dells, The Staple Singers and Bonnie Pointer. Soon after the formation of LARC Records, Isgro established a second label, Private I Records, distributed through Columbia Records. The first release of Private I Records was Matthew Wilder’s "Break My Stride", which peaked at number two on the US chart position. It would be the first of Private I's 27 charting singles.

In 1992, Isgro produced the film Hoffa, starring Jack Nicholson, Danny DeVito and Armand Assante. It was nominated for an Academy Award and a Golden Globe Award.

Currently, Isgro is a producer at Raging Bull Productions His projects include the films Lucky Luciano, Pablo Escobar and The Stone Pony. Isgro secured the rights for the Luciano story in 2007 and the film is currently in pre-production.

=== Legal trials ===
In September 1990, Isgro and two other defendants were prosecuted for 57 counts of payola-related offenses, including racketeering, mail fraud, money laundering and obstruction of justice. The case was dismissed by federal Judge James M. Ideman on grounds of "outrageous government misconduct."

On March 25, 2000, Federal Bureau of Investigation agents and the Beverly Hills Police Department arrested the label owner and former independent promotion and charged him with a federal felony complaint of extortion. He was convicted and sentenced to 50 months in federal prison.

According to an FBI affidavit, Isgro and a crew of collectors and enforcers extorted hundreds of thousands of dollars from scores of victims, charging interest rates of up to 5% a week. The loan sharking operation had been going on since 1994, the FBI said.

According to criminal complaints filed in the case, a Rancho Palos Verdes, California, man, Bernard Beyda, complained to Beverly Hills police in January that he was threatened after he had difficulty making "loan" payments, which included 5% in weekly interest, to Saitta.

On July 30, 2014, Isgro pleaded not guilty in New York State Supreme Court to charges of gambling, conspiracy, and money laundering. He was released on $250,000 bail.

== See also ==
- List of people from Philadelphia
- List of film producers
- List of record producers
