= Another Round (Fat Joe song) =

Single by Fat Joe featuring Chris Brown
- Released: October 20, 2011
- Recorded: 2011
- Genre: Hip hop; R&B
- Length: 4:48
- Label: E1 • Terror Squad
- Songwriters: Joseph Cartagena, Chris Brown, Kenneth Joseph, Jarell Perry, Dallas Austin, Joyce Irby, Dre, Brian Pickens, Marcello Valenzano
- Producer: Yung Ladd • Cool & Dre

Fat Joe singles chronology
"Welcome to My Hood (Remix)" (2011)	"Another Round" (2011)	"Pride N Joy" (2012)

Chris Brown singles chronology
"International Love" (2011)	"Another Round" (2011)	"Strip" (2011)

"Another Round" is a single by American rapper Fat Joe featuring R&B singer Chris Brown. The hip hop and R&B song, which samples "I Will Always Love You" by Troop, was produced by Cool & Dre and Yung Ladd and co-written by Kenneth Joseph and Jarell Perry. On October 20, 2011, the single was released for digital download on iTunes.

== Background ==
On September 21, 2011, Fat Joe stated in an interview that besides working on The Darkside Vol. 2 mixtape, he was also working on a new studio album with the first single titled "Another Round" featuring Chris Brown.

== Music video ==
The music video for the song which was directed by Colin Tilley premiered on MTV Jams as the Jam of The week on December 25, 2011. The video featured a dedication to Heavy D, who had died on November 8.

== Remix ==
On April 2, 2012, the official remix premiered on Hot 97 by Funkmaster Flex. The remix features Chris Brown, Mary J. Blige, Fabolous & Kirko Bangz. It was later released on iTunes on April 3, 2012.

== Charts ==
=== Weekly charts ===
Chart (2012)	Peak position
US Billboard Hot 100	80
US Hot R&B/Hip-Hop Songs (Billboard)	5
US Hot Rap Songs (Billboard)	6
US Rhythmic Airplay (Billboard)	22

=== Year-end charts ===
Chart (2012)	Position
US Hot R&B/Hip-Hop Songs (Billboard)	19
US Hot Rap Songs (Billboard)	26

== Certifications ==
Region	Certification	Certified units/sales
New Zealand (RMNZ)	Gold	15,000^{‡}
United States (RIAA)	Gold	500,000^{‡}
^{‡} Sales+streaming figures based on certification alone.
