= Ambassador Hotel (Los Angeles) =

Former hotel in Los Angeles, California

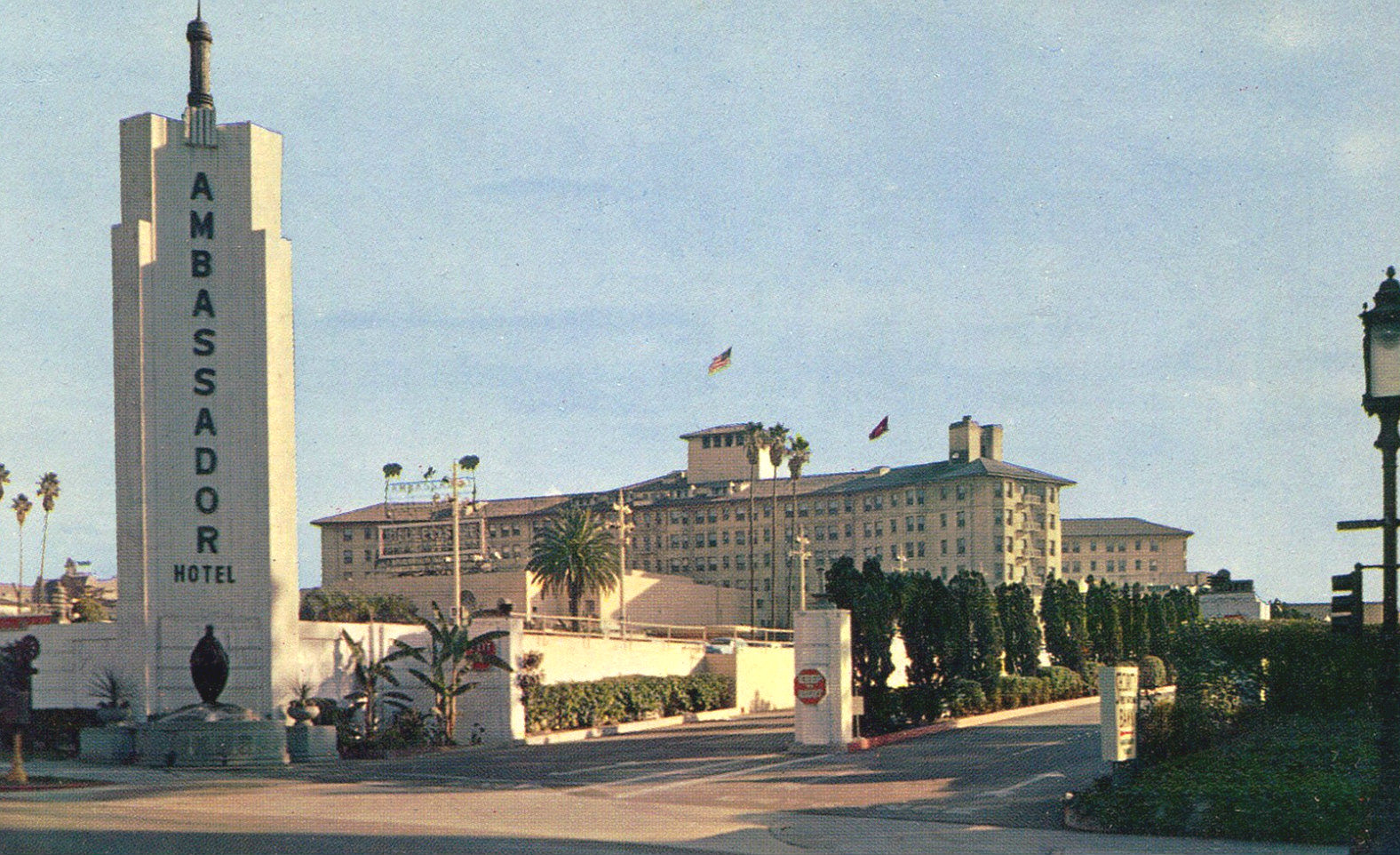
- Entrance gate of the Ambassador Hotel in 1959

- Location within Los Angeles Location within the Los Angeles metropolitan area Location within California Location within the United States

General information
- Location: 3400 Wilshire Boulevard; Los Angeles, California; United States
- Coordinates: 34°03′35″N 118°17′50″W
- Opening: January 1, 1921
- Closed: 1989
- Demolished: 2005–2006
- Cost: $5 million
- Owner: Schine family
- Operator: Ambassador Hotel Corporation (1921); Schine family

Design and construction
- Architects: Myron Hunt (1921); Paul Williams (1949)

Other information
- Number of rooms: 1,000

The Ambassador Hotel was a high-end, luxury hotel in Los Angeles, California. Designed by architect Myron Hunt, the hotel formally opened to the public on January 1, 1921. Later renovations by architect Paul Williams were made to the hotel in the late 1940s. It was also home to the Cocoanut Grove nightclub, a premier Los Angeles night spot for decades; and host to six Oscar ceremonies and to every United States president from Herbert Hoover to Richard Nixon. Prominent figures in the entertainment community visited and performed at the Cocoanut Grove.

The hotel was the site where United States senator Robert F. Kennedy was shot on June 5, 1968. Due to the decline of the Ambassador Hotel and the surrounding area, the hotel was closed to guests in 1989. In 2001, the Los Angeles Unified School District (LAUSD) purchased the property with the intent of constructing three new schools within the area. After subsequent litigation to preserve the hotel as a historic site, a settlement allowed demolition of the Ambassador Hotel to begin in 2005; it was completed in early 2006.

== Background ==
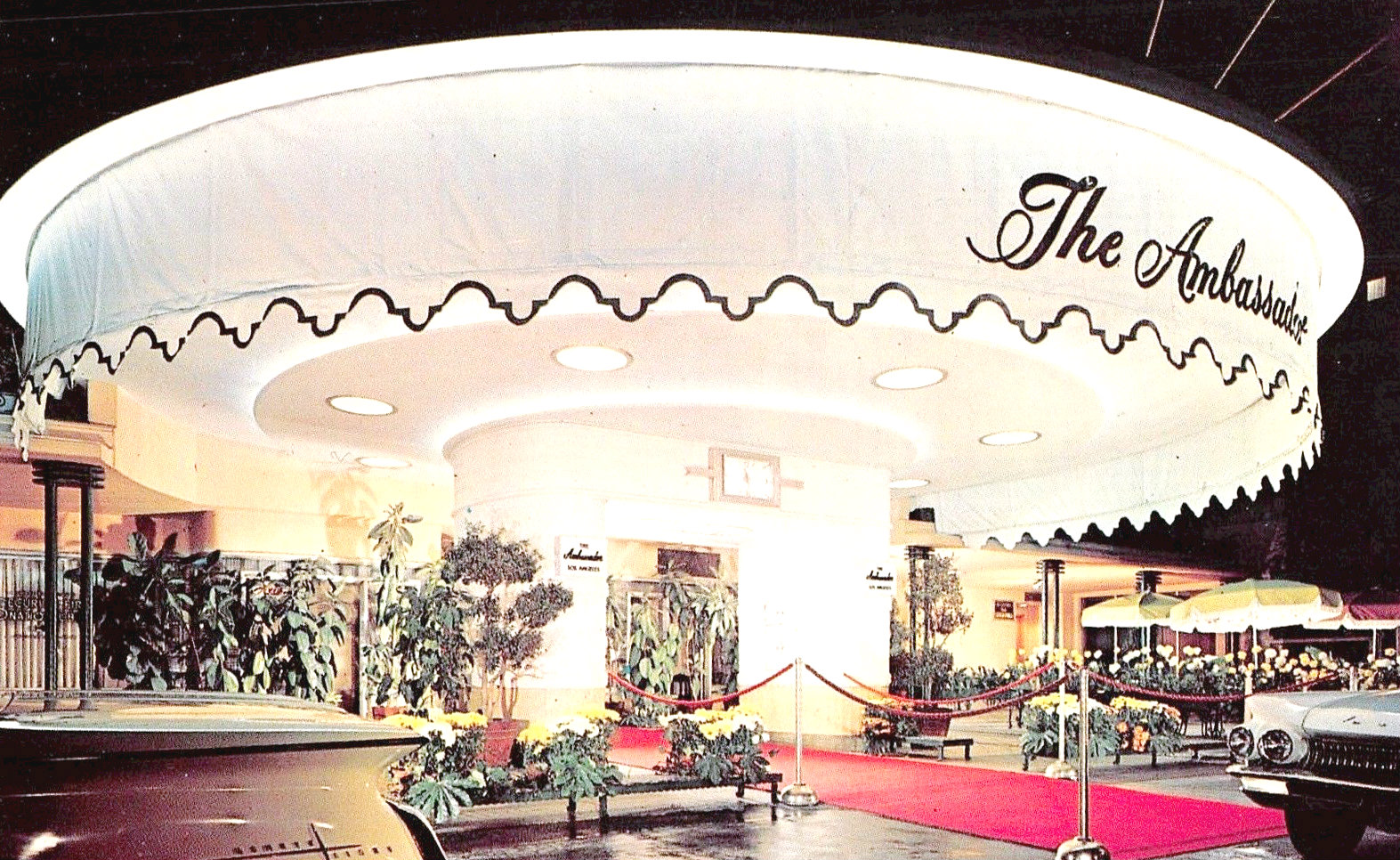
Entrance of the Ambassador Hotel, 1970.

Located at 3400 Wilshire Boulevard, between Catalina Street and Mariposa Avenue in present-day Koreatown, The Ambassador was set back from Wilshire Boulevard on 24 acres, which included the main hotel structure, a garage and numerous detached bungalows.

The Ambassador was built as part of the Ambassador Hotels System. At the time the hotel opened, on New Year's Day 1921, the chain consisted of The Ambassador in Los Angeles, the Hotel Alexandria in Los Angeles, The Ambassador in Santa Barbara, The Ambassador in Atlantic City and The Ambassador in New York. The Santa Barbara property burned down soon after on April 13, 1921, the Alexandria left the chain in 1925, while the Ambassador Palm Beach joined in 1929. The Schine family owned The Ambassador from its opening in 1921 until 1971.

The Ambassador Hotel was frequented by celebrities, some of whom, such as Pola Negri, resided there. From 1930 to 1943, six Academy Awards ceremonies were hosted at the hotel. Perhaps as many as seven U.S. presidents stayed at the Ambassador, from Hoover to Nixon, along with chiefs of state from around the world.

For decades, the hotel's famed Cocoanut Grove nightclub hosted well-known entertainers as patrons and/or performers, such as Lucille Ball, Shirley Bassey, Vikki Carr, Charlie Chaplin, Ray Charles, Nat King Cole, Natalie Cole, Perry Como, Bing Crosby, Dorothy Dandridge, Sammy Davis Jr., Douglas Fairbanks, Shep Fields, Henry Fonda, Sergio Franchi, Clark Gable, Judy Garland, Dizzy Gillespie, Benny Goodman, Cary Grant, Merv Griffin, Dick Haymes, Katharine Hepburn, Lena Horne, Evelyn Knight, Liberace, Little Richard, Martin and Lewis, Liza Minnelli, Marilyn Monroe, Mary Pickford, Richard Pryor, Ginger Rogers, Norma Shearer, Frank Sinatra, Barbra Streisand, Yma Sumac, The Supremes, Gloria Swanson, Norma Talmadge, Spencer Tracy, Rudolph Valentino, Vivian Vance, Veloz & Yolanda, John Wayne, Nancy Wilson, Anna May Wong, Loretta Young, and many others. Studio heads and major studio executives such as Howard Hughes, Louis B. Mayer and Irving Thalberg also frequented the Cocoanut Grove.

== History ==
=== Early history ===
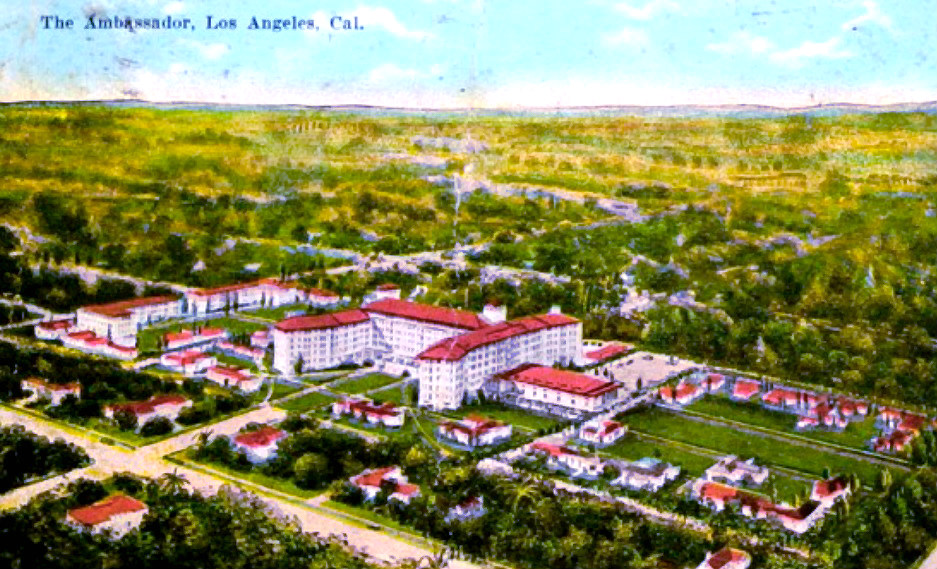
Early postcard of the Ambassador Hotel in March 1921.

Site plan drawn by Myron Hunt

Designed by American architect Myron Hunt, the Ambassador Hotel opened for business at the stroke of midnight on January 1, 1921, and quickly established a new standard of hotel luxury. Guests were greeted by a grand lobby upon arrival, with an oversized Italian fireplace, crystal chandeliers, oriental carpets and luxurious draperies adorning the lobby, along with a choice of 1,000 guestrooms and bungalows. The hotel occupied 23.7 acres at 3400 Wilshire Boulevard, bordered by Wilshire Boulevard at the north, 8th Street at the south, Catalina Street at the east, and nearly to Mariposa Avenue at the west. When the hotel's Cocoanut Grove nightclub opened on April 21, 1921, it officially solidified the hotel's social scene. In the 1980 book Are the Stars Out Tonight?, former Ambassador PR director Margaret Tante Burk recalled the Grove's opening night:

"...on the night of April 21, 1921… the new club officially opened its Moroccan style, gold leaf and etched palm tree doors... The Cocoanut Grove was aptly named, guests agreed as they were escorted by the maître de and captains down the wide plush grand staircase... Overhead, soaring about the room were cocoanut trees of papier mache, cocoanuts and palm fronds which had been rescued from the sandy beaches of Oxnard where they had served as atmosphere of the 1921 classic, The Sheik. Swinging from their branches were stuffed monkeys blinking at the revelers with their electrified amber eyes. Stars twinkled in the blue ceiling sky, and on the southernmost wall hung a full Hawaiian moon presiding over a painted landscape and splashing waterfall."

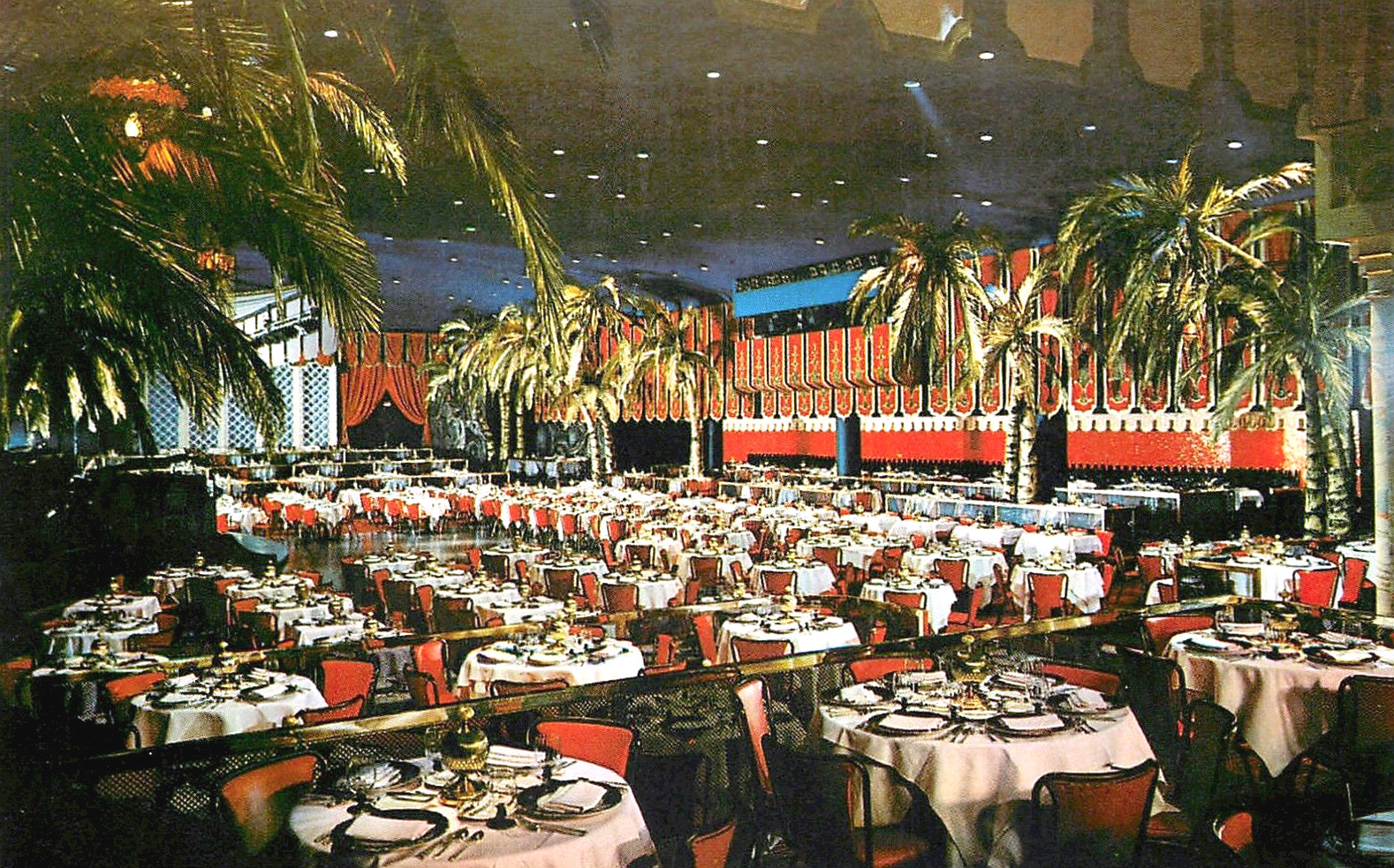
The Cocoanut Grove was Los Angeles' premier nightclub for celebrities and entertainers.

According to Photoplay, Joan Crawford and Carole Lombard were frequent competitors in the Charleston contests held on Friday nights; Lombard was discovered at the Grove. As Burk recalled, the famous artificial palm trees that adorned the Cocoanut Grove were left from Rudolph Valentino's 1921 silent romantic drama film The Sheik. The names of the hotel and its nightclub quickly became synonymous with glamour. As a result, “Cocoanut Grove" would become a trendy name for bars and clubs across the United States.

Beginning in 1928, Gus Arnheim led the Cocoanut Grove Orchestra, in which six to seven songs were sung each night. At one point, there was a two-hour broadcast of the orchestra on radio. On February 29, 1940, the 1939 Academy Awards ceremony was held in the Cocoanut Grove, with Bob Hope hosting the awards. The 1953 Golden Globe Awards also were presented at the hotel.

During World War II, U.S. servicemen mingled with movie stars at the hotel during numerous galas and fundraising events to help with the war effort.

Loyce Whiteman, singer for the Cocoanut Grove Orchestra, recalled, "the most beautiful thing about the Grove is that they stood in front of you when you sang and just swayed to the music. Joan Crawford would stand at the stand and sing a couple of choruses with the band. It was a house full of stars."

In November 1960 U.S. Vice President Richard M. Nixon, the 1960 Republican presidential nominee, watched the 1960 presidential election returns with his family and campaign staff from the Royal Suite of the Ambassador Hotel. One of the hotel's largest ballrooms was used as his election night headquarters. Nixon would narrowly lose the 1960 election to the Democratic candidate, Senator John F. Kennedy.

=== Assassination of Robert F. Kennedy ===
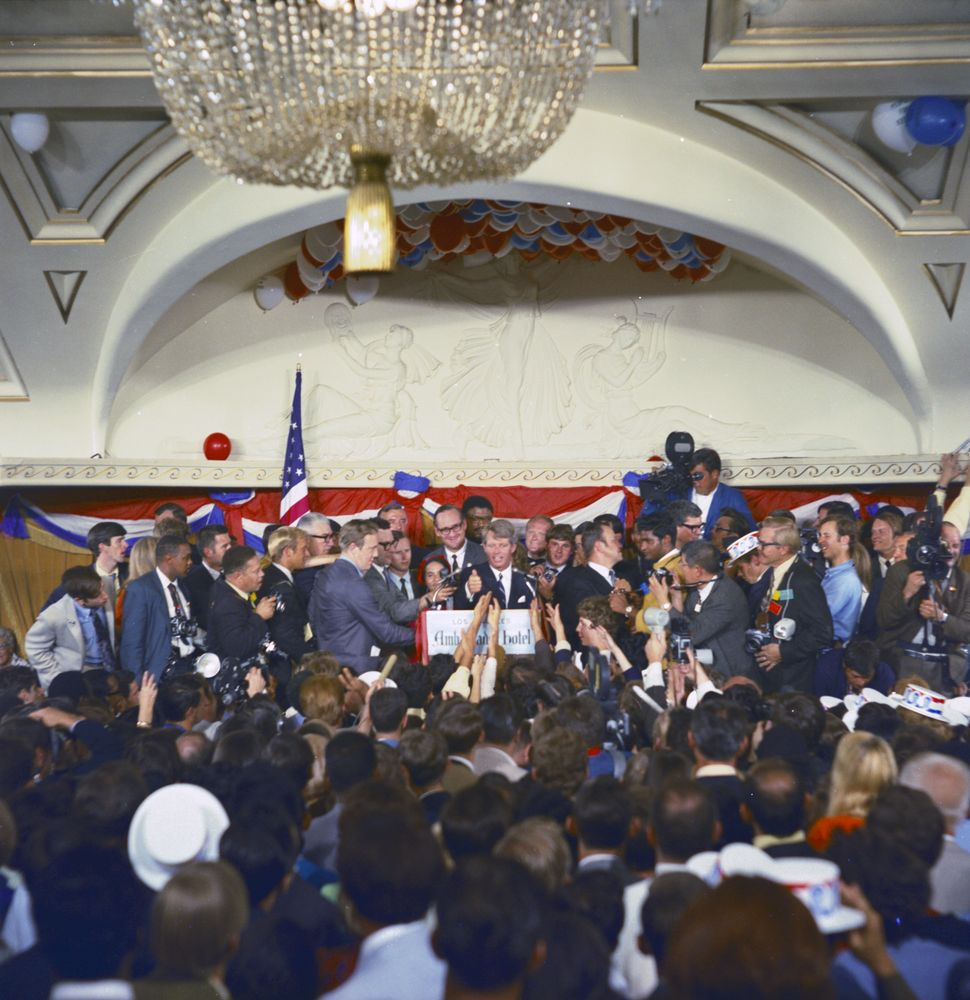
Robert F. Kennedy addressing supporters in the Embassy Ballroom of the Ambassador Hotel shortly before he was shot

On June 5, 1968, the winner of the California Democratic presidential primary election, United States Senator Robert F. Kennedy, gave a victory speech at the Ambassador Hotel to supporters. After the speech in the Embassy Room, Kennedy was shot three times along with five other people in the pantry area of the hotel's main kitchen shortly after midnight. Kennedy died the following day at Good Samaritan Hospital; the other victims all survived. Palestinian immigrant Sirhan Sirhan was arrested at the scene of the shooting and later convicted of the murder, though Kennedy's assassination continues to be subject to numerous conspiracy theories. During the demolition of the Ambassador Hotel in late 2005 and early 2006, portions of the area where the 1968 shooting occurred were eliminated from the site. The section of Wilshire Boulevard in front of the hotel has been signed the "Robert F. Kennedy Parkway".

=== Decline and closure ===
The death of Robert F. Kennedy marked the demise of the hotel coinciding with the decline of the surrounding neighborhood during the late 1960s and 1970s. The area also saw a surge of illegal drugs, poverty, and gang activity infiltrating the Wilshire corridor. Under the direction of Sammy Davis, Jr., the “Now Grove” replaced the classic Cocoanut Grove in 1970 in order to appeal to a modern nightclub crowd. However, patrons lost interest in both the hotel and the neighborhood surrounding it, which caused the Ambassador Hotel to fall into disrepair throughout the years. The Ambassador Hotel closed to guests in 1989, but it remained opened for filming and hosting private events. In 1991, Donald Trump, who had bought the hotel in hopes of tearing it down to build a 125-story building, sold off silver serving platters with the hotel's eagle-topped crest, tiki-style soup bowls from the famed Cocoanut Grove nightclub, and beds and nightstands from the rooms.

=== Preservation efforts ===
In 2004 and 2005, the Ambassador Hotel became the focus of a legal struggle between the Los Angeles Unified School District (LAUSD), which planned to clear the site and construct a school on the property, and the Los Angeles Conservancy and the Art Deco Society of Los Angeles, which wanted the hotel and its various elements preserved and integrated into the future school.

The Location Managers Guild organized an event together with the Jefferson High School Academy of Film and Television in March 2005, entitled Last Looks: The Ambassador Hotel. They mentored students in script breakdown and location scouting, using the hotel as a potential location to be scouted, documenting the property one last time. The images taken by both the students and the professionals were then exhibited side by side at Los Angeles City Hall.

After much litigation, a settlement was reached at the end of August 2005, allowing the demolition to begin in exchange for the establishment of a $4.9 million fund, reserved for saving historic school buildings in the Los Angeles Unified School District.

=== Demolition ===
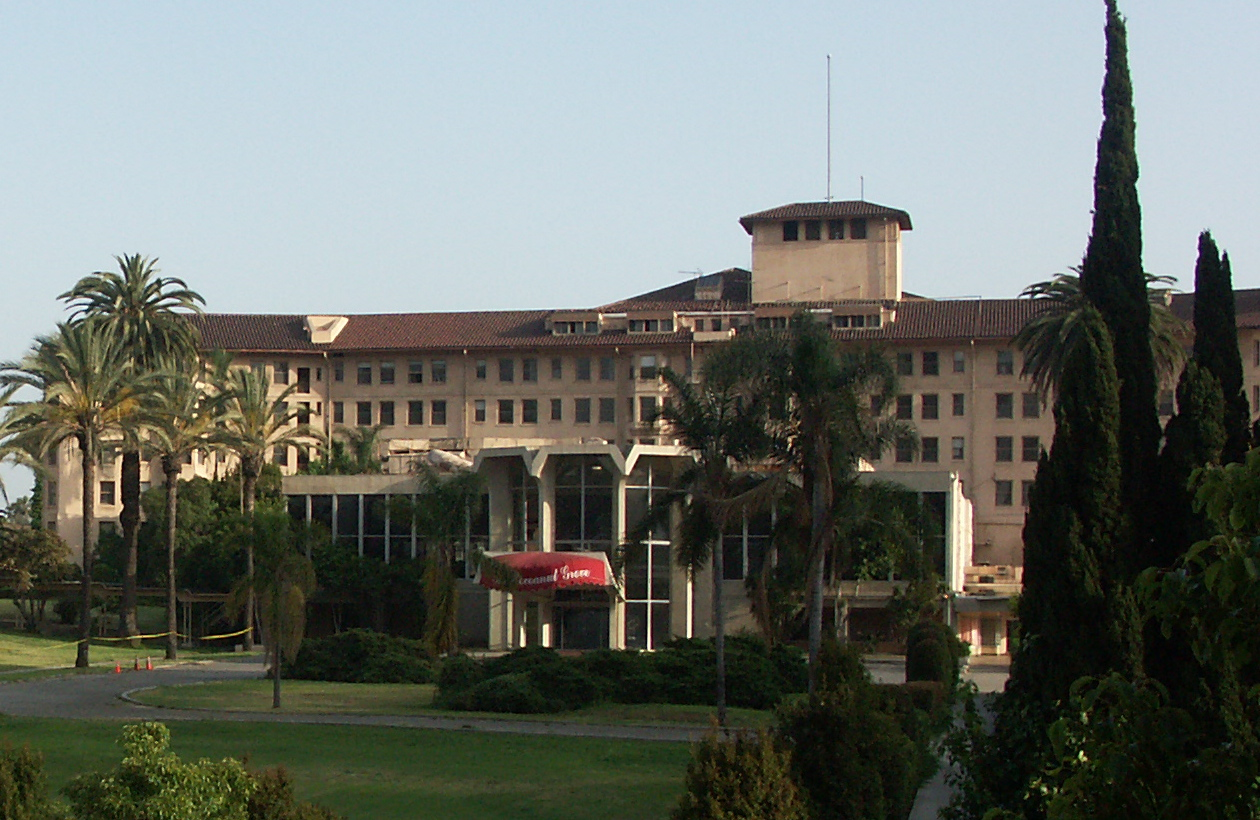
The Ambassador Hotel in 2004, a year before demolition began on site.

On September 10, 2005, a final public auction was held for the remaining fittings in the hotel's parking lot, with demolition commencing soon afterwards. On January 16, 2006, the last section of the Ambassador Hotel fell, leaving only the annex that housed the hotel's entrance, shopping arcade, coffee shop, and the Cocoanut Grove, which were promised to be preserved in some manner and integrated within the new school. A ceremony commemorating the demolition of the hotel was held across the street on February 2, 2006, at the H.M.S. Bounty restaurant, located on the ground floor of the Gaylord Apartments.

The Cocoanut Grove was renovated several times before, which destroyed much of its architectural integrity. It was promised that it would undergo yet another major transformation before becoming the auditorium for the new school. Also promised was preservation of the attached ground floor coffee shop, designed by architect Paul Williams. Studies by the LAUSD determined that the integrity of the Cocoanut Grove was weaker than anticipated and that they could neither use it within the planned school nor move it without risking its destruction. In 2004, the LAUSD board voted in favor of demolishing most of the Cocoanut Grove, retaining only the hotel entrance and east wall of the Grove. Litigation between the district and the Los Angeles Conservancy, which had sought to preserve the hotel, was settled out of court on December 18, 2007; demolition began on January 22, 2008.

=== New school ===
The Central Los Angeles New Learning Center #1 K–3, and Central Los Angeles New Learning Center #1 4–8/HS, along with the Robert F. Kennedy Inspiration Park, were built on the site.

The six schools were named as the Robert F. Kennedy Community Schools. The K–3 facility opened on September 9, 2009, and the 4–8 and high school facility began operation on September 14, 2010. The north side of the new school has a slightly similar appearance to the original facade of the hotel and north lawns will remain much the same, as seen from Wilshire Boulevard.

== In popular culture ==
=== Movies and television ===
The Ambassador Hotel was a filming location and backdrop for movies and television programs, starting with Jean Harlow's 1933 film Bombshell. An early MGM color short film, Starlit Days at the Lido (1935), was filmed in the Lido Spa at the hotel. In the 1980s and early 2000s, the hotel was filmed in Beverly Hills, 90210; Blow; Catch Me If You Can, Pretty Woman, Forrest Gump; The Italian Job; Mafia!; Murder, She Wrote; Heartbreakers, S.W.A.T.; and much more. It was also used in period films such as Almost Famous, Apollo 13, Hoffa, That Thing You Do!, and the kitchen was used in the 1997 made-for-TV adaptation of Disney's Tower of Terror.

The interactive movie/game based on the 1995 film Johnny Mnemonic was filmed there with a $3 million budget.

The last project filmed in the Ambassador Hotel's kitchen was "Spin the Bottle", a 2004 episode of the TV series Angel. The 2006 film Bobby was the last project to film on the hotel property, gaining access in late 2005 to film crucial establishing shots even while portions of the hotel were already in the process of being demolished.

The Ambassador Hotel itself has also been depicted in films. The Cocoanut Grove was recreated in the films The Aviator and The Thirteenth Floor.

=== Musical events and music videos ===
The Cocoanut Grove hosted musician Roy Orbison and several performers on September 30, 1987, for the television special Roy Orbison and Friends: A Black and White Night, first shown on Cinemax on January 3, 1988.

Guns N' Roses filmed the video of their song "Patience", in the hotel in 1989.

R&B singer Chuckii Booker filmed the video of his song "Games" from the album Niice 'n Wiild at the hotel in 1992.

The hotel served as the filming location for the video of the 1997 Marilyn Manson single "Long Hard Road Out of Hell," off the soundtrack for the Todd McFarlane motion picture Spawn.

In November 1997, punk-rock band Green Day filmed the video of the song "Good Riddance (Time of Your Life)" in the hotel.

Rock band 311 used the lobby of the hotel as the backdrop for a photo shoot of the cover of their 2003 album Evolver.

Also on October 29, 2002, rock band Linkin Park held their press photo shoot for their album Meteora at the hotel.
