= Attitude (Troop album) =

Studio album by Troop
- Released: October 13, 1989
- Recorded: September 1988 – August 1989
- Genres: R&B; pop; urban; soul; new jack swing
- Length: 43:13
- Label: Atlantic
- Producers: Chuckii Booker; Joyce Irby; Gerald Levert & Marc Gordon; Chris Troy & Zack Harmon; Steve Russell; Dallas Austin

Troop chronology
Troop (1988)	Attitude (1989)	Deepa (1992)

Singles from Attitude
- 1. "I'm Not Souped" Released: 1989; 2. "Spread My Wings" Released: 1989; 3. "All I Do Is Think of You" Released: 1990; 4. "That's My Attitude" Released: 1990; 5. "I Will Always Love You" Released: November 20, 1990

Attitude is the second album by new jack swing group Troop released by Atlantic Records on October 13, 1989. The album features numerous debuts by a few well known musicians. The songs "My Music" and "I Will Always Love You" marked the debut of record producer Dallas Austin, who co-produced the songs with his mentor Joyce "Fenderella" Irby - a former member of the band Klymaxx. A then-unknown Trent Reznor appeared as one of the recording engineers on the Gerald Levert produced songs "That's My Attitude" and "For You". The video version of the single "Spread My Wings" was one of the first songs remixed by hip hop producer Clark Kent.

Attitude was the highest-charting album from Troop, peaking within the Top 5 on the Top R&B Albums chart and received a gold certification. It spawned the group's first two R&B hits to peak at number-one: "Spread My Wings" and the cover of the Jackson 5 song, "All I Do Is Think of You," both of which was produced by singer and producer Chuckii Booker. Booker originally wanted to keep "Spread My Wings" for his 1989 debut Chuckii, but group member Steve Russell insisted on recording it for Attitude. Attitude remains as Troop's highest selling album to date.

== Reception ==
Professional ratings
Review scores
Source	Rating
Allmusic	3/5 stars

AllMusic critic Craig Lytle described the record as "a reasonably representative album for the group."

== Track listing ==
No.	Title	Writer(s)	Producer(s)	Length
1.	"My Music"	Steve Russell; Joyce "Fenderella" Irby; Dallas Austin; Allen McNeil	Irby; Austin	4:24
2.	"That's My Attitude"	Gerald Levert; Marc Gordon	Levert; Gordon	4:56
3.	"I'm Not Soupped"	Russell; William Z. Harmon; Chris Troy	Troy; Harmon	4:23
4.	"My Love"	Austin; Joyce Irby	Irby; Austin	3:45
5.	"Spread My Wings"	Chuckii Booker	Booker	4:39
6.	"All I Do Is Think of You"	Michael Lovesmith; Brian Holland	Booker	4:54
7.	"I Will Always Love You"	Russell; Irby; Austin	Irby; Austin	5:06
8.	"Another Lover"	Russell; McNeil; Rick Walker	Russell	5:01
9.	"For You"	Levert; Gordon	Levert; Gordon	4:28
10.	"Soupped Mix"	Russell; Harmon; Troy	Troy; Harmon	4:37
11.	"Reprise (Spread My Wings)"	Booker	Booker	2:55

- The song "Soupped Mix" is omitted from the LP version.

== Personnel ==
- Keyboards and Drum programming: Dallas Austin, Joyce Irby, Zack Harmon, Christopher Troy, Chuckii Booker, Steve Russell, Marc Gordon
- Keyboard Programming: Jim Salamone
- Guitar: Thomas Organ, Randy Bowland
- Drums: Derek Organ
- Recording engineer: Alvin Speights, Mike Tarsia, Trent Reznor, Pete Tokar, Big Al Richardson, Craig Burbidge, Greg Barrett, Anthony Jeffries, Bob Siebert, D.C.
- Mixing: Joyce Irby, Dallas Austin, Mike Tarsia, Merlin Bobb, Craig Burbidge, Jerry Solomon, Chuckii Booker, Taavi Mote
- Executive producer: Sylvia Rhone, Merlin Bobb
- Mastering: Dennis King
- Photography: Jeff Katz
- Art Direction: Bob Defrin

== Charts ==
Chart (1989–1990)	Peak position
US Billboard 200	73
US Top R&B Albums (Billboard)	5

=== Singles ===
Year	Single	Chart positions	
Year	Single	US	US R&B
1989	"I'm Not Souped"	—	19
1990	"Spread My Wings"	47	1
1990	"All I Do Is Think of You"	47	1
1990	"That's My Attitude"	—	11
1990	"I Will Always Love You"	—	31
