= Deepa (album) =

Studio album by Troop
- Released: June 2, 1992
- Genre: R&B, new jack swing
- Label: Atlantic Records
- Producer: Steve Russell, Demetrius Shipp, Lawrence A. McNeil, Gregory Cauthen

Troop chronology
Attitude (1989)	Deepa (1992)	A Lil' Sumpin' Sumpin' (1994)

Singles from Deepa
- 1. "Sweet November" Released: 1992; 2. "Whatever It Takes (To Make You Stay)" Released: 1992; 3. "Give It Up" Released: 1993

Professional ratings
Review scores
Source	Rating
AllMusic	3/5 stars

Deepa is the third studio album by new jack swing group Troop released by Atlantic Records on June 2, 1992. The album includes the #1 R&B hit "Sweet November" written by Babyface.

Deepa is largely a concept album, and includes somewhat racier subject matter than their previous two releases.

== Track listing ==
1. "Praise" - (Harreld, Steve Russell, Warren)
2. "Keep You Next to Me" - (Lawrence McNeil, Demetrius Shipp)
3. "She Blows My Mind" - (Steve Russell, Demetrius Shipp)
4. "I'm Not Gamin'" - (Steve Russell, Demetrius Shipp)
5. "Set Me Free" - (Gregory Cauthen, Steve Russell)
6. "Strange Hotel" - (Lawrence McNeil)
7. "I Feel You" - (Gregory Cauthen, Steve Russell)
8. "Sweet November" - (Babyface)
9. "Come Back to Your Home" - (Steve Russell)
10. "Only When I Laugh" - (Gregory Cauthen, Steve Russell)
11. "Whatever It Takes (To Make You Stay)" - (Drayton, Lawrence McNeil)
12. "You Take My Heart With You" - (Steve Russell)
13. "Deepa" - (Gregory Cauthen, Steve Russell)
14. "Give It Up" - (Gregory Cauthen, Steve Russell)
15. "Hot Water" - (Ray Lamont Jones, Lawrence McNeil)

== Personnel ==
- Troop - Lead and Backing Vocals
- Steve Russell - Piano
- Chuckii Booker - Keyboards
- Gerald Albright - Saxophone
- Gregory Cauthen - Percussion

== Charts ==
=== Weekly charts ===
Chart (1992)	Peak position
US Billboard 200	78
US Top R&B/Hip-Hop Albums (Billboard)	21

=== Year-end charts ===
Chart (1992)	Position
US Top R&B/Hip-Hop Albums (Billboard)	51

=== Singles ===
Year	Single	Chart positions	
Year	Single	US	US R&B
1992	"Sweet November"	58	1
1992	"Whatever It Takes (To Make You Stay)"	63	12
