= Sweet November =

Sweet November may refer to:

- Sweet November (1968 film), a romantic comedy-drama film starring Sandy Dennis and Anthony Newley
- Sweet November (2001 film), a remake featuring Keanu Reeves and Charlize Theron
- "Sweet November" (song), which reached the top of the US R&B chart in November 1992
- "Sweet November", a song by SZA from the EP Z, 2014
