= Troop (album) =

Studio album by Troop
- Released: June 7, 1988
- Recorded: 1987–1988
- Genre: R&B, new jack swing
- Length: 48:08
- Label: Atlantic
- Producer: Eddie Levert, Gerald LeVert & Marc Gordon; Chuckii Booker; Attala Zane Giles; Brownmark; Cliff Wright & Zack Harmon; Dennis Nelson & Wayne Vaughn

Troop chronology
Troop (1988)	Attitude (1989)

Singles from Troop
- 1. "Mamacita"; 2. "My Heart"; 3. "Still in Love"

Professional ratings
Review scores
Source	Rating
AllMusic	3/5 stars

Troop is the self-titled first album by new jack swing group Troop. Released on June 7, 1988, the album charted at number nineteen on the US R&B albums chart.

== Track listing ==
1. "Mamacita" (Gerald LeVert, Eddie Levert, Marc Gordon) – 5:37
2. "My Heart" (Chuckii Booker) – 6:09
3. "Still in Love" (Attala Zane Giles, Lawrence McNeil, Steve Russell, Tony Haynes) – 5:08
4. "Happy Relationship" (Brownmark, Keith Woodsom) – 4:23
5. "I Like That" (Gerald LeVert, Eddie Levert, Marc Gordon) – 4:16
6. "Young Girl" (Cliff Wright, Steve Russell, Zack Harmon) – 6:05
7. "She's My Favorite Girl" (Art Zamora, Michael Carpenter) – 5:17
8. "Watch Me Dance" (Dennis Nelson, Lawrence McNeil, Steve Russell, Wayne Vaughn) – 4:50
9. "Mamacita" (Extended 12" Mix) (Gerald LeVert, Marc Gordon) – 6:51

== Charts ==
=== Album ===
Chart (1988)	Peak position
US Billboard Pop Albums	133
US Billboard Top Soul Albums	19

=== Singles ===
Year	Single	Chart positions
Year	Single	US R&B
1988	"Mamacita"	2
1988	"My Heart"	9
1988	"Still in Love"	19
