= Spread My Wings =

Single by Troop

from the album Attitude
- Released: December 13, 1989
- Recorded: 1989
- Genre: R&B, new jack swing
- Length: 4:42
- Label: Atlantic
- Songwriter(s): Chuckii Booker
- Producer(s): Chuckii Booker

Troop singles chronology
| "I'm Not Soupped" (1989) | "Spread My Wings" (1989) | "All I Do Is Think of You" (1990) |

"Spread My Wings" is the title of a number-one R&B single by Troop. As the second single taken from the album Attitude, the song spent two weeks at number one on the U.S. R&B chart.

== See also ==
- R&B number-one hits of 1990 (USA)
