= Temporary Lovers =

Song by The Controllers
- A-side: "Temporary Lovers"
- B-side: "Temporary Lovers (Instrumental)"
- Released: 1989
- Length: 3:56
- Label: Capitol B-44329
- Songwriter: D. Spencer, Jr. - S. Sims
- Producers: Donnell Spencer Jr. and Sam Sims

"Temporary Lovers" (aka "Temporary Lover") was a 1989 single for US group, The Controllers. The song was included on their album that was released the same year.

== Background ==
The song was written by Donnell Spencer and Sam Sims and included on The Controllers' seventh album, Just in Time which was released in 1989. It was produced and arranged by Donnell Spencer, Jr. and Sam Sims for D.S. Coda Productions. It was released in May, 1989.

The video clip for the song was directed by Rupert Wainwright.

=== Credited musicians ===
- Drums (programming) - Donnell Spencer
- Guitar - Allen Hinds
- Keyboards - Donnell Spencer
- Keyboards - Sam Sims
- Programming - Donnell Spencer
- Background Vocals - Sam Sims
- Background Vocals - Donnell Spencer
- Background Vocals - Darrell Coleman

.

== Reception ==
As mentioned in the April 7 issue of BRE Magazine, Tony Brown of WBLX-FM in Mobile, Alabama said that the record was something different this time but had the same adult flavoring which would attract a younger audience. He also mentioned that it would satisfy the loyal following of the group.

== Airplay ==
Significant action for the single was reported by Radio & Records in the publication's March 17 issue, noting light adds on a variety of radio stations.

The March 31 issue of The Gavin Report had thirty three reports and seven adds for the song on the Up & Coming list.

== Chart ==
By May 12, 1989, the single had been in the BRE Singles Chart for eight weeks when it reached its peak position at No. 46. The single made its debut at No. 77 on the Cash Box Top R&B Singles chart on the week of April 8, 1989. It peaked at No. 53 the week of April 22, where it spent two weeks at that position.

For the week of May 13, 1989, the single debuted in the Airplay section at No. 39 of the Billboard Hot Black Singles chart. It peaked at No. 89 on the main Billboard chart that year.
