= Dallas Austin =

American musician, songwriter, record producer (born 1970)

- Born: Dallas L. Austin; December 29, 1970 (age 55); Columbus, Georgia, U.S.
- Genres: Pop; R&B; hip-hop
- Occupations: Record producer; songwriter; film producer
- Instruments: Keyboards, drums, harmonica, guitar
- Years active: 1989–present
- Labels: Rowdy, Limp Records, FREEWORLD
- Website: www.dallasaustin.com

Dallas L. Austin (born December 29, 1970) is an American songwriter, record producer, and film producer from Columbus, Georgia.

== Biography ==
=== Early life ===
During a 2019 interview with DJ Vlad, Dallas Austin detailed previously unknown or unconfirmed events involving his life and career. Austin, who is of African American heritage, was born in Columbus, Georgia and graduated from Columbus High School. His mother and father owned a night club called “The Party Club”, where Austin would play instruments and DJ’d during the day time. After his father died, Austin’s mother moved her family and her restaurant/nightclub downtown and lived next door to the restaurant.

As a child, Austin became interested in music at the age of 7 and asked his mother to buy him a keyboard. She was initially reluctant because she thought he would become bored and quickly move on to a different interest. In order to convince his mother to make the purchase, he proposed she initially buy him a small machine. In addition, he successfully negotiated terms for obtaining new instruments: if he continued to make progress with learning how to use the machines she purchased, she would buy him larger, more intricate keyboards on a yearly basis.

As young men, Austin’s two brothers were frequently in and out of jail. When he was a teenager, one of his brothers threw a keyboard across his bedroom. This upset Austin greatly, as he felt music was his way out of the environment in which his family lived, and ended up as a defining moment in Austin’s life. He felt that he could no longer continue living in Columbus and boarded a bus to Atlanta with the intention of living with his aunt. In order to keep their family together, his mother decided to move as well, although it took several months before she and Austin’s brothers could join. After she saved money and began working in an Atlanta restaurant, the family was able to reunite; however, the Ku Klux Klan were a persistent presence in the neighborhoods in which the family lived.

=== Career ===
Austin got his start in the music industry when his manager William "Vybe Chyle" Burke introduced him to his business partner, Klymaxx member Joyce Irby. Joyce was the "way out" Dallas had been looking for. She enlisted as an exclusive producer for her company Diva One Productions. Though Joyce believed in Dallas' ability, the record labels didn't see it the same way. Irby and Burke went from label to label shopping Austin's work but they just couldn't hear it. Joyce was determined that the world would hear Dallas Austin. In 1989, she scored a solo deal with Motown Records and had 3 charted Billboard singles, most notably "Mr. DJ" with Doug E. Fresh, which was co-produced by Dallas, peaking at No. 2. Finally, there was a real breakthrough. Austin went on to produce the songs "My Music" and "I Will Always Love You" for Troop's 1989 album Attitude. When he was starting out as a producer, he would frequent a local skating rink and records that he produced would be played over the sound system; T-Boz, his future collaborator of TLC fame, was also a frequent patron. He used to take his keyboard to school with him, but his mother expressed annoyance at this, telling his school guidance counselor that she did not feel his production career would work out, but the counselor told her that because Austin had kept at his hobby for so long (it was his eleventh grade year), then perhaps it would indeed work out, and suggested that Austin's mother back him. His mother, upon hearing this from a third party, agreed to support Austin. Austin, who was nearly finished with his compulsory education, expressed his wish to stop attending school. His mother, though not pleased with this, allowed him to do so. He spent a large amount of his time at the aforementioned skating rink, where the owners had built a studio for an Atlanta production collective, Organized Noize. All of this was around 1986.

In 1990, Austin branched out on his own. His work on Motown led him to work on albums by other acts signed to the label - the first being the little known group Glasswurk. Austin later helmed the bulk of the debut albums for the Motown signees Another Bad Creation and Boyz II Men. When he telephoned Joyce Irby to say that he was to work with Boyz II Men, she told him that she was going to "[sue] everybody" and immediately thereafter hung up the phone. Austin initially did not understand why she said this, but would later find out that it was because he was considered a "work for hire" employee of Irby. He consulted a lawyer and the lawyer said that although the employment contracts to which he was a party were not favorable to him, they were fair enough so he advised Austin to keep working under them. Irby did not sue anybody and everything worked out as Austin was, as aforementioned, able to produce on the debut Boyz II Men record. When DJ Vlad asked Austin why he only produced one song on Boyz II Men's second album, he said it was because he "didn't like them" after the first album. He said in turn that this was because the members had ostensibly become vain since their success had begun, paraphrasing them emphasizing costly tangibles with statements such as "Man [...] I can't finish counting the diamonds in my Rolex right now.", and "we gotta let somebody win [referring to music industry awards] this year; good thing we're not there."

Austin was later recruited by L.A. Reid and Babyface to work on a couple of projects for their record label, LaFace Records. The duo recruited him to work on the debut album for TLC. From there, he was granted a deal for his short-lived group Highland Place Mobsters, which was Austin joining Theophilus "Chip" Glass of Glasswurk who were formerly signed to Motown. through Joyce Irby's Diva One Productions.

After his success with other acts, Austin was recruited by After 7 to produce a few songs on their second album, Takin' My Time. Austin then worked with Madonna on her 1994 album Bedtime Stories. In the 2000s, Austin worked with pop acts and produced hit singles like TLC's "Unpretty", Pink's songs "Don't Let Me Get Me" and "Just Like a Pill", and Gwen Stefani's 2004 single "Cool".

In 2014 Austin appeared on The Ellen DeGeneres Show as a co-host.

In 2025, Austin was announced as one of the remixers for the 2026 FIFA World Cup theme, representing Atlanta.

== Personal life ==
Austin has three children, including a son, Tron Austin, born in 1997 to TLC singer Chilli and a niece, whom he helped raise after the death of his brother, Claude Austin, in 1994.

== Record labels founded by Dallas Austin ==
- Rowdy Records: Founded by Austin in 1992. The label was distributed by Arista Records and later, Motown Records when it was reactivated in 2005. Artists signed to the label were Illegal, Da King & I, Y'all So Stupid and Monica. Later artists during the reactivation include Colin Munroe and Da Backwudz. Rock act Fishbone signed to Rowdy after being dropped from Columbia Records. Revived in 2020, its current acts include Jussie Smollett.
- Limp Records: A short-lived label founded by Austin in 1993 and distributed by EMI Records. Only two albums were issued by the label: A View to a Kill by Shadz of Lingo and The Pendulum Vibe by Joi.
- Freeworld Entertainment: A short-lived label founded by Austin in 1998 and distributed by Capitol Records. Released "Forty Six & 2", the fourth single from Tool's 1996 album Ænima. Two artists were signed to the label: singer Lysette and teenage singer Sammie, who released his debut From the Bottom to the Top in 2000. After Freeworld folded, Sammie released his follow-up album several years later on Austin's other label Rowdy Records.

== Recording studio ==
Austin owned a personal recording studio named D.A.R.P., an acronym for "Dallas Austin's Recording Projects in which Alvin Speights was his primary mixing engineer." It was later renamed UAMG Studios, short for "Urban Angels Music Group."
