= Mayday (Troop album) =

Studio album by Troop
- Released: June 16, 1998
- Genre: R&B, pop, urban, soul, new jack swing
- Label: Warrior, Koch

Troop chronology
A Lil' Sumpin' Sumpin' (1994)	Mayday (1998)	The Return (2014)

Singles from Mayday
- 1. "The Way I Parlay" Released: 1998; 2. "Round and Round" Released: 1998; 3. "Girl I Can Talk to You" Released: 1998

Mayday is the fifth studio album by new jack swing group Troop released by Warrior Records on June 16, 1998. It also the first album in six years, featuring all five returning members.

== Track listing ==
=== Standard edition ===
1. "The Way I Parlay" —
2. "A Melody" —
3. "Round and Round" —
4. "Something About You" —
5. "Over the Moon" —
6. "I Take It Back" —
7. "Girl Can I Talk to You" —
8. "The Audacity" —
9. "Don't Worry Your Mind" —
10. "Fly Away" —
11. "I Love Only You" —
12. "If It's All Right with You"
13. "Let Your Light Shine" — 4:33
14. "I Want What You Got" —
15. "So in Love" — 3:56
16. "May Day" — 4:17

=== Interlude and intro version ===
1. "Ntro" — 0:49
2. "Troop Invasion" — 0:57
3. "Round and Round" —
4. "Something About You" —
5. "The Way I Parlay" —
6. "Over the Moon" —
7. "The Discovery" —
8. "I Take It Back" —
9. "Girl Can I Talk to You" —
10. "The Decision (Interlude)" —
11. "The Audacity" —
12. "Don't Worry Your Mind" —
13. "The Scandal (Interlude)" — 0:46
14. "Fly Away" —
15. "A Melody" —
16. "I Love Only You" —
17. "Let Your Light Shine" —
18. "So in Love" — 3:56
19. "The Twist (Interlude)" — 0:40
20. "May Day" — 4:17
