= Niice 'n Wiild =

Studio album by Chuckii Booker
- Released: August 1992
- Recorded: 1992
- Genre: New jack swing
- Length: 74:10
- Label: Atlantic
- Producer: Chuckii Booker

Chuckii Booker chronology
Chuckii (1989)	Niice 'n Wiild (1992)

Niice 'n Wiild is the second and final studio album by the Los Angeles, California-based singer/producer Chuckii Booker.

== Reception ==
Professional ratings
Review scores
Source	Rating
AllMusic	4.4/5 stars

Released in August 1992, the album charted number 13 on the R&B Album Charts.

== Track listing ==
- All Songs Written By Chuckii Booker, except as noted.
1. "Spinnin'" (4:04)
2. "Love Is Medicine" (5:26)
3. "Out of the Dark" (Booker, Donnell Spencer, Jr.) (4:33)
4. "You Don't Know" (6:11)
5. "With All My Heart" (4:54)
6. "I Giit Around" (7:14)
7. "Games" (Booker, Gerald Levert, C.J. Anthony) (5:26)
8. "Deep C Diiver" (Booker, Raymond A. Shields, II) (6:25)
9. "Front Line" (5:47)
10. "Soul Triilogy I" (Booker, Derek Organ, Tommy Organ) (3:46)
11. "Soul Triilogy II" (Booker, Derek "D.O.A." Allen) (1:49)
12. "Soul Triilogy III" (Booker, Derek "D.O.A." Allen) (2:18)
13. "Niice n' Wiild" (Booker, Derek Organ) (5:25)
14. "I Should Have Loved You" (5:40)
15. "For Lovers Only" (5:27)

== Charts ==
=== Album ===
Chart (1992)	Peak position
Billboard Top Soul Albums	13

=== Singles ===
Year	Single	Chart positions	
Year	Single	US	US R&B
1992	"Games"	68	1
1993	"I Should Have Loved You"	-	38
