= I Will Always Love You (Troop song) =

Single by Troop

from the album Attitude
- Released: November 20, 1990
- Recorded: 1989
- Genre: R&B; new jack swing
- Length: 5:06
- Label: Atlantic
- Songwriter(s): Dallas Austin; Joyce Irby; Steve Russell
- Producer(s): Dallas Austin; Joyce Irby

Troop singles chronology
"That's My Attitude" (1990)	"I Will Always Love You" (1990)	"Whatever It Takes (To Make You Stay)" (1992)

"I Will Always Love You" is a song performed by American contemporary R&B group Troop, issued as the fifth and final single from the group's second studio album Attitude. Co-written by co-lead singer Steve Russell, the song peaked at #31 on the Billboard R&B chart in 1991.

== Chart positions ==
Chart (1991)	Peak position
US Hot R&B Singles (Billboard)	31
