= Stay (The Controllers album) =

Studio album by The Controllers
- Released: 1986
- Genre: Boogie, R&B
- Label: MCA
- Producer: Galen Senogles, Ralph Benatar, Barry J. Eastmond; Beau Huggins and Jimmy Bee (Executive producers)

The Controllers chronology
The Controllers (1984)	Stay (1986)	For the Love of My Woman (1987)

Stay is a 1986 album by American R&B band The Controllers. It was produced by the band's member Barry J. Eastmond in collaboration with Galen Senogles and Ralph Benatar, and released by MCA Records.

The album subsequently went on the charts, peaking at number 25 on the Black Albums chart, making it the most successful R&B album of their career. This album also spanned two R&B singles, "Distant Lover" and their title track "Stay", which was a moderate hit in the UK.

== Track listing ==
^{All songs written by Barry Eastmond, V.J. Smith, except where noted.}

Side 1
No.	Title	Length
1.	"Distant Lover" (M. Gaye, G. Fuqua, S. Greene)	4:47
2.	"Stay"	5:43
3.	"So Glad"	5:04
4.	"Bad Bad Jama"	4:48

Side 2
No.	Title	Length
5.	"My Secret Fantasy" (R. Benatar, G. Senogles, K. Pinto)	4:35
6.	"Breakout the Love" (B. Eastmond, J. Skinner)	4:50
7.	"Deep in Love"	4:20
8.	"Got a Thang" (K. Keys, R.A. Brown, B. Eastmond)	5:11

== Chart positions ==
Chart (1986)	Peak position
US R&B Albums	25

=== Singles ===
Year	Single	Peak chart positions	
Year	Single	U.S. R&B	UK
1986	"Distant Lover"	23	—
1986	"Stay"	12	77
"—" denotes releases that did not chart or was not released.
