= Oops, Oh No! =

Single by Cerrone and La Toya Jackson
- Released: 21 April 1986
- Genre: Dance-pop
- Length: 3:50
- Label: Palass Records, Music of Life
- Songwriters: Cerrone, Donnell Spencer, Nick Mundy
- Producer: Simon Harris (Remix)

Cerrone singles chronology
"Where You Are" (1985)	"Oops, Oh No!" (1986)	"Way In" (1990)

La Toya Jackson singles chronology
"Imagination" (1986)	"Oops, Oh No!" (1986)	"(Ain't Nobody Loves You) Like I Do" (1987)

Cover for Jackson's solo version

"Oops, Oh No!" is a single by French singer Cerrone and American singer La Toya Jackson. It was released in 1986 as a 7" and 12" single. The song was remixed by British producer Simon Harris in 1986 and was the second release on his Music of Life label.

== Song information ==
Cerrone initially contacted Jackson's management with a song called "Talk to Me", which Jackson declined as it sounded too much like something her sister Janet would record. "Talk To Me" was later released by Chico DeBarge. Cerrone offered Jackson “Oops” which she preferred as it was a "funky and danceable" track with a clever title.

"Oops, Oh No!" held the number 89 position on Billboard's Black Singles Chart for a fortnight from the week ending November 22 to the week ending November 29, 1986.

In 1991, the song was remixed without Cerrone's vocals in the Netherlands and was released under Jackson's name only. It peaked at #41 on the Dutch pop charts and #30 on Dutch dance charts. This re-release project probably came to life due to Jackson's huge popularity in the Netherlands in 1991. No official release was scheduled at that time, so the remix was quickly produced by a small Dutch record label.

== Charts ==
Chart (1986)	Peak position
U.S. Billboard Black Singles Chart	89
US Cash Box Black Contemporary Singles	88
Chart (1991)	Peak position
Dutch Top 40	41
Dutch Mega Dance Top 30	30

== Mixes ==
=== 1986 version ===
- Oops Oh No! (Single version) 4:10
- Oops Oh No! (Full 12" version) 5:35
- Oops Oh No! (Instrumental version) 4:12
- Oops Oh No! (Dub version) 3:45
- Oops Oh No! (A cappella version) 0:40
- Oops Oh No! (LP version) 4:10

=== 1991 version ===
- Short version (La Toya version only)
- The Ultimate Mix (La Toya version only)
- The Piano (La Toya version only)
- The Rhythm (La Toya version only)
