= Chuckii =

Studio album by Chuckii Booker
- Released: May 11, 1989
- Recorded: 1988–1989
- Genre: New jack swing
- Length: 41:00:00 (LP version); 31:00:00 (CD version)
- Label: Atlantic
- Producer: Chuckii Booker

Chuckii Booker chronology
Chuckii (1989)	Niice 'n Wiild (1992)

Singles from Chuckii
- 1. "Turned Away" Released: April 27, 1989

Chuckii is the debut album by the Los Angeles, California-based R&B/soul singer/musician/producer Chuckii Booker. Booker performed all of the vocals and instrumentation on the album, with the exception of the album's biggest hit, "Turned Away", which featured backing vocals from co-writer Donnell Spencer, Jr., and "Oh Lover", which features Gerald Albright on saxophone.

The CD version of the album includes an additional track, "Keep Your Guard Up", which feature's Booker's mother, Selestine Booker, on the piano.

== Reception ==
Professional ratings
Review scores
Source	Rating
AllMusic	4/5 stars

Released in May 1989, the album featured three successful singles, with the first, "Turned Away", topping the R&B charts and placing at number 42 on the Pop Charts. The follow-up singles "(Don't U Know) I Love You" and "Touch" peaked at number 4 and number 13, respectively, on the R&B chart.

== Track listing ==
All songs written by Chuckii Booker, except "Turned Away" and "Res Q Me" co-written by Booker and Donnell Spencer, Jr.

1. "(Don't U Know) I Love You" (4:30)
2. "Turned Away" (4:36) ^
3. "Res Q Me" (4:25)
4. "Hotel Happiness" (4:00)
5. "Heavenly Father" (5:14)
6. "Touch" (3:40)
7. "That's My Honey" (4:30)
8. "Let Me Love U" (4:12)
9. "Oh Lover" (6:24)
10. "Keep Your Guard Up" (4:34) +
11. Turned Away (Extended 12" Version) 7:18 +
12. Turned Away (Chuckii's Mix) 6:13 +

^ Although "Turned Away" is listed with a length of 4:36 on the Chuckii LP album sleeve, the actual length is approximately 9 to 10 seconds longer (4:45). The version of "Turned Away" appearing on some CD versions of the Chuckii album extends certain choruses and musical interludes, increasing the length of the song by nearly a full minute (5:44). (Several other tracks from Chuckii received similar extended treatment on these CD versions.)

+ The final three tracks only appear on the CD version of the album

== Performers ==
- Chuckii Booker - all vocals and instruments, except as noted below
- Donnell Spencer Jr. - backing vocals on "Turned Away"
- Gerald Albright - saxophone on "Oh Lover"
- Selestine Booker - piano on "Keep Your Guard Up"

== Charts ==
=== Album ===
Chart (1989)	Peak position
Billboard Pop Albums	116
Billboard Top Soul Albums	18

=== Singles ===
Year	Single	Chart positions	
Year	Single	US	US R&B
1989	"Turned Away"	42	1
1989	"(Don t U Know) I Love U"	-	4
1989	"Touch"	-	13
