= A Lil' Sumpin' Sumpin' =

Studio album by Troop
- Released: July 22, 1994
- Studio: The Plant Studios, Sausalito
- Genre: R&B, pop, urban, soul, new jack swing
- Length: 61:48
- Label: Bust It
- Producer: Demetrius A. "Mech" Shipp

Troop chronology
Deepa (1992)	A Lil' Sumpin' Sumpin' (1994)	Mayday (1998)

Singles from A Lil' Sumpin' Sumpin'
- 1. "Do Me" Released: 1994; 2. "Get Loose" Released: 1994; 3. "Poohnany" Released: 1995

A Lil' Sumpin' Sumpin' is the fourth studio album by new jack swing group Troop released by Bust It Records on July 22, 1994. It is also the only album that includes just three members.

== Track listing ==
1. "Let's Get Warm" — 6:23
2. "Break a Dawn" — 5:42
3. "Poohnany (Remix)" — 4:16
4. "Blowin' My Mind" — 4:48
5. "Get It On" — 6:30
6. "Get Loose" — 6:21
7. "Around" — 4:44
8. "That's the Way" — 6:03
9. "Miss U" — 5:16
10. "Got Me Goin'" — 4:33
11. "Do Me" — 4:30
12. "Sumpin' to Ride Too" — 2:46
