= Turned Away =

Single by Chuckii Booker

from the album Chuckii
- B-side: "Keep Your Guard Away"
- Released: 1989
- Genre: New jack swing
- Length: 4:45 (original LP version; incorrectly listed as 4:36); 4:10 (Edit); 5:45 (CD version); 7:18 (Extended Mix); 6:13 (Chuckii's Mix)
- Label: Atlantic
- Songwriters: Chuckii Booker, Donnell Spencer, Jr.
- Producer: Chuckii Booker

Chuckii Booker singles chronology
"Turned Away" (1989)	"(Don't U Know) I Love U" (1989)

"Turned Away" is a 1989 debut single by singer/songwriter Chuckii Booker. The single went to number one the Billboard R&B singles chart for one week and peaked at number forty-two on the Hot 100.

== Music video ==
The official music video was directed by Jane Simpson.

== Charts ==
=== Weekly charts ===
Chart (1989)	Peak position
US Billboard Hot 100	42
US Hot R&B/Hip-Hop Songs (Billboard)	1

=== Year-end charts ===
Chart (1989)	Position
US Hot R&B/Hip-Hop Songs (Billboard)	23
