= The Controllers (R&B band) =

American soul and R&B vocal group

- Origin: Birmingham, Alabama, United States
- Genres: Soul, R&B
- Years active: 1974–1997
- Labels: Juana (1977-1980); CMP (Private label/1982); MCA (1984-1987); Capitol (1989); Malaco (1997)
- Members: Lenard Brown
- Past members: Rickey Lewis; Larry McArthur; Reginald McArthur

The Controllers are an American soul and R&B vocal group, originally from Birmingham, Alabama, who had a series of successful recordings in the late 1970s and the 1980s.

== Career ==
Originally part of an eight-member gospel group, the group became four in number by the time they entered junior high school, comprising Reginald McArthur (baritone lead), Rickey Lewis (tenor lead), Larry McArthur and Lenard Brown. Their growing reputation in the Birmingham area led to an introduction to Cleveland Eaton, bassist for the Ramsey Lewis Trio. Under Eaton's guidance, the Soul Controllers, as they were then called, recorded their first single, called "Right on Brother, Right On". It became a regional hit while they were still attending Fairfield High School.

In 1976, the group came to the attention of Juana Records, run by Frederick Knight, also from Birmingham. Recording at the Malaco Studios in Jackson, Mississippi, their first single on Juana charted, but it was their second release, "Somebody's Gotta Win, Somebody's Gotta Lose", that established them. The song, a ballad lasting over eight minutes on the album, climbed to number 8 on US Billboard R&B chart, and number 3 on the Cash Box soul chart in 1977, (#103 BB Pop chart). The group's on-stage performances also helped them to open for Ray Charles, Nancy Wilson, B.B. King and the Temptations.

A follow-up ballad, "Heaven Is Only a Step Away" climbed to number 37 R&B, but despite the release of two more albums on Juana, the group failed to find another major single success.

In 1983, the group signed with the late Jimmy Bee, a San Francisco-based manager, and got a recording contract with MCA Records. Their first release on the label, "Crushed" (which featured Stevie Wonder on harmonica) returned them to the charts, reaching number 30 R&B, in 1984 and two years later, "Stay" climbed to number 12. Their cover version of the Marvin Gaye song, "Distant Lover" also proved popular. These hits led to a series of appearances on Soul Train and performances at the Radio City Music Hall and Carnegie Hall. During this time, the group also performed on MTV, BET's Video Soul and on HBO.

Under the guidance of Bee, the Controllers made a move to Capitol Records in 1989 for the album Just in Time, which was co-produced by Donnell Spencer, Jr., Sam Sims, Ollie E. Brown and Vassal Benford. It failed to produce any top 40 hits but rekindled their popularity among the group's loyal following. However, two songs from the album did chart. The Donnell Spencer composition, "Temporary Lovers" got to no. 43 on the Billboard R&B chart and another song "Just in Time" which was co-composed by Spencer and Sims got to no. 87.

After a break from touring and recording, the four returned in the late 1990s, and joined Malaco Records for their self-produced album, Clear View, which contained a cover of Stevie Wonder's "Superstition", and a revised "Somebody's Gotta Win".

Lenard Brown and Reginald McArthur were co-hosts of a syndicated talk show in the Southeastern United States, Inside the Juke Joint, where artists, songwriters, arrangers and musicians talk about their careers and lives.

Reginald McArthur (born Reginald Duwayne McArthur on September 25, 1954) died on April 19, 2018, at age 63.

== Discography ==
=== Albums ===
Year	Title	US R&B
1977	In Control	—
1978	Fill Your Life with Love	—
1979	Next in Line	47
1984	The Controllers	47
1986	Stay	25
1987	For the Love of My Woman	72
1989	Just in Time	—
1997	Clear View	—
"—" denotes releases that did not chart.

=== Singles ===
Year	Title	Peak chart positions		
Year	Title	US Dance	US R&B	UK
1976	"The People Want Music"	—	82	—
1976	"This Train"	—	—	―
1977	"Somebody's Gotta Win, Somebody's Gotta Lose"	—	8	—
1978	"Heaven Is Only One Step Away"	―	37	―
1978	"If Somebody Cares"	—	65	—
1979	"I Can't Turn the Boogie Loose"	42	90	—
1980	"Let Me Entertain You"	84	—	—
1980	"We Don't"	―	43	―
1981	"I Gambled on Your Love and Lost"	―	―	—
1981	"My Love Is Real"	―	76	―
1984	"Crushed"	―	30	―
1986	"Distant Lover"	―	34	―
1986	"Stay"	―	12	77
1986	"Break Out the Love"	―	—	―
1987	"Sleeping Alone"	―	24	―
1988	"Play Time"	―	69	―
1989	"Temporary Lovers"	―	43	―
1989	"I Wanna Be with U (Right Now)"	―	—	―
1989	"Just in Time"	―	87	―
"—" denotes releases that did not chart or were not released in that territory.
