= Donnell Spencer Jr. =

- Also known as: Donnell Spencer
- Born: Philadelphia, United States
- Genres: Jazz, funk, R&B
- Occupation: Musician
- Instruments: Drums, keyboards, vocals

Donnell Spencer Jr. is a session musician, drummer and award-winning composer. He has worked with or toured with Patti Austin, Anita Baker, El De Barge, Chaka Khan, and Jody Watley. He has been associated musically with mainstream films Running Scared and Without You I'm Nothing. As a composer, his work had created hits such as "Oops, Oh No!" by Cerrone & La Toya Jackson, "Say You Really Want Me" by Kim Wilde, "Take Your Time" by "Pebbles, "Temporary Lovers" by The Controllers, "Turned Away" by Chuckii Booker, "Until the End of Time" by Freddie Jackson and more.

== Background ==
Originally from Philadelphia, Spencer is a drummer, producer, singer, songwriter. He is also a photographer who has had his work published.

Two of his compositions have won him the John Lennon Songwriter's award. His song, "Turned Away", co-written with musician/songwriter/producer Chuckii Booker, was a no. 1 solo hit for Booker on the Billboard R&B chart.

Spencer's status as an award-winning musician and chart-topping songwriter has been noted by Blues Blast Magazine. He has composed at least nine national chart hits.

In addition to Patti Austin, Anita Baker, El De Barge, Chaka Khan, and Jody Watley, he has been associated in either a performing or recording capacity with Jonathan Butler, Brian Culbertson, Kenny G, Boney James, Ray Parker Jr. and Stevie Wonder. He has also played with John Legend and Teddy Pendergrass.

He has recorded as a solo artist with the singles, "True Love" in 2019 and "Come On" in 2020. He played on Johnny Adams' final album, Man Of My Word which was released in 1998.

Via his work as a photographer, he has made contributions to Style & Society magazine, The Scoop LA. and The Press & Sun-Bulletin and pressconnects.com. etc.

Earlier in his musical career, he was in an ensemble called MYX with Michael and Danny Sembello.

== Session musician, composer, producer ==
With Nick Mundy and Cerrone, he co-wrote the song, "Oops, Oh No!" which was a hit for Cerrone and La Toya Jackson in 1986.

=== Work with the Sembello brothers ===
With Danny Sembello and Dick Rudolph, he wrote the song, "Say You Really Want Me" which was a 1987 hit for Kim Wilde. It got to no. 46 in the Billboard pop chart and no. 44 in the R&B chart. It also got to no. 29 in the UK.

Spencer and Danny Sembello wrote the song, "Take Your Time" for singer Pebbles. It was released on CA 53362 and a hit prediction in the July 2, 1988 issue of Billboard. It got to no. 3 on the US R&B chart.

He would work with Both Michael and Danny on the Controllers' 1989 album.

=== Work with Sam Sims ===
Working with Sam Sims, Spencer co-composed three songs which were all hits on the R&B chart from 1989 to 2006.

The Controllers

Also in 1989, another composition of his, "Temporary Lovers" by The Controllers was a hit. It made it to no. 43 on the US R&B chart. With Sam Sims, he co-wrote "Just in Time" for The Controllers. He also produced the single which was released on Capitol l B-44414. Reviewed by Billboard, it was said to be a seductive R&B ballad ripe for quiet storm programming. They also wrote "We’re Back". He co-produced their album with Sims for D.S. Coda Productions. He also sang backing vocals, playing drums and keyboards. The Sembello's also played on the album.

Gerald Albright

Spencer and Sims both played on the song "Growing With Each Other" which was on Gerald Albright's Dream Come True album that was released in 1990.

Freddie Jackson

Spencer and Sims composed "Second Time for Love" (1991) and "Until the End of Time" (2006) for Freddie Jackson. Both were hits on the R&B chart making no. 81 and no. 44 respectively.

Other work with Sims

He mastered Sims' 2022 album, All of Me and played on the song from the album, "Q Reficio" which was recorded earlier.

=== Other artists ===
He co-wrote the song, "Turned Away" for Chuckii Booker which was a hit in 1989.

He worked on Rick Braun's 1998 album, Full Stride. He co-wrote the song "Nightfall" and played drums and keyboard on that track.

== Backing ==
On February 3, 2016, Spencer and bassist Sam Sims were part of Jody Watley's backing band and played at The Roxy in February.

Spencer played drums on Brigitte Purdy song "Blues Angel" which is the single from her Still I Rise album that was released in 2018.

In late 2019, he was the drummer in Judith Hill's band.

As of 2023, Spencer has been part of Ayline Artin's backing band.

== Solo career ==
In 1997, Spencer appeared in an episode of The Young and the Restless.

In 2022, Spencer released the single, "Over U".

== See also ==
- Category:Songs written by Donnell Spencer, Jr.
