= Games (Chuckii Booker song) =

Song by American R&B singer Chuckii Booker

Single by Chuckii Booker

from the album Niice 'n Wiild
- Released: October 1992
- Recorded: 1992
- Genre: R&B
- Length: 5:26 (Album version); 4:13 (Radio edit)
- Label: Atlantic
- Songwriters: Chuckii Booker, Gerald Levert, C.J. Anthony
- Producer: Chuckii Booker

Chuckii Booker singles chronology
| "Touch" (1989) | "Games" (1992) | "I Should Have Loved You" (1993) |

"Games" is a song by American R&B singer Chuckii Booker, from his second studio album Niice 'n Wiild. The single spent one week at number-one on the U.S. Billboard Hot R&B/Hip-Hop Songs chart and peaked at number sixty-eight on the US Billboard Hot 100. It was sampled in "Return of the Mack" by Mark Morrison in 1996.

== Charts ==
=== Weekly charts ===
| Chart (1992) | Peak position |
|---|---|
| US Billboard Hot 100 | 68 |
| US Hot R&B/Hip-Hop Songs (Billboard) | 1 |
| US Cash Box Top 100 | 63 |

=== Year-end charts ===
| Chart (1992) | Position |
|---|---|
| US Hot R&B/Hip-Hop Songs (Billboard) | 42 |

| Chart (1993) | Position |
|---|---|
| US Hot R&B/Hip-Hop Songs (Billboard) | 52 |

== See also ==
- List of number-one R&B singles of 1992 (U.S.)
