= Sweet November (song) =

Song by Troop

from the album Deepa
- Released: 1992
- Genre: R&B
- Label: Atlantic
- Songwriter: Babyface
- Producer: Steve Russell

"Sweet November" is a number-one R&B single originally recorded by group The Deele and later covered by group Troop, written by Babyface. Troop's cover spent one week at number one on the US R&B chart and peaked at fifty-eight on the Billboard Hot 100.

The Deele, which included Babyface at the time, released the original version in 1985 as a part of the album Material Thangz.

== See also ==
- List of number-one R&B singles of 1992 (U.S.)
