= All I Do Is Think of You =

Single by the Jackson 5

from the album Moving Violation
- A-side: "Forever Came Today"
- Released: October 1975
- Recorded: February 1975
- Studio: Motown Recording Studios, Hollywood, California
- Genre: Rhythm and blues, soul
- Length: 3:15
- Label: Motown
- Songwriter(s): Michael Lovesmith; Brian Holland
- Producer(s): Michael Lovesmith

The Jackson 5 singles chronology
"Forever Came Today" (1975)	"All I Do Is Think of You" (1975)	"Enjoy Yourself" (1976)

"All I Do Is Think of You" is a song released by the Jackson 5 on the Motown label in 1975. It was initially released as the B-side to the group's single "Forever Came Today" before being released as an A-side single months later. The song is the final charted single by the group before they left Motown for Epic Records in 1976.

In 1990, R&B group Troop had a No. 1 hit on the R&B chart with their version of the song.

== Overview ==
The song was written by Michael Lovesmith and Brian Holland (formerly of the popular songwriting team of Holland-Dozier-Holland). The lyrics are from the viewpoint of a boy talking about how he fell in love with a girl at his school, and how he is always thinking about her.

The song was originally issued as a B-side to the Jackson 5's disco version of the Supremes' "Forever Came Today" in June 1975. That month, the group announced that they would leave Motown for Epic Records, however, they still remained under contract to Motown until March 1976. Jermaine Jackson, the song's second co-lead vocalist, left the group and remained with Motown, with Randy Jackson officially replacing him.

"All I Do Is Think of You" was gaining airplay on urban radios and was issued as a single in October 1975. It peaked at No. 50 on the Billboard Hot Soul Singles chart. The group later performed the song on shows without Jermaine, including Soul Train and The Mike Douglas Show.

Record World described the song as "a moving love ballad incorporating [the Jackson 5's] distinctive blend and a sitar sound."

== Personnel ==
- Michael Jackson: lead vocals
- Jermaine Jackson: co-lead vocals, spoken part
- Jackie Jackson, Tito Jackson and Marlon Jackson: background vocals
- Produced by Michael Lovesmith & Brian Holland

== Troop version ==
In 1989, New jack swing/contemporary R&B group Troop released a cover version on their album, Attitude. Produced by Chuckii Booker, their version was released by Atlantic Records and reached number-one on the R&B singles chart on June 30, 1990. It peaked at No. 47 on the Billboard Hot 100.

In 2018, Billboard magazine ranked Troop's version No. 46 on their list of The 100 Greatest Boy Band Songs of All Time, calling their rendition "near-definitive; with its lush, layered harmonies, gauzy production, and molasses-slow sway, imbuing every lyric with the rose-colored daydreaminess you'd expect from a song with this title and chorus."

=== Personnel ===
- Troop (John Harreld, Allen McNeil, Reggie Warren, Rodney Benford, Steve Russell): vocals
- Derek Organ: drums (overdubs)
- Chuckii Booker: all other instruments

== See also ==
- R&B number-one hits of 1990 (USA)
