= Troop (band) =

American R&B group

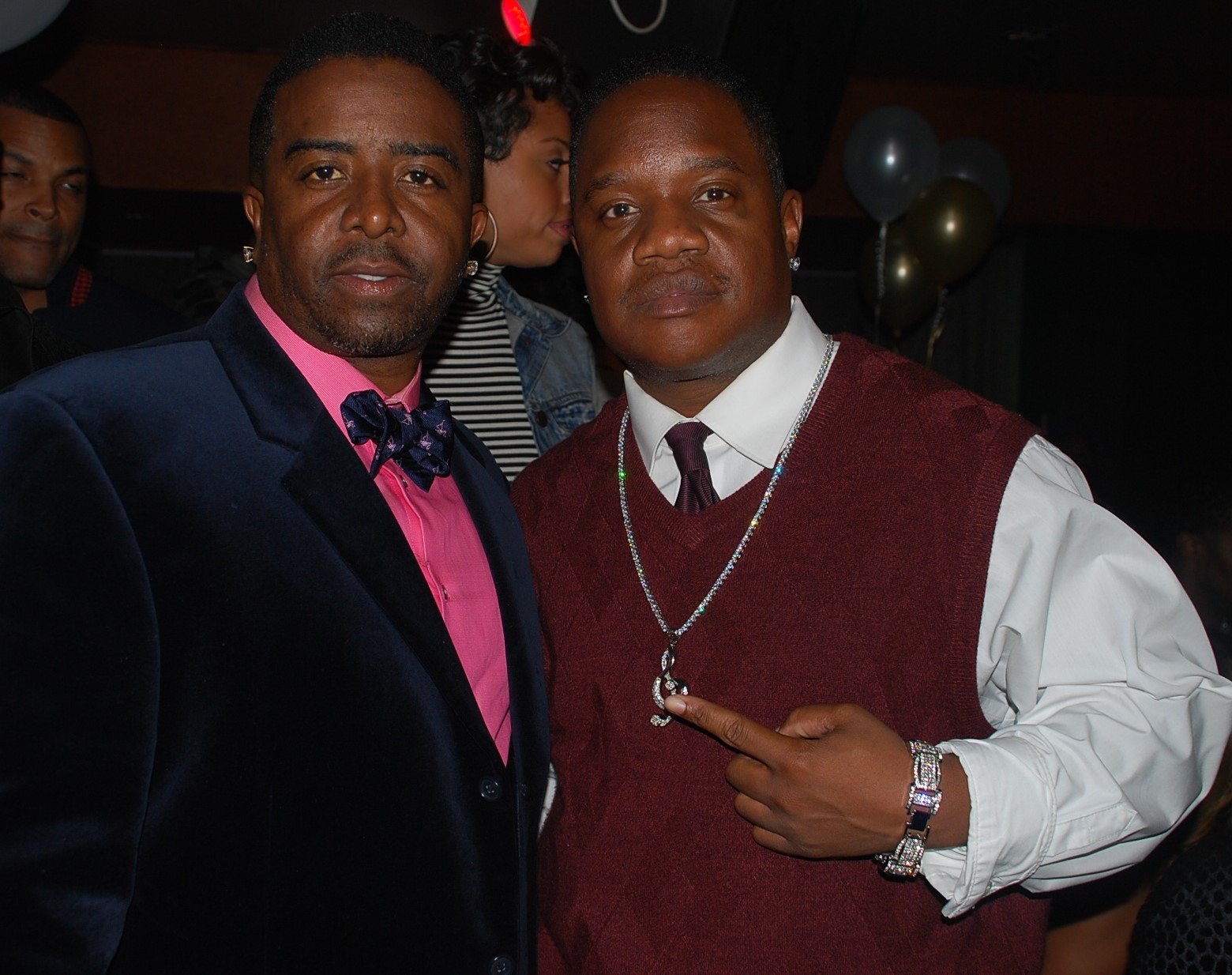
- Two members of Troop 2015: Steve Russell (left) and John Harreld (right)

Background information
- Origin: Pasadena, California, U.S.
- Genres: R&B, new jack swing
- Years active: 1987–present
- Labels: Atlantic; Bust It; Warrior
- Members: Steve "Random" Russell; John "Jon Jon" Harreld; Rodney Benford; Allen McNeil
- Past members: Reggie Warren (deceased)

Troop is an American R&B group from Pasadena, California, United States. The group has had three number-one singles and ten top-ten singles on the Billboard R&B Singles chart. They have also completed five albums, which include three certified gold and one certified platinum album. TROOP is an acronym for "Total Respect of Other People". The group is most notable for a series of number-one R&B hits, including popular cover versions of the songs "All I Do Is Think of You", originally performed by The Jackson 5 and "Sweet November", originally performed by musical group The Deele (written by Babyface). They also had a number-one hit with the original song "Spread My Wings".

== Career ==
The group got its start in the late 1980s after they won a televised Puttin' on the Hits talent contest that later drew interest from record labels. Troop, consisting of childhood friends Steve Russell, Allen McNeil, John Harreld, Rodney Benford, and Reggie Warren, soon signed to Atlantic Records and released their debut single "Mamacita" from their self-titled debut album in 1988. "Mamacita" reached Number 2 on the Billboard's R&B Chart.

Troop's second album Attitude included the hit singles "Spread My Wings" and "All I Do Is Think of You" (a Jackson 5 cover), which were both number one on the Billboard R&B singles chart, and remained in the top 10 for several weeks. Attitude was certified platinum in 1990. Their third album Deepa was released in 1992, from which the single "Sweet November" made number one on the Billboard R&B singles chart. The group followed up Deepa with two more albums, A Lil' Sumpin' Sumpin' (1994) and Mayday (1998), both of which were re-released in 2005.

After the release of Mayday in 1998, Troop took a hiatus as individual members worked behind the scenes on various writing and producing projects, collaborations, and other business endeavors.

In 2004, Troop regrouped and began touring the United States and finishing up their sixth album. Since returning, Troop has headlined a number of shows and also shared the stage with artists they had toured with in the past, such as Boyz II Men, Brian McKnight, Keith Sweat, Silk, Mario, and Jon B.

Troop have also been showcased on The Late Show with David Letterman, Soul Train, The Arsenio Hall Show, It's Showtime at the Apollo, and appeared in the feature film New Jack City singing a cappella. Additionally, the group appeared on the New Jack City soundtrack with Queen Latifah and Levert, in a medley featuring cover versions of the O'Jays' "For the Love of Money" and Stevie Wonder's "Living for the City".

In October 2006, Troop contacted the internet radio station The Mixx and have worked together to make The Mixx the radio home of Troop. Russell dubs the singing voices of several minor characters (among them doo-wop singer Little Albert and the five brothers who make up the Jackson 5 pastiche "The Campbell Connection") in the 2006 film version of the Broadway musical Dreamgirls. Steve Russell also wrote "Take You Down" for Chris Brown, "No Air" for Jordin Sparks, and the Grammy Award-winning "Invisible" for Jennifer Hudson. In February 2010, he released his debut solo CD titled So Random, which is the first release from his own label Motel Music Media. Allen McNeil released his debut solo album Hybernation in January 2010. Allen McNeil released his sophomore solo album Send For Me in November 2011. In addition to releasing music, Allen McNeil is said to have been auditioning for acting roles and accepting scripts. In 2014, John "Jon Jon" Harreld announced that he would be working on a solo project, and released a single covering Luther Vandross' "Never Too Much", which should also appear on the project.

Reggie Warren died on March 14, 2021, after an extended illness. He was 52.

== Discography ==
=== Studio albums ===
Year	Album details	Peak chart positions		Certifications
Year	Album details	US	US R&B	Certifications
1988	Troop: Release date: June 7, 1988; Label: Atlantic	133	19	
1989	Attitude: Release date: October 20, 1989; Label: Atlantic	73	5	RIAA: Gold
1992	Deepa: Release date: June 2, 1992; Label: Atlantic	78	21	
1994	A Lil' Sumpin' Sumpin': Release date: July 22, 1994; Label: Bust It	—	80	
1998	Mayday: Release date: June 16, 1998; Label: Warrior	—	99	
2016	Mayday 2K17: Release date: Sept 3, 2016; Label: Motel Music Media	_		
"—" denotes a recording that did not chart or was not released in that territory.

Compilations

Year	Album Details	Chart position	Certification
Year	Album Details	US R&B	Certification
2019	Troop Collected: March 8, 2019; Label: Warner Music Group	-	

=== Singles ===
Year	Single	Peak chart positions			Album
Year	Single	US	US R&B	NZ	Album
1988	"Mamacita"	—	2	—	Troop
1988	"My Heart"	—	9	—	Troop
1988	"Still in Love"	—	19	—	Troop
1989	"I'm Not Soupped"	—	19	—	Attitude
1990	"Spread My Wings"	—	1	27	Attitude
1990	"All I Do Is Think of You"	47	1	45	Attitude
1990	"That's My Attitude"	—	14	—	Attitude
1991	"I Will Always Love You"	—	31	—	Attitude
1992	"Whatever It Takes (To Make You Stay)"	63	12	46	Deepa
1992	"Sweet November"	58	1	—	Deepa
1993	"Give It Up"	—	—	—	Deepa
1994	"Do Me"	—	78	—	A Lil' Sumpin' Sumpin'
1995	"Get Loose"	—	—	—	A Lil' Sumpin' Sumpin'
1995	"Poohnany"	—	—	—	A Lil' Sumpin' Sumpin'
1998	"The Way I Parlay"	—	65	—	Mayday
2013	"Forever"	—	—	—	Non-album single
2014	"Not In A Million Years"	—	—	—	The Return
2014	"Santa Can You Help Me?"	—	—	—	Non-album single
2015	"Pick Up Yo Money"	—	—	—	The Return
2017	"I Know"	—	—	—	Non-album single
2023	"So In Love"	—	—	—	Non-album single
2023	"Lady (In My Life)"	—	—	—	Non-album single
"—" denotes a recording that did not chart or was not released in that territory.

==== Featured singles ====
Year	Single	Chart position	Album
Year	Single	US R&B	Album
1991	"For the Love of Money" / "Living for the City" (medley) (with LeVert featuring Queen Latifah)	12	New Jack City
