= Chuckii Booker =

American singer-songwriter

- Born: Eugene Allen Booker Jr. December 19, 1962 (age 63); Los Angeles, California, U.S.
- Origin: Los Angeles, California, U.S.
- Genres: R&B; new jack swing
- Occupations: Musician; producer; bandleader
- Instruments: Vocals; bass; guitar; keyboards
- Years active: 1983–present
- Label: Atlantic

Eugene Allen Booker Jr. (born December 19, 1962), known professionally as Chuckii Booker, is an American producer, singer, songwriter, multi-instrumentalist and bandleader from Los Angeles, California.

A child prodigy, Booker was signed by his godfather Barry White to White's production company in 1984 and spent three years as a keyboardist for the R&B group Tease. He later submitted a demo tape to Atlantic Records to showcase his production abilities, but the label was drawn to his vocal performance on the tape's B-side and offered him a solo recording deal. His 1989 debut album Chuckii yielded the single "Turned Away", which reached number two on the Billboard R&B chart. His cousin is R&B singer Karyn White.

== Early life ==
Booker was born in Los Angeles, California on December 19, 1962.

== Career ==
Booker emerged in the late 1980s as an urban contemporary R&B artist and producer. He began recording the music after being signed by his godfather, Barry White, to his production company in 1984. Later, he played keyboards with the short-lived Epic Records band Tease for three years.

Booker received his recording contract in an unlikely manner. He gave his demo tape to the manager of Gerald Albright to showcase his skills as a musician, but had forgotten about the songs on the other side of the tape that contained original songs with his vocals. As a result, he was offered a recording contract with Atlantic Records.

Booker signed a recording contract with Atlantic to release his debut album Chuckii in 1989 in which he played all the instruments and sang all vocals. The album fared well on the strength of hit singles "(Don't U Know) I Love U" and the #1 R&B single "Turned Away". The follow-up and its final studio album to date (as of 2024) Niice 'N Wiild was released in 1992 and yielded another chart-topping R&B hit "Games". After the release of Niice 'N Wiild, Booker retired from recording music.

Booker produced for several recording artists throughout the years, including Troop, which yielded two #1 singles ("All I Do Is Think of You" & "Spread My Wings"), his godfather Barry White, Janet Jackson, Vanessa Williams, Demetrius Ross, Kool & the Gang and many more. He was the musical director, producer and keyboardist for Janet Jackson's Rhythm Nation World Tour as well as the opening act. Booker got the gig after he was invited by Jackson to the premiere of her long-form video Janet Jackson's Rhythm Nation 1814. Although Booker went to the premiere to mingle with celebrities, he was caught off guard when Jackson asked him after the screening to be her musical director for the tour.

Booker has produced records for artists such as Lalah Hathaway, Troop, En Vogue, Angela Winbush, Diana Ross, Anastacia, Commissioned, Rihanna, Lionel Richie, Stevie Wonder, and Bette Midler.

He has a net worth of $3 million.

== Discography ==
=== Albums ===
Tease (as keyboardist and songwriter):

- 1986: Tease (Epic)

As solo artist:

| Year | Title | Label | Chart positions | |
| Year | Title | Label | US R&B | US |
|---|---|---|---|---|
| 1989 | Chuckii | Atlantic | 18 | 116 |
| 1992 | Niice 'n Wiild | Atlantic | 13 | — |
"—" denotes releases that did not chart.

=== Singles ===
| Year | Title | Chart positions | |
| Year | Title | US R&B | US Pop |
|---|---|---|---|
| 1989 | "That's My Honey" | — | — |
| 1989 | "Touch" | 13 | — |
| 1989 | "(Don't U Know) I Love U" | 4 | — |
| 1989 | "Turned Away" | 1 | 42 |
| 1992 | "Games" | 1 | 68 |
| 1992 | "I Should Have Loved You" | 38 | — |
| 1993 | "With All My Heart" | — | — |
"—" denotes releases that did not chart.
