= Boyz II Men discography =

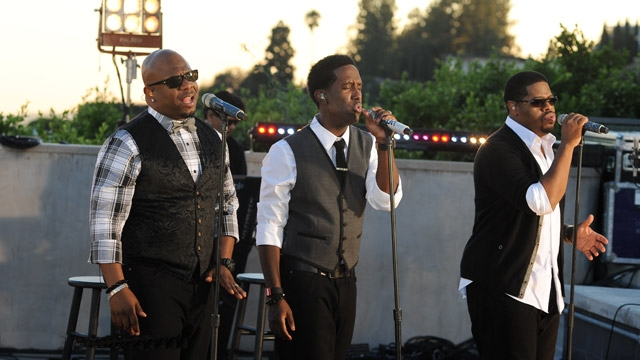
- Studio albums: 15
- Compilation albums: 9
- Singles: 36
- Guest singles: 4

This is the discography of R&B and pop vocal group Boyz II Men. Boyz II Men have sold 25 million albums in the United States alone.

== Albums ==
=== Studio albums ===
List of albums, with selected chart positions and certifications
Title	Album details	Peak chart positions											Certifications
Title	Album details	US	US R&B	AUS	CAN	FRA	GER	JP	NL	SWE	SWI	UK	Certifications
Cooleyhighharmony	Released: April 30, 1991; Label: Motown; Format: LP, CD, cassette	3	1	4	11	—	38	—	16	35	—	7	RIAA: 9× Platinum; ARIA: 2× Platinum; BPI: Gold; MC: Platinum
Christmas Interpretations	Released: October 5, 1993; Label: Motown; Format: LP, CD, cassette	19	6	—	6	—	—	—	—	—	—	—	RIAA: 2× Platinum; MC: Gold
II	Released: August 30, 1994; Label: Motown; Format: LP, CD, cassette	1	1	4	3	—	18	—	7	20	21	17	RIAA: 12× Platinum; ARIA: 2× Platinum; BPI: Gold; MC: 5× Platinum
Evolution	Released: September 23, 1997; Label: Motown; Format: LP, CD, cassette	1	1	6	2	7	8	—	7	25	20	12	RIAA: 2× Platinum; ARIA: Gold; BPI: Silver; MC: 2× Platinum
Nathan Michael Shawn Wanya	Released: September 12, 2000; Label: Universal; Format: CD, cassette	4	3	18	16	23	24	—	41	—	49	54	RIAA: Gold; MC: Gold
Full Circle	Released: June 11, 2002; Label: Arista; Format: CD, cassette	10	5	73	29	40	29	—	—	—	69	56	
Throwback, Vol. 1	Released: August 24, 2004; Label: Koch, MSM; Format: CD, digital download	52	8	—	—	—	—	—	—	—	—	—	
Winter/Reflections	Released: December 1, 2005 (Japan only); Label: MSM, Urban; Format: CD, digital download	—	—	—	—	—	—	17	—	—	—	—	
The Remedy	Released: October 25, 2006; Label: Koch, MSM; Format: CD, digital download	—	—	—	—	—	—	16	—	—	—	—	
Motown: A Journey Through Hitsville USA	Released: November 13, 2007; Label: Decca; Format: CD, digital download	27	6	—	—	29	—	29	—	—	—	8	
Love	Released: November 24, 2009; Label: Decca; Format: CD, digital download	114	14	—	—	—	—	62	—	—	—	54	
Covered: Winter	Released: December 22, 2010; Label: MSM, Rhythm Zone; Format: CD, digital download	—	—	—	—	—	—	88	—	—	—	—	
Twenty	Released: October 25, 2011; Label: MSM, Benchmark; Format: CD, digital download	20	4	—	—	—	—	52	—	—	—	63	
Collide	Released: October 21, 2014; Label: BMG, MSM; Format: CD, digital download	37	6	—	—	—	—	—	—	—	—	—	
Under the Streetlight	Released: October 20, 2017; Label: Tango, MasterWorks, MSM; Format: CD, digital download	—	—	—	—	—	—	149	—	—	—	—	
"—" denotes items that did not chart or were not released.

=== Compilation albums ===
List of albums, with selected chart positions and certifications
Title	Album details	Peak chart positions				Certifications
Title	Album details	US	US R&B	AUS	UK	Certifications
The Remix Collection	Released: November 7, 1995; Label: Motown; Format: CD	17	15	39	—	RIAA: Platinum; MC: Gold
Extras	Released: May 22, 1996; Label: Motown; Format: CD	—	—	—	—	
The Ballad Collection	Released: May 9, 2000; Label: Universal; Format: CD	—	—	—	—	
Legacy: The Greatest Hits Collection	Released: October 30, 2001; Label: Universal, Motown, Chronicles; Format: CD, cassette	89	37	94	2	RIAA: Gold; BPI: 2× Platinum
20th Century Masters – The Millennium Collection: The Best of Boyz II Men	Released: October 7, 2003; Label: Motown; Format: CD, digital download	70	84	—	—	
Best Selection	Released: 2009; Label: Motown; Format: CD, digital download	—	—	—	—	
The Best of Boyz II Men: Green Series	Released: November 25, 2005; Label: Format: CD, digital download	—	—	—	—	
End of the Road – The Collection	Released: September 19, 2011; Label: Universal, UMC, Spectrum; Format: CD, digital download	—	—	—	—	
Icon	Released: 2013; Label: Motown; Format: CD, digital download	—	—	—	—	
"—" denotes items that did not chart or were not released.

== Singles ==
Single	Year	Peak chart positions									Certifications	Album
Single	Year	US	US Pop	US R&B	AUS	CAN	FRA	NL	NZ	UK	Certifications	Album
"Motownphilly"	1991	3	—	4	32	—	—	29	38	23	RIAA: Platinum	CooleyHighHarmony
"It's So Hard to Say Goodbye to Yesterday"	1991	2	—	1	100	36	—	21	3	—	RIAA: Platinum	CooleyHighHarmony
"Uhh Ahh"	1991	16	—	1	180	—	—	—	—	—		CooleyHighHarmony
"Please Don't Go"	1992	49	—	8	191	—	—	—	3	—		CooleyHighHarmony
"End of the Road"	1992	1	1	1	1	3	7	1	1	1	RIAA: 4× Platinum; ARIA: Platinum; BPI: Platinum; RMNZ: 2× Platinum	Boomerang: Original Soundtrack Album
"In the Still of the Nite (I'll Remember)"	1993	3	2	4	11	23	24	—	1	27	RIAA: Platinum	Album Inspired by The Jacksons: An American Dream Mini Series
"Let It Snow" (featuring Brian McKnight)	1993	32	—	17	96	—	—	—	—	—	RIAA: Gold	Christmas Interpretations
"I'll Make Love to You"	1994	1	1	1	1	1	2	6	1	5	RIAA: 4× Platinum; ARIA: Platinum; BPI: Platinum; RMNZ: Platinum	II
"On Bended Knee"	1994	1	1	2	7	1	34	21	4	20	RIAA: 3× Platinum; RMNZ: Platinum	II
"Thank You"	1995	21	15	17	33	32	27	—	17	26		II
"Water Runs Dry"	1995	2	2	4	36	4	—	—	19	24	RIAA: Platinum	II
"Vibin'"	1995	56	—	27	—	—	—	—	—	—		II
"I Remember"	1995	46	—	30	59	—	—	—	31	—		The Remix Collection
"4 Seasons of Loneliness"	1997	1	9	2	13	8	—	11	2	10	RIAA: Platinum; ARIA: Gold	Evolution
"A Song for Mama"	1997	7	32	1	61	—	—	33	15	34	RIAA: 2× Platinum	Evolution
"Can't Let Her Go"	1998	—	—	—^{[A]}	—	—	71	—	—	23		Evolution
"Doin' Just Fine"	1998	—	—	—^{[B]}	95	—	—	—	—	—	RIAA: Platinum	Evolution
"I Will Get There"	1998	32	—	23	—	—	—	—	—	—	RIAA: Gold	The Prince of Egypt (soundtrack)
"Pass You By"	2000	—	39	27	13	—	73	98	—	—		Nathan Michael Shawn Wanya
"Thank You in Advance"	2000	80	—	40	—	—	—	—	—	—		Nathan Michael Shawn Wanya
"The Color of Love"	2002	—	—	51	—	—	—	—	—	—		Full Circle
"Relax Your Mind" (featuring Faith Evans)	2002	—	—	52	—	—	—	—	—	—		Full Circle
"What You Won't Do for Love"	2004	—	—	60	—	—	—	—	—	—		Throwback, Vol. 1
"The Tracks of My Tears"	2007	—	—	—	—	—	—	—	—	—		Motown: Hitsville USA
"Just My Imagination (Running Away with Me)"	2008	—	—	83	—	—	—	—	—	—		Motown: Hitsville USA
"War"	2008	—	—	—	—	—	—	—	—	—		Motown: Hitsville USA
"Mercy Mercy Me"	2008	—	—	—	—	—	—	—	—	—		Motown: Hitsville USA
"I Can't Make You Love Me"	2009	—	—	75	—	—	—	—	—	—		Love
"Iris"	2009	—	—	—	—	—	—	—	—	—		Love
"More Than You'll Ever Know" (featuring Charlie Wilson)	2011	—	—	59	—	—	—	—	—	—		Twenty
"One Up for Love"	2011	—	—	—	—	—	—	—	—	—		Twenty
"Flow"	2011	—	—	—	—	—	—	—	—	—		Twenty
"One More Dance"	2012	—	—	—	—	—	—	—	—	—		Twenty
"Better Half"	2014	—	—	—	—	—	—	—	—	—		Collide
"Diamond Eyes"	2014	—	—	—	—	—	—	—	—	—		Collide
"Losing Sleep"	2014	—	—	—	—	—	—	—	—	—		Collide
"Ladies Man"	2017	—	—	—	—	—	—	—	—	—		Under the Streetlight
"I Love the One" (with Lady A)	2026	—	—	—	—	—	—	—	—	—		The Chosen – Inspired By (Seasons 1-5)

"—" denotes releases that did not chart

=== Guest singles ===
Single	Year	Artist	Peak chart positions								Certification	Album
Single	Year	Artist	US	US Pop	US R&B	AUS	FRA	NL	NZ	UK	Certification	Album
"One Sweet Day"	1995	Mariah Carey	1	1	2	2	5	2	1	6	RIAA: 4× Platinum; ARIA: 3× Platinum; BPI: Gold; RMNZ: Platinum	Daydream
"Hey Lover"	1995	LL Cool J	3	—	3	11	—	—	—	17		Mr. Smith
"Buddha"	2016	Tech N9ne, Adrian Truth	—	—	—	—	—	—	—	—		The Storm
"One More Try"	2017	Bell Biv DeVoe	—	—	—	—	—	—	—	—		Three Stripes
"If You Leave Me Now"	2018	Charlie Puth	—	—	—	—	—	—	—	—		Voicenotes
"Be Still Moses"	2019	Steep Canyon Rangers, Asheville Symphony	—	—	—	—	—	—	—	—		Be Still Moses

=== Music videos ===
Year	Video	Director
1991	"Motownphilly"	Lionel C. Martin
1991	"It's So Hard to Say Goodbye to Yesterday"	Lionel C. Martin
1992	"Uhh Ahh"	Lionel C. Martin
1992	"End of the Road"	Lionel C. Martin
1993	"Let It Snow" (with Brian McKnight)	Lionel C. Martin
1993	"Silent Night"	Lionel C. Martin
1994	"I'll Make Love to You"	Lionel C. Martin
1994	"On Bended Knee"	Lionel C. Martin
1995	"Thank You"	Lionel C. Martin
1995	"Water Runs Dry"	Wayne Isham
1995	"Vibin'"	Paulo Junqueiro
1995	"One Sweet Day" (with Mariah Carey)	Larry Jordan
1996	"Hey Lover" (with LL Cool J)	Hype Williams
1997	"4 Seasons of Loneliness"	Paul Hunter
1997	"Can't Let Her Go"	Paul Hunter
1997	"A Song for Mama"	Cameron Casey
1998	"Doin' Just Fine"	Christopher Erskin
2000	"Thank You in Advance"	Darren Grant
2000	"Pass You By"	Darren Grant
2002	"The Color of Love"	Little X
2004	"What You Won't Do for Love"	Little X
2012	"One More Dance"	Carl Verna
2014	"Losing Sleep"	Don Tyler

== Notes ==
- A "Can't Let Her Go" did not enter the Hot R&B/Hip-Hop Songs chart, but peaked at number 28 on the Hot R&B/Hip-Hop Airplay chart.
- B "Doin' Just Fine" did not enter the Hot R&B/Hip-Hop Songs chart, but peaked at number 33 on the Hot R&B/Hip-Hop Airplay chart.
