= Shawn Stockman =

American singer (born 1972)

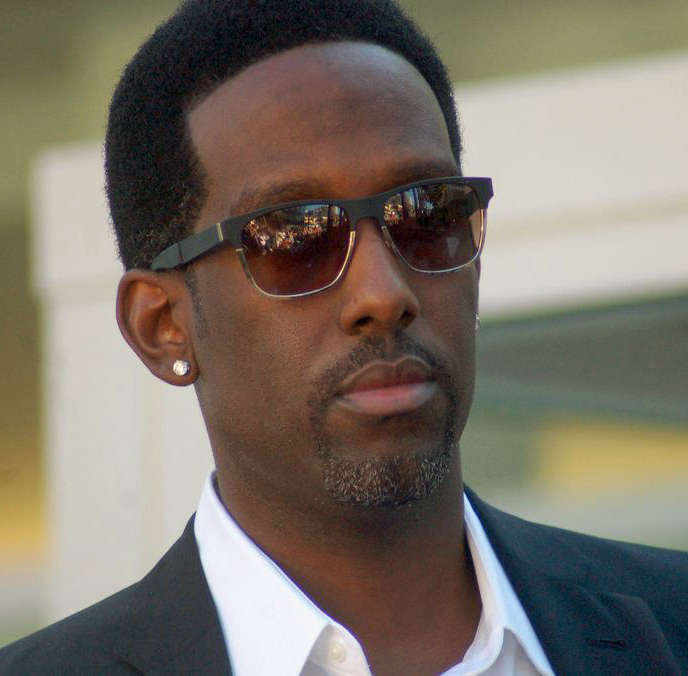
- Stockman in January 2012

Background information
- Also known as: Slim
- Born: Shawn Patrick Stockman; September 26, 1972 (age 53); Philadelphia, Pennsylvania, U.S.
- Genres: R&B; soul; pop; new jack swing
- Occupations: Singer; songwriter; record producer
- Instruments: Vocals; keyboards; guitar
- Years active: 1988–present
- Labels: Motown; Universal; Arista; MSM; Koch; Decca; UMG
- Member of: Boyz II Men
- Website: boyziimen.com

Shawn "Slim" Stockman (Note: According to the Cooleyhighharmony liner notes, each member identifies with a unique nickname, devised from a collaboration with Michael Bivins. Wanyá was "Squirt," Shawn was "Slim," Michael was simply "Bass," and Nathan assumed the name "Alex Vanderpool".) (born September 26, 1972) is an American singer, songwriter and record producer. He is best known as a member of the vocal group Boyz II Men. In addition to Boyz II Men, Stockman was a member of the group Black Men United. He was also a judge on the NBC television show The Sing-Off for five seasons (2009–2014).

== Early life and education ==
Shawn Patrick Stockman, a native of Southwest Philadelphia, started singing with the Philadelphia Boys Choir & Chorale at the age of 8. He attended CAPA (Creative and Performing Arts High School) in South Philadelphia, where he met the other members of Boyz II Men, originally calling themselves Unique Attraction.

== Music career ==
=== Boyz II Men ===
Stockman was recruited to join the R&B vocal group Boyz II Men in 1988, when members George Baldi, Jon Shoats and Marguerite Walker all left the group due to graduating from high school. He was asked to join after the members saw him sing a solo in the school choir. After signing to Motown in 1991, they released their debut album, Cooleyhighharmony. Boyz II Men would quickly start to climb music charts with songs such as; I'll Make Love to You (1994) and Water Runs Dry (1995). In 1996, the group released the single One Sweet Day featuring Mariah Carey. Boyz II Men are best known for their vocal harmonies. Stockman sings tenor vocals in the group.

Stockman still tours with Boyz II Men as of 2023.

=== Later works ===
Stockman recorded a solo album as a side project during the late 1990s, but the LP was never released.

Stockman appeared in the group Black Men United with his group as Boyz II Men, while recording their II album for the hit single "U Will Know" which appeared on the Jason's Lyric soundtrack (1994). He also wrote and sang the song "Visions of a Sunset" for the Mr. Holland's Opus soundtrack (1996).

Stockman wrote the songs "Forever", "Hot Thing" and "Let It Go" (which was played during the Showtime film Seventeen Again). He also recorded a cover version of Beyoncé's hit song "If I Were a Boy", and contributed vocals on the title track of the Foo Fighters album Concrete and Gold (2017).

Stockman started his own record label called Soul Chemistry Projects. He released solo album Forward in 2020, and Forward 2020.

=== The Sing-Off ===
In 2009, it was announced that Stockman would be a judge on the NBC show The Sing-Off. He remained a judge on the show until its cancellation in 2014.

== Personal life ==
Stockman is married to Sharonda Jones. He is the cousin of Atlanta-based neo soul singer Anthony David.

Stockman is an honorary member of Phi Beta Sigma (2021).

== Boyz II Men Discography ==
=== Albums ===
Title	Album details
Cooleyhighharmony	Released: April 30, 1991; Label: Motown; Format: LP, CD, cassette
Christmas Interpretations	Released: October 5, 1993; Label: Motown; Format: LP, CD, cassette
II	Released: August 30, 1994; Label: Motown; Format: LP, CD, cassette
Evolution	Released: September 23, 1997; Label: Motown; Format: LP, CD, cassette
Nathan Michael Shawn Wanya	Released: September 12, 2000; Label: Universal; Format: CD, cassette
Full Circle	Released: June 11, 2002; Label: Arista; Format: CD, cassette
Throwback, Vol. 1	Released: August 24, 2004; Label: Koch, MSM; Format: CD, digital download
Winter/Reflections	Released: December 1, 2005; Label: MSM, Urban; Format: CD, digital download
The Remedy	Released: October 25, 2006; Label: Koch, MSM; Format: CD, digital download
Motown: A Journey Through Hitsville USA	Released: November 13, 2007; Label: Decca; Format: CD, digital download
Love	Released: November 24, 2009; Label: Decca; Format: CD, digital download
Covered: Winter	Released: December 22, 2010; Label: MSM, Rhythm Zone; Format: CD, digital download
Twenty	Released: October 25, 2011; Label: MSM, Benchmark; Format: CD, digital download
Collide	Released: October 21, 2014; Label: BMG, MSM; Format: CD, digital download
Under the Streetlight	Released: October 20, 2017; Label: Tango, MasterWorks, MSM; Format: CD, digital download

=== Singles ===
Year	Single
1991	"Motownphilly"
1991	"It's So Hard to Say Goodbye to Yesterday"
1991	"Uhh Ahh"
1992	"Please Don't Go"
1992	"End of the Road"
1993	"In the Still of the Nite (I'll Remember)"
1993	"Let It Snow" (featuring Brian McKnight)
1994	"I'll Make Love to You"
1994	"On Bended Knee"
1995	"Thank You"
1995	"Water Runs Dry"
1995	"Vibin'"
1995	"I Remember"
1997	"4 Seasons of Loneliness"
1997	"A Song for Mama"
1998	"Can't Let Her Go"
1998	"Doin' Just Fine"
1998	"I Will Get There"
2000	"Pass You By"
2000	"Thank You in Advance"
2002	"The Color of Love"
2002	"Relax Your Mind" (featuring Faith Evans)
2004	"What You Won't Do for Love"
2007	"The Tracks of My Tears"
2008	"Just My Imagination (Running Away with Me)"
2008	"War"
2008	"Mercy Mercy Me"
2009	"I Can't Make You Love Me"
2009	"Iris"
2011	"More Than You'll Ever Know" (featuring Charlie Wilson)
2011	"One Up for Love"
2011	"Flow"
2012	"One More Dance"
2014	"Better Half"
2014	"Diamond Eyes"
2014	"Losing Sleep"
2017	"Ladies Man"
