= Legacy: The Greatest Hits Collection =

Greatest hits album by Boyz II Men
- Released: October 30, 2001
- Recorded: 1990–2000
- Genre: R&B
- Label: Universal
- Producer: Michael Bivins, Dallas Austin, Babyface, Tim & Bob, Jimmy Jam and Terry Lewis

Boyz II Men chronology
Nathan Shawn Michael Wanya (2000)	Legacy: The Greatest Hits Collection (2001)	Full Circle (2002)

Professional ratings
Review scores
Source	Rating
Allmusic	4.5/5 stars
The Rolling Stone Album Guide	3/5 stars

Legacy: The Greatest Hits Collection is a 2001 greatest hits LP for R&B group Boyz II Men, released by Universal Records.

== Track listing ==
=== Original album ===
1. "Motownphilly" from Cooleyhighharmony
2. "It's So Hard to Say Goodbye to Yesterday" from Cooleyhighharmony
3. "End of the Road" from Boomerang and Cooleyhighharmony (reissue)
4. "In the Still of the Nite (I'll Remember)" from The Jacksons: An American Dream Original Soundtrack and Cooleyhighharmony (reissue)
5. "Hey Lover" (LL Cool J featuring Boyz II Men) LP version from LL Cool J's Mr. Smith
6. "I'll Make Love to You" from II
7. "On Bended Knee" from II
8. "Water Runs Dry" from II
9. "One Sweet Day" (Mariah Carey & Boyz II Men) from the Mariah Carey LP Daydream
10. "Doin' Just Fine" from Evolution
11. "4 Seasons of Loneliness" from Evolution
12. "A Song for Mama" from Evolution and Soul Food soundtrack
13. "Pass You By" from Nathan Michael Shawn Wanya

International bonus tracks

14. A Rose and a Honeycomb

15. Thank You

Japan bonus track

15. Thank You in Advance

16. Thank You

=== Deluxe edition ===
Disc one - Original Album
14. "Please Don't Go" (Bonus Track) from Cooleyhighharmony
15. "Uhh Ahh" (Bonus Track) from Cooleyhighharmony
16. "Thank You" (Bonus Track) from II
17. "Brokenhearted" (Soul Power mix, with Brandy) (Bonus Track) (from the "Brokenhearted" CD Maxi-Single) - 4:30

Disc two - Remixes, Movies & More

1. "Motownphilly" (12" version) (from the "Motownphilly" U.S. Maxi CD Single) - 5:40
2. "Sympin'" (Extended Remix) (from the "Symphin' (Remix)" Maxi CD Single - 5:00
3. "Uhh Ahh" (The Sequel Mix) (from the "Uhh Ahh" CD Maxi-Single)
4. "Thank You" (Moog Flava Mix) (from the "Thank You" U.S. Maxi CD Single)
5. "I'll Make Love to You" (Make Love to You Mix)
6. "On Bended Knee" (Human Rhythm Mix) (from the "On Bended Knee" U.S. Maxi CD Single)
7. "Water Runs Dry" (Strat Mix) (from the "Water Runs Dry" U.S. Maxi CD Single)
8. "Vibin'" (Cool Summer Mellow Mix) (from the "Vibin'" U.S. Maxi CD Single)
9. "I Remember" (from the "I Remember" CD Single) - 4:41
10. "Doin' Just Fine" (Soul Solution Radio Version)
11. "Can't Let Her Go" (Timbaland Remix) (from the "Can't Let Her Go" CD Maxi-Single)
12. "Visions of a Sunset" (Shawn Stockman solo from Mr. Holland's Opus)
13. "Your Home Is in My Heart" (Stella's Love Theme, with Chanté Moore) (Single Edit) (from How Stella Got Her Groove Back)
14. "I Will Get There" (Inspirational Version) (from The Price of Egypt [Inspirational])
15. "Not Me" (from Elton John & Tim Rice's "Aida")
16. "So Amazing" (from the score to the motion picture The Hurricane)
17. "It's So Hard to Say Goodbye to Yesterday" (Legacy Deluxe Edition Version) (Exclusive) - 4:05

== Charts ==
=== Weekly charts ===
Chart (2001–2002)	Peak position
Australian Albums (ARIA Charts)	94
German Albums (Offizielle Top 100)	36
Japanese Albums (Oricon)	7
Scottish Albums (OCC)	53
UK Albums (OCC)	2
UK R&B Albums (OCC)	1
US Billboard 200	89
US Top R&B/Hip-Hop Albums (Billboard)	37

=== Year-end charts ===
Year-end chart performance for Legacy: The Greatest Hits Collection
Chart (2002)	Position
Canadian R&B Albums (Nielsen SoundScan)	144
UK Albums (OCC)	67

== Certifications ==
Region	Certification	Certified units/sales
Japan (RIAJ)	Gold	100,000^{^}
New Zealand (RMNZ)	Gold	7,500^{‡}
United Kingdom (BPI)	2× Platinum	600,000^{*}
United States (RIAA)	Gold	500,000^{^}
^{*} Sales figures based on certification alone.^{^} Shipments figures based on certification alone.^{‡} Sales+streaming figures based on certification alone.
