= Michael McCary =

American singer (born 1971)

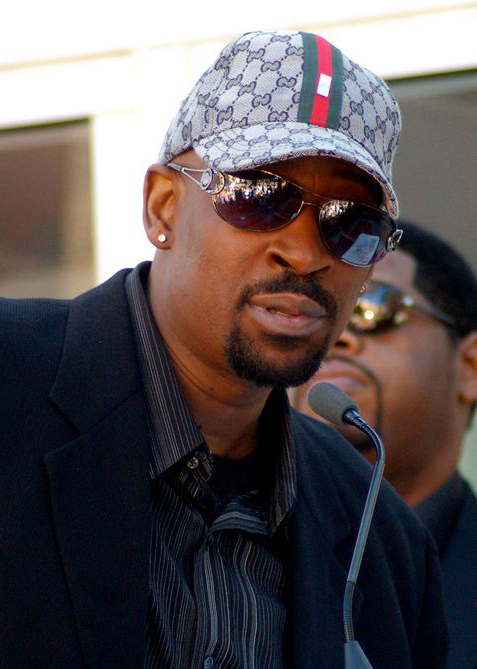
- McCary in January 2012

Background information
- Also known as: Bass; Mike Bass
- Born: Michael Sean McCary; December 16, 1971 (age 54); Philadelphia, Pennsylvania, U.S.
- Genres: R&B; soul; pop; new jack swing
- Occupations: Singer; producer; songwriter
- Instrument: Vocals
- Years active: 1988–2003; 2025–present
- Labels: Motown; Universal; Arista; MSM; Koch; Decca; UMG
- Formerly of: Boyz II Men; Black Men United

Michael "Bass" McCary (born December 16, 1971) is an American musician known for being the former bass singer of the R&B group Boyz II Men, in which he was sometimes known as Mike Bass. He started having back spasms and was diagnosed with multiple sclerosis during his time with the group. He continued singing with the group despite his illness until his departure in 2003. The group has stated they fired McCary because he missed shows. Since 2024, McCary has occasionally joined the group onstage. McCary is also a producer and songwriter, having worked on songs for artists such as Johnny Gill and Keith Martin.

== Early life ==
Michael Sean McCary was born on December 16, 1971. Raised by a single mother, McCary hailed from Logan, Philadelphia, and attended the Philadelphia High School for the Creative and Performing Arts with Boyz II Men members Nathan Morris, Wanya Morris, and Shawn Stockman.

== Boyz II Men ==
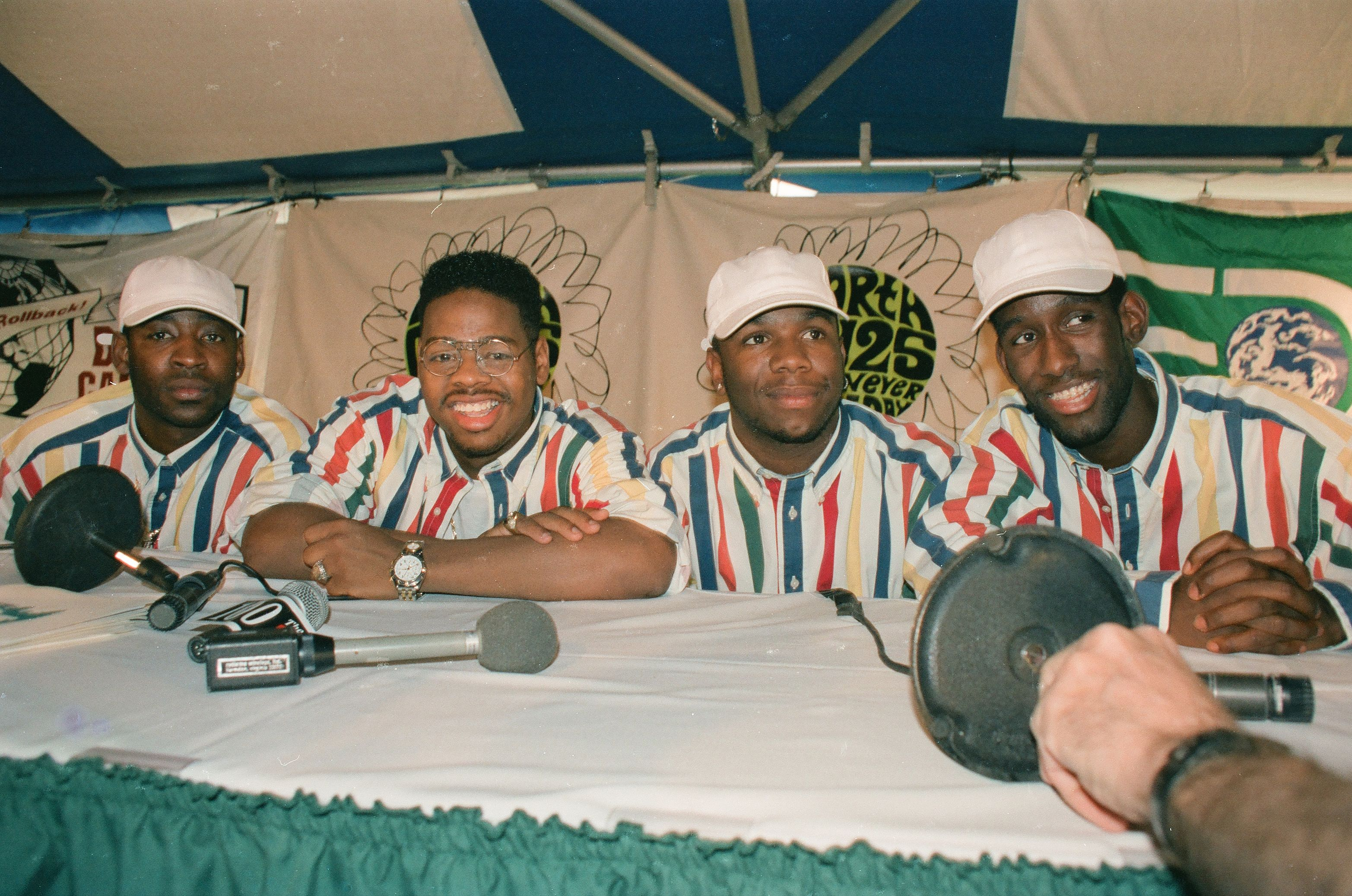
Boyz II Men in 1995.

At one point, McCary encountered Nathan, Wanya, Stockman, and former member Marc Nelson singing in the school bathroom, and harmonized with them, after which McCary became the group's bass singer. In May 1989, the group snuck backstage while Bell Biv DeVoe was performing at the Philadelphia Civic Center and sang to Michael Bivins, who then agreed to represent them. McCary was given the nickname Bass. (Note: According to the Cooleyhighharmony liner notes, each member identifies with a unique nickname, devised from a collaboration with Michael Bivins. Wanyá was "Squirt," Shawn was "Slim," Michael was simply "Bass," and Nathan assumed the name "Alex Vanderpool".) (Note: McCary was also referred to as Mike Bass.) At his mother's advice, McCary remained in school to study accounting and prelaw. In 1991, Boyz II Men released their debut album, Cooleyhighharmony, which sold 7 million copies. After its success, McCary discontinued his accounting education. Boyz II Men would quickly start to climb music charts with songs such as "End of the Road" (1992) and "I'll Make Love to You" (1994).

=== Multiple sclerosis and departure ===
"I stopped trusting the brothers when I was about 29. I went through a depression, and it just started to separate me more. [...] They knew I had all the symptoms of MS, still, but they didn't know MS. Giving it a label wouldn't have changed the symptoms.”

— Mike McCary on Iyanla: Fix My Life

McCary had back spasms, which later went "full scale" when he was 22 years old. Reviews of the group's shows in 1998 describe McCary as having a "back injury" (Daily Bruin), and state that he "sat most of the time with a sore back" (Deseret News). In 2004, Nathan stated that during the album campaign for Full Circle, the group did shows without McCary because his back would not let him perform. At age 28, McCary was diagnosed with multiple sclerosis, but he kept the diagnosis a secret until 2016 when he disclosed his diagnosis on Iyanla: Fix My Life. The diagnosis also stated that he has a locked nerve "around the sciatica" that could sever and cause paralysis. McCary stated that the disease also made him fall into depression. Beforehand, McCary's official reason for his departure in 2003 had been scoliosis, with Wanya stating in 2005 that five years prior they discovered McCary had a severe case: "At some point a bone grew into one of his nerves. We'd be on a tour bus or at sound check and all of a sudden he would start to have an attack."

External videos
- Nathan Morris talks McCary's departure on the Tom Joyner Morning Show.
- Shawn Stockman talks about McCary on the Tammi Mac Late Show.

While news reports in 2004 attributed McCary's exit to a back problem, with Stockman having said that McCary left the group voluntarily and the group thought it was best for him to prioritize his health and that McCary was happy, the group has since stated that they fired McCary. In 2014, Nathan stated McCary "didn’t show up for shows or recordings" and that "he took it for granted" which led to his exit. He also stated that McCary "didn't like rehearsals or any of the nitty gritty stuff that comes along with being a top music act." In 2016, Wanya said that while McCary had "back issues" that "could have been fixed", the group had to fire McCary because he "stopped coming to work", and that McCary was unhappy about their decision. In a podcast interview in 2021, Stockman stated that McCary had developed scoliosis, and the group had to accommodate his condition. However, Stockman said that McCary started missing shows and stopped answering their calls, until McCary heard about an upcoming show in Japan which Stockman described as a "big payday". Stockman stated that McCary showed up at Wanya's house, asking when they would go to Japan, to which Stockman replied, "We ain't going nowhere." Stockman said that they then fought, and McCary slammed Stockman on a table and repeatedly tried to punch Stockman, after which McCary was fired from the group. In April 2026, in a conversation with Bell Biv DeVoe in his podcast On That Note, Stockman added that the rest of the group was tired of McCary, and that he pleaded with McCary to come to work. Stockman stated that McCary missing their show in Romania was the "straw that broke the camel's back", viewing it as "disrespectful": "We got to fly into fucking Eastern Europe with a promoter we never did work with before that may have us trapped in the fucking country. [...] 'I didn't pay for three, I paid for four.'" Stockman also added that while McCary had a "really bad back issue", there were "things that just weren't adding up", such as him not being able to ride a plane but being able to take a "4 or 5, 6-hour drive" with a G-wagon. On Iyanla: Fix My Life in 2016, McCary told host Iyanla Vanzant that the group abandoned him, and that he wanted to move on from it. He described his experience with the group as "betrayal, a broken bond", and stated that they no longer speak.

=== Subsequent reunions ===
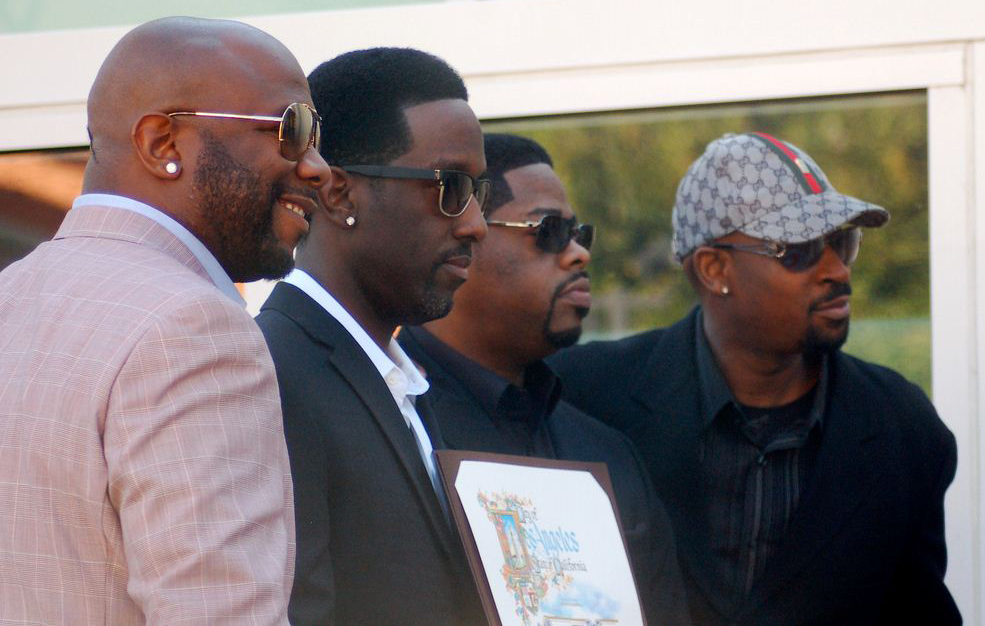
January 5, 2012. McCary stands with Boyz II Men as the group receives a star on the Hollywood Walk of Fame.

In 2011, McCary was set to appear on the group's retrospective anniversary album Twenty, but was not featured in the record. Nathan stated that they approached McCary for the record, but said that McCary "just completely got lazy" and did not want to put effort to reunite with them. He recorded McCary's bass parts. In 2012, McCary stated his interest in returning to the group, but declined to sign a contract that provided protection for the other three members should he exit the group. Nathan stated that the contractual agreement was to ensure "he was going to be there for everything." He also said that McCary changed his mind because he would not be a "full" fourth member.

"You've seen the four of us join back together. Needless to say, we good. And I want everybody to know that. Yes, we went through all of those things. We had our little struggles and beefs or whatever you wanna call it. But at the end of the day, we're still brothers.”

— Shawn Stockman, 2026

On August 30, 2024, McCary came onstage at the penultimate show of Boyz II Men's Las Vegas concert residency, and told the audience the possibility of a future reunion: "It's coming, and I love these guys." A year later, at the group's August 9, 2025 show in Vegas, McCary performed with Boyz II Men for the first time since leaving the group in 2003, performing "In the Still of the Nite" and "I'll Make Love to You". In 2026, McCary joined Boyz II Men at the New Edition Way Tour stops in Las Vegas, Philadelphia, and Houston, during which he performed "End of the Road" for the first time since his departure from the group.

== Other pursuits ==
McCary produced and co-wrote four songs on Voices of Theory's self-titled album. He has also produced and written for Keith Martin, Janita, and Johnny Gill.

McCary has acted in films such as Def Jam's How to Be a Player and Hoodlum. In Hoodlum, McCary's film debut, he portrayed an "explosives expert".

He was shown in the pilot for a talk show with Paula Poundstone called A Pound of Paula, which was not picked up.

== Personal life ==
McCary and his then wife lived in Marlton, New Jersey. The two had three children. After fourteen years of marriage, the two divorced. In 2016, McCary stated on Iyanla: Fix My Life that his children helped him through his depression.

R&B and jazz singer Will Downing is McCary's stepbrother.

McCary uses a cane. According to Wanya, in the beginning McCary used it "for style", and only later came to need it to help with his condition.

== Voice ==
"Mike was kind of always the odd guy in a sense. Obviously he was a freak of nature vocally. There's nobody that we've encountered outside of Melvin [Franklin] from The Temptations that actually spoke the way that he sang. Like, he was a true bass. You got guys that act like basses and sing like basses but aren't basses.”

— Shawn Stockman to Marc Lamont Hill, 2014

McCary provided bass for Boyz II Men's first six albums. Richard Harrington of the Washington Post described McCary's voice as "following the tradition" of Barry White and Isaac Hayes, while Geoffrey Himes of the same publication in his 1995 review of one of their shows referred to McCary as "the best R&B bass singer since the Temptations' Melvin Franklin." Mya Abraham of Audacy also compared Mike's bass to Franklin's, saying that it rivals his. Rock critic Rob Harvilla in his book 60 Songs That Explain the '90s described McCary's voice as "sonar-depth", an "invaluable listener-orienting device", and "trascendently earthbound", and called McCary's bridge on "End of the Road" his masterpiece. In Tom Breihan's review of "I'll Make Love to You" for Stereogum, he stated that despite not having a solo in the track, he appreciated McCary's "murmurs" that "are essentially part of the rhythm section" and enrich the track.

== Discography ==
=== Production/songwriting discography ===
- 1993: Johnny Gill – Provocative – "I Got You" (co-producer)
- 1995: Keith Martin – It's Long Overdue – "One Mile from Paradise" (producer, co-writer, vocals)
- 1997: Voices of Theory – Voices of Theory – "Wherever You Go"; "If I Knew" (producer, writer), "It's Been Awhile"; "I'll Give My Love to You" (producer)
- 1998: Janita – JANITA – "Baby, I Can't Stop" (producer, writer)

McCary is also credited as a composer, lyricist, and producer in several Boyz II Men albums.

=== Boyz II Men discography ===
Albums
Title	Album details
Cooleyhighharmony	Released: April 30, 1991; Label: Motown; Format: LP, CD, cassette
Christmas Interpretations	Released: October 5, 1993; Label: Motown; Format: LP, CD, cassette
II	Released: August 30, 1994; Label: Motown; Format: LP, CD, cassette
Evolution	Released: September 23, 1997; Label: Motown; Format: LP, CD, cassette
Nathan Michael Shawn Wanya	Released: September 12, 2000; Label: Universal; Format: CD, cassette
Full Circle	Released: June 11, 2002; Label: Arista; Format: CD, cassette
Singles
Year	Single
1991	"Motownphilly"
1991	"It's So Hard to Say Goodbye to Yesterday"
1991	"Uhh Ahh"
1992	"Please Don't Go"
1992	"End of the Road"
1993	"In the Still of the Nite (I'll Remember)"
1993	"Let It Snow" (featuring Brian McKnight)
1994	"I'll Make Love to You"
1994	"On Bended Knee"
1995	"Thank You"
1995	"Water Runs Dry"
1995	"Vibin'"
1995	"I Remember"
1997	"4 Seasons of Loneliness"
1997	"A Song for Mama"
1998	"Can't Let Her Go"
1998	"Doin' Just Fine"
1998	"I Will Get There"
2000	"Pass You By"
2000	"Thank You in Advance"
2002	"The Color of Love"
2002	"Relax Your Mind" (featuring Faith Evans)

== Filmography ==
=== Film ===
Year	Title	Role	Notes
1997	Hoodlum	Osgood	
1997	Def Jam's How to Be a Player	Self	
2007	Beyond the Pretty Door	Mr. Henry Callman	
2007	The Mannsfield 12	Herold	

== See also ==
- List of basses in non-classical music
- Disability
- Disability in the United States
- Disability Pride Month
