= So Amazing =

So Amazing may refer to:

Songs

- "So Amazing" (song), by Luther Vandross, originally performed by Dionne Warwick, for the 1983 album How Many Times Can We Say Goodbye and covered by many other artists
- "So Amazing", by Boyz II Men from the 2000 compilation album The Ballad Collection
- "So Amazing", by 50 Cent from the 2005 album The Massacre
- "So Amazing", by Jagged Edge from the 2006 album Jagged Edge
- "So Amazing", by Livin Out Loud from the 2006 album What About Us, a tribute to the victims of Hurricane Katrina

Albums

- So Amazing: An All-Star Tribute to Luther Vandross, 2005 tribute album to singer Luther Vandross
- So Amazin', 2006 album by Christina Milian
- So Amazing (Planetshakers album), 2001 live album by Australian Christian rock band Planetshakers

== See also ==
- It's So Amazing, a 1999 children's book about pregnancy and childbirth
- Amazing (Kanye West Song), 2008 single
