= 20th Century Masters – The Millennium Collection: The Best of Boyz II Men =

Greatest hits album by Boyz II Men
- Released: October 7, 2003
- Recorded: 1990–97
- Genre: R&B
- Label: Motown
- Producer: Michael Bivins, Dallas Austin, Babyface, Jimmy Jam & Terry Lewis

Boyz II Men chronology
Full Circle (2002)	20th Century Masters – The Millennium Collection: The Best of Boyz II Men (2003)	Throwback, Vol. 1 (2004)

20th Century Masters – The Millennium Collection: The Best of Boyz II Men is a 2003 mid-price greatest hits LP for R&B group Boyz II Men, released by Motown Records.

== Track listing ==
1. "End of the Road"
2. "It's So Hard to Say Goodbye to Yesterday"
3. "Motownphilly"
4. "In the Still of the Night (I'll Remember)"
5. "Uhh Ahh"
6. "I'll Make Love to You"
7. "Thank You"
8. "Water Runs Dry"
9. "4 Seasons of Loneliness"
10. "A Song for Mama"

== Charts ==
Chart (2011)	Peak position
US Billboard 200	70
US Top Catalog Albums (Billboard)	7
