= Throwback, Vol. 1 =

Studio album by Boyz II Men
- Released: August 24, 2004 (Japan)
- Recorded: 2004
- Genres: R&B, funk, soul
- Length: 50:54
- Labels: MSM / Koch, Pony Canyon
- Producer: Boyz II Men

Boyz II Men chronology
The Best of Boyz II Men (2003)	Throwback, Vol. 1 (2004)	Winter/Reflections (2005)

Throwback, Vol. 1 is the seventh studio album by American R&B group Boyz II Men, released by Koch Records, and featuring covers of classic R&B songs (hence the album title) from such artists as Teddy Pendergrass, The Isley Brothers and Michael Jackson. The album was their first as a trio, after founding member Michael McCary left the group due to chronic back problems. A rendition of Grandfather's Clock was included on the Taiwanese release as a bonus track.

== Critical reception ==
Professional ratings
Review scores
Source	Rating
Allmusic	3.5/5 stars
New York Post	3.5/4 stars
Rolling Stone	2/5 stars
Vibe	2/5 stars

Vibe Marcus Reeves found that "instead of fresh reinterpretations, the quartet gives listeners soulless Xeroxes. Vocals for ballads like Michael Jackson’s "Human Nature" and the Isley Brothers’ "For the Love of You" are notches below the originals. Although BIIM momentarily recaptures its shine with an a cappella rendition of DeBarge’s "Time Will Reveal," Throwback isn’t enough to throw them back atop the charts."

== Track listing ==
No.	Title	Writer(s)	Producer(s)	Length
1.	"Let It Whip" (Dazz Band)	Reggie Andrews; Leon Chancler	Wanya Morris; Patrick Crawford	4:37
2.	"Let's Stay Together" (Al Green)	Al Green; Al Jackson Jr.; Willie Mitchell	Nathan Morris; Shawn Stockman; W. Morris; P-Nutt	3:55
3.	"What You Won't Do for Love" (featuring MC Lyte) (Bobby Caldwell)	Robert Caldwell; Alfons Kettner	N. Morris; Stockman; W. Morris; P-Nutt	4:08
4.	"Cutie Pie" (One Way)	Theodore Dudley; Gregg Green; Al Hudson; Glenda Hudson; Jonathan Morgan; Terry Morgan; Dave Robertson, Jr.	N. Morris; Stockman; W. Morris; Demien "D-Nutt" Desandies	5:07
5.	"Close the Door" (Teddy Pendergrass)	Kenneth Gamble; Leon Huff	N. Morris; Stockman; W. Morris; P-Nutt	4:12
6.	"For the Love of You" (The Isley Brothers)	Ernie Isley; Marvin Isley; O'Kelly Isley Jr.; Ronald Isley; Rudolph Isley; Chris Jasper	N. Morris; Stockman; W. Morris; P-Nutt	5:41
7.	"Sara Smile" (Hall & Oates)	Daryl Hall; John Oates	N. Morris; Stockman; W. Morris; P-Nutt	3:40
8.	"Human Nature" (featuring Claudette Ortiz) (Michael Jackson)	John Bettis; Steve Porcaro	Stockman	4:10
9.	"Time Will Reveal" (DeBarge)	Eldra DeBarge; Etterlene Jordan	N. Morris; Stockman; W. Morris	4:20
10.	"I Miss You" (Klymaxx)	Lynn Malsby	Stockman	5:35
11.	"You Make Me Feel Brand New" (The Stylistics)	Thom Bell; Linda Creed	N. Morris	5:25
12.	"Grandfather's Clock" (Taiwanese bonus track)

It has been confirmed by one of the group members that a second CD will not be a part of The Throwback project. A Classic's CD was planned to be released later, potentially sometime in late 2007; this was later confirmed to be the Motown: A Journey Through Hitsville USA album, released in 2007.

== Charts ==
Chart (2004)	Peak position
Japanese Albums (Oricon)	30
US Billboard 200	52
US Top R&B/Hip-Hop Albums (Billboard)	8
