= The Ballad Collection =

Compilation album by Boyz II Men
- Released: May 9, 2000
- Recorded: 1990–1997
- Genre: R&B
- Length: N/A
- Label: Universal
- Producers: Babyface, Jimmy Jam and Terry Lewis

Boyz II Men chronology
Evolution (1997)	The Ballad Collection (2000)	Nathan Michael Shawn Wanya (2000)

Professional ratings
Review scores
Source	Rating
Allmusic	4/5 stars

The Ballad Collection is a 2000 compilation of ballads recorded by R&B group Boyz II Men, released by Universal Records. It includes both hit singles and album tracks.

== Track listing ==
1. "On Bended Knee"
2. "Doin' Just Fine"
3. "Please Don't Go"
4. "End of the Road"
5. "It's So Hard to Say Goodbye to Yesterday"
6. "Can You Stand the Rain"
7. "Girl in the Life Magazine"
8. "One Sweet Day" (with Mariah Carey)
9. "Four Seasons of Loneliness"
10. "Water Runs Dry"
11. "A Song for Mama"
12. "I'll Make Love to You"
13. "Your Home Is in My Heart" (featuring Chante Moore)
14. "I Will Get There"
15. "Yesterday" [Spanish Version]
16. "End of the Road" [instrumental]
17. "So Amazing"

== Charts ==
=== Weekly charts ===
Chart (2000)	Peak position
Japanese Albums (Oricon)	8

== Certifications ==
Region	Certification	Certified units/sales
Japan (RIAJ)	Platinum	200,000^{^}
^{^} Shipments figures based on certification alone.
