= List of Billboard Adult Contemporary number ones of 1996 =

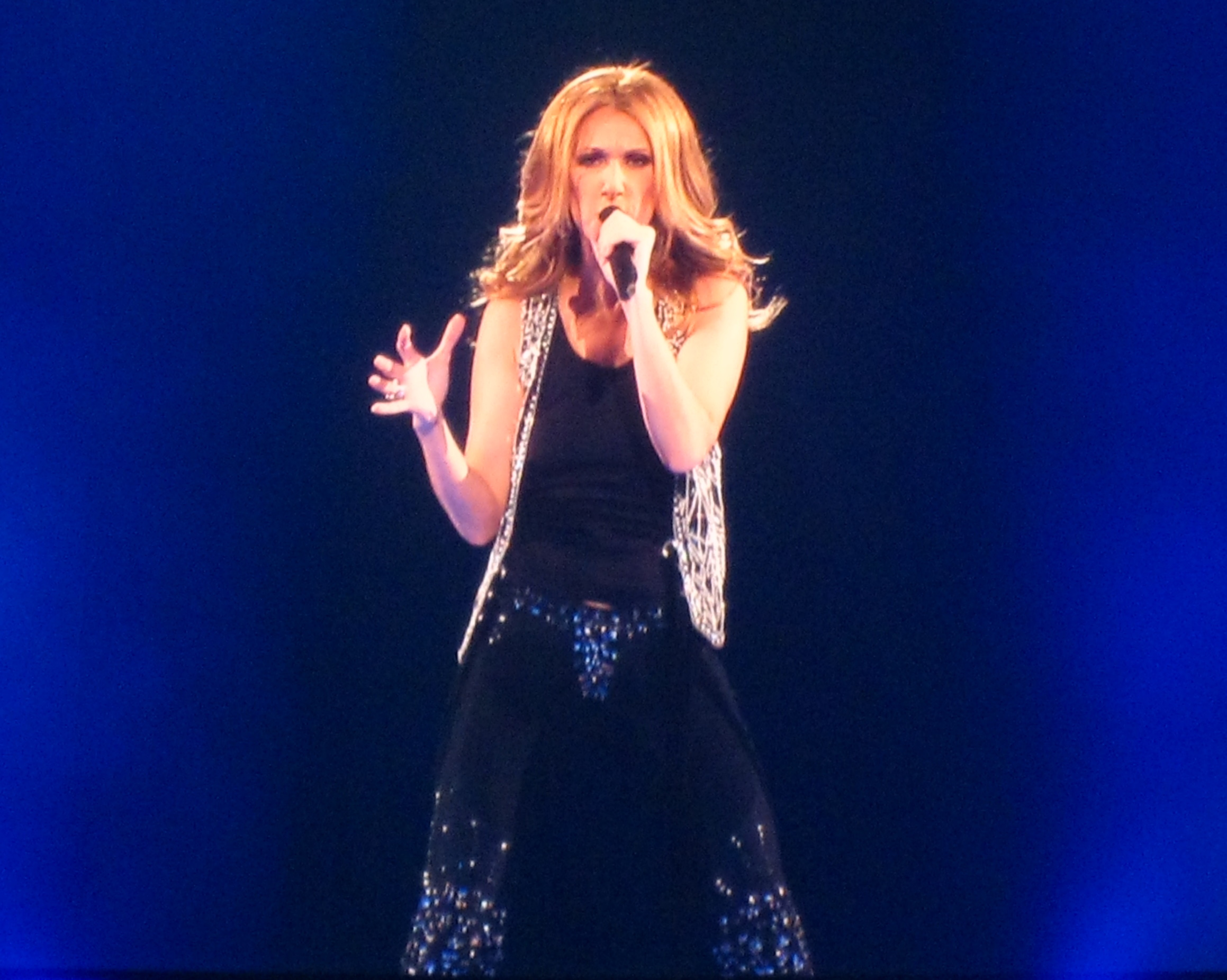
Celine Dion's song "Because You Loved Me" held the number one position for a record-breaking 19 weeks.

In 1996, Billboard magazine published a chart ranking the top-performing songs in the United States in the adult contemporary music (AC) market. The chart was published under the title Hot Adult Contemporary through the issue of Billboard dated March 9 and Adult Contemporary thereafter. In 1996, five songs topped the chart in 52 issues of the magazine, based on weekly airplay data from radio stations compiled by Nielsen Broadcast Data Systems.

For the first ten months of the year, only three songs occupied the top spot, each of which had an unbroken run of at least 12 weeks at number one. In the year's first issue of Billboard, the number one position was held by "One Sweet Day", a collaboration between Mariah Carey and Boyz II Men, which retained its position from the last chart of 1995. The R&B ballad held the top spot for the first 12 weeks of 1996 for a final total of 13 weeks at number one, a new record for the chart. "One Sweet Day" also topped Billboard's pop singles chart, the Hot 100, for a record-breaking 16 weeks. In a 2011 poll, the readers of the music magazine Rolling Stone voted it the best collaboration of all time. The song's record for the longest stay atop the AC chart was broken, however, by the next track to reach number one. In the issue of Billboard dated March 30, "One Sweet Day" was displaced from the top spot by "Because You Loved Me" by Canadian singer Celine Dion, which remained at number one for 19 consecutive weeks, another new record. Dion returned to number one for 5 weeks beginning in November with "It's All Coming Back to Me Now", meaning that she topped the chart in almost half the issues of Billboard published in 1996.

The third song to have a lengthy run at number one in 1996 was "Change the World" by the British singer-guitarist Eric Clapton, from the soundtrack of the film Phenomenon, which replaced "Because You Loved Me" in the top spot in the issue of Billboard dated August 10 and stayed at number one for 13 weeks. In addition to being a radio hit, the song also won the Grammy Awards for Song of the Year, Record of the Year and Best Male Pop Vocal Performance at the 1997 awards ceremony. The final number one of 1996 was "When You Love a Woman" by the band Journey, which occupied the top spot for the final three weeks of the year. The song was taken from the album Trial by Fire, the first release by the band after a hiatus of nearly a decade but the last to feature long-time lead vocalist Steve Perry, who left the band following a dispute over his refusal to have surgery for a degenerative hip condition.

== Chart history ==
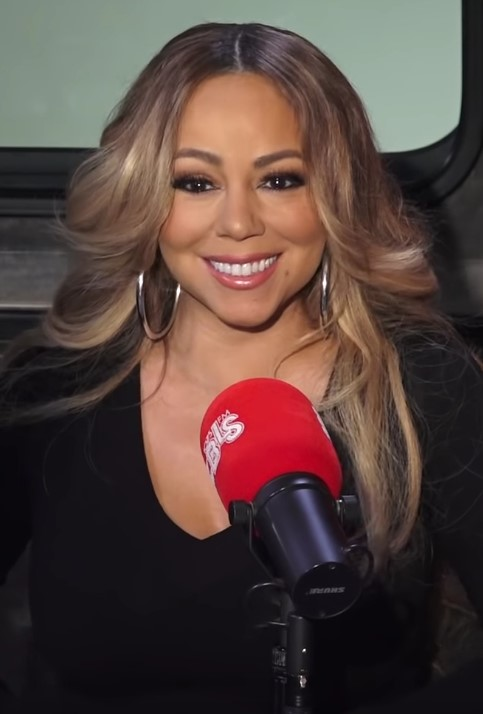
Mariah Carey's collaboration with Boyz II Men, "One Sweet Day", was number one for the first 12 weeks of the year.

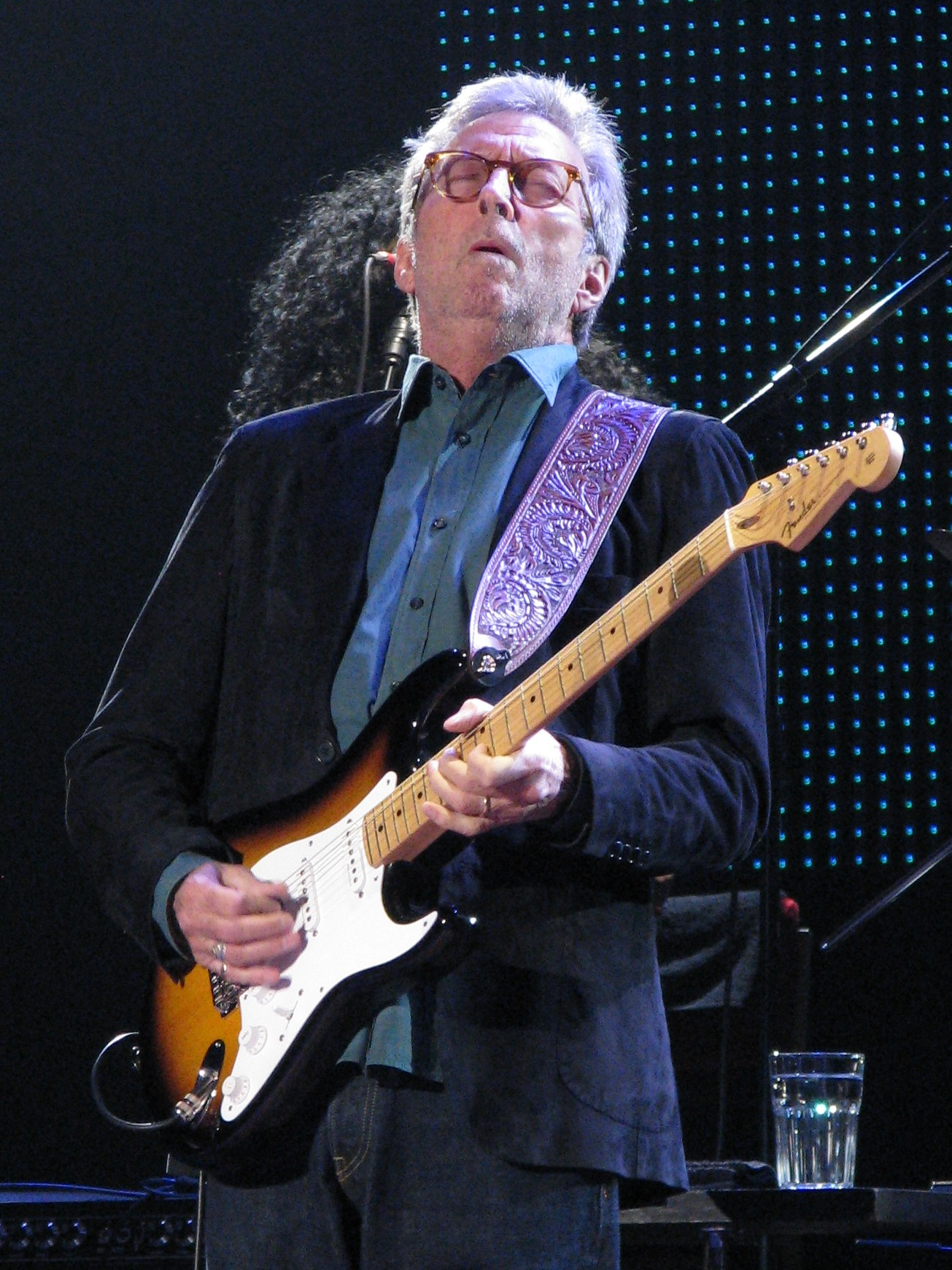
Eric Clapton was the third artist to have a lengthy run at number one in 1996, with the song "Change the World".

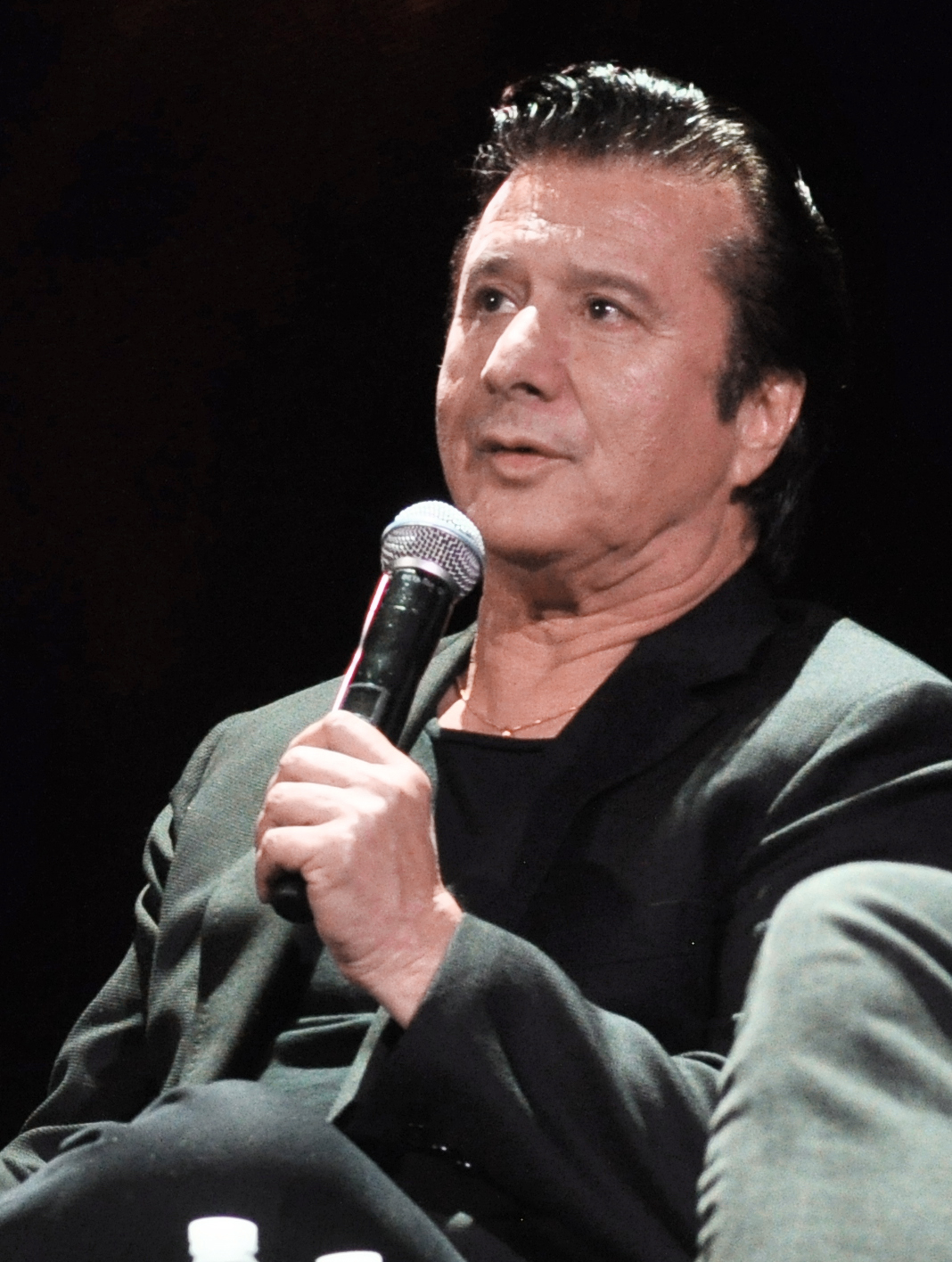
The rock band Journey ended the year at number one with "When You Love a Woman". It was one of the band's last chart entries to feature Steve Perry on lead vocals.

Chart history
Issue date	Title	Artist(s)	Ref.
January 6	"One Sweet Day"	Mariah Carey & Boyz II Men	
January 13	"One Sweet Day"	Mariah Carey & Boyz II Men	
January 20	"One Sweet Day"	Mariah Carey & Boyz II Men	
January 27	"One Sweet Day"	Mariah Carey & Boyz II Men	
February 3	"One Sweet Day"	Mariah Carey & Boyz II Men	
February 10	"One Sweet Day"	Mariah Carey & Boyz II Men	
February 17	"One Sweet Day"	Mariah Carey & Boyz II Men	
February 24	"One Sweet Day"	Mariah Carey & Boyz II Men	
March 2	"One Sweet Day"	Mariah Carey & Boyz II Men	
March 9	"One Sweet Day"	Mariah Carey & Boyz II Men	
March 16	"One Sweet Day"	Mariah Carey & Boyz II Men	
March 23	"One Sweet Day"	Mariah Carey & Boyz II Men	
March 30	"Because You Loved Me"	Celine Dion	
April 6	"Because You Loved Me"	Celine Dion	
April 13	"Because You Loved Me"	Celine Dion	
April 20	"Because You Loved Me"	Celine Dion	
April 27	"Because You Loved Me"	Celine Dion	
May 4	"Because You Loved Me"	Celine Dion	
May 11	"Because You Loved Me"	Celine Dion	
May 18	"Because You Loved Me"	Celine Dion	
May 25	"Because You Loved Me"	Celine Dion	
June 1	"Because You Loved Me"	Celine Dion	
June 8	"Because You Loved Me"	Celine Dion	
June 15	"Because You Loved Me"	Celine Dion	
June 22	"Because You Loved Me"	Celine Dion	
June 29	"Because You Loved Me"	Celine Dion	
July 6	"Because You Loved Me"	Celine Dion	
July 13	"Because You Loved Me"	Celine Dion	
July 20	"Because You Loved Me"	Celine Dion	
July 27	"Because You Loved Me"	Celine Dion	
August 3	"Because You Loved Me"	Celine Dion	
August 10	"Change the World"	Eric Clapton	
August 17	"Change the World"	Eric Clapton	
August 24	"Change the World"	Eric Clapton	
August 31	"Change the World"	Eric Clapton	
September 7	"Change the World"	Eric Clapton	
September 14	"Change the World"	Eric Clapton	
September 21	"Change the World"	Eric Clapton	
September 28	"Change the World"	Eric Clapton	
October 5	"Change the World"	Eric Clapton	
October 12	"Change the World"	Eric Clapton	
October 19	"Change the World"	Eric Clapton	
October 26	"Change the World"	Eric Clapton	
November 2	"Change the World"	Eric Clapton	
November 9	"It's All Coming Back to Me Now"	Celine Dion	
November 16	"It's All Coming Back to Me Now"	Celine Dion	
November 23	"It's All Coming Back to Me Now"	Celine Dion	
November 30	"It's All Coming Back to Me Now"	Celine Dion	
December 7	"It's All Coming Back to Me Now"	Celine Dion	
December 14	"When You Love a Woman"	Journey	
December 21	"When You Love a Woman"	Journey	
December 28	"When You Love a Woman"	Journey	

== See also ==
- 1996 in music
- List of artists who reached number one on the U.S. Adult Contemporary chart
