= Full Circle (Boyz II Men album) =

Studio album by Boyz II Men
- Released: July 23, 2002
- Length: 61:11
- Label: Arista
- Producers: Babyface; Boyz II Men; Edmund "Butter" Clement; Ken "F-Fam" Fambro; The Goonies; Andreao Heard; Jimmy Jam and Terry Lewis; Carlos McKinney; PAJAM; Marvin "Chanz" Parkman; Scott Storch

Boyz II Men chronology
| Legacy: The Greatest Hits Collection (2001) | Full Circle (2002) | The Best of Boyz II Men (2003) |

Singles from Full Circle
- 1. "The Color of Love" Released: June 11, 2002; 2. "Relax Your Mind" Released: July 16, 2002

Full Circle is the sixth album by American R&B group Boyz II Men. It was released by Arista Records on July 23, 2002 in the United States. Their only project with Arista, following their departure from Motown Records and the release of previous album Nathan Michael Shawn Wanya (2000) through Universal Records, it features the singles "The Color of Love", written by Babyface and "Relax Your Mind" featuring Faith Evans, Full Circle was the last Boyz II Men album to include bass singer Michael McCary.

The album received mixed reviews, with critics praising Boyz II Men's signature harmonies and ballads while criticizing the album's dated production, inconsistent uptempo tracks, and lack of innovation. Commercially, it achieved moderate success, peaking at number 10 on the US Billboard 200, number five on the Top R&B/Hip-Hop Albums chart, and charting within the top 30 in several international markets, ultimately selling 350,000 copies domestically by 2011. Full Circle earned Boyz II Men a Soul Train Music Award for R&B/Soul Album Group, Band or Duo.

== Critical reception ==
Professional ratings
Aggregate scores
| Source | Rating |
|---|---|
| Metacritic | 54/100 |
Review scores
| Source | Rating |
| AllMusic | 3/5 stars |
| Blender | 3/5 stars |
| Dotmusic | 7/10 |
| E! | C− |
| Entertainment Weekly | C |
| The Guardian | 2/5 stars |
| New York Post | 3/4 stars |
| Q | 3/5 stars |
| Rolling Stone | 2/5 stars |
| Slant Magazine | 2.5/5 stars |

Full Circle received mixed reviews from critics. At Metacritic, which assigns a normalized rating out of 100 to reviews from mainstream critics, the album has an average score of 54 based on eight reviews. Britt Robson from The Washington Post observed that Boyz II Men signal a return to form on Full Circle, embracing a "tried and true" approach. She suggested the album reflects maturity, arguing the group focuses on deepening rather than broadening their established style. Writing for Dotmusic, Diana Evans described the album as "decent" with "flawless vocals, opulent harmonies, and easy, reliable melodies," though "not extraordinary." She praised the ballads as effective while criticizing some uptempo tracks as "trying too hard," concluding it is "good, value-for-money stuff" but unlikely to elevate their legacy further. BBC critic Buki Bakare described Full Circle as a "return to form" to restore their "signature style." He concluded that the album overall "reaffirms the group's position as leading practitioners of romantic R&B," delivering “quality material for both longtime fans and general audiences."

Stephen Thomas Erlewine of AllMusic noted that the album mixes "early-'80s funk-influenced hip-hop" with "adult contemporary balladry," but said it "doesn't mesh particularly well." He added the material is "well-sung" yet "not particularly distinguished," concluding it is "pleasant enough" but "not that memorable," and "quite a disappointment." Similarly, Slant Magazine's Sal Cinquemani wrote that Full Circle "doesn't exactly transport" them back to earlier successes, though it reunites them with Babyface and Jimmy Jam and Terry Lewis. He noted its "typical R&B" lyrics and said attempts to modernize are "hit or miss," with efforts to fit in causing their style to "blend away." More critical assessments came from Dave Simpson of The Guardian, who said the album "barely deviates" from their formula and is "immaculate" yet "soullessly produced," and Entertainment Weekly's Jon Caramanica who found the material "garishly produced and lyrically insipid," arguing it portrays the group "in decline." Writing for Rolling Stone, Ernest Hardy similarly criticized the album as "top-heavy on slow-groove laments" with "sophomoric" lyrics and a "slightly dated" production, noting the group's "creative rut" and concluding the album "only digs them in deeper."

== Accolades ==
In February 2003, Boyz II Men were nominated for a Soul Train Music Award for R&B/Soul Album Group, Band or Duo for Full Circle.

== Commercial performance ==
Full Circle achieved moderate commercial success worldwide. In the United States, the album opened and peaked at number 10 on the Billboard 200 with first week sales of 83,000 units. It marked Boyz II Men's fifth top ten entry on the chart. The album also reached number 5 on Billboard's Top R&B/Hip-Hop Albums chart. By October 2011, Full Circle had sold 350,000 copies domestically.

Internationally, it entered the top 30 in several countries, including Canada (number 29), Germany (number 29), and Japan (number 11), while also charting in France, the United Kingdom, Switzerland, and Australia. On genre-specific charts, the album performed well on the Canadian R&B Albums chart (number 6) and the UK R&B Albums chart (number 13).

== Track listing ==
North America/Europe version
| No. | Title | Writer(s) | Producer(s) | Length |
|---|---|---|---|---|
| 1. | "Relax Your Mind" (featuring Faith Evans) | Raphael Brown; Farrah Fleurimond; Eldra DeBarge; William DeBarge; Carlos McKinney; Jarrett Washington; Etterlene Jordan | McKinney | 4:05 |
| 2. | "The Color of Love" | Kenneth Edmonds | Babyface | 4:52 |
| 3. | "Ain't a Thang Wrong" (featuring Rob Jackson) | Shawn Stockman; Trizzy; Ken "F-Fam" Fambro; Rob Jackson | Fambro | 4:08 |
| 4. | "Oh Well" | James Harris III; Terry Lewis; Michael McCary; Nathan Morris; Wanya Morris; Stockman | Jimmy Jam & Terry Lewis | 4:55 |
| 5. | "Whatcha Need" | Brown; Fambro; Donnie "D-Major" Boynton | Fambro | 5:04 |
| 6. | "On the Road Again" | Kenny Hickson; N. Morris; W. Morris; Stockman; Fambro | N. Morris | 4:14 |
| 7. | "Makin' Love (Interlude)" | Hickson; N. Morris; W. Morris; Stockman | N. Morris | 1:57 |
| 8. | "Roll Wit Me" | McCary; N. Morris; W. Morris; Stockman; Scott Storch | Scott Storch | 3:32 |
| 9. | "Right on Time" | Andreao Heard; Charod Barnes; Jerry Barnes; W. Morris | Heard; W. Morris | 5:00 |
| 10. | "Howz About It" | Edmund "Butter" Clement; Anita McCloud | Clement | 4:02 |
| 11. | "That's Why I Love You" | Harris; Lewis; McCary; N. Morris; W. Morris; Stockman | Jam & Lewis | 5:15 |
| 12. | "I'm OK, You're OK" | Fambro; W. Morris; Hickson | Fambro; W. Morris | 4:51 |
| 13. | "Luv N U" | Beau Dozier; Jason Edmonds; W. Morris; Dylan F. Gorman | The Goonies; W. Morris | 5:08 |
| 14. | "I'll Show You" | Paul Allen; James Moss | PAJAM | 4:11 |
| Total length: | | | | 61:11 |

Japan version
| No. | Title | Writer(s) | Producer(s) | Length |
|---|---|---|---|---|
| 1. | "Relax Your Mind" (featuring Faith Evans) | Brown; Fleurimond; E. DeBarge; W. DeBarge; McKinney; Washington; Jordan | Carlos McKinney | 4:05 |
| 2. | "The Color of Love" | K. Edmonds | Babyface | 4:52 |
| 3. | "Ain't a Thang Wrong" (featuring Rob Jackson) | Stockman; Trizzy; Fambro; Jackson | Fambro | 4:08 |
| 4. | "Oh Well" | Harris; Lewis; McCary; N. Morris; W. Morris; Stockman | Jam & Lewis | 4:55 |
| 5. | "Whatcha Need" | Brown; Fambro; Boynton | Fambro | 5:04 |
| 6. | "On the Road Again" | Hickson; N. Morris; W. Morris; Stockman; Fambro | N. Morris | 4:27 |
| 7. | "Roll Wit Me" | McCary; N. Morris; W. Morris; Stockman; Storch | Storch | 3:51 |
| 8. | "Right on Time" | Heard; J. Barnes; C. Barnes; W. Morris | Heard; W. Morris | 5:00 |
| 9. | "Howz About It" | Clement; McCloud | Clement | 4:02 |
| 10. | "That's Why I Love You" | Harris; Lewis; McCary; N. Morris; W. Morris; Stockman | Jam & Lewis | 5:15 |
| 11. | "I'm OK, You're OK" | Fambro; Hickson; W. Morris | Fambro; W. Morris | 4:51 |
| 12. | "Luv N U" | Dozier; J. Edmonds; W. Morris; Gorman | The Goonies; W. Morris | 5:08 |
| 13. | "I'll Show You" | Allen; Moss | PAJAM | 4:11 |

Bonus track(s)
| No. | Title | Writer(s) | Producer(s) | Length |
|---|---|---|---|---|
| 14. | "Woman Don't Cry" | Edmonds; Bill Withers | Babyface | 3:48 |
| 15. | "You're My Baby" | Brown; Marvin "Chanz" Parkman | Parkman; Boyz II Men | 4:55 |

Sample credits

- "Woman Don't Cry" contains replayed elements from "Lean On Me" (1972) as written and performed by Bill Withers.

== Charts ==
=== Weekly charts ===
Weekly chart performance for Full Circle
| Chart (2002) | Peak position |
|---|---|
| Australian Albums (ARIA) | 73 |
| Canadian Albums (Nielsen SoundScan) | 29 |
| Canadian R&B Albums (Nielsen SoundScan) | 6 |
| European Albums (Billboard) | 49 |
| French Albums (SNEP) | 40 |
| German Albums (Offizielle Top 100) | 29 |
| Japanese Albums (Oricon) | 11 |
| Swiss Albums (Schweizer Hitparade) | 69 |
| UK Albums (Official Charts) | 56 |
| UK R&B Albums (Official Charts) | 13 |
| US Billboard 200 | 10 |
| US Top R&B/Hip-Hop Albums (Billboard) | 5 |

=== Year-end charts ===
Year-end chart performance for Full Circle
| Chart (2002) | Position |
|---|---|
| Canadian R&B Albums (Nielsen SoundScan) | 127 |
| US Top R&B/Hip-Hop Albums (Billboard) | 74 |

== Certifications ==
Certifications for Full Circle
| Region | Certification | Certified units/sales |
|---|---|---|
| Japan (RIAJ) | Platinum | 200,000^{^} |
^{^} Shipments figures based on certification alone.

== Release history ==
Full Circle release history
| Region | Date | Label | Format |
|---|---|---|---|
| United Kingdom | July 22, 2002 | Arista | Cassette; CD |
| United States | July 23, 2002 | Arista | CD |
| Japan | July 23, 2002 | Arista | CD |
