= The Prince of Egypt (soundtrack) =

1998 film soundtrack album

The Prince of Egypt (Music from the Original Motion Picture Soundtrack)

Soundtrack album by various artists
- Released: November 17, 1998
- Genres: Soundtrack; religious; R&B; gospel
- Length: 76:00
- Label: DreamWorks
- Producers: Jimmy Jam and Terry Lewis; Babyface; Michael Omartian; Hans Zimmer

Singles from The Prince of Egypt
- 1. "When You Believe" Released: November 2, 1998; 2. "I Will Get There" Released: December 29, 1998

The official soundtrack for The Prince of Egypt was released on November 17, 1998. It features songs and scoring from the film, as well as songs not used in the film. The album peaked at No. 1 on Billboard magazine's Top Contemporary Christian chart, and No. 25 on the Billboard 200 chart.

In addition to this album, tie-in albums were also released; a collector's edition, a country edition, and an inspirational edition. These other albums contained music that was not featured in the film but rather inspired by the Biblical story of Exodus.

The album also spawned a pair of hit singles. The first track, "When You Believe", was a duet performed by Mariah Carey and Whitney Houston, while the sixteenth track, "Through Heaven's Eyes", was performed by R&B duo K-Ci & JoJo, and the album's final track, "I Will Get There", was performed a cappella by R&B quartet Boyz II Men.

== Songs ==
"Deliver Us" is the film's opening number, serving to show the violence and hardships endured by the Israelite slaves, and the despair of Moses's mother. The song alternates dramatically between male slave voices over heavy drum beats, and women's voices singing a gentle lullaby to the baby Moses.

The lullaby portion of "Deliver Us" was performed by Israeli singer Ofra Haza (the first lines in Hebrew across all dubbed versions) and Disney actress Eden Riegel, with music composed by Hans Zimmer. Christopher Coleman explained that "'Deliver Us' features the powerful vocals I was hoping for... This track concludes with an abruptness which is very similar to the opening track of Zimmer's Oscar-winning score for The Lion King". Stephen Schwartz explained his use of the word "Elohim" in the song: "I wanted an authentic sounding Hebrew reference to God to help set the time and place. My first choice was "Adonai", but I was told by the religious consultants on the film that it would have been sacrilegious to use that term in that way in those days. So I selected "Elohim" instead, partly because it was slightly archaic, and partly because the scansion of the word fit the music!"

"All I Ever Wanted" is sung by Amick Byram as Moses, after Moses discovers he is adopted, which results in him questioning his Egyptian identity and his Jewish heritage. It is reprised shortly after by Linda Dee Shayne playing the role of Queen of Egypt, who reassures Moses of his place in their family. The song was written by Stephen Schwartz, who visited an Egyptian temple for inspiration: "There was something about walking through those beautiful white columns reflected in the moonlight and seeing the hieroglyphs that triggered the tune which became, 'All I Ever Wanted'". Filmtracks wrote that "the uplifting and buoyant 'All I Ever Wanted' is the closest Schwartz comes to emulating the hero's song of aspiration that Alan Menken made famous throughout the decade. The determination in this short song is convincing and the queen's reprise is elegantly merged with the river melody from 'Deliver Us' at its conclusion". However, Entertainment Weekly wrote: "Even on repeat listenings, Moses' requisite I-want song – called, lamely, 'All I Ever Wanted'– simply isn't memorable, no matter that the star-crossed royal helpfully whistles snatches of it in another scene". LA Weekly described it as "one of Stephen Schwartz's awful songs".

"Through Heaven's Eyes" is performed in the film by Brian Stokes Mitchell, while the pop single version is performed by R&B duo K-Ci & JoJo. Stokes Mitchell provides the singing voice for Danny Glover's Jethro character, Tzipporah's father and Moses's future father-in-law. Music and lyrics are by Stephen Schwartz, who said the song was his "favorite" of the film: "...one of the directors, Steven Hickner, came in with a poem called 'The Measure of a Man', and I based the lyric for the song on the philosophy in the poem..." Filmtracks said the song is a listener favorite but the voice of Stokes Mitchell overwhelmed the folk music background. Filmtracks wrote that "the K-Ci & Jo Jo version of 'Through Heaven's Eyes', will be intolerable for most film score collectors". Entertainment Weekly described the song as "the 'Hava Nagila'–style campfire rave".

Filmtracks notes: "'The Plagues'...challenges the lyrical nature of the film's early songs with deliberately harsh chanting..."

== Critical reception ==
Professional ratings
Review scores
| Source | Rating |
|---|---|
| Allmusic | link |
| Filmtracks | 4/5 stars |

At the 71st Academy Awards, the film won Best Original Song for "When You Believe" and a nomination for Best Original Musical or Comedy Score.

== Track listing ==
All tracks are written by Stephen Schwartz, except where noted. All scores composed by Hans Zimmer.

| No. | Title | Performer(s) | Length |
|---|---|---|---|
| 1. | "When You Believe" (additional writing and producing by Babyface) | Mariah Carey and Whitney Houston | 5:04 |
| 2. | "Deliver Us" (produced/arranged by Zimmer) | Ofra Haza and Eden Riegel | 7:15 |
| 3. | "The Reprimand" | | 4:05 |
| 4. | "Following Tzipporah" | | 1:00 |
| 5. | "All I Ever Wanted (with Queen's Reprise)" (produced/arranged by Zimmer and Harry Gregson-Williams) | Amick Byram and Linda Dee Shayne | 2:51 |
| 6. | "Goodbye Brother" | Ofra Haza | 5:33 |
| 7. | "Through Heaven's Eyes" (produced/arranged by Gavin Greenaway) | Brian Stokes Mitchell | 3:41 |
| 8. | "The Burning Bush" | | 7:17 |
| 9. | "Playing with the Big Boys" (produced/arranged by John Powell) | Steve Martin and Martin Short | 2:52 |
| 10. | "Cry" | | 3:50 |
| 11. | "Rally" | | 0:42 |
| 12. | "The Plagues" (produced/arranged by Gavin Greenaway) | Ralph Fiennes and Amick Byram | 2:40 |
| 13. | "Death of the First Born" | | 1:07 |
| 14. | "When You Believe" (produced/arranged by Hans Zimmer) | Michelle Pfeiffer and Sally Dworsky | 4:55 |
| 15. | "Red Sea" | | 5:14 |
| 16. | "Through Heaven's Eyes" | K-Ci & JoJo | 5:05 |
| 17. | "River Lullaby" | Amy Grant | 3:57 |
| 18. | "Humanity" (writers: Louis Brown III, Scott Parker) | Jessica Andrews, Clint Black, Shirley Caesar, Jesse Campbell, Beth Nielsen Chapman, Boyz II Men | 4:32 |
| 19. | "I Will Get There" (writer: Diane Warren) | Boyz II Men | 4:20 |
| Total length: | | | 76:00 |

Collector's Edition Bonus Tracks
| No. | Title | Performer(s) | Length |
|---|---|---|---|
| 1. | "It is Only Beginning..." | | 3:44 |
| 2. | "Freedom" | Wynonna | 4:41 |
| 3. | "The River" | CeCe Winans | 3:53 |
| 4. | "Humanity" | Jessica Andrews, Clint Black, Shirley Caesar, Jesse Campbell, Beth Nielsen Chapman, Boyz II Men | 4:33 |
| 5. | "Through Heaven's Eyes" | Brian Stokes Mitchell | 3:37 |
| 6. | "Chariot Race" | | 6:27 |
| Total length: | | | 26:55 |

== Charts ==
=== Weekly charts ===
| Chart (1998–1999) | Peak position |
|---|---|
| Austrian Albums (Ö3 Austria) | 48 |
| Canada Top Albums/CDs (RPM) | 87 |
| Dutch Albums (Album Top 100) | 77 |
| US Billboard 200 | 25 |
| US Top Christian Albums (Billboard) | 1 |

=== Monthly charts ===
| Chart (1999) | Peak position |
|---|---|
| South Korean Albums (RIAK) | 18 |

=== Year-end charts ===
| Chart (1999) | Position |
|---|---|
| US Billboard 200 | 113 |

== Certifications and sales ==
| Region | Certification | Certified units/sales |
|---|---|---|
| Canada (Music Canada) | Gold | 50,000^{^} |
| United States (RIAA) | Platinum | 1,000,000^{^} |
^{^} Shipments figures based on certification alone.
