= Relax Your Mind (song) =

Single by Boyz II Men featuring Faith Evans

from the album Full Circle
- Released: September 10, 2002
- Length: 4:05
- Label: Arista
- Songwriters: Raphael Brown; Etterle Jordan; Jarret Washington; Farrah Fleurimond; William DeBarge; Eldra DeBarge; Carlos McKinney
- Producer: Los Da Mystro

Boyz II Men singles chronology
"The Color of Love" (2002)	"Relax Your Mind" (2002)	"What You Won't Do for Love" (2004)

Faith Evans singles chronology
"Alone in This World" (2002)	"Relax Your Mind" (2002)	"Ma, I Don't Love Her" (2002)

"Relax Your Mind" featuring Faith Evans, is the second single by R&B vocal group Boyz II Men from the album Full Circle. This was the last single that included bass singer, Michael McCary.

== Track listing ==
=== CD single ===
1. "Relax Your Mind" (Radio mix) — 4:06
2. "Relax Your Mind" (Instrumental) — 4:05

=== Vinyl 12" single ===
1. "Relax Your Mind" (LP version) — 4:06
2. "Relax Your Mind" (Instrumental) — 4:05
3. "Relax Your Mind" (Album version) — 4:02
4. "Relax Your Mind" (Acapella) — 4:05

== Charts ==
Chart (2002)	Peak position
US Hot R&B/Hip-Hop Songs (Billboard)	52
