= One Sweet Day =

1995 single by Mariah Carey and Boyz II Men

Single by Mariah Carey and Boyz II Men

from the album Daydream
- B-side: "One Sweet Day" (Live)
- Released: November 13, 1995
- Studio: The Hit Factory (New York City); Wallyworld (San Rafael, California)
- Genre: R&B; pop
- Length: 4:41
- Label: Columbia
- Composers: Mariah Carey; Walter Afanasieff
- Lyricists: Mariah Carey; Michael McCary; Nathan Morris; Wanya Morris; Shawn Stockman
- Producers: Mariah Carey; Walter Afanasieff

Mariah Carey singles chronology
"Fantasy" (1995)	"One Sweet Day" (1995)	"Joy to the World" (1995)

Boyz II Men singles chronology
"Hey Lover" (1995)	"One Sweet Day" (1995)	"I Remember" (1995)

Music video
- "One Sweet Day" on YouTube

"One Sweet Day" is a song by American singer-songwriter Mariah Carey and vocal harmony group Boyz II Men. The artists co-wrote the song with Walter Afanasieff, who co-produced it with Carey. Inspired by people in their lives and the sufferers of the AIDS epidemic, "One Sweet Day" sees the singers grieve the loss of a loved one and hold onto the hope of reuniting in heaven. It is a sentimental ballad influenced by R&B and pop, featuring keyboards, synthesizers, a synth bass, and guitar. Columbia Records released it on November 13, 1995, as the second single from Carey's fifth studio album, Daydream (1995).

On release, "One Sweet Day" received widespread critical acclaim for its emotionally resonant lyrics about grief and loss, as well as for the vocal performances of Carey and Boyz II Men. Music critics identified the track as a standout from Daydream. It reached number one in Canada, New Zealand, South Africa, and the United States, and charted within the top ten in Australia, Belgium, Denmark, France, Ireland, the Netherlands, Norway, Panama, Sweden, and the United Kingdom. In the US, "One Sweet Day" became the fourth song to debut at number one on Billboard Hot 100 and spent 16 consecutive weeks atop the chart, breaking the record for the longest-running number-one song in history; it held this record for 23 years.

Larry Jordan directed the music video for "One Sweet Day", which features scenes of Carey and Boyz II Men in and around the studio, as well as during the recording session. Because both acts had busy schedules, there was no time to produce a full-scale video. The song was performed at the ceremony for the 38th Annual Grammy Awards (1996) and the memorial service for Princess Diana (1997). Carey has also performed the song in most of her concert tours and residencies, first during the Daydream World Tour in 1996. Retrospectively, critics have ranked "One Sweet Day" highly amongst her songs. It appears on her compilation albums #1's (1998), Greatest Hits (2001), The Ballads (2008), and #1 to Infinity (2015).

== Background and development ==
"Dreamlover" was released as the lead single from American singer-songwriter Mariah Carey's third studio album, Music Box (1993). A mid-tempo pop song, "Dreamlover" was identified by some critics as the singer's first attempt into the contemporary R&B market. By the release of her first holiday album, Merry Christmas (1994), Carey had already recorded seven songs for her fifth studio album, titled Daydream (1995). She sought greater creative control over her work and increasingly pursued the R&B and hip-hop influences she had long admired.

Carey had previously worked with close friend and music producer David Cole on two of her studio albums, Emotions (1991) and Music Box, as well as on her MTV Unplugged project (1992). After his death in 1995, Carey began writing a song about how losing someone close can change a person's life and perspective. Carey had developed an "initial idea" for the song with Walter Afanasieff and had already written the chorus. As an admirer of their work, she wanted to collaborate with the American vocal harmony group Boyz II Men, so she set the song aside, saying she did not want to finish it because it could be "our song if we ever do it together".

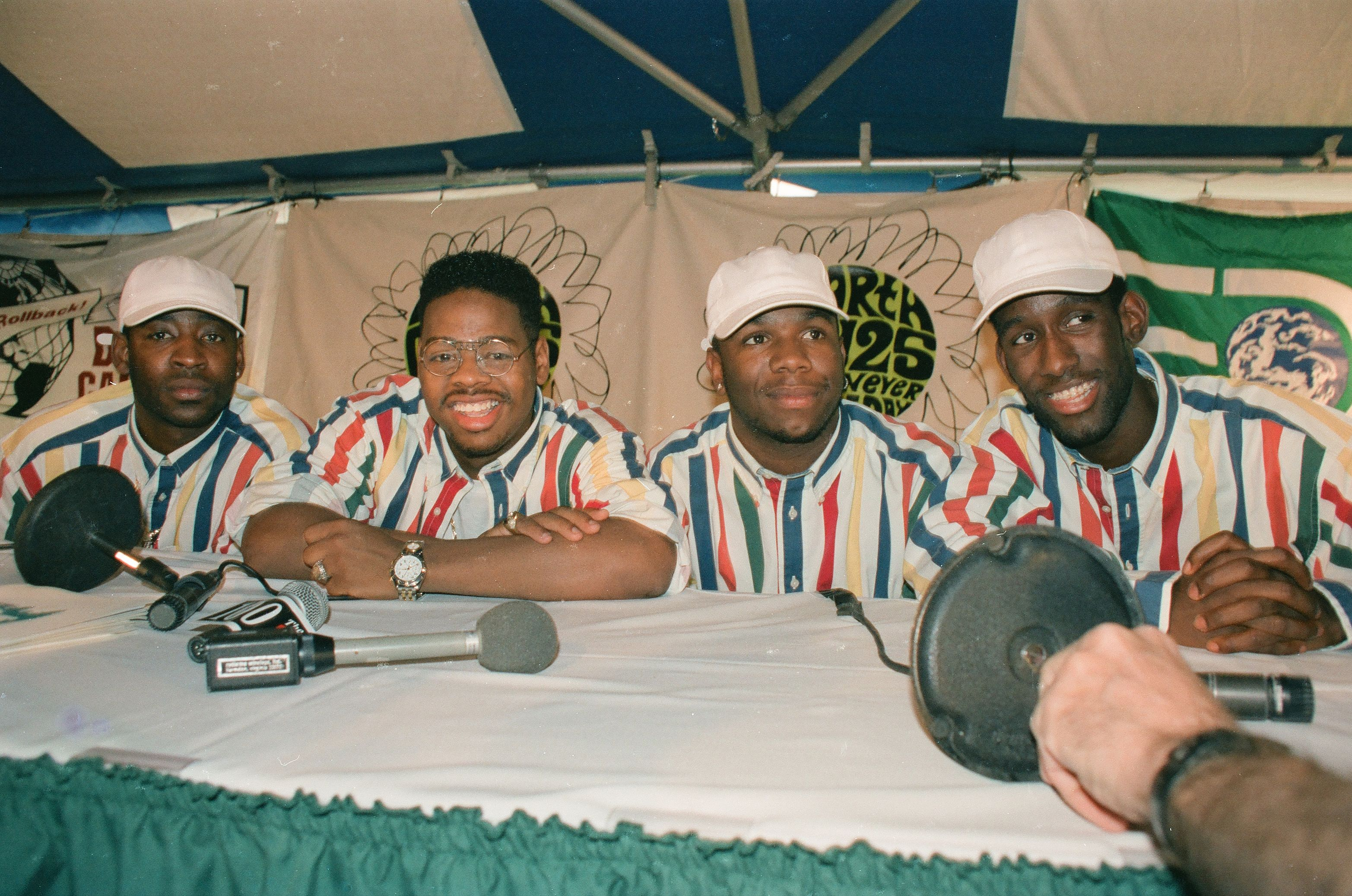
Boyz II Men in 1995, the same year they collaborated with Carey on "One Sweet Day"

After meeting with Boyz II Men, Carey learned that group member Nathan Morris had been developing a similar song for the group, dedicated to Khalil Rountree, their late tour manager. According to Carey, it featured "basically the same lyrics" and fit "over the same chord changes". Using Carey's chorus and concept alongside the melody created by the group, they wrote and composed the song together. The track was co-produced by both Carey and Afanasieff; the latter expanded on the melody and incorporated additional grooves and beats. As work on the song progressed, Carey expanded the chorus with additional lyrics intended to make it resonate with those affected by the AIDS epidemic, which peaked in the mid-1990s. Her sister, Alison Carey, had been diagnosed with HIV in 1988 at the age of 27, which strained their relationship.

== Composition ==
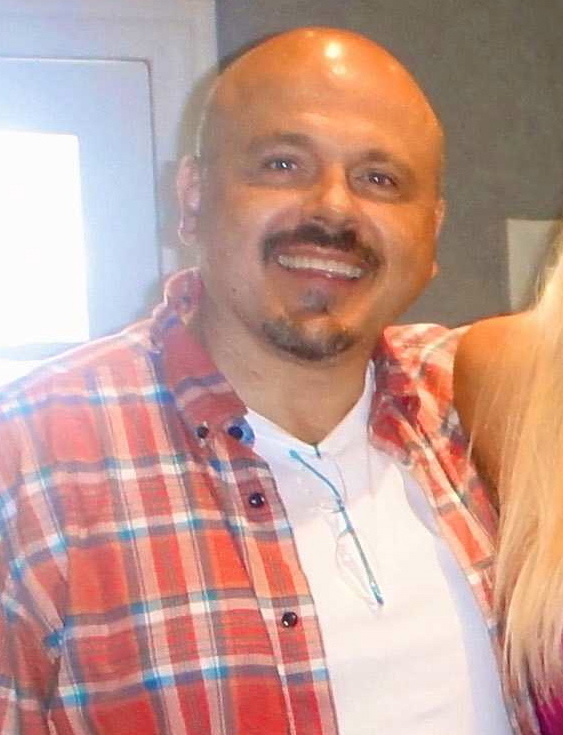
Carey produced "One Sweet Day" with Walter Afanasieff (pictured in 2011).

"One Sweet Day" is a sentimental R&B and pop ballad that runs for four minutes and forty-one seconds. (Note: References for "One Sweet Day" being a sentimental ballad; its genres; and its length.) Journalist Ana Monroy Yglesias, writing for the Grammy Awards website, deemed it a slow jam. Carey wrote the lyrics with Afanasieff and the four members of Boyz II Men—Michael McCary, Nathan Morris, Wanya Morris, and Shawn Stockman—while she and Afanasieff composed the music. Dan Shea performed the keyboards, synthesizers, drum and rhythm programming, while Dann Huff played guitar. Shea and Afanasieff both worked with the synth bass electronically. The track was engineered by David Gleeson, Jay Healy, and Dana Jon Chappelle in WallyWorld in San Rafael, California, and the Hit Factory in New York. It was then mixed by Mick Guzauski at Sony Music Studios in New York City, and mastered by Bob Ludwig at Gateway Mastering.

Critics have interpreted "One Sweet Day" as a dialogue between the narrator and a deceased loved one, with the former expressing regret over things left unsaid. The narrator sings in the hope of an eventual reunion, believing they will meet their departed loved ones again in heaven. Its themes revolve around yearning, sadness, and hope, as Tom Breihan of Stereogum wrote, who interpreted the song as conveying a universal experience of loss. Music commentator Stephen Holden, writing for The New York Times, described the chorus as more uplifting, opining that it anticipates a future reunion that extends beyond a single individual to include others who have been lost. Psychologist John H. Harvey interpreted the song as expressing hope that deceased loved ones have found peace in the afterlife.

'One Sweet Day'
In the chorus of the R&B and pop ballad, all five vocalists harmonize to express the hopeful belief that they will be reunited in heaven with their deceased loved ones.

"One Sweet Day" is structured in verse–chorus form. According to the sheet music published at Musicnotes.com by Sony/ATV Music Publishing, the song is in a slow tempo of seventy-six beats per minute and is composed in the key of A♭ major, with the singers' vocal range spanning from E♭4 to A♭5. "One Sweet Day" is delivered as a duet; the five vocalists harmonize together only during the chorus. Carey and Boyz II Men lead vocalist Wanya Morris employ extensive melismatic phrasing throughout the song. Musicologist David Metzer observed that, at times, the two singers appear to compete in elaborating on melodic lines established by the other group members and suggested that this may occasionally overshadow the song's themes of mourning.

== Critical reception ==
Music critics praised "One Sweet Day" on release. Unnamed writers for People praised Carey's "bravura" belting as one of the strengths on Daydream, while commentators from Music & Media commended Boyz II Men's contributions to the "skillful ballad" for adding a "soulful touch" to Carey's "perfectionist vocals". Jonathan Takiff, in the Philadelphia Daily News, deemed it one of the best songs from Daydream. Ervin Dyer of the Pittsburgh Post-Gazette opined that "One Sweet Day", along with the ballad "Melt Away", contributed a sense of "tender passion" to Daydream that he found lacking in Carey's earlier albums. Entertainment Weekly contributor Ken Tucker wrote that "One Sweet Day" radiates a "breezy sexiness" that Carey, "for all the brazen hussiness of her public persona, rarely permits herself to reveal in song". In more negative reviews, James Masterton of Dotmusic described the song as "a saccharine piece of American soul slush", while Cheo H. Coker, writing for the Los Angeles Times, deemed the track "largely forgettable". Gina Morris of Smash Hits characterized it as a "soulful, purer-than-pure twee little number".

Retrospective commentary of "One Sweet Day" has generally remained positive. Writers for Entertainment Weekly praised Carey"s "heavenly vocals", in addition to its universal message and Boyz II Men's "sweet" harmonies. Billboard named it one of the greatest singles of the 1990s decade, describing it as "an event vocal showcase for two of the preeminent vocal artists of the decade", while writing that its "jaw-dropping showiness never overshadows its genuine emotion". In Pitchfork, Jamieson Cox praised its "killer" hook and its "ecstatic second half" in which the vocalists build on the "sturdy" chorus with "gymnastic riffs and clusters of harmony". He added that no other track on Daydream matched its emotional impact. In a negative review, Breihan deemed it "overwrought" and "self-satisfied", stating that it "left [him] cold" both at the time of release and later. He suggested that "One Sweet Day" did not endure culturally in proportion to its record-breaking chart run.

=== Accolades and rankings ===
Music critics have regarded "One Sweet Day" as amongst Carey's strongest works. The Guardian ranked it fourth among her best singles, while Cleveland.com and Vulture placed it ninth and tenth, respectively. On lists of her best songs, "One Sweet Day" ranked sixth on Billboard's and seventh on Oprah Daily's. At the 38th Annual Grammy Awards, Daydream and its songs received six nominations. "One Sweet Day" earned two of these, for Best Pop Collaboration with Vocals and Record of the Year. To the surprise of both Carey and critics, the album did not win in any of its nominated categories. At the Billboard Music Awards in 1996, it received a Special Hot 100 Singles Award – Most Weeks at No. 1 on the Billboard Hot 100. "One Sweet Day" received a Blockbuster Entertainment Award for Favorite Adult Contemporary Single Female.

== Release and commercial performance ==
"One Sweet Day" is the third track on Daydream. The album was first released in Taiwan on September 26, 1995, by Columbia Records. It was then issued in the United States on October 3. Three days earlier, the album's lead single, "Fantasy", debuted atop the US Billboard Hot 100, becoming the first song by a woman to do so, and the second song overall. While "Fantasy" was still atop the chart, Columbia first issued "One Sweet Day" in Australia on November 13 as both a cassette and CD single, before releasing it as a CD maxi single in the United States a day later.

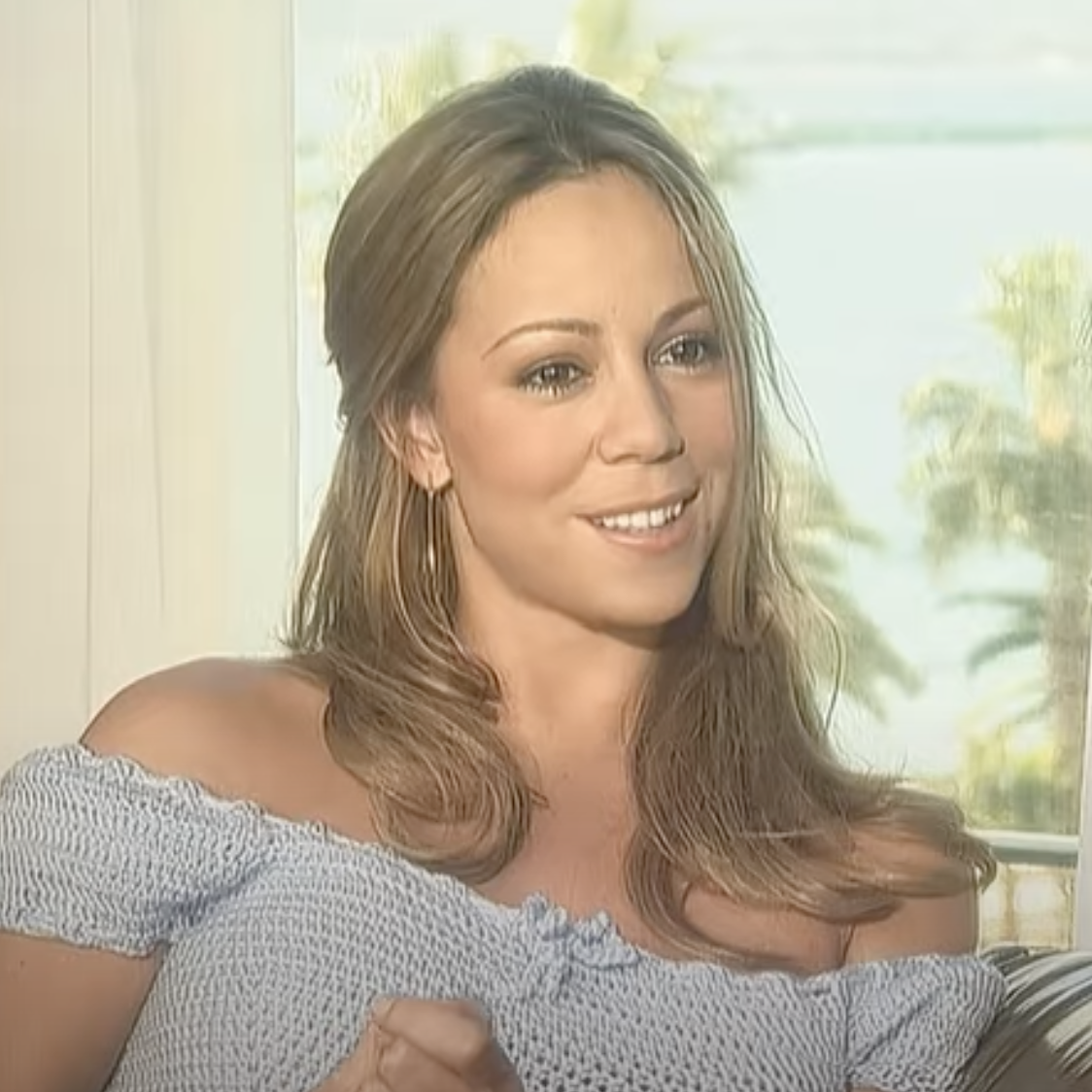
"One Sweet Day" remained the longest-running number-one song in Billboard Hot 100 history for 23 years. Carey (pictured) would reclaim this record with "All I Want for Christmas Is You" in 2025.

"One Sweet Day" debuted atop the Billboard Hot 100 chart dated December 2, 1995. It became the fourth song in history to debut at number one, opening with sales of 204,000 copies. Maintaining sixteen consecutive weeks atop the chart, "One Sweet Day" broke the joint record previously held by Houston's "I Will Always Love You" (1994) and Boyz II Men's "I'll Make Love to You" (1994) for the longest-running number-one song in Billboard Hot 100 history. This was the third time Boyz II Men had broken the record, following "End of the Road" (1992) and "I'll Make Love to You" (1994), which respectively spent thirteen and fourteen weeks at number one.

"One Sweet Day" was the third best-selling single of 1995 in the US, with sales of over 1.3 million. It ranked atop Billboard's decade-end Hot 100 chart as the most successful chart hit of the 1990s, a distinction Carey would achieve again in the 2000s with "We Belong Together" (2005). In 2017, the 16-week record was tied by Luis Fonsi and Daddy Yankee's "Despacito" featuring Justin Bieber. The record was later surpassed by Lil Nas X's "Old Town Road" featuring Billy Ray Cyrus in 2019, and it was tied in 2025 by Shaboozey's "A Bar Song (Tipsy)". Both spent 19 weeks at number one on the chart. However, Carey reclaimed the record with "All I Want for Christmas Is You", which spent 22 weeks atop the chart. The Recording Industry Association of America certified the song quadruple platinum.

"One Sweet Day" proved to be successful outside of the United States. After debuting at number eighty-nine, the song began a seven-week climb to number one on the Canadian RPM Top Singles chart dated January 22, 1996. Present on the chart for twenty-four weeks, "One Sweet Day" ranked twelfth on the RPM year-end chart of 1996. Entering at number two, the song also topped the singles chart in New Zealand; it departed from the chart in its seventeenth week. It was certified platinum by the Recording Industry Association of New Zealand (now Recorded Music NZ), denoting shipments of over 30,000 units. In Australia, "One Sweet Day" spent twenty-one weeks on the singles chart, peaking at number two. It received a double platinum certification from the Australian Recording Industry Association, indicating shipments of over 210,000 units. The song also charted at number two in Brazil and the Netherlands.

Elsewhere, "One Sweet Day" attained top-five charting positions in Ireland, Denmark, and France. In the lattermost region, the single received a gold certification from SNEP, representing shipments of 250,000 units. "One Sweet Day" charted at number six in both the United Kingdom and Norway and received gold certifications from the British Phonographic Industry and International Federation of the Phonographic Industry, respectively. The song also reached the top ten of the charts in Croatia, Sweden, Belgium, and Panama.

== Music video ==
The song's accompanying music video was directed by American independent filmmaker Larry Jordan. When Carey and Boyz II Men got together to record "One Sweet Day", they did not have enough time to re-unite and film a video. Instead, a filming crew was present during the song's recording, and filmed bits of Carey and Boyz recording the song. Walter Afanasieff later told Fred Bronson that shooting the video was "crazy", stating, "They had film crews and video guys, while I'm at the board trying to produce. And these guys were running around having a ball, because Mariah and them are laughing and screaming and they're being interviewed. And I'm tapping people on the shoulder. 'We've got to get to the microphone!' They're gone in a couple of hours, so I recorded everything they did, praying that it was enough." After the song's release, Carey expressed her contentment with the video, that she was happy a real music video was never filmed, fearing that no video could truly capture the song's "precious message." Critics agreed, feeling that the song was a perfect match for the video and its message. Aside from the recording sessions, the video also shared bits of Carey and Boyz bonding and sharing their ideas in the studio, where Carey felt they "bonded."

== Live performances ==
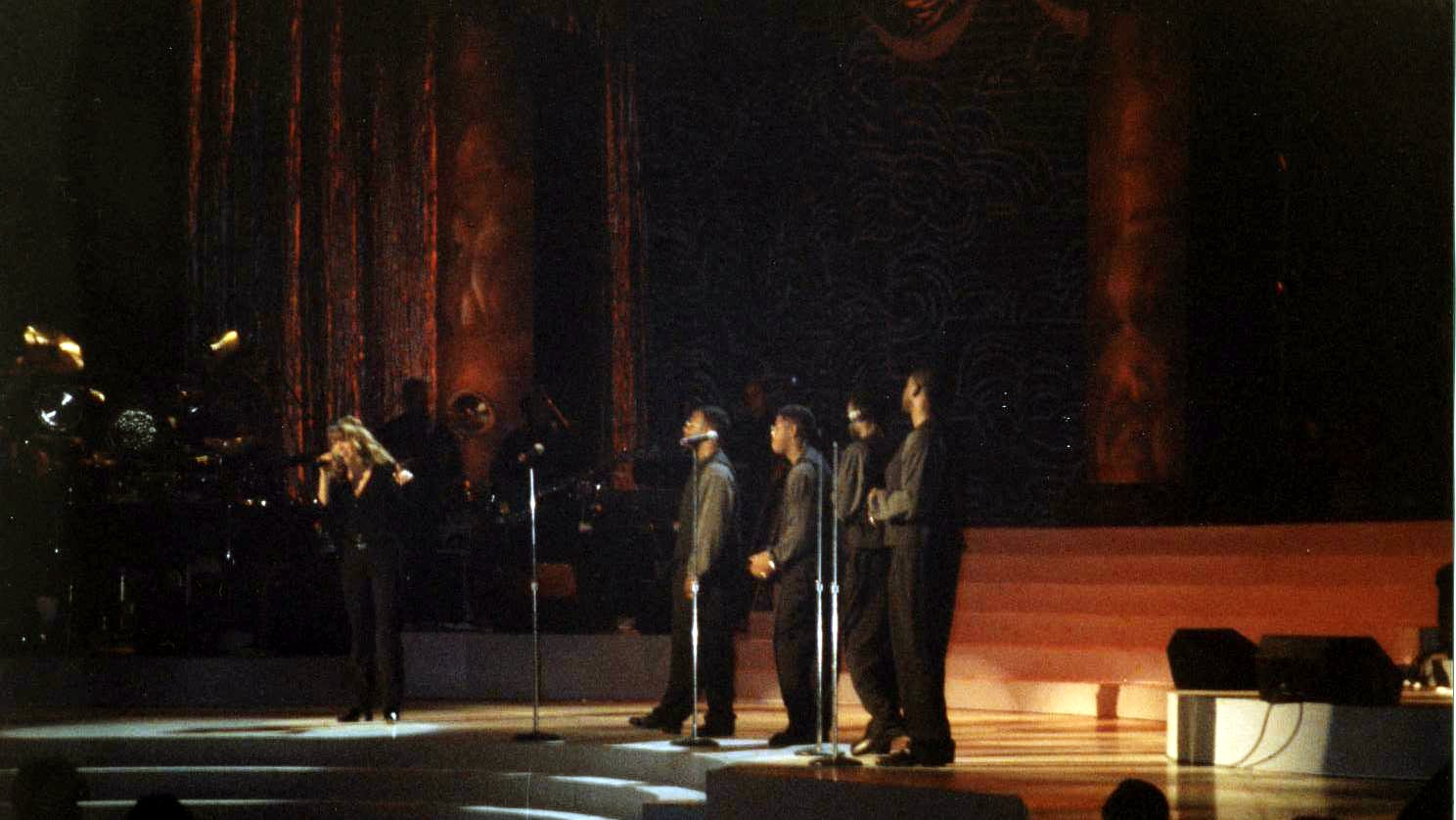
Carey and Boyz II Men performing "One Sweet Day" at Madison Square Garden on October 10, 1995

"One Sweet Day" was performed at the 38th Annual Grammy Awards, held on February 28, 1996. During the performance, Carey wore a long black dress and matching sleeveless blouse, while the group wore white jackets and black pants. After the song's bridge, a choir of male and female vocalists took place on the rafters placed over the stage, all wearing white gowns. The song was also performed at the memorial service for Princess Diana in September 1997, where other performers included Elton John. During the service and song recital, Carey wore a conservative long black sheer gown, with long golden curls. Boyz II Men all wore similar matching dark suit and garments. The song became part of Carey's BET Christmas special in 2001, where she sang the song alongside Boyz II Men. During the special, Carey wore a red gown in honor of the show's holiday theme, and featured a long golden hairstyle. One of the male vocalists had already been switched, as one of the group members had already resigned.

Aside from live television appearances, the song was performed on many of Carey's tours. "One Sweet Day" was performed at every show on her Daydream World Tour (1996), where Boyz II Men were featured on a large projection screen. The footage was taken from Carey's filmed concert at Madison Square Garden in late 1995, and was played in sync with Carey's verses. A similar concept was used for her Butterfly World Tour (1998), with the addition of several live back up vocalists joining on stage. Additionally, the song was performed on select dates on her The Adventures of Mimi tour (2006). During the tour's filmed show in Anaheim California, the group joined Carey live on stage and performed the song together. For the segment of the show, Carey wore a long turquoise gown, with several slits and cuts fashioned into the sides. During the Angels Advocate Tour in 2010, Carey performed a snippet of the song in Singapore, with Trey Lorenz filling in for the group's verses.

Carey also performed the song as a part of her 2015 Las Vegas residency, Mariah Carey Number 1's, with Lorenz reprising his role as well as Daniel Moore. She also performed the song as a part of her 2018–20 Las Vegas residency, The Butterfly Returns alongside Lorenz and Moore.

It was also performed on selected dates of her 2019 Caution World Tour.

== Cover versions ==
"One Sweet Day" was performed by the seven finalists on the seventh season of American Idol. The performance was taped due to the "Mariah Carey" themed week, where all the competitors sang songs from Carey's repertoire. The song was additionally sung on the fifth season of the UK TV show The X Factor, by the British boy-band JLS. Their performance received praise from all four judges, who commented how it was an "impossibly hard song to sing" because it was a "Mariah song." The song was also performed by John Adeleye during the seventh season of The X Factor. The theme of the night was "#1 songs." Shannon Magrane performed the song on the eleventh season of American Idol the week the contestants performed songs from their birth years. Andy Williams released a version in 2007 on his album, I Don't Remember Ever Growing Up.

== Track listing and formats ==
- Worldwide Cassette CD single
1. "One Sweet Day" (Album Version) – 4:41
2. "One Sweet Day" (Live Version from Fantasy: Mariah Carey at Madison Square Garden) – 5:08
- Japanese CD maxi-single
1. "One Sweet Day" (Album Version) – 4:42
2. "One Sweet Day" (Live Version from Fantasy: Mariah Carey at Madison Square Garden) – 5:10
3. "Open Arms" – 3:30
- UK CD maxi-single 1
1. "One Sweet Day" (Album Version) – 4:41
2. "One Sweet Day" (Sweet A Cappella) – 4:52
3. "One Sweet Day" (A Cappella) – 4:48
4. "One Sweet Day" (Chucky's Remix) – 4:51
5. "One Sweet Day" (Live Version from Fantasy: Mariah Carey at Madison Square Garden) – 5:08
- UK CD maxi-single 2
1. "One Sweet Day" (Album Version) – 4:44
2. "Fantasy" (Def Drums Mix) – 4:01
3. "Joy to the World" (Celebration Mix) – 7:58
4. "Joy to the World" (Club Mix) – 7:35
- US CD maxi-single
1. "One Sweet Day" (Album Version) – 4:41
2. "One Sweet Day" (Sweet A Cappella) – 4:52
3. "One Sweet Day" (A Cappella) – 4:48
4. "One Sweet Day" (Chucky's Remix) – 4:51
5. "One Sweet Day" (Live Version) – 5:08
6. "Fantasy" (Def Drums Mix) – 4:00
- One Sweet Day EP
1. "One Sweet Day" (Chucky's Remix) – 4:51
2. "One Sweet Day" (Sweet A Cappella) – 4:52
3. "One Sweet Day" (A Cappella) – 4:49
4. "One Sweet Day" (Live at Madison Square Garden - October 1995) – 5:09

== Credits and personnel ==
Credits are adapted from the Daydream liner notes.

- Mariah Carey – co-production, songwriting (music and lyrics), vocals
- Walter Afanasieff – co-production, songwriting (music)
- Nathan Morris – songwriting (lyrics), vocals
- Wanya Morris – songwriting (lyrics), vocals
- Shawn Stockman – songwriting (lyrics), vocals
- Michael McCary – songwriting (lyrics), vocals

== Charts ==
=== Weekly charts ===
Chart (1995–1996)	Peak position
Australia (ARIA)	2
Austria (Ö3 Austria Top 40)	25
Belgium (Ultratop 50 Flanders)	8
Belgium (Ultratop 50 Wallonia)	8
Brazil (ABPD)	2
Canada Top Singles (RPM)	1
Canada Retail Singles (The Record)	2
Canada Adult Contemporary (RPM)	1
Canada Contemporary Hit Radio (The Record)	1
Canada Hit Parade (The Record)	3
Croatia (HRT)	7
Denmark (Tracklisten)	5
Europe (Eurochart Hot 100)	6
Europe (European AC Top 25)	2
Europe (European Hit Radio)	2
Finland (Suomen virallinen lista)	16
France (SNEP)	5
France Airplay (SNEP)	1
Germany (Official German Charts)	25
Hungary Airplay (HCRA)	9
Iceland (Íslenski Listinn Topp 40)	20
Ireland (IRMA)	4
Israel (Israeli Singles Chart)	1
Italy Airplay (Music & Media)	4
Japan (Oricon)	87
Lithuania (M-1)	24
Netherlands (Dutch Top 40)	2
Netherlands (Single Top 100)	2
Netherlands Airplay (BDS)	3
New Zealand (Recorded Music NZ)	1
Norway (VG-lista)	6
Panama (UPI)	9
Scottish Singles Sales (Official Charts)	17
South Africa Airplay (EMA)	1
Spain Airplay (Top 40 Radio)	7
Sweden (Sverigetopplistan)	7
Switzerland (Schweizer Hitparade)	12
UK Singles (Official Charts)	6
UK Hip Hop/R&B (Official Charts)	1
UK Airplay (BDS)	8
UK Airplay (Media Monitor)	8
US Billboard Hot 100	1
US Adult Contemporary (Billboard)	1
US Adult Pop Airplay (Billboard)	1
US Dance Singles Sales (Billboard)	1
US Hot R&B/Hip-Hop Songs (Billboard)	2
US Pop Airplay (Billboard)	1
US Rhythmic Airplay (Billboard)	1
US Cash Box Top 100	1
US Cash Box Top 100 Urban Singles	1
US Adult Contemporary (Gavin Report)	1
US Top 40 (Gavin Report)	1
US Urban (Gavin Report)	1
US Adult Contemporary (Radio & Records)	1
US CHR/Pop (Radio & Records)	1
US CHR/Rhythmic (Radio & Records)	1
US Hot AC (Radio & Records)	1
US Urban (Radio & Records)	2
US Urban AC (Radio & Records)	1
Zimbabwe (ZIMA)	3

Chart (2002)	Peak position
US Hot Singles Sales (Billboard)	35

=== Year-end charts ===
Chart (1995)	Position
Australia (ARIA)	32
Brazil (Crowley)	57
Netherlands (Dutch Top 40)	178
Netherlands (Single Top 100)	87
New Zealand (RIANZ)	23
Sweden (Topplistan)	92
UK Singles (OCC)	60
US Adult Contemporary (Radio & Records)	68
US CHR/Rhythmic (Radio & Records)	61
US Hot AC (Radio & Records)	82

Chart (1996)	Position
Australia (ARIA)	40
Belgium (Ultratop 50 Flanders)	83
Belgium (Ultratop 50 Wallonia)	48
Brazil (Crowley)	5
Canada Top Singles (RPM)	12
Canada Adult Contemporary (RPM)	14
Europe (Eurochart Hot 100)	28
France (SNEP)	59
France Airplay (SNEP)	2
Israel (Israeli Singles Chart)	31
Netherlands (Dutch Top 40)	37
Netherlands (Single Top 100)	34
New Zealand (RIANZ)	32
Sweden (Topplistan)	86
Switzerland (Schweizer Hitparade)	49
US Billboard Hot 100	2
US Adult Contemporary (Billboard)	3
US Adult Top 40 (Billboard)	17
US Hot R&B Singles (Billboard)	15
US Maxi-Singles Sales (Billboard)	28
US Top 40/Mainstream (Billboard)	10
US Top 40/Rhythm-Crossover (Billboard)	11
US Adult Contemporary (Radio & Records)	4
US CHR/Pop (Radio & Records)	19
US CHR/Rhythmic (Radio & Records)	15
US Hot AC (Radio & Records)	17
US Urban (Radio & Records)	49
US Urban AC (Radio & Records)	18

=== Decade-end charts ===
Chart (1990–1999)	Position
US Billboard Hot 100	1

=== All-time charts ===
Chart	Position
US Billboard Hot 100	43

== Certifications and sales ==
Region	Certification	Certified units/sales
Australia (ARIA)	3× Platinum	210,000^{‡}
France (SNEP)	Gold	250,000^{*}
New Zealand (RMNZ)	Platinum	30,000^{‡}
Norway (IFPI Norway)	Gold	
United Kingdom (BPI)	Gold	400,000^{‡}
United States (RIAA)	4× Platinum	4,000,000^{‡}
^{*} Sales figures based on certification alone.^{‡} Sales+streaming figures based on certification alone.

== Release history ==
Release dates and formats for "One Sweet Day"
Region	Date	Format	Label	Ref.
Australia	November 13, 1995	Cassette single; CD single	Columbia	
United States	November 14, 1995	CD maxi single	Columbia	
United Kingdom	November 27, 1995	Cassette single; CD single	Columbia	
Japan	November 30, 1995	Mini CD single	Sony Music Japan	

== See also ==
- List of Billboard Hot 100 chart achievements and milestones
- List of Billboard Hot 100 number-one singles of 1995
- List of Billboard Hot 100 number-one singles of 1996
- List of Hot Adult Contemporary number ones of 1995
- List of Hot Adult Contemporary number ones of 1996

== Sources ==
- Bielen, Kenneth (2016). The Lyrics of Civility: Biblical Images & Popular Music Lyrics in American Culture. Taylor & Francis. ISBN 978-1-3177-1350-0.
- Harvey, John H. (2014). Perspectives On Loss: A Sourcebook. Taylor & Francis. ISBN 978-1-317-77192-0.
- Nickson, Chris (1998). Mariah Carey Revisited: Her Story. St. Martin's Press. ISBN 978-0-312-19512-0.
- Perone, James E. (2021). Listen to Soul!: Exploring a Musical Genre. Bloomsbury Publishing. ISBN 979-8-216-11201-3.
- Shapiro, Marc (2001). Mariah Carey: The Unauthorized Biography. ECW Press. ISBN 978-1-55022-444-3.
