= Evolution (Boyz II Men album) =

Studio album by Boyz II Men
- Released: September 23, 1997
- Genres: R&B; soul; pop; hip-hop soul
- Length: 61:48
- Label: Motown
- Producers: Boyz II Men; Babyface; Jimmy Jam and Terry Lewis; Sean "Diddy" Combs; Ron "Amen-Ra" Lawrence; Keith Crouch; Shawn Stockman

Boyz II Men chronology
The Remix Collection (1995)	Evolution (1997)	The Ballad Collection (2000)

Singles from Evolution
- 1. "4 Seasons of Loneliness" Released: September 8, 1997; 2. "A Song for Mama" Released: November 25, 1997; 3. "Can't Let Her Go" Released: 1998; 4. "Doin' Just Fine" Released: July 28, 1998

Evolution is the fourth studio album by American R&B quartet Boyz II Men, released on September 23, 1997. It is their final album released on Motown Records. A Spanish language version, Evolución, was also issued. The Spanish edition won the Billboard Latin Music Award for Pop Album of the Year by a New Artist.

== Background ==
On August 20, 1997, Boyz II Men held a press conference to talk about their first album since 1994's II. They were under pressure with their last two albums cumulatively selling almost 30 million copies worldwide. With Evolution, they worked with their regular collaborators, including Jimmy Jam and Terry Lewis and Babyface.

== Promotion ==
They appeared on many talk shows including The Rosie O'Donnell Show, The Oprah Winfrey Show, The Tonight Show with Jay Leno, The Vibe Show, The Keenen Ivory Wayans Show and MTV Live. The album was released on September 23, and that night, Boyz II Men signed copies of the album at the Virgin Megastore in New York City. In October 1998, Boyz II Men went to Japan and Europe to promote the album, and during that year they embarked on the Evolution Tour.

The first single released from the album, "4 Seasons of Loneliness", was released on September 8, 1997. The song was Boyz II Men's highest debut on the Billboard Hot 100 Singles. It debuted at number two, behind Mariah Carey's "Honey". The following week, the single went to number one, became their fifth (and to date, last) chart-topper. 4 Seasons of Loneliness became Boyz II Men's sixth platinum single. Later that year, the second single, "A Song for Mama", was released, a track which already appeared in film Soul Food and its soundtrack. The single reached number seven on the Billboard Hot 100 and number one on the R&B Singles Chart, making Boyz II Men the only group in history to have seven platinum singles in the United States.

== Critical reception ==
Professional ratings
Review scores
Source	Rating
AllMusic	3/5 stars
Entertainment Weekly	C
Los Angeles Times	3/4 stars
Robert Christgau	(choice cut)
Rolling Stone	2/5 stars

AllMusic editor Stephen Thomas Erlewine editor Stephen Thomas Erlewine observed that Evolution "is supposed to capture Boyz II Men in full maturity," but "sounds surprisingly similar to their blockbuster II." He noted that the group focused on "smooth ballads" delivered with "typical grace," yet argued that their "signature sound [was] beginning to sound like a formula" and that they "fail to offer any new twists." Entertainment Weekly's Jeremy Helligar agreed that while Boyz II Men's style remains technically strong, it felt repetitive and uninspired. He remarked that their "harmonies glide ever so smoothly," but dismissed this as "old news," adding that their focus on love and romance makes the album feel like "a quiet storm we've weathered before." Helligar concluded that true artistic growth would require them to "actually entertain us," calling such a shift "evolution."

Jon Pareles of The New York Times noted that while Boyz II Men lean on their "image as an old-fashioned vocal group," on Evolution they attempt to be "less wimpy," with songs addressing cheating and denying an ex a second chance. He highlighted their expansion into "electronic soundscapes," but found their efforts to sound lascivious or modern "awkward." Despite some experimentation, Pareles concluded that Evolution remains "nearly as unctuous as the group’s previous multimillion-sellers." Connie Johnson of The Los Angeles Times observed that the group had largely shed their boyishness, with the album showing a move to "put childish things aside," though some tracks were "low on energy." She concluded that Boyz II Men maintained their dignity without begging for love, suggesting that "to go forth and beg no more seems to be Boyz II Men’s first step" toward true evolution. Rolling Stone critic Ernest Hardy argued that despite Evolution’s claims of maturity, Boyz II Men "still sound like boys." He wrote that they "haven't tampered with an iota of their formula," relying on "sappy, sound-alike ballads" and clichéd lyrics.

== Commercial performance ==
Evolution debuted and peaked at number one on the US Billboard 200 with first week sales of 211,000 copies. It also reached the top of Billboard's Top R&B/Hip-Hop Albums chart, becoming the band's third album to do so. However, the album spent only one week at the number-one spot and quickly fell down the charts. Evolution sold two million copies in the United States and over four million copies worldwide.

== Track listing ==
Evolution track listing
No.	Title	Writer(s)	Producer(s)	Length
1.	"Doin' Just Fine"	Shawn Stockman	Stockman; Boyz II Men^{[a]}	5:30
2.	"Never"	Kenneth "Babyface" Edmonds; Michael McCary; Nathan Morris; Stockman; Wanya Morris	Babyface; Boyz II Men^{[a]}	4:48
3.	"4 Seasons of Loneliness"	James Harris III; Terry Lewis	Jimmy Jam and Terry Lewis	4:52
4.	"Girl in the Life Magazine"	Edmonds	Babyface; Boyz II Men^{[a]}	3:29
5.	"A Song for Mama"	Edmonds	Babyface	5:02
6.	"Can You Stand the Rain"	Harris; Lewis	Boyz II Men	4:02
7.	"Can't Let Her Go"	Sean Combs; Ron "Amen-Ra" Lawrence; Steven Jordan; McCary; W. Morris; Stockman; N. Morris; Gregory Johnson; Larry Blackmon	Combs; Lawrence; Stevie J	4:30
8.	"Baby C'mon"	Keith Crouch; McCary; W. Morris; Stockman; N. Morris	Crouch	4:36
9.	"Come On"	Combs; Jeffrey Walker; McCary; W. Morris; Stockman; N. Morris; Chad Elliott; George Pearson; Gordon Sumner	Combs; J-Dub; Boyz II Men	5:01
10.	"All Night Long"	John "Jubu" Smith; Crouch; McCary; W. Morris; Stockman; N. Morris	Crouch	5:15
11.	"Human II (Don't Turn Your Back on Me)"	Harris; Lewis; McCary; W. Morris; Stockman; N. Morris	Jam and Lewis	4:43
12.	"To the Limit"	Walker; McCary; W. Morris; Stockman; N. Morris; Combs; Jordan; Bobby Caldwell; Alfons Kettner	Combs; J-Dub; Stevie J; Boyz II Men	5:02
13.	"Dear God"	Durrel Bottoms; Jamar Jones; McCary; W. Morris; Stockman; Todd Huston; Vivian S. Green; Richard Smallwood	Boyz II Men; Bottoms; Jones^{[a]}	4:58

Japanese edition bonus track
No.	Title	Writer(s)	Producer(s)	Length
14.	"Just Hold On"	Edmonds	Babyface	4:49
15.	"I Can Love You"	McCary; W. Morris; Stockman; N. Morris	Boyz II Men	4:56

French edition bonus track
No.	Title	Writer(s)	Producer(s)	Length
15.	"Can't Let Her Go (original mix) (featuring Driver)"	Sean Combs; Ron "Amen-Ra" Lawrence; Steven Jordan; McCary; W. Morris; Stockman; N. Morris; Gregory Johnson; Larry Blackmon	Combs; Lawrence; Stevie J	4:15

=== Spanish version ===
1. "4 Estaciones de Soledad (4 Seasons of Loneliness)"
2. "A Mí Me Va Bien (Doin' Just Fine)"
3. "Te Doy Mi Amor (I Can Love You)"
4. "La Chica de la Revista (Girl in the Life Magazine)"
5. "Una Canción para Mamá (A Song for Mama)"
6. "Yo Te Voy a Amar (I'll Make Love to You)"
7. "No Dejemos Que Muera el Amor (Water Runs Dry)"
8. "Me Rindo Ante Ti (On Bended Knee)"
9. "Yesterday" (Spanish version)
10. "Al Final del Camino (End of the Road)"

Notes

- ^{^[a]} denotes co-producer

== Charts ==
=== Weekly charts ===
Weekly chart performance for Evolution
Chart (1997)	Peak position
Australian Albums (ARIA)	6
Belgian Albums (Ultratop Wallonia)	45
Canadian Albums (Billboard)	2
Canadian R&B Albums (SoundScan)	1
Dutch Albums (Album Top 100)	7
European Albums Chart	18
French Albums (SNEP)	7
German Albums (Offizielle Top 100)	8
Japanese Albums (Oricon)	8
Malaysian Albums (IFPI)	8
New Zealand Albums (RMNZ)	6
Singapore Albums (SPVA)	10
Swedish Albums (Sverigetopplistan)	25
Swiss Albums (Schweizer Hitparade)	20
UK Albums (Official Charts)	12
UK R&B Albums (Official Charts)	2
US Billboard 200	1
US Top R&B/Hip-Hop Albums (Billboard)	1
Zimbabwe Albums (ZIMA)	10

=== Year-end charts ===
1997 year-end chart performance for Evolution
Chart (1997)	Position
Australian Albums (ARIA)	91
Canadian Albums (SoundScan)	66
Canadian R&B Albums (SoundScan)	12
US Billboard 200	68
US Top R&B/Hip-Hop Albums (Billboard)	45

1998 year-end chart performance for Evolution
Chart (1998)	Position
Canadian R&B Albums (SoundScan)	54
US Billboard 200	66
US Top R&B/Hip-Hop Albums (Billboard)	53

== Certifications ==
Certifications for Evolution
Region	Certification	Certified units/sales
Australia (ARIA)	Gold	35,000^{^}
Canada (Music Canada)	2× Platinum	200,000^{^}
Hong Kong (IFPI Hong Kong)	Platinum	20,000^{*}
Japan (RIAJ)	2× Platinum	400,000^{^}
United Kingdom (BPI)	Silver	60,000^{*}
United States (RIAA)	2× Platinum	2,000,000^{^}
^{*} Sales figures based on certification alone.^{^} Shipments figures based on certification alone.

== See also ==
- List of number-one albums of 1997 (U.S.)
- List of number-one R&B albums of 1997 (U.S.)
