= Nathan Michael Shawn Wanya =

Studio album by Boyz II Men
- Released: September 12, 2000
- Recorded: 1999–2000
- Studios: Paramount Recording Studios (Hollywood, California); Stonecreek Recording Studios; Studio 77 (Gladwyne, Pennsylvania); Triangle Sound (Atlanta, Georgia); Westlake Audio (Los Angeles, California); Quad Recording Studios (New York City)
- Genre: R&B
- Length: 63:20
- Language: English
- Label: Universal
- Producers: Kevin "Shekspere" Briggs; Shep Crawford; Jazz Nixon; Mervyn Warren; Jamar Jones; Durell Bottoms

Boyz II Men chronology
The Ballad Collection (2000)	Nathan Michael Shawn Wanya (2000)	Legacy: The Greatest Hits Collection (2001)

Singles from Nathan Michael Shawn Wanya
- 1. "Pass You By" Released: July 11, 2000; 2. "Thank You in Advance" Released: December 12, 2000

Nathan Michael Shawn Wanya is the fifth album by R&B group Boyz II Men in 2000. The only LP issued during the group's brief contract with Universal Records, its title reflects the album's ambitions; unlike previous records, the majority of the tracks were written and produced by Boyz II Men themselves. The two singles, "Pass You By" and "Thank You in Advance", both performed below expectations on the charts.

== Critical reception ==
Professional ratings
Review scores
Source	Rating
AllMusic	4/5 stars
Entertainment Weekly	B
The Rolling Stone Album Guide	2/5 stars

AllMusic editor Stephen Thomas Erlewine wrote that Nathan Michael Shawn Wanya was Boyz II Men's "first full-fledged adult album," mostly self-written and produced, delivering "lush ballads and swinging hip-hop soul" that were "pleasant" and sometimes "seductive or effortlessly danceable," while cutting back on "vocal histrionics" to create their "most mature yet" record. Similarly, Connie Johnson from The Los Angeles Times praised the album for showing a "grown-up, sophisticated side," balancing "fluffy moments" with surprisingly mature music, highlighting tracks like the "Beautiful Women," the ballad "I Do" with its "sepia-toned, doo-wop sentiments," and Shep Crawford's "Thank You in Advance" for its "heart-tugging poignancy" that contrasts with today's "edgy cynicism."

Entertainment Weekly critic Josh Tyrangiel wrote that on Nathan Michael Shawn Wanya, Boyz II Men "drop the balladeering [...] in favor of mature, danceable, even occasionally sexy tracks" that, while "not perfect," provide a "respite from their past shtick," with hints of "libido and open dissatisfaction with playing nice." Kris Adams from The Stranger noted that Boyz II Men, with Nathan Michael Shawn Wanya, "hope to tap into the success of the current wave of boy bands," whose popularity is "based on the sound that Boyz II Men used in the first place."

== Commercial performance ==
Their first album in three years, Nathan Michael Shawn Wanya debuted and peaked at number four on the US Billboard 200 on first-week sales of slightly less than 133,000 copies. A breakaway from their previous album, it only spent three weeks on the chart. By August 2001, it had sold 686,000 copies.

== Track listing ==
Standard version
No.	Title	Writer(s)	Producer(s)	Length
1.	"Beautiful Women"	She'kspere; Nathan Morris; Michael McCary; Shawn Stockman; Wanya Morris; Kandi Burruss	She'kspere	4:09
2.	"Step On Up"	N. Morris; McCary; Stockman; W. Morris	Boyz II Men	4:54
3.	"Good Guy"	She'kspere; Burruss; N. Morris; McCary; Stockman; W. Morris	She'kspere	3:49
4.	"Bounce, Shake, Move, Swing"	N. Morris; McCary; Stockman; W. Morris	Boyz II Men	4:19
5.	"What the Deal"	N. Morris; McCary; Stockman; W. Morris	Anthony "Shep" Crawford	4:25
6.	"I Finally Know"	N. Morris; McCary; Stockman; W. Morris; Anthony "Shep" Crawford; Shae Jones	Anthony "Shep" Crawford	5:05
7.	"Pass You By"	Stockman	Boyz II Men	4:26
8.	"Dreams"	Todd Huston; LaMenga Kafi; W. Morris; Jamar Jones; Durrel Bottoms; N. Morris; McCary; Stockman	Boyz II Men	3:47
9.	"I Do"	Mervyn Warren	Mervyn Warren	4:11
10.	"Thank You in Advance"	Anthony "Shep" Crawford	Anthony "Shep" Crawford	4:11
11.	"Never Go Away"	Stockman	Boyz II Men	5:06
12.	"Lovely"	N. Morris; McCary; Stockman; W. Morris	Boyz II Men	5:30
13.	"Know What You Want"	N. Morris	Boyz II Men	5:17
14.	"Do You Remember"	N. Morris; McCary; Stockman; W. Morris	Boyz II Men	4:17

Japanese version (bonus tracks)
No.	Title	Writer(s)	Length
15.	"I Miss You"	N. Morris	5:36
16.	"Marry Me"	N. Morris; McCary; Stockman; W. Morris	4:06
17.	"Darlin'"	N. Morris; McCary; Stockman; W. Morris	4:34

- Credits adapted from liner notes.

== Charts ==
=== Weekly charts ===
Weekly chart performance for Nathan Michael Shawn Wanya
Chart (2000)	Peak position
Australian Albums (ARIA)	18
Canadian Albums (Billboard)	16
Dutch Albums (Album Top 100)	41
French Albums (SNEP)	23
German Albums (Offizielle Top 100)	24
Japanese Albums (Oricon)	6
Swiss Albums (Schweizer Hitparade)	49
UK Albums (Official Charts)	54
UK R&B Albums (Official Charts)	10
US Billboard 200	4
US Top R&B/Hip-Hop Albums (Billboard)	3

=== Year-end charts ===
Year-end chart performance for Nathan Michael Shawn Wanya
Chart (2000)	Position
South Korean International Albums (MIAK)	39
US Billboard 200	200

== Certifications ==
Certifications for Nathan Michael Shawn Wanya
Region	Certification	Certified units/sales
Canada (Music Canada)	Gold	50,000^{^}
Japan (RIAJ)	Platinum	200,000^{^}
United States (RIAA)	Gold	500,000^{^}
^{^} Shipments figures based on certification alone.
