= Doin' Just Fine =

1998 single by Boyz II Men

Single by Boyz II Men

from the album Evolution
- Released: July 28, 1998
- Recorded: 1997
- Genre: R&B; soul
- Length: 5:30 (album version); 4:14 (single edit)
- Label: Motown
- Songwriter: Shawn Stockman
- Producer: Shawn Stockman

Boyz II Men singles chronology
"Can't Let Her Go" (1998)	"Doin' Just Fine" (1998)	"I Will Get There" (1999)

Music video
- "Doin' Just Fine" on YouTube

"Doin' Just Fine" is a song performed by American contemporary R&B group Boyz II Men. It is the opening track on their third studio album Evolution and serves as the album's fourth and final single. Written and produced by group member Shawn Stockman, it peaked at number 33 on the Billboard R&B/Hip-Hop Airplay chart.

== Music video ==
The official music video for "Doin' Just Fine" was directed by Christopher Erskin. The video was shot in Portland, Jamaica. It depicts the various members going through breakups, but ultimately "doing just fine" as the lyrics suggest while they sing reflective lyrics about their relationships.

== Certifications ==
Certifications for "Doin' Just Fine"
Region	Certification	Certified units/sales
United States (RIAA)	Platinum	1,000,000^{‡}
^{‡} Sales+streaming figures based on certification alone.
