= Pass You By =

2000 single by Boyz II Men

Single by Boyz II Men

from the album Nathan Michael Shawn Wanya
- Released: July 11, 2000
- Length: 4:26 (main version); 3:59 (radio version)
- Label: Universal
- Songwriter(s): Shawn Stockman
- Producer(s): Shawn Stockman

Boyz II Men singles chronology
| "I Will Get There" (1998) | "Pass You By" (2000) | "Thank You in Advance" (2000) |

"Pass You By" is a song by American R&B quartet Boyz II Men, released from their fifth studio album, Nathan Michael Shawn Wanya (2000), on July 11, 2000. "Pass You By" was commercially unsuccessful, failing to appear on the US Billboard Hot 100 chart, peaking at number four on the Billboard Bubbling Under Hot 100. "Pass You By" also peaked at number 13 in Australia, number 73 in France, and number 98 in the Netherlands. The song was nominated for Best R&B Performance by a Duo or Group at the 2001 Grammy Awards.

== Track listing ==
European CD single

1. "Pass You By" (radio edit)
2. "Darlin"
3. "Rose and a Honeycomb"
4. "Pass You By" (instrumental)

== Charts ==
| Chart (2000) | Peak position |
|---|---|
| Australia (ARIA) | 13 |
| France (SNEP) | 73 |
| Netherlands (Single Top 100) | 98 |
| US Bubbling Under Hot 100 (Billboard) | 4 |
| US Hot R&B/Hip-Hop Songs (Billboard) | 27 |
| US Pop Airplay (Billboard) | 39 |

== Release history ==
| Region | Date | Format(s) | Label(s) | Ref(s). |
|---|---|---|---|---|
| United States | July 11, 2000 | Rhythmic contemporary radio | Universal | |
| Japan | August 23, 2000 | CD | Universal | |
| United States | September 11, 2000 | Adult contemporary; hot adult contemporary radio | Universal | |
| United States | September 12, 2000 | Contemporary hit radio | Universal | |
