= Thank You in Advance =

2000 single by Boyz II Men

Single by Boyz II Men

from the album Nathan Michael Shawn Wanya
- B-side: "Leaders of the Pack"
- Released: October 2, 2000
- Length: 4:11
- Label: Universal
- Songwriter: Shep Crawford
- Producer: Shep Crawford

Boyz II Men singles chronology
"Pass You By" (2000)	"Thank You in Advance" (2000)	"The Color of Love" (2002)

"Thank You in Advance" is the second and final single released from American vocal group Boyz II Men's fifth studio album, Nathan Michael Shawn Wanya. It was serviced to US radio on October 2, 2000, and was released commercially in Japan the following month. The song peaked at number 80 on the US Billboard Hot 100 chart in January 2001, marking the group's last appearance on the Hot 100 as of 2026.

== Track listings ==
US version

1. "Thank You in Advance" (LP version) – 4:14
2. "Leaders of the Pack" – 4:26

Japanese version

1. "Thank You in Advance"
2. "Thank You in Advance" (instrumental)
3. "Thank You in Advance" (a cappella)
4. "Rose in a Honeycomb"

== Charts ==
Chart (2001)	Peak position
US Billboard Hot 100	80
US Hot R&B/Hip-Hop Songs (Billboard)	40

== Release history ==
Region	Date	Format(s)	Label	Ref.
United States	October 2, 2000	Urban radio	Universal	
United States	October 3, 2000	Rhythmic contemporary radio	Universal	
Japan	November 29, 2000	CD	Universal	
United States	December 18, 2000	Adult contemporary; hot adult contemporary radio	Universal	
United States	December 19, 2000	Contemporary hit radio	Universal	
