= The Color of Love (song) =

- USA version cover

Single by Boyz II Men

from the album Full Circle
- Released: June 11, 2002
- Recorded: 2002
- Genre: R&B
- Length: 4:50
- Label: Arista
- Songwriter: Babyface
- Producer: Babyface

Boyz II Men singles chronology
"Thank You in Advance" (2000)	"The Color of Love" (2002)	"Relax Your Mind" (2002)

European version cover

"The Color of Love" is the lead single by R&B vocal group Boyz II Men from the album Full Circle.

== Track listing ==
1. "The Color of Love"
2. "The Color of Love" (Instrumental)
3. "The Color of Love" (Suggested Call Out Research Hook #1)
4. "The Color of Love" (Suggested Call Out Research Hook #2)
- USA Catalog No. ARPCD-5091

US Promo CD

1. The Color Of Love (Radio Edit) 4:19
2. The Color Of Love (Instrumental) 4:40
3. The Color Of Love (Call Out Research Hook # 1) 0:10
4. The Color Of Love (Call Out Research Hook # 2) 0:10

== Music video ==
Regarding the music video for "The Color of Love", Arista Records president Antonio "L.A." Reid said: "Boyz II Men have always maintained a certain mood with their music, and that couldn't be better reflected than with the theme of this clip--unity and brotherhood, a multi-cultural celebration in these difficult times", he said via a statement. "There is no better group to pull it off than these four guys".

== Credits and personnel ==
Credits adapted from the liner notes of Full Circle.

- Boyz II Men: all vocals
- Babyface: writer, producer, keyboards and drum programming
- Paul Boutin: recording and mixing engineer
- Tim Ronaghan and Jason Dale: assistant engineers
- Ivy Skoff: production coordinator

== Charts ==
Chart (2002)	Peak position
US Adult Contemporary (Billboard)	26
US Hot R&B/Hip-Hop Songs (Billboard)	51
