= I Will Get There =

1998 single by Boyz II Men

Single by Boyz II Men

from the album The Prince of Egypt
- Released: December 29, 1998
- Recorded: 1998
- Genre: R&B; gospel
- Length: 4:23
- Label: DreamWorks, Motown
- Songwriter: Diane Warren
- Producers: Jimmy Jam and Terry Lewis, Boyz II Men

Boyz II Men singles chronology
"Can't Let Her Go" (1998)	"I Will Get There" (1998)	"Pass You By" (1999)

"I Will Get There" is a single recorded by Boyz II Men in 1998 for the soundtrack of the DreamWorks musical animated film The Prince of Egypt. The track spent 7 weeks on the Billboard Hot 100 chart, and, as of May 2018, remains to be the group's final Top 40 hit.

The song was written by Diane Warren and produced by Jimmy Jam, Terry Lewis and Boyz II Men. The group sings the song a cappella for the recording, which peaked at number thirty-two on the Hot 100 when released as a single. The music video for "I Will Get There" was directed by Darren Grant.

== Track listing ==
1. "I Will Get There" (Build Up Edit) – 4:06
2. "I Will Get There" (Build Up Mix) – 4:17
3. "I Will Get There" (LP version) – 4:20
4. "I Will Get There" (a cappella with strings) – 4:18

== Certifications ==
Certifications for "I Will Get There"
Region	Certification	Certified units/sales
United States (RIAA)	Gold	500,000^{‡}
^{‡} Sales+streaming figures based on certification alone.
