= Hits Volume 1 =

Studio album by The Piano Guys
- Released: December 1, 2011
- Recorded: 2011; Draper, Utah (TPG Studios); Sandy, Utah (Big Idea Studios)
- Genre: Classical crossover
- Length: 45:44
- Label: Self-released
- Producers: Al van der Beek, Steven Sharp Nelson, Jon Schmidt

The Piano Guys chronology
Hits Volume 1 (2011)	The Piano Guys (2012)

Hits Volume 1 (sometimes referred to as YouTube Hits Vol. 1) is the debut studio album by American musical group the Piano Guys. It was self-released in December 2011 as a means to distribute high-quality audio recordings of their most popular YouTube videos at the time. Many of the songs have since been re-released on The Piano Guys and The Piano Guys 2.

The final two tracks are listed as only available on the Limited Founder's Edition, but following the Piano Guys' record deal with Sony Masterworks, no other version of the album was released.

== Track listing ==
No.	Title	Writer(s)	Arranger(s)	Length
1.	"Michael Meets Mozart"	Jon Schmidt, Steven Sharp Nelson		5:18
2.	"Moonlight" ( (Note: Inspired by/based upon Ludwig van Beethoven's Moonlight Sonata & the melody from his Symphony No. 7, Op. 92 2nd movement (Allegretto)))	Nelson		3:28
3.	"Without You"	Taio Cruz, David Guetta, Frederic Riesterer, Rico Love, Raymond Usher, Giorgo Tuinfort	van der Beek, Schmidt, Nelson	3:39
4.	"The Cello Song" ( (Note: Inspired by/based upon Johann Sebastian Bach's Unaccompanied Cello Suite No. 1 Prelude in G))	Nelson		3:18
5.	"Rolling in the Deep" ( (Note: Includes melody from Gustav Holst's "Jupiter" from The Planets Suite))	Adele Laurie Blue Adkins, Paul Epworth	Nelson, Schmidt, van der Beek	3:54
6.	"Cello Wars" (Radio Edit)	John Williams (Note: Based upon original pieces/film score by John Williams: Imperial March, The Duel of the Fates, May the Force Be With You, Cantina Band, Star Wars (Main Theme))	van der Beek, Nelson	3:11
7.	"O Fortuna" (from Carmina Burana)	Carl Orff	Nelson, Schmidt, van der Beek	3:22
8.	"Bring Him Home" (from Les Misérables)	Claude-Michel Schönberg	Schmidt, Nelson	4:17
9.	"Charlie Brown Medley" (Linus & Lucy/Track Meet)	Vince Guaraldi	Schmidt, Nelson	3:03
10.	"Rock Meets Rachmaninoff"	Schmidt		3:21
11.	"All of Me"	Schmidt		3:04

Limited Founder's Edition
No.	Title	Writer(s)	Arranger(s)	Length
12.	"More Than Words" (Instrumental Version (Note: Includes melody from J.S. Bach's Jesu, Joy of Man's Desiring))	Nuno Bettencourt, Gary Cherone	Nelson, Schmidt, van der Beek	3:58
13.	"Twinkle Lullaby"	Traditional	Schmidt, Nelson	1:51
Total length:				45:44

== Personnel ==
Per liner notes

The Piano Guys

- Steven Sharp Nelson – Cello Guy
- Jon Schmidt – Piano Guy
- Al van der Beek – Music Guy
- Paul Anderson – "The" Guy
- Tel Stewart – Video Guy
- Shaye Scott – Video Guy

Additional musicians

- Julie Nelson, Catherine Bohman, Alyssa Powers, Amy Talbot – Choir on "O Fortuna"

== Charts ==
=== Weekly charts ===
Chart (2012)	Peak position
US Billboard Classical Albums	7
US Billboard New Age Albums	1

=== Year-end charts ===
Chart (2012)	Position
US Billboard Classical Albums	30
US Billboard New Age Albums	7
