= The Piano Guys 2 =

Studio album by The Piano Guys
- Released: May 7, 2013
- Recorded: 2011–13; Draper, Utah (TPG Studios); Sandy, Utah (Big Idea Studios)
- Genre: Classical crossover
- Length: 42:44
- Label: Portrait
- Producer: Al van der Beek, Steven Sharp Nelson, Jon Schmidt

The Piano Guys chronology
The Piano Guys (2012)	The Piano Guys 2 (2013)	A Family Christmas (2013)

The Piano Guys 2 is the third studio album by the American musical group The Piano Guys. It was released on May 7, 2013, by Portrait (a division of Sony Masterworks). The album made its chart début at number 38 on the US Billboard 200.

The deluxe version of The Piano Guys 2 has a DVD featuring 11 music videos.

== Track listing ==
U.S. & Canada Version
No.	Title	Writer(s)	Arranger(s)	Length
1.	"Begin Again"	Taylor Swift, Johann Sebastian Bach	Al van der Beek, Jon Schmidt, Steven Sharp Nelson	4:09
2.	"Rockelbel's Canon (Pachelbel Canon in D)"	Johann Pachelbel, Nelson	Nelson	3:48
3.	"Mission Impossible" (featuring Lindsey Stirling)	Boris Claudio (Lalo) Schifrin, Wolfgang Amadeus Mozart	Nelson, van der Beek, Lindsey Stirling, Schmidt	3:46
4.	"Lord of the Rings"	Howard Shore, Philippa Jane Boyens	van der Beek, Schmidt, Nelson	5:39
5.	"Berlin"	Nelson, van der Beek		4:00
6.	"All of Me"	Schmidt		3:02
7.	"Just the Way You Are"	Philip Lawrence, Bruno Mars, Khari Cain, Ari Levine, Khalil Walton	van der Beek, Schmidt, Nelson	4:21
8.	"Nearer My God to Thee"	Lowell Mason, Traditional	James Stevens, Nelson	3:01
9.	"Waterfall"	Schmidt		3:04
10.	"Charlie Brown Medley"	Vince Guaraldi	van der Beek, Schmidt, Nelson	3:04
11.	"Me and My Cello (Happy Together)"	Garry Bonner, Alan Lee Gordon	Nelson, van der Beek	3:06
12.	"Twinkle Lullaby"	Traditional	van der Beek, Schmidt, Nelson	1:51
Total length:				42:51

Barnes & Noble Exclusive Edition
No.	Title	Length
13.	"More Than Words"	3:56
14.	"Can't Help Falling in Love"	4:15
15.	"Begin Again" (featuring Megan Nicole and Alex Goot)	4:09
Total length:		55:11

International Version
No.	Title	Writer(s)	Arranger(s)	Length
1.	"Begin Again"	Taylor Swift, Johann Sebastian Bach	Al van der Beek, Jon Schmidt, Steven Sharp Nelson	4:09
2.	"Rockelbel's Canon (Pachelbel Canon in D)"	Johann Pachelbel, Nelson	Nelson	3:48
3.	"Mission Impossible" (featuring Lindsey Stirling)	Boris Claudio (Lalo) Schifrin, Wolfgang Amadeus Mozart	Nelson, van der Beek, Lindsey Stirling, Schmidt	3:46
4.	"Lord of the Rings"	Howard Shore, Philippa Jane Boyens	van der Beek, Schmidt, Nelson	5:39
5.	"Berlin"	Nelson, van der Beek		4:00
6.	"All of Me"	Schmidt		3:02
7.	"Just the Way You Are"	Philip Lawrence, Bruno Mars, Khari Cain, Ari Levine, Khalil Walton	van der Beek, Schmidt, Nelson	4:21
8.	"Waterfall"	Schmidt		3:04
9.	"Charlie Brown Medley"	Vince Guaraldi	van der Beek, Schmidt, Nelson	3:04
10.	"Me and My Cello (Happy Together)"	Garry Bonner, Alan Lee Gordon	Nelson, van der Beek	3:06
11.	"Twinkle Lullaby"	Traditional	van der Beek, Schmidt, Nelson	1:51
12.	"More Than Words"			3:56
13.	"Can't Help Falling in Love"			4:15
14.	"Begin Again" (featuring Megan Nicole and Alex Goot)			4:09
Total length:				54:25

International Version (iTunes Bonus Tracks)
No.	Title	Arranger(s)	Length
15.	"Rock Meets Rachmaninoff"	Jon Schmidt, Chris Wormer, Joel Stevenett & Jake Bowen	3:25
Total length:			57:50

== Personnel ==
Per liner notes

The Piano Guys

- Steven Sharp Nelson - Cellist/Songwriter
- Jon Schmidt - Pianist/Songwriter
- Al van der Beek - Music Producer/Songwriter
- Paul Anderson - Video Producer/Videographer

Additional musicians

- Lindsey Stirling - violin on "Mission Impossible"

== Charts ==
=== Weekly charts ===
Chart (2013)	Peak position
German Albums Chart	97
US Billboard 200	38
US Billboard Classical Albums	1
US Billboard New Age Albums	1

=== Year-end charts ===
Chart (2013)	Position
US Billboard Classical Albums	7
US Billboard New Age Albums	2
Chart (2014)	Position
US Billboard Classical Albums	7
US Billboard New Age Albums	3
