= Wonders (album) =

Studio album by The Piano Guys
- Released: October 7, 2014
- Genre: Classical crossover
- Length: 47:46
- Label: Portrait
- Producers: Al van der Beek, Steven Sharp Nelson, Jon Schmidt

The Piano Guys chronology
A Family Christmas (2013)	Wonders (2014)	Uncharted (2016)

Wonders is the fifth studio album by American musical group The Piano Guys. It was released on October 7, 2014 by Portrait Records. The album reached number 12 on the US Billboard 200, making it their highest charting album to date.

The album also features the beginning of their "Wonders of the World" quest, beginning at the Great Wall of China for their video "Kung Fu Piano: Cello Ascends" and the "Christ the Redeemer" statue in Rio for their video "The Mission/ How Great Thou Art".

== Track listing ==
No.	Title	Writer(s)	Arranger(s)	Length
1.	"Story of My Life"	Julian Bunetta, Harry Styles, Niall Horan, Zayn Malik, Liam Payne, John Henry Ryan, Jamie Scott, Louis Tomlinson	Steven Sharp Nelson, Al van der Beek	4:34
2.	"Let It Go" ( (Note: Inspired by Concerto No. 4 in F Minor, Op. 8, RV 297, "L'inverno" (Winter) by Antonio Vivaldi))	Kristen Anderson, Robert Lopez, Antonio Vivaldi	van der Beek, Jon Schmidt, Nelson	4:05
3.	"Ants Marching /Ode to Joy" ( (Note: Inspired by the "Ode to Joy" melody from Symphony No. 9 in D minor, Op. 125 by Ludwig van Beethoven))	David Matthews, Ludwig van Beethoven	van der Beek, Schmidt, Nelson	2:52
4.	"Fathers' Eyes"	van der Beek, Nelson		4:00
5.	"Kung Fu Piano: Cello Ascends" ( (Note: Inspired by Prelude Op. 28, No. 20 in C Minor by Frédéric Chopin))	Henry Jackman, John Powell, Hans Zimmer, Frédéric Chopin	van der Beek, Schmidt, Nelson	4:05
6.	"Summer Jam"	Schmidt, Nelson		3:54
7.	"Batman Evolution"	Neal Hefti, Danny Elfman, James Newton Howard, Zimmer	van der Beek, Nelson	4:13
8.	"Don't You Worry Child" (featuring Shweta Subram)	Axel Hedfors, Sebastian Ingrosso, Steve Fragogiannis, Martin Lindström, Michel Zitron, Shweta Subram, Abhay Jodhpurkar	van der Beek, Nelson, Schmidt, Subram	4:05
9.	"Home"	Greg Holden, Drew Pearson	van der Beek, Schmidt, Nelson	4:41
10.	"The Mission / How Great Thou Art"	Ennio Morricone, Traditional	van der Beek, Schmidt, Nelson	3:11
11.	"Because of You"	van der Beek, Nelson		4:04
12.	"Pictures at an Exhibition" ( (Note: Based upon and inspired by "Promenade" from Pictures at an Exhibition by Modest Mussorgsky))	Modest Mussorgsky, van der Beek, Nelson	van der Beek, Nelson	4:02
Total length:				47:46

iTunes Bonus Track
No.	Title	Length
13.	"Love Story"	6:22

Target Exclusive Edition
No.	Title	Length
13.	"Without You"
14.	"What Are Words"

Special Asian Edition
No.	Title	Writer(s)	Arranger(s)	Length
1.	"What Makes You Beautiful"	Carl Falk, Savan Kotecha, Rami Yacoub	van der Beek, Schmidt, Nelson	2:53
2.	"Just the Way You Are"	Philip Lawrence, Bruno Mars, Khari Cain, Ari Levine, Khalil Walton	van der Beek, Schmidt, Nelson	4:21
3.	"Titanium / Pavane" ( (Note: Inspired by Fauré: Pavane))	Sia Furler, David Guetta, Giorgio Tuinfort, Nick Van De Wall, Gabriel Fauré	Al van der Beek, Jon Schmidt, Steven Sharp Nelson	4:50
4.	"A Thousand Years"	David Hodges, Christina Perri	van der Beek, Schmidt, Nelson	4:36
5.	"Rolling in the Deep" ( (Note: Includes melody from Gustav Holst's "Jupiter" from The Planets Suite))	Adele Laurie Blue Adkins, Paul Epworth	Nelson, Schmidt, van der Beek	3:52
6.	"Beethoven's 5 Secrets" ( (Note: Inspired by Beethoven: Symphony No. 5))	Ryan B. Tedder, Ludwig van Beethoven	Nelson, van der Beek, Kayson Brown	5:09
7.	"All of Me"	Schmidt		3:02
8.	"Waterfall"	Schmidt		3:04

== Personnel ==
Per liner notes

The Piano Guys

- Steven Sharp Nelson – cello, percussion, additional piano and vocals
- Jon Schmidt – piano, additional percussion and vocals
- Al van der Beek – percussion, vocals, additional piano

Additional musicians

- Shweta Subram – lead vocals on "Don't You Worry Child"
- Jake Bowen – percussion on "Summer Jam"
- Gigi Romney – additional percussion on "Kung Fu Piano: Cello Ascends"

== Charts ==
=== Weekly charts ===
Chart (2014)	Peak position
Australian Albums (ARIA)	88
Belgian Albums (Ultratop Wallonia)	156
German Albums (Offizielle Top 100)	86
Swiss Albums (Schweizer Hitparade)	46
UK Albums (Official Charts)	99
US Billboard 200	12
US Top Classical Albums (Billboard)	1
US Top New Age Albums (Billboard)	1

=== Year-end charts ===
Chart (2014)	Position
US Top Classical Albums (Billboard)	10
US Top New Age Albums (Billboard)	5
