= Christmas Together =

Christmas Together may refer to:

- Christmas Together (Garth Brooks and Trisha Yearwood album), a 2016 album by Garth Brooks and Trisha Yearwood
- Christmas Together, a 2017 album by The Tenors
- Christmas Together (The Piano Guys album), a 2017 album by The Piano Guys

== See also ==
- John Denver and the Muppets: A Christmas Together, a 1979 Christmas television special starring Jim Henson's Muppets and singer/songwriter John Denver
