= A Family Christmas (The Piano Guys album) =

Studio album by The Piano Guys
- Released: October 22, 2013
- Genre: Classical crossover
- Length: 47:00
- Label: Portrait
- Producers: Al van der Beek, Steven Sharp Nelson, Jon Schmidt

The Piano Guys chronology
The Piano Guys 2 (2013)	A Family Christmas (2013)	Wonders (2014)

A Family Christmas is the fourth studio album by American musical group The Piano Guys. Released on October 22, 2013 by Portrait (a division of Sony Masterworks), the album reached number 20 on the US Billboard 200. On October 7, 2014 the album was re-released with two additional tracks in two different limited edition versions, one containing a miniature piano Christmas ornament, and the other a miniature cello Christmas ornament.

== Track listing ==
No.	Title	Writer(s)	Length
1.	"Angels We Have Heard on High"	Traditional	3:35
2.	"O Come, O Come Emmanuel"	Traditional	5:04
3.	"Good King Wenceslas"	Traditional	3:54
4.	"Carol of the Bells/God Rest Ye Merry Gentlemen"	Al van der Beek, Various Composers, Steven Sharp Nelson	3:24
5.	"Where Are You Christmas?"	Mariah Carey, James Horner, Will Jennings	3:58
6.	"Let It Snow/Winter Wonderland"	Al van der Beek, Various Composers, Steven Sharp Nelson	3:31
7.	"Still, Still, Still"	Traditional	5:02
8.	"We Three Kings"	John Henry Hopkins Jr.	3:18
9.	"Away in a Manger"	William James Kirkpatrick	3:13
10.	"Christmas Morning"	Jon Schmidt	4:02
11.	"Winter Wind"	Steven Sharp Nelson, Jon Schmidt	4:29
12.	"Silent Night"	Franz Xaver Gruber	3:30
Total length:			47:00

Target Exclusive
No.	Title	Length
13.	"I Saw Three Ships"
14.	"Lo, How A Rose E'er Blooming"
15.	"North Pole Express (Ding Dong Merrily on High)"
16.	"In The Bleak Midwinter"

CD & Piano / CD & Cello Ornament Package
No.	Title	Length
13.	"It Came Upon A Midnight Clear"
14.	"Simple Gifts"

== Personnel ==
The Piano Guys

- Steven Sharp Nelson - Cellist/Songwriter
- Jon Schmidt - Pianist/Songwriter
- Al van der Beek - Music Producer/Songwriter
- Paul Anderson - Video Producer/Videographer

== Charts ==
=== Weekly charts ===
Chart (2013)	Peak position
US Billboard 200	20
US Billboard Classical Albums	1
US Billboard Holiday Albums	2
US Billboard New Age Albums	1

=== Year-end charts ===
Chart (2013)	Position
US Billboard Classical Albums	23
US Billboard New Age Albums	5
Chart (2014)	Position
US Billboard 200	162
US Billboard Classical Albums	2
US Billboard New Age Albums	1
