= Jon Schmidt =

American pianist

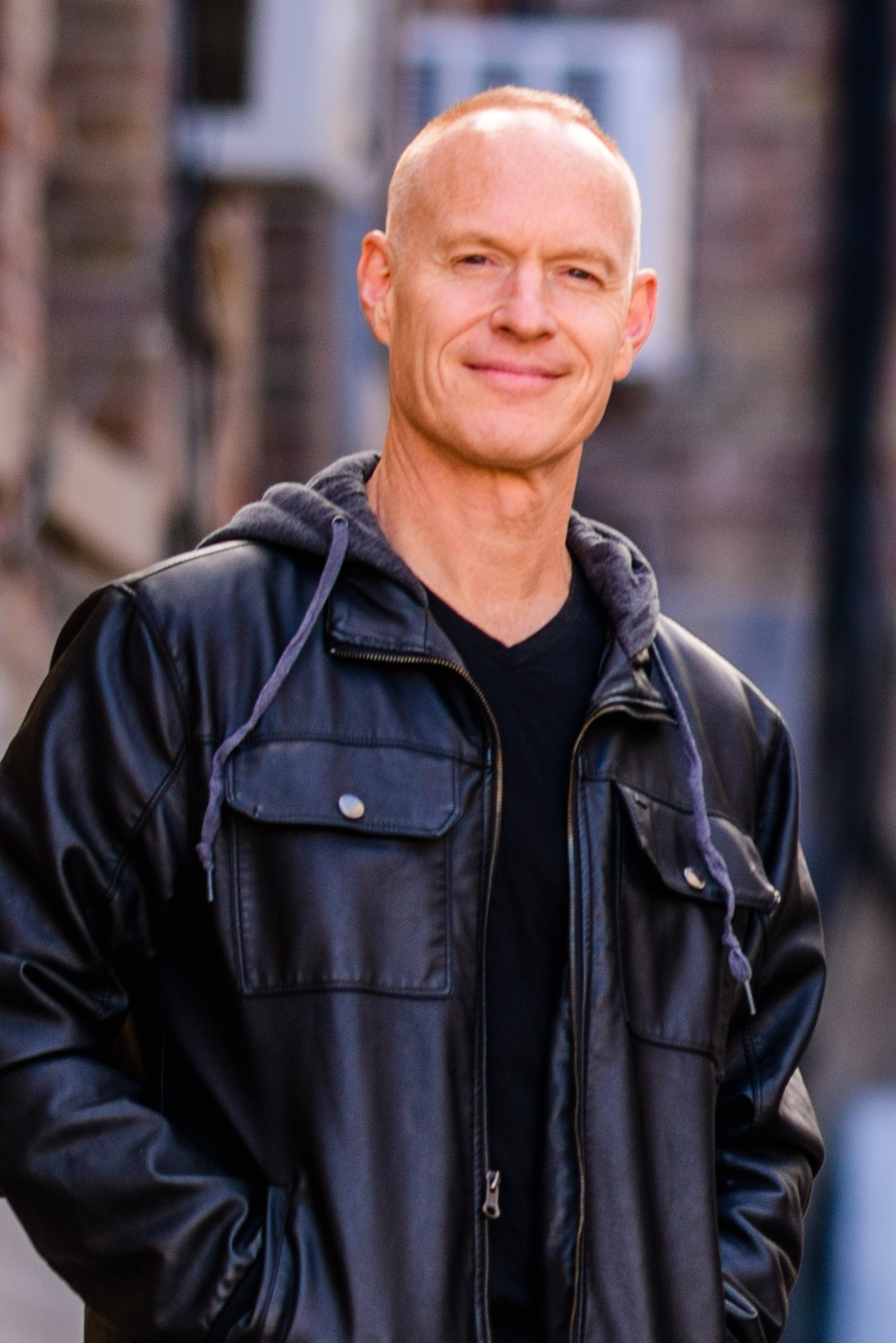

Background information
- Born: July 10, 1966 (age 60); Salt Lake City, Utah, U.S.
- Genres: New Age, classical crossover
- Instrument: Piano
- Member of: The Piano Guys
- Website: www.jonschmidt.com

Jon Schmidt (born 1966) is an American pianist and composer. Classically trained, he branched into New Age music in his 20s and has developed a classical crossover style that blends classical, contemporary, and rock and roll. He has released eight solo albums and seven piano books containing original scores. Since 2010 he has been a member of The Piano Guys musical group, performing on their YouTube videos, albums, and in concert.

== Early life and education ==
Jon Schmidt was born in Salt Lake City, Utah, to German immigrants. Both his paternal and maternal grandparents became members of the Church of Jesus Christ of Latter-day Saints (LDS Church) in Germany, and he is also a member of the church.

Schmidt was exposed to classical music at a young age. His father was an operatic tenor. His older sister, Rose-Anne, a virtuoso pianist, provided his classical training. Schmidt began appearing in piano recitals at the age of 8, was composing music by the age of 11, and started teaching piano at age 16. However, he did not perform publicly until college. As a student at Highland High School, he frequently played the piano at school assemblies and concerts. After graduation, he served on a mission to Norway, where he was known as the "mission piano player".

Schmidt was offered a music scholarship to the University of Utah, but decided to major in English instead. As he progressed in his undergraduate studies, he began thinking about pursuing a graduate degree in business administration. His career plans changed as he began performing in public.

== Musical career ==
My whole goal is to have a good time. I can't take my music or myself too seriously. That's the problem sometimes with classical performers is they take themselves too seriously. I consider myself a rock pianist.

— Jon Schmidt, 2010

Schmidt initially played at benefit concerts and recorded his music for sale on cassette tape. He then decided to promote himself by booking himself into large venues such as the Highland High School auditorium, which he filled with an audience of 1,000, and Kingsbury Hall, the largest performance venue in Salt Lake City, which he also sold out.

He released his first album, August End, in 1991. After that he signed with Aubergine Records and released A Walk in the Woods (1993), A Day in the Sunset (1994), and Jon Schmidt Christmas (1995). In 2000 he released To the Summit under his own label, JSP Productions.

By 2010 Schmidt was giving 100 concerts a year in the Wasatch Front metropolitan area of Utah, as well as in Arizona, Southern California, Idaho, and Washington state.

Schmidt has published seven piano books containing original scores. He has developed a "Ten Week Note-Reading Method" for adults and children.

== The Piano Guys ==
Schmidt became a member of The Piano Guys in 2010. The group and its music video concept originated as the social media marketing strategy of Paul Anderson, owner of The Piano Guys piano store in St. George, Utah. Anderson knew Schmidt from the latter's visits to the store; Schmidt enjoyed practicing on the pianos in the showroom whenever he came to town. In 2009 Anderson saw a music video that Schmidt had uploaded to YouTube, "Love Story Meets Viva la Vida" – blending the Taylor Swift country pop "Love Story" with Coldplay's Baroque pop "Viva la Vida", which Schmidt performed as a duet with cellist Steven Sharp Nelson. The video collected over one million hits. Anderson suggested that he produce professional videos of the musicians performing and upload them to his store's YouTube channel. Nelson brought his neighbor Al van der Beek, a songwriter and music arranger, onto the project, and Tel Stewart assisted with video production.

After producing a number of videos that failed to garner much interest, the group posted "Michael Meets Mozart" (2011), and Schmidt invited the nearly 30,000 people on his fan mailing list "to watch it and share it". Views took off beyond the region. The group continued to upload new videos for the next two years, gaining thousands of fans each time. The group signed with Sony Masterworks in 2012 and went on to release seven number-one albums. As of February 2024, the group has surpassed 2.3 billion views on their YouTube channel and have 7.09 million subscribers.

== Musical style ==
Schmidt blends classical, pop, and rock and roll in his compositions. He cites Beethoven, Mannheim Steamroller, Billy Joel, and Dave Grusin as musical influences. He also demonstrates a flair for the theatrical in his live solo performances, such as "playing an entire song while upside down, putting on a funky wig, playing with his toes and beat boxing".

== Personal life ==
Schmidt and his wife Michelle have five children and reside in St. George, Utah. In October 2016 their 21-year-old daughter Annie disappeared while hiking in Oregon. Her body was found the following month at the base of a cliff in the Columbia River Gorge; her death was ruled accidental.Michelle passed away on October 17,2026 after a long battle with cancer.

== Discography ==
=== Solo albums ===
- August End (1991)
- Walk in the Woods (1993)
- A Day in the Sunset (1994)
- Jon Schmidt Christmas (1995)
- To the Summit (2000)
- Winter Serenade (2004)
- Hymns Without Words (2006)
- Piano Portraits Lullaby (2009)
- Bonus Tracks (2009)

=== Guest appearances ===
- Piano Portraits (2002) – solo performances by Schmidt, Paul Cardall, Michael R. Hicks, and David Tolk
- Pure Touch: Vol. 1 (2008) – with Matt Bachrach and Craig Linder

=== The Piano Guys ===
- Hits Volume 1 (2011)
- The Piano Guys (2012)
- The Piano Guys 2 (2013)
- A Family Christmas (2013)
- Wonders (2014)
- Live!: Carnegie Hall Audio + Red Rocks Concert Video (2015)
- Uncharted (2016)
- Christmas Together (2017)
- Limitless (2018)
- 10 (2020)
- Chill (2021)
- Lullaby (2021)
- Unstoppable (2023)
- Pop on Piano (2026)

== Piano books ==
- 67 Fun Songs: Arrangements for Easy Piano Songbook. 2003.
- New Age Classical Piano Solos. Aubergine Records. 1996.
- New Age Classical Piano Solos. Vol. II. Aubergine Records.
- New Age Classical Piano Solos. Vol. III (Revised ed.).
- New Age Classical Piano Solos. Vol. IV (Revised ed.).
