= The Piano Guys (album) =

Studio album by The Piano Guys
- Released: October 2, 2012
- Recorded: 2011–12; Draper, Utah (TPG Studios); Sandy, Utah (Big Idea Studios); Salt Lake City, Utah (MetCom Studios)
- Genre: Classical crossover
- Length: 52:51
- Label: Portrait, Sony Masterworks
- Producer: Al van der Beek, Steven Sharp Nelson, Jon Schmidt

The Piano Guys chronology
Hits Volume 1 (2011)	The Piano Guys (2012)	The Piano Guys 2 (2013)

The Piano Guys is the second studio album, and first on a major record label, by American musical group The Piano Guys. It was released on October 2, 2012 through Sony Masterworks. The album is composed primarily of covers and mashups of classical and popular music.

== Track listing ==
No.	Title	Writer(s)	Arranger(s)	Length
1.	"Titanium / Pavane" ( (Note: Inspired by Fauré: Pavane))	Sia Furler, David Guetta, Giorgio Tuinfort, Nick Van De Wall, Gabriel Fauré	Al van der Beek, Jon Schmidt, Steven Sharp Nelson	4:50
2.	"Peponi (Paradise)"	Guy Berryman, Jonathon Buckland, William Champion, Brian Eno, Chris Martin, Alex Boyé (Note: Swahili lyrics by Alex Boyé)	van der Beek, Boyé, Nelson	4:10
3.	"Code Name Vivaldi" ( (Note: Inspired by Vivaldi: Double Concerto in G Minor, RV 531))	John James Powell, Antonio Vivaldi	van der Beek, Schmidt, Nelson	4:06
4.	"Beethoven's 5 Secrets" ( (Note: Inspired by Beethoven: Symphony No. 5))	Ryan B. Tedder, Ludwig van Beethoven	Nelson, van der Beek, Kayson Brown	5:09
5.	"Over the Rainbow / Simple Gifts" ( (Note: Inspired by Brackett: Simple Gifts))	Harold Arlen, Joseph Brackett	van der Beek, Schmidt, Nelson	3:44
6.	"Cello Wars"	John Williams	van der Beek, Nelson	3:31
7.	"Arwen's Vigil"	van der Beek, Schmidt, Nelson		3:55
8.	"Moonlight" ( (Note: Inspired by Beethoven: "Moonlight" Sonata and Beethoven: Symphony No. 7, Second movement))	Nelson, van der Beek, Beethoven	van der Beek, Nelson	3:28
9.	"A Thousand Years"	David Hodges, Christina Perri	van der Beek, Schmidt, Nelson	4:36
10.	"Michael Meets Mozart"	van der Beek, Schmidt, Nelson		5:20
11.	"The Cello Song" ( (Note: Inspired by Bach: Unaccompanied Cello Suite No. 1, Prelude))	Johann Sebastian Bach, Nelson, van der Beek	van der Beek, Nelson	3:16
12.	"Rolling in the Deep" ( (Note: Contains elements of The Planets "Jupiter Theme" by Gustav Holst; Inspired by Holst: The Planets "Jupiter Theme"))	Adele Adkins, Paul Epworth	van der Beek, Schmidt, Nelson	3:52
13.	"What Makes You Beautiful"	Carl Falk, Savan Kotecha, Rami Yacoub	van der Beek, Schmidt, Nelson	2:54
Total length:				52:51

International Version
No.	Title	Length
14.	"Bring Him Home"	4:15
15.	"Without You"	3:36
16.	"Nearer My God to Thee"	3:01

== Personnel ==
Per liner notes

The Piano Guys

- Steven Sharp Nelson - producer, electric, acoustic and steel cellos, piano and cello percussion, light saber on "Cello Wars", additional percussion, piano and vocals
- Jon Schmidt - piano, piano and vocal percussion, additional vocals and production
- Al van der Beek - producer, percussion, additional piano, piano percussion and vocals
- Tel Stewart - videography
- Paul Anderson - videography, editing

Additional musicians

- Alex Boyé - lead vocals on "Peponi (Paradise)"
- Julie Ann Nelson - additional vocals on "Beethoven's 5 Secrets"
- Matthew John Nelson - additional vocals on "Beethoven's 5 Secrets"
- Lyceum Philharmonic Orchestra - orchestration on "Beethoven's 5 Secrets"
- Kayson Brown - conducting on "Beethoven's 5 Secrets"

== Commercial performance ==
As of June 2013, the album had sold more than 135,000 copies in the United States.

== Charts ==
=== Weekly charts ===
Chart (2012–13)	Peak position
Austrian Albums Chart	65
German Albums Chart	51
US Billboard 200	44
US Billboard Classical Albums	1
US Billboard New Age Albums	1

=== Year-end charts ===
Chart (2012)	Position
US Billboard Classical Albums	16
US Billboard New Age Albums	6
Chart (2013)	Position
US Billboard Classical Albums	3
US Billboard New Age Albums	1
Chart (2014)	Position
US Billboard Classical Albums	8
US Billboard New Age Albums	4

== Certifications and sales ==
Region	Certification	Certified units/sales
Mexico (AMPROFON)	Gold	30,000^{^}
Singapore (RIAS)	Gold	5,000^{*}
United Kingdom (BPI)	Silver	60,000^{‡}
United States (RIAA)	Gold	500,000^{‡}
^{*} Sales figures based on certification alone.^{^} Shipments figures based on certification alone.^{‡} Sales+streaming figures based on certification alone.

== Release history ==
Region	Date	Format	Label
United States	October 2, 2012	CD, Digital download	Sony Masterworks
Canada	October 23, 2012	CD, Digital download	Sony Masterworks
Europe	January 18, 2013	CD, Digital download	Sony Masterworks
