= Paul Cardall =

American pianist and composer

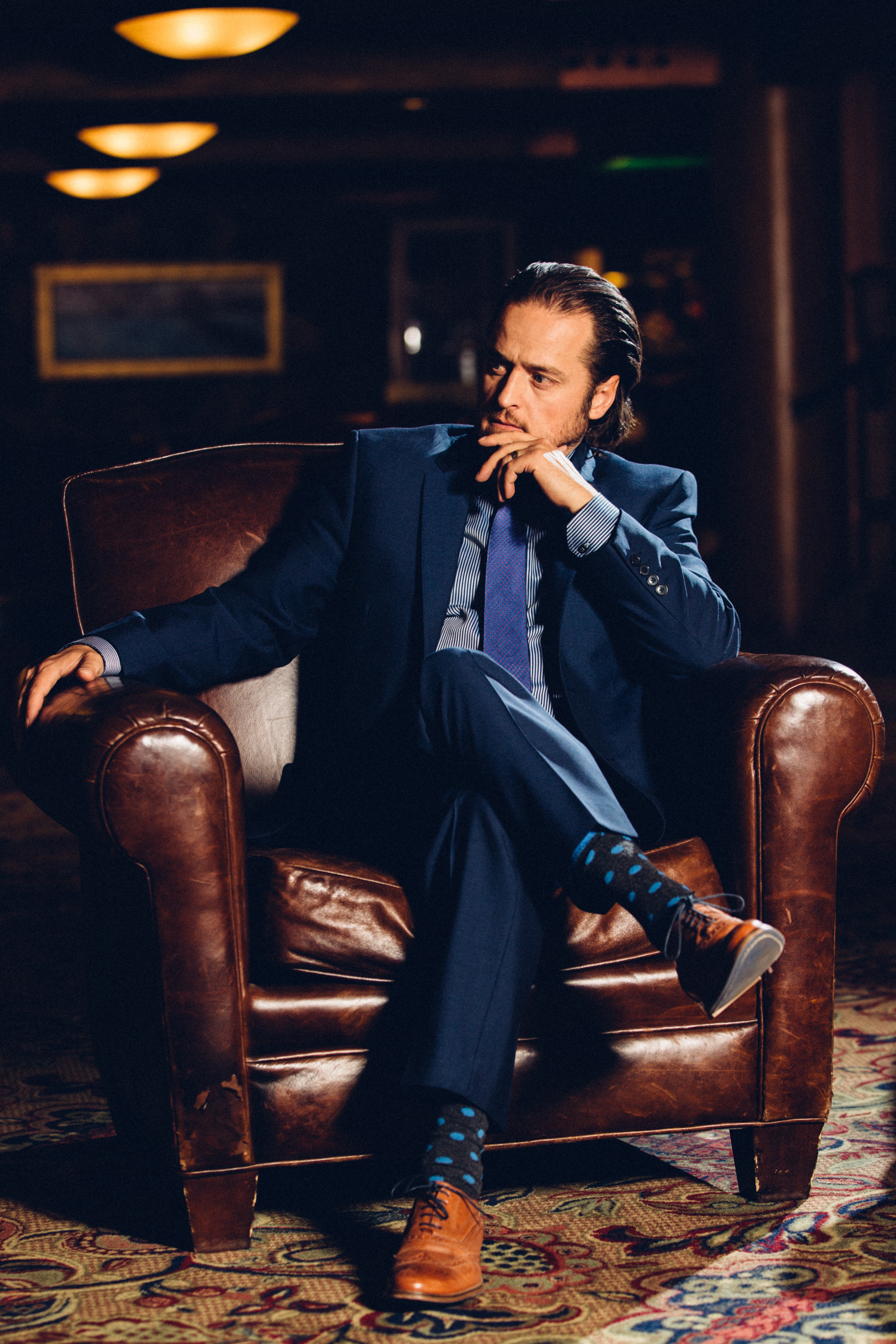
- Cardall in 2016

Background information
- Born: April 24, 1973 (age 53); Salt Lake City, Utah, U.S.
- Origin: Utah, U.S.
- Genres: New age, classical, Christian, instrumental
- Occupations: Pianist, composer, record producer, label founder
- Instruments: Piano, keyboards, programming
- Years active: 1994–present
- Labels: Narada Productions, Stone Angel Music, Anthem Entertainment Group, All Heart Publishing
- Spouses: Lynnette Stewart (divorced); Kristina Cardall
- Website: paulcardall.com

Paul Cardall (born April 24, 1973) is an American pianist, composer, and record producer known for his original piano compositions and arrangements of hymns. His music is frequently categorized as classical, Christian, and new age. Cardall has had several recordings debut at No. 1 on Billboard charts.

In addition to his recording career, Cardall founded Stone Angel Music in 1999, which produced a catalogue of recordings by other similar artists. The catalogue was acquired by Anthem Entertainment Group in 2018.

== Early life ==
Cardall was born with a single functioning ventricle and required surgery the day he was born. After two additional heart surgeries during his youth, Cardall became a pianist.

Cardall served as Fine Arts President and Public Relations Vice-president at Salt Lake Community College while funded by a leadership scholarship. During the summer season, he worked as a youth counselor for the Especially for Youth camps at Brigham Young University. While attending college, Cardall played piano for tips at a Nordstrom department store and local restaurants. He recorded his first album, Sign of Affection, in 1994. Richard Paul Evans, author of The Christmas Box, heard the album and asked Cardall to create a musical adaptation of his story. Through touring and book signings with Evans, Cardall developed a national audience and independent fan base.

While continuing to compose music part-time, Cardall worked at Richard Paul Evans' book distribution company as a music executive. He worked with Disney, BMG, and other companies before pursuing music full time. Cardall's early compositions were influenced by Mozart, David Lanz, George Winston, and Yanni.

== Career ==
In early 1999, Cardall founded Stone Angel Music, an independent record label intended to produce, market, and distribute his recordings. That same year, Cardall signed a multi-album deal with Narada Productions, an affiliate of Virgin Records. Narada expanded upon the distribution channels Cardall had started with author Richard Paul Evans. The Christmas Box album debuted at No. 22 on Billboard's New Age Chart. That same year, Cardall released The Looking Glass. In December 1999, both records were listed on Billboard's Top 25 New Age Charts.

During his association with The Christmas Box, families of victims in the Oklahoma City bombing requested the music be played during memorial ceremonies as flowers were placed on the empty chairs representing the victims. Inspired by the event, Cardall released Miracles: A Journey of Hope and Healing.

In September 2005, Cardall released Primary Worship. The album debuted at No. 12 on Billboard's Top New Age Albums chart and remained on the chart for 11 weeks. In 2008, Cardall released The Hymns Collection, which debuted at No. 4 on Billboard's New Age chart. That same year, he released the two-disc album Living for Eden. In 2009, Cardall released Sacred Piano, which debuted at No. 5 on Billboard's New Age chart.

In February 2011, Cardall's album New Life debuted at No. 1 on Billboard's New Age chart. New Life remained in the top five for more than 30 weeks.

The release followed Cardall's heart transplant surgery in 2009 after living with congenital heart disease. His recovery and return to performing received regional and national media coverage.

In 2013, Cardall composed the score for T.C. Christensen's film Ephraim's Rescue, about Mormon pioneers stranded in the snow in 1856. The score received the 2014 Best Music Score for a Feature Film award at the Filmed in Utah Awards.

Cardall's album 40 Hymns for Forty Days was released in 2015 and debuted at No. 1 on Billboard's New Age chart. The album remained in Billboard's New Age top 10 for more than 50 weeks.

Cardall's A New Creation was released on September 16, 2016, by Stone Angel Music. The album debuted at No. 1 on Billboard's New Age Albums chart, No. 2 on the Classical Albums chart, No. 12 on the Christian Albums chart, No. 34 on the Independent Albums chart, and No. 7 on the Heatseekers chart. The album featured collaborations with Nathan Pacheco and Patrice Tipoki.

In 2018, Cardall produced Worth of Souls, a collaborative Christian music project intended to address suicide awareness and depression. The album debuted at No. 12 on Billboard's Compilation Albums chart and No. 20 on the Christian Albums Sales chart. That same year, Cardall produced Sunday, a collection of recordings from various Stone Angel Music artists. The album debuted at No. 1 on Billboard's New Age Albums chart and No. 35 on the Christian Albums Sales chart.

Anthem Entertainment acquired Cardall's catalog and the Stone Angel Music catalog in 2018. On November 2, 2018, Cardall released Christmas. The album was produced by Jim Daneker and recorded at Ocean Way Nashville. It featured collaborations with CeCe Winans. Christmas debuted at No. 1 on Billboard's New Age chart and No. 2 on the Classical chart. In 2019, the album received the Dove Award for Instrumental Album of the Year.

In August 2019, Cardall released Peaceful Piano through Anthem Entertainment. The album marked the 10th anniversary of his heart transplant and featured improvised piano recordings reflecting on his recovery and survival. Cardall worked with Grammy-winning engineer Michael Bishop on the project.

Cardall participated in Ty Herndon's 2020 recording of Orphans of God alongside Kristin Chenoweth.

In February 2021, Cardall released The Broken Miracle through Anthem Entertainment Group. The album included collaborations with David Archuleta, Tyler Glenn, Thompson Square, Ty Herndon, Matt Hammitt, and Rachael Yamagata.

In August 2021, Cardall's recording contract with Anthem Entertainment ended and he established the independent label All Heart Publishing. Symphonic Distribution became the distributor for All Heart Publishing.

Cardall's first release under the label was December in 2021. The album debuted at No. 11 on Billboard's Classical Crossover chart. Cardall released two versions of the project: one featuring piano with string ensemble arrangements and another featuring solo piano.

In 2022, Cardall released Sleep, a collection of compositions designed around various phases of the sleep cycle.

Cardall released Return Home on September 8, 2023. A solo piano version, Return Home: Solo Piano Version, followed in 2024.

In 2024, Cardall released five singles leading up to the release of Grace in Grief. The album reflected on grief, healing, and the 15th anniversary of his heart transplant.

In 2025, Cardall released Ascensus, a classical and new-age concept album centered on the composition Ascensus Christi: A Piano Rhapsody. The rhapsody, released as a lead single on April 4, 2025, debuted at No. 1 on iTopChart's Classical chart and was inspired by the biblical account of Christ's ascension.

The full album, released on May 23, 2025, featured 11 variations built around the central composition, including orchestral, brass, bass, harp, violin, solo piano, remix, and accompaniment arrangements. The project included collaborations with Gideon Klein for string arrangements and Tyler Michael Smith for orchestration.

Following Ascensus, Cardall released several projects under All Heart Publishing. In 2026, he released Chasing Crowns, an electronic concept album blending piano, ambient music, and electronic elements. That same year, he released Ancestors, a piano-led concept album exploring themes of heritage, memory, and emotional resilience. Cardall also released 40 Hymns for Guitar, an instrumental hymn collection centered on acoustic guitar arrangements.

Cardall additionally launched two side projects under All Heart Publishing. The first, Winterfield, is an indie folk and storytelling project blending acoustic instrumentation with lyrics focused on faith, memory, and identity. Releases under the project include The Moth and the full-length album Wayfaring Christian in 2026.

The second project, Royal Refuge, was introduced as a Christian music collective centered on themes of healing, encouragement, and faith. Releases under the collective include the single Your Presence and the album Unbound in 2026.

=== Performances and public appearances ===
Cardall has performed at concerts and public events connected to music, humanitarian causes, and heart-transplant awareness. Following his 2009 heart transplant surgery, he publicly discussed his recovery and return to performing in interviews and media appearances.

In 2010, Cardall performed from the summit of Mount Olympus in Utah in memory of his brother and organ donor.

Cardall later performed at the White House during the administration of President Donald Trump as part of an event recognizing music and humanitarian outreach.

In 2015, Cardall again reached No. 1 on Billboard's New Age chart with 40 Hymns for Forty Days.

In 2016, Cardall and singer David Archuleta performed at a humanitarian concert in Slovenia connected to refugee relief efforts.

In 2018, Cardall performed at the Hyde Park Chapel in London.

In 2018, Cardall performed at the White House Christmas Tree Lighting Ceremony during the administration of President Donald Trump.

Cardall's music and recovery story have additionally been profiled by publications including The Salt Lake Tribune, Mix Magazine, the American Heart Association, and CCM Magazine.

== Stone Angel Music ==
Stone Angel Music is an independent record label founded by Cardall in 1999.

Stone Angel Music has also released albums by Steven Sharp Nelson from The Piano Guys, Camille Nelson, Ryan Tilby, Shane Mickelsen, and Jason Lyle Black, whose album Piano Preludes debuted at No. 2 on the Billboard Top New Age Albums Chart in 2016.

== Personal life ==
Cardall lived with congenital heart disease for over thirty years. In August 2008, Cardall was listed for a heart transplant. After waiting 385 days, he received a donated heart via transplant on September 9, 2009.

In February 2026, Cardall entered into full communion with the Catholic Church in Nashville, Tennessee.

Cardall served on the executive board for Saving Tiny Hearts, a nonprofit dedicated to funding research for congenital heart disease.

The Paul & Kristina Cardall Scholarship was established with help from Salt Lake Community College for students with congenital heart disease.

Cardall has performed at benefit concerts for individuals who require a heart transplant. In 2014, he performed in Salt Lake City for a child who suffered from heart illness.

In 2011, the Utah State Board of Regents awarded Cardall an honorary doctorate.

Cardall is married to Kristina Cardall, formerly Kristina Molek, a former Wall Street analyst who is a first-generation Slovenian American.
