= Jason Lyle Black =

American musician

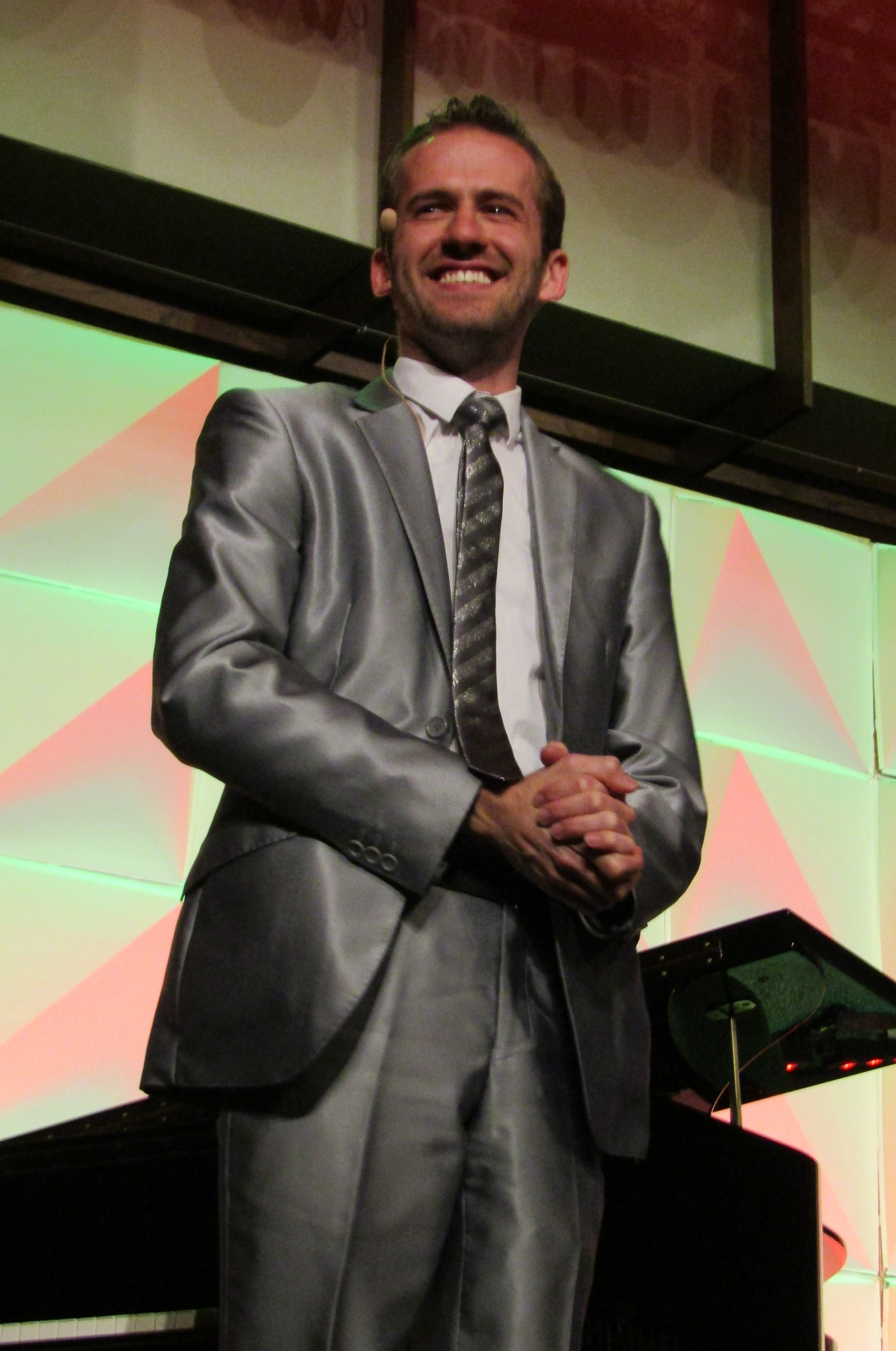
- Jason Lyle Black in 2018

Background information
- Born: Jason Lyle Black
- Genres: Classical, New Age
- Occupation(s): Pianist, composer
- Instrument: Piano
- Years active: 2010–present
- Labels: Stone Angel Music, Jason Lyle Black
- Website: www.jasonlyleblack.com

Jason Lyle Black is an American pianist, composer, and Billboard-charting artist.

== Biography ==
Black grew up in Livermore, California. He participated in the final round of the 73rd Scripps National Spelling Bee in 2000. Black started learning how to play the piano at age 8, and started playing it backwards at age 14. He went to college at Brigham Young University, where he played concerts and studied accounting. After graduating in 2012, he became a Certified Public Accountant, but then decided to focus his career on becoming a touring musician.

== Discography ==
In 2016, Black signed to Stone Angel Music, releasing album Piano Preludes in May, from producer Paul Cardall. The album featured the violinist Jenny Oaks Baker as a guest soloist. Piano Preludes debuted at #2 on the Billboard New Age chart, spending three weeks in the #2 spot. Music critic Kathy Parsons called the album "masterful", and Deseret News reporter Sydney Cobb called it "peaceful."

Black is also known for his viral videos based on songs from the movies Frozen and Up. and for his performance on The Ellen DeGeneres Show. Black has previously won the Utah Music Awards.

== Personal life ==
Black grew up in the Church of Jesus Christ of Latter-day Saints. Two of Black's grandparents are accomplished pianists. Black has been involved in serving the special needs community.
