= Steven Sharp Nelson =

American cellist (born 1977)

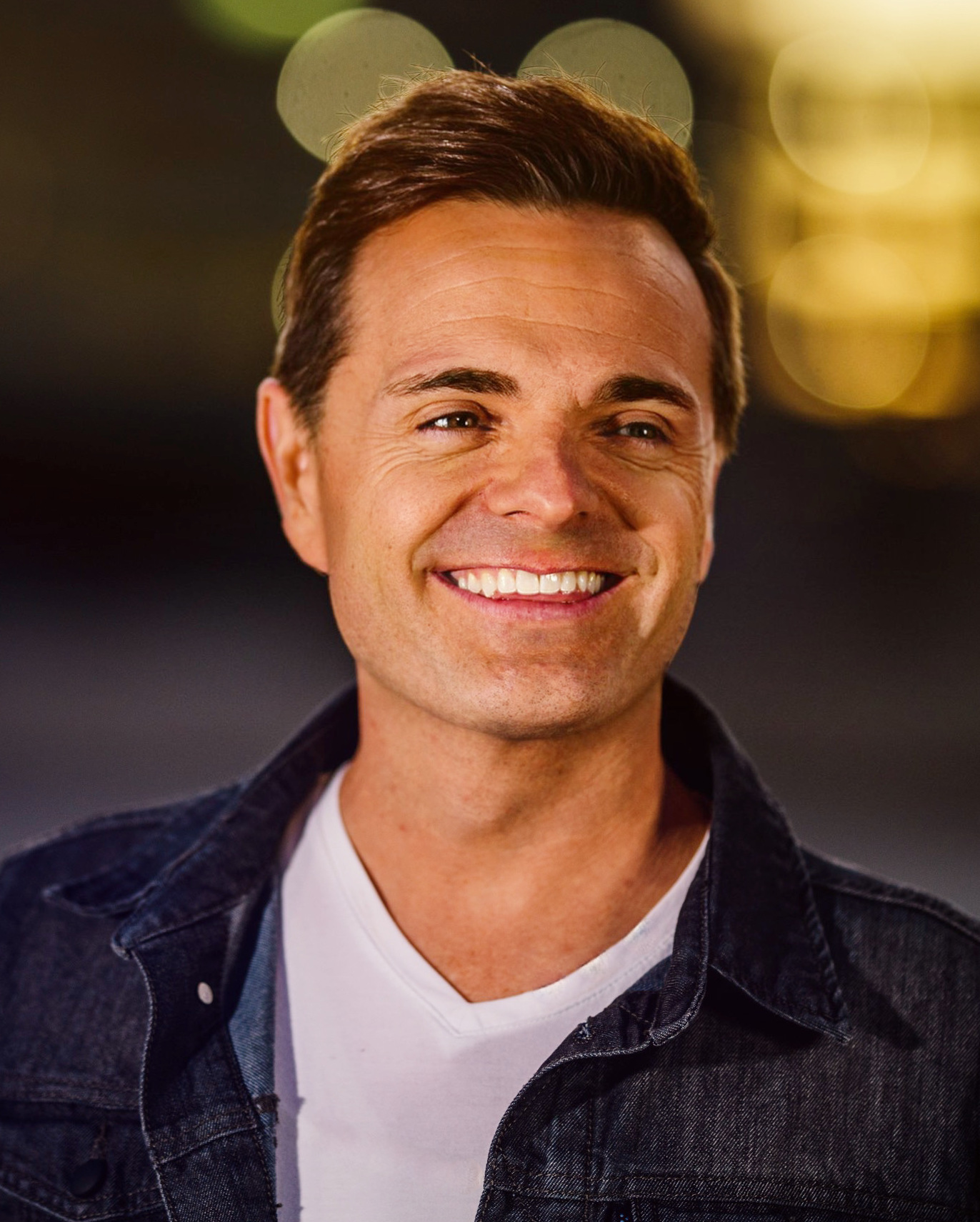
- Nelson in 2018

Background information
- Also known as: The Cello Guy
- Born: July 5, 1977 (age 49); Salt Lake City, Utah, U.S.
- Genres: Classical, new-age
- Occupations: Cellist, composer
- Instrument: Cello
- Years active: 2006–present
- Website: stevensharpnelson.com

Steven Sharp Nelson (born July 5, 1977) is an American cellist. He is best known as "The Cello Guy" of the classical new-age musical group The Piano Guys, with whom he has released eight number-one albums and dozens of music videos. He also has three solo albums to his credit. He is considered a pioneer in "cello-percussion", which enhances traditional cello playing with pizzicato and percussive techniques.

== Early life and education ==
Steven Sharp Nelson grew up in Salt Lake City, Utah, the son of John C. Nelson and Lynne Sanders. His mother was a former professional opera singer, and she died from a brain tumor on May 21, 1999, and his younger sister, Camille Nelson, is a folk musician. When he was seven, Nelson's father decided that each of his children would learn to play an instrument invented before 1800. Nelson tried the violin but discovered a passion for the cello. He studied cello with teacher Kate Reeves and then with Ryan Selberg, the principal cellist for the Utah Symphony. Since his attention deficit hyperactivity disorder (ADHD) inhibited his attention span for long practice sessions, he began practicing on other instruments as well, including drums, guitar, and piano. This led to his developing creative ways to play the cello: "strumming it, banging it and using pizzicato much more aggressively – using my thumb, fist, fingernail and palm". He also began playing with different types of musical groups, including bands, orchestras, and string quartets.

Nelson earned his bachelor's degree in music from the University of Utah in 2002. In 2007 he earned a master's degree in public administration, as well as a graduate certificate in urban planning, from the same institution.

== Career ==
Nelson initially pursued a career as a real estate developer, becoming the owner of Thornton Walker Real Estate. In his spare time, he played cello to accompany local musicians both on stage and in the studio. By 2006, he had played on more than 100 locally produced music CDs. Among his musician partners were several pianists and a guitarist. In 2006 he described his music as "an escape, rather than a vocation", and didn't expect music to become his primary career.

In 1999 Nelson signed with Stone Angel Music, an independent record label in Salt Lake City founded by Paul Cardall. His first solo album, Sacred Cello (2006), entered the Billboard charts top 20 classical recordings and garnered a Pearl Award for Best Instrumental Classical Album. His other two solo albums are Tender Mercies (2008) and Christmas Cello (2010).

=== The Piano Guys ===
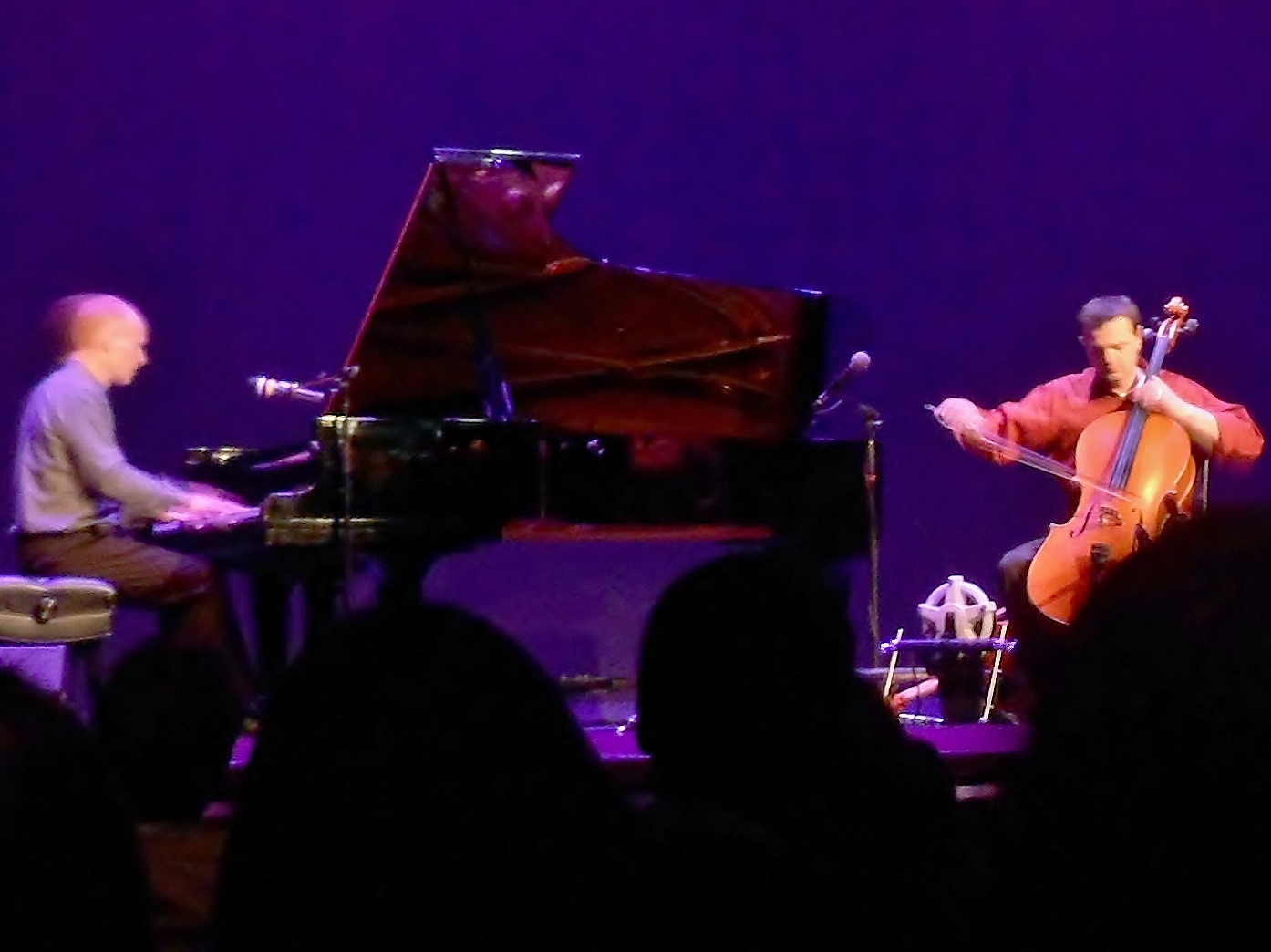
The Piano Guys' Jon Schmidt (left) and Nelson (right) perform live in 2002

Nelson became a member of The Piano Guys in 2011. The group was the brainchild of Paul Anderson, owner of The Piano Guys piano store in St. George, Utah, who sought an innovative way to promote his store via social media. In 2009 Anderson saw a YouTube music video that local musician Jon Schmidt had uploaded "for fun", featuring Schmidt on piano and Nelson on cello and kick drum performing a mashup called "Love Story Meets Viva la Vida", which combined the Taylor Swift country pop "Love Story" with Coldplay's Baroque pop "Viva la Vida". The video garnered over one million hits. Anderson hired the duo to perform on videos that he would professionally film in unusual locations and upload to his store's YouTube channel. Nelson brought in his neighbor, Al van der Beek, a songwriter and music arranger who had a home recording studio, to the project. Tel Stewart assisted with video production.

The Piano Guys gained their first widespread exposure with "Michael Meets Mozart" (2011), thanks to Schmidt's invitation to the nearly 30,000 people on his fan mailing list "to watch it and share it"; as a result, people began watching the videos beyond the region. The video featured Nelson playing 100 cello tracks to achieve the final effect. Nelson's video performances of "Cello Wars" (2011) and "Beethoven's 5 Secrets" (2012) debuted at number one on the YouTube charts.

The Piano Guys signed with Sony Masterworks in 2012. At that point they all quit their regular jobs to pursue their musical career. The group has released eight number-one albums. As of February 2024 they have surpassed 2.3 billion views on their YouTube channel and have 7.09 million subscribers. Their most popular video is a cover of Christina Perri's A Thousand Years, with over 223 million views.

== Musical style ==
Nelson performs a variety of musical styles, including classical, folk, new age, and inspirational. He is considered a pioneer in "cello-percussion", which enhances traditional cello playing with pizzicato and percussive techniques. He owns 41 cellos, which he says produce different sounds and have different "personalities". He also plays kick drum.

He credits his influences as Yo-Yo Ma, Bobby McFerrin, and Victor Borge.

== Personal life ==
Nelson is a member of the Church of Jesus Christ of Latter-day Saints. As part of his faith, Nelson served a mission to South Korea. He considers his art and his touring as a means to spread the gospel; he says that he also gives away a copy of the Book of Mormon to someone on nearly every tour. He and the other members of The Piano Guys, all LDS, pray together before each concert, recording session, and video shoot.

Nelson and his wife, Julie, have four children and reside in Salt Lake City. In 2017, he performed a duet together with his daughter Lucy, who sang, in the One Voice Children's Choir's music video of "Only Hope". In 2018 he performed with his wife, who played violin, in a cover of "Rewrite the Stars".

== Discography ==
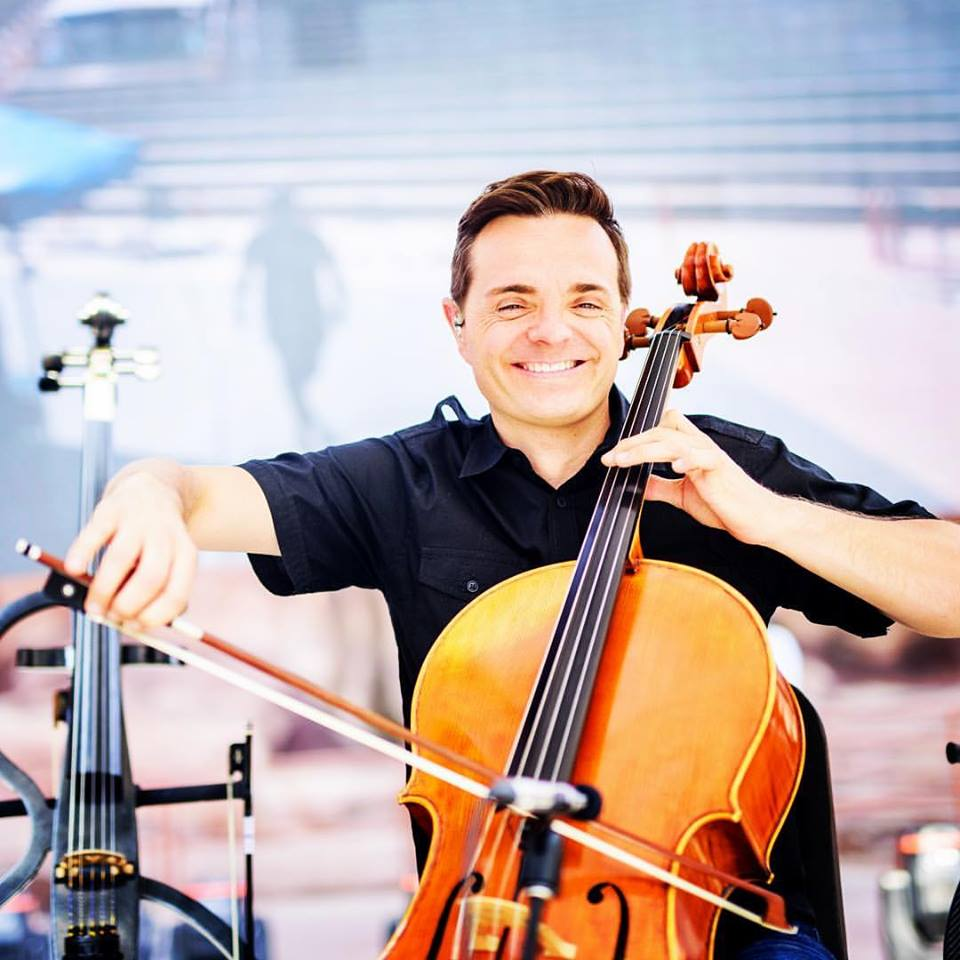

=== Solo albums ===
- Sacred Cello (2006)
- Tender Mercies (2008)
- Christmas Cello (2010)
- Grace (2014)

=== The Piano Guys ===
- Hits Volume 1 (2011)
- The Piano Guys (2012)
- The Piano Guys 2 (2013)
- A Family Christmas (2013)
- Wonders (2014)
- Live!: Carnegie Hall Audio + Red Rocks Concert Video (2015)
- Uncharted (2016)
- Christmas Together (2017)
- Limitless (2018)
