= Uncharted (album) =

Studio album by The Piano Guys
- Released: October 28, 2016
- Recorded: 2015–16
- Genre: Classical crossover
- Length: 45:22
- Label: Portrait
- Producer: Al van der Beek, Steven Sharp Nelson, Jon Schmidt

The Piano Guys chronology
Wonders (2014)	Uncharted (2016)	Christmas Together (2017)

Uncharted is the sixth studio album by American music group The Piano Guys. It was released on October 28, 2016, by Portrait Records. The album reached number 15 on the US Billboard 200, making it their second highest-charting album to date.

The album features their first vocal single, "(It's Gonna be) Okay". The songs "The Jungle Book/ Sarabande", filmed at Chichén Itzá, and "Indiana Jones and the Arabian Nights", filmed at Petra, are the continuation of their "Wonders of the World" quest.

The deluxe version of Uncharted comes with a DVD featuring 9 music videos and behind the scenes content.

== Track listing ==
No.	Title	Writer(s)	Arranger(s)	Length
1.	"Fight Song / Amazing Grace"	Rachel Platten, Dave Bassett, John Newton	Al van der Beek, Steven Sharp Nelson	4:04
2.	"A Sky Full of Stars"	Tim Bergling, Guy Berryman, Jonny Buckland, Will Champion, Chris Martin	Jon Schmidt, Nelson, Giles Reaves	4:08
3.	"Hello / Lacrimosa" ( (Note: Inspired by the "Lacrimosa" melody from Mozart's Requiem, K. 626))	Adele Adkins, Greg Kurstin	van der Beek, Nelson	3:51
4.	"(It's Gonna Be) Okay"	Andy Grammer, Dave Bassett	van der Beek, Nelson	3:30
5.	"Themes from The Pirates of the Caribbean"	Hans Zimmer, Klaus Badelt	van der Beek, Schmidt, Nelson, Zimmer	6:20
6.	"Celloopa"	van der Beek, Nelson		2:46
7.	"The Jungle Book / Sarabande" ( (Note: Inspired by the "Sarabande" melody from Handel's Keyboard suite in D minor (HWV 437)))	Robert Sherman, Richard Sherman, Terry Gilkyson, George Bruns, George Frideric Handel	van der Beek, Schmidt, Nelson	3:42
8.	"Holding On"	van der Beek, Schmidt, Nelson		3:26
9.	"Can't Stop the Feeling"	Justin Timberlake, Max Martin, Shellback	van der Beek, Schmidt, Nelson	3:02
10.	"Tour de France"	Schmidt		3:35
11.	"Uncharted"	van der Beek, Nelson		3:32
12.	"Indiana Jones and the Arabian Nights" ( (Note: Inspired by Rimsky-Korsakov's "Scheherazade", Op. 35))	John Williams, Nikolai Rimsky-Korsakov	van der Beek, Schmidt, Nelson	3:26
Total length:				45:22

Deluxe Edition (Disc 2: DVD)
No.	Title	Length
1.	"The Jungle Book / Sarabande"
2.	"Indiana Jones and the Arabian Nights"
3.	"A Sky Full of Stars"
4.	"Hello / Lacrimosa"
5.	"Jurassic Park Theme"
6.	"(It's Gonna be) Okay (Lyric video)"
7.	"(It's Gonna be) Okay"
8.	"I Want You Back" ( (Note: Inspired by the Brandenburg Concertos No.3 and 4, Two Part Invention No.8, Minuet in G, Bourrée and the Gavotte from French Suite No.5 by Johann Sebastian Bach))
9.	"Fight Song / Amazing Grace"
10.	"Fight Song / Amazing Grace (Behind the Scenes)"

== Charts ==
=== Weekly charts ===
Chart (2016)	Peak position
Canadian Albums (Billboard)	66
US Billboard 200	15
US Top Classical Albums (Billboard)	1
US Top New Age Albums (Billboard)	1

=== Year-end charts ===
Chart (2016)	Position
US Classical Albums (Billboard)	8
US New Age Albums (Billboard)	5

Chart (2017)	Position
US Classical Albums (Billboard)	3
US New Age Albums (Billboard)	1
