= The Piano Guys =

American musical group

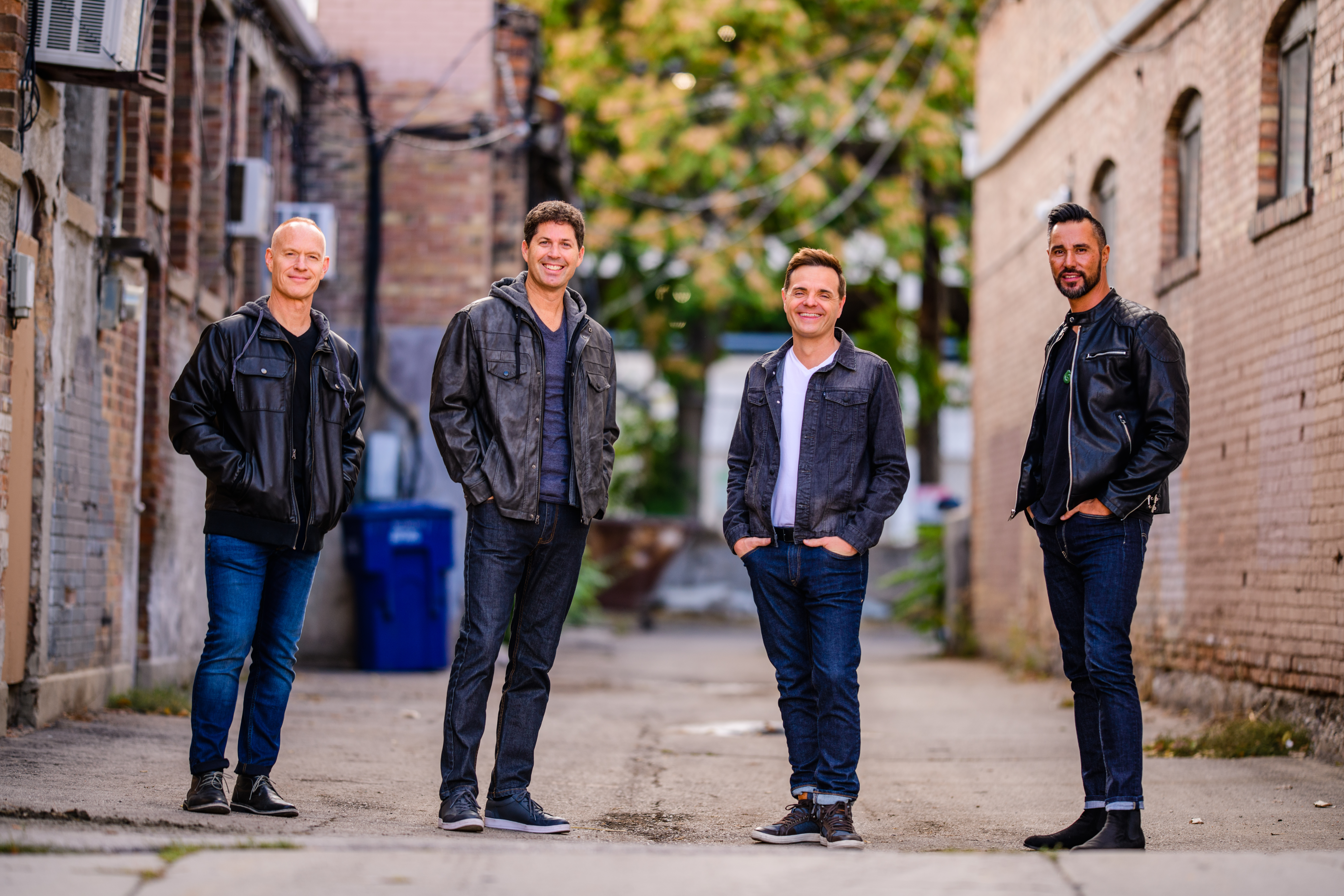
- (Left to right) Jon Schmidt, Paul Anderson, Steven Sharp Nelson, and Al van der Beek

Background information
- Origin: St. George, Utah, U.S.
- Genres: Classical crossover; orchestral pop; Instrumental rock
- Years active: 2010–present
- Label: Sony Masterworks
- Members: Jon Schmidt; Steven Sharp Nelson; Paul Anderson; Al van der Beek
- Past members: Tel Stewart
- Website: www.thepianoguys.com

YouTube information
- Channel: The Piano Guys
- Genre: Music
- Subscribers: 7.09 million
- Views: 2.43 billion
- Last updated: 3 May 2025

The Piano Guys is an American musical group consisting of pianist Jon Schmidt, cellist Steven Sharp Nelson, videographer Paul Anderson, and music producer Al van der Beek. Originating in Utah, they gained popularity through YouTube, where in 2011 they began posting piano and cello compositions combining classical, pop, film score and original music, showcased through elaborate or cinematic videos. As of May 2026 the group had surpassed 2.5 billion views on their YouTube channel and had 7 million subscribers. Their first eight major-label studio albums, The Piano Guys, The Piano Guys 2, A Family Christmas, Wonders, Uncharted, Christmas Together, Limitless, and 10, each reached number one on Billboard Classical Albums or New Age Albums charts.

== History ==
The group originated as a social media strategy for Anderson's piano store, The Piano Guys, in St. George, Utah. Schmidt knew Nelson from years of performing and recording together. Anderson was acquainted with Schmidt, a locally notable pianist who often came in to practice on the pianos when he was in town. In 2009 Anderson saw a music video that Schmidt had uploaded to YouTube, "Love Story Meets Viva la Vida" – a musical blend of the Taylor Swift country pop tune and Coldplay's pop song "Viva la Vida", which Schmidt performed with Nelson on cello. That video logged more than one million hits. Anderson asked the musicians to do more videos that he would professionally film and upload to his store's Facebook and YouTube pages to promote his store. Nelson brought his neighbor, van der Beek, a songwriter and music arranger, onto the team. Shaye Scott and Tel Stewart assisted with video production.

"Michael Meets Mozart" (2011) gained a respectable showing after Schmidt invited the people on his fan mailing list "to watch it and share it". In June 2011 the group won the "Most Up-and-Coming Channel" award in the YouTube "On the Rise" contest, which brought 25,000 new subscribers to their channel. In 2011 and 2012 the group uploaded a new music video every week to two weeks, attracting thousands of new viewers each time. Meanwhile, their focus of selling pianos shifted to solely making music videos and they decided to close the piano store, which closed in March 2012.

By September 2012, The Piano Guys had uploaded more than 30 music videos which had garnered 134 million views, and had 757,000 subscribers on their YouTube channel. That month, facilitated by David Simoné and DSW Management, they signed with Sony Masterworks. After signing, they released their first album, The Piano Guys, which sold gold, followed by The Piano Guys 2 and A Family Christmas in 2013, and Wonders in 2014, which debuted at #12 on the Billboard 200 chart. A fifth album, Uncharted, was released in 2016, followed by a second Christmas album, Christmas Together, the following year. Their seventh major-label album, Limitless, was released in November 2018 on Portrait/Sony Music Masterworks. A new album entitled 10 was released on November 20, 2020, as a celebration of their 10-year anniversary, and of their 10th album so far.

== Musical style ==
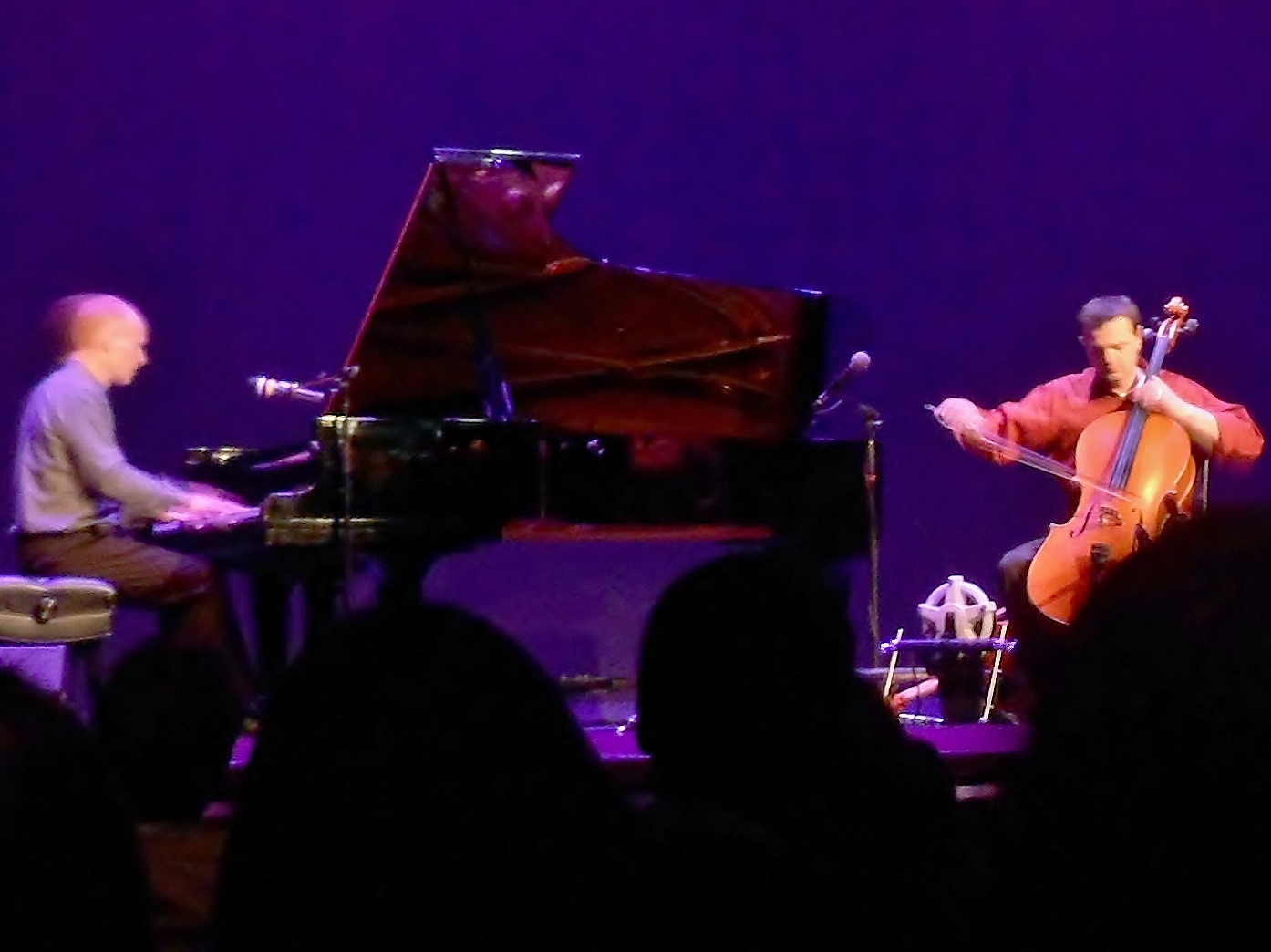
The Piano Guys' Schmidt (left) and Nelson (right) perform live in 2012

The Piano Guys draw on a variety of classical, pop, film score and original music in their compositions for piano and cello. They are especially well known for their mashups of classical and contemporary songs, such as blending Mozart and Adele, Liszt and Coldplay, Tchaikovsky and Shawn Mendes, Bach and Michael Jackson, or Vivaldi's "Winter" and Disney's "Let It Go".

Schmidt, Nelson and van der Beek serve as songwriters for the group. Van der Beek engineers, mixes and masters their studio sessions in addition to occasionally adding his own vocals; Anderson oversees the group's video production, while Nelson and Anderson manage the content and business together.

== Videography ==
The group's YouTube videos show the musicians performing in a variety of settings. These include locations in the Utah desert, at the edge of a 1,000-foot cliff, atop a speeding train, in an ice cave, and at Iguazu Falls, among others. Anderson's goal was "to put pianos and cellos in places nobody would ever expect to see them", thereby generating marketing buzz for his store. In the videos, Schmidt is seen playing a variety of Yamaha grand and baby grand pianos, while Nelson plays custom acoustic and electric cello. They plan to film music videos at each of the New Seven Wonders of the World. As of November 2018, they had performed in front of or on top of four. Videos at the Great Wall of China ("Kung Fu Piano: Cello Ascends"), the Christ the Redeemer statue in Rio de Janeiro ("The Mission/How Great Thou Art"), Chichen Itza ("The Jungle Book/Sarabande"), and Petra ("Indiana Jones and the Arabian Nights") have been completed.

Some songs are composed of several audio tracks mixed together. Occasionally, tracks are superimposed to imitate many instruments played simultaneously. For "Michael Meets Mozart", Nelson prerecorded 100 cello tracks, including percussion effects he made by drumming on the cello itself.

As of February 2024, The Piano Guys have uploaded 227 videos onto their channel and amassed over 2.3 billion views, and 7 million subscribers. Their cover of Christina Perri's "A Thousand Years" is their most-watched video, having logged more than 223 million views as of February 2024. YouTube gave them a plaque at their Greek Theatre Los Angeles concert, commemorating their billionth YouTube view, a feat only achieved by under two hundred YouTube users as of 2019.

== Live performances ==
The Piano Guys tour worldwide. They have appeared in sold-out concerts in the US, Canada, UK, Germany, Hungary, Japan, Korea, Australia, and Russia, among others. Since they began touring they have determined to spread out their time on the road as best they can in order to avoid spending too much time away from family. They have also played at major classical and pop venues, including Carnegie Hall, Greek Theatre, Royal Albert Hall and The Grand Ole Opry.

While many other musical groups declined invitations to perform at the inauguration of Donald Trump in January 2017, the group performed, including a cover of Rachel Platten's Fight Song, which had been played at almost every one of opponent Hillary Clinton's campaign events. The group denied that their performance was "an endorsement or a political statement."

On December 12, 2017, they hosted a live stream on their YouTube channel, called '#LightTheWorld Christmas Concert with The Piano Guys and Friends', accompanied by singers including Peter Hollens and David Archuleta.

== Personal lives ==
Members of The Piano Guys are all middle-aged family men who had other careers before the group gained popularity. Schmidt had a solo musical career with eight albums and seven piano books to his credit; he did solo gigs for two decades. Nelson worked in venture capital and real estate, Anderson owned a piano store, and van der Beek operated a recording studio in his home. After signing with Sony in 2012, all four quit their jobs to pursue their joint musical career. In 2016, Schmidt lost his daughter Annie in a hiking accident. Michelle, his wife, wrote a book about the experience in 2017, titled Carried: How One Mother’s Trust in God Helped Her through the Unthinkable. The group dedicated a song to Annie in 2017: "The Sweetest Gift".

All four are devout members of the Church of Jesus Christ of Latter-day Saints. Each of them served full-time proselyting missions: Anderson in Washington state, Schmidt in Norway, and Nelson and van der Beek in separate missions in South Korea. They have 16 children among their respective families. The group prays together before each recording session, video shoot, concert, and songwriting session, and take inspiration from artists such as Minerva Teichert.

== Discography ==
=== Studio albums ===
Title	Details	Peak chart positions									Sales	Certifications
Title	Details	US	US Class	US New Age	AUS	AUT	CAN	GER	SWI	UK	Sales	Certifications
Hits Volume 1	Released: December 1, 2011; Label: Self-released; Format: Digital download, CD	—	7	1	—	—	—	—	—	—		
The Piano Guys	Released: October 2, 2012; Label: Sony Masterworks; Format: Digital download, CD	44	1	1	—	65	—	51	—	51	US: 500,000	RIAA: Gold; BPI: Silver
The Piano Guys 2	Released: May 7, 2013; Label: Portrait; Format: Digital download, CD	38	1	1	—	—	—	97	—	—		
A Family Christmas	Released: October 22, 2013; Label: Portrait; Format: Digital download, CD	20	1	1	—	—	—	—	—	—		
Wonders	Released: October 7, 2014; Label: Portrait; Format: Digital download, CD	12	1	1	88	—	—	86	46	99		
Uncharted	Released: October 28, 2016; Label: Portrait; Format: Digital download, CD	15	1	1	—	—	66	—	—	—		
Christmas Together	Released: October 27, 2017; Label: Portrait; Format: Digital download, CD	27	1	1	—	—	—	—	—	—		
Limitless	Released: November 9, 2018; Label: Portrait; Format: Digital download, CD	58	2	1	— (Note: Limitless did not chart on the Australian ARIA Albums Chart, but peaked at number 34 on the ARIA Digital Albums Chart.)	—	—	—	—	—		
10	Released: November 20, 2020; Label: Sony Masterworks; Format: Digital download, CD	—	1	1	—	—	—	—	—	—		
Chill	Released: October 21, 2021; Label: The Piano Guys; Format: Digital download, CD	—	23	—	—	—	—	—	—	—		
Unstoppable	Released: November 10, 2023; Label: The Piano Guys; Format: Digital download, CD	—	20	—	—	—	—	—	—	—		
"—" denotes an album that did not chart or was not released.

=== Live albums ===
Title	Details	Peak chart positions		
Title	Details	US	US Class	US New Age
Live!: Carnegie Hall Audio + Red Rocks Concert Video	Released: November 13, 2015; Label: Portrait; Format: Digital download, CD+DVD	111	3	2

=== Compilation albums ===
Title	Details
So Far, So Good	Released: June 6, 2017; Label: Portrait; Format: Digital download, CD

=== Singles ===
- 2016: "(It's Gonna Be) Okay"

=== Videography ===
Title	Date
"Game Day"	March 16, 2010
"Dumb Song"	February 5, 2011
"To The Summit"	May 6, 2011
"Michael Meets Mozart"	May 17, 2011
"BitterSweet"	May 25, 2011
"The Cello Song"	June 14, 2011
"Desert Symphony"	June 21, 2011
"Moonlight"	July 14, 2011
"Rock Meets Rachmaninoff"	July 25, 2011
"Bring Him Home"	August 10, 2011
"Twinkle Lullaby"	August 24, 2011
"Rolling In The Deep"	September 7, 2011
"Nearer My God to Thee"	September 21, 2011
"All of me"	October 3, 2011
"More Than Words"	November 4, 2011
"Without You"	November 10, 2011
"Cello Wars (Star Wars Parody)"	December 2, 2011
"Carol of the Bells"	December 19, 2011
"Paradise"	January 9, 2012
"Just the Way You Are"	January 27, 2012
"Beethoven's 5 Secrets"	February 9, 2012
"Over The Rainbow/ Simple Gifts"	February 27, 2012
"Can't Help Falling In Love"	March 16, 2012
"Me and My Cello- Happy Together"	March 30, 2012
"Code Name Vivaldi"	April 25, 2012
"A Thousand Years"	May 9, 2012
"Rockelbel's Canon"	May 29, 2012
"Waterfall"	June 13, 2012
"What Makes You Beautiful"	July 18, 2012
"Titanium/ Pavane"	October 3, 201
"Lord of the Rings"	November 20, 2012
"O come, O come, Emmanuel"	December 4, 2012
"We Three Kings"	December 13, 2012
"Rudolph"	December 20, 2012
"Mission Impossible"	January 7, 2013
"Begin Again"	February 13, 2013
"Berlin"	April 10, 2013
"Home"	May 15, 2013
"Don't You Worry Child"	July 24, 2013
"Kung Fu Piano: Cello Ascends"	October 9, 2013
"Arwen's Vigil"	November 12, 2013
"Angels We Have Heard On High"	November 29, 2013
"Let It Go"	February 19, 2014
"The Mission/ How Great Thou Art"	April 2, 2014
"Story of My Life"	May 22, 2014
"Ants Marching/Ode To Joy"	November 12, 2014
"#sharethegift"	December 12, 2014
"I Want You Bach"	March 17, 2015
"What Are Your Words"	May 7, 2015
"Jurassic Park Theme"	June 10, 2015
"A Sky Full of Stars"	October 3, 2015
"This Is Your Fight Song"	October 29, 2015
"Silent Night"	November 30, 2015
"Hello"	January 28, 2016
"The Jungle Book/ Sarabande"	May 3, 2016
"It's Gonna Be OKAY"	September 19, 2016
"Indiana Jones…"	November 1, 2016
"(It's Gonna Be) Okay"	May 25, 2017
"Perfect"	July 26, 2017
"Flicker"	November 9, 2017
"Ode To Joy To The World"	November 16, 2017
"O Holy Night/Ave Maria"	November 30, 2017
"88 Piano Keys..I Saw Three Ships"	December 9, 2017
"If you're missing someone…"	December 19, 2017
"Rewrite the Stars"	March 7, 2018
"A Million Dreams"	November 15, 2018
"Epiphany"	November 27, 2018
"Avatar"	June 25, 2019
"Someone You Loved"	August 27, 2019
"Something Just Like This / Hungarian Rhapsody"	September 25, 2019
"The Avengers / Portals"	November 12, 2019
"All I Want for Christmas Is You"	November 25, 2019
"Let It Snow / Winter Wonderland"	December 10, 2019
"Bless The Broken Road"	April 24, 2020
"Pictures At An Exhibition"	May 21, 2020
"You Say / Sonata Pathètique"	September 22, 2020
"Für Elise Jam"	November 11, 2020
"Thinking Out Loud"	November 12, 2020
"Someone to You"	November 19, 2020

== Awards ==
YouTube Music Awards

Year	Category	Work	Result
2013	Response of the Year	"Titanium/Pavane"	Nominated
