= Christmas Together (The Piano Guys album) =

Studio album by The Piano Guys
- Released: October 27, 2017
- Genre: Classical crossover
- Length: 47:07
- Label: Portrait
- Producer: Al van der Beek, Steven Sharp Nelson, Jon Schmidt

The Piano Guys chronology
Uncharted (2016)	Christmas Together (2017)	Limitless (2018)

Christmas Together is the seventh studio album by American musical group The Piano Guys. Released on October 27, 2017, by Portrait (a division of Sony Masterworks), the album reached number 27 on the US Billboard 200. It also topped the Billboard Classical, New Age, and Holiday albums charts. The video for "Angels from the Realms of Glory" broke the largest live nativity world record, with 1,039 people attending.

== Track listing ==
No.	Title	Writer(s)	Length
1.	"Angels from the Realms of Glory" (featuring Peter Hollens, David Archuleta, and the Mormon Tabernacle Choir)	Marshall McDonald, Mack Wilberg, James Chadwick	4:05
2.	"O Holy Night / Ave Maria" (featuring Lexi Walker)	Adolphe Adam, Placide Cappeau, Charles Gounod, Johann Sebastian Bach	5:17
3.	"Mary Did You Know / Corelli Christmas Concerto"	Mark Lowry, Buddy Greene	4:01
4.	"Ode to Joy to the World"	Ludwig van Beethoven, Isaac Watts	4:06
5.	"What Child is This"	William Chatterton Dix	2:58
6.	"Gloria / Hark! The Herald Angels Sing"	Al van der Beek, Felix Mendelssohn, William H. Cummings, Charles Wesley	3:53
7.	"O Little One Sweet, BWV 493" (featuring The King’s Singers)	Johann Sebastian Bach	3:43
8.	"Little Drummer Boy / Do You Hear What I Hear"	Katherine Kennicott Davis, Gloria Shayne Baker, Noël Regney	3:54
9.	"Silent Night, Holy Night" (featuring Plácido Domingo)	Franz Xaver Gruber, Joseph Mohr	3:28
10.	"I Saw Three Ships"	Traditional	2:42
11.	"The Manger"	Schmidt, Nelson, van der Beek	4:00
12.	"The Sweetest Gift (Dedicated to Annie Schmidt)" (featuring Craig Aven)	Craig Aven	5:00
Total length:			47:07

== Personnel ==
The Piano Guys

- Steven Sharp Nelson - Cellist/Songwriter
- Jon Schmidt - Pianist/Songwriter/Additional vocals/Synth
- Al van der Beek - Music Producer/Songwriter/Guitarist/Additional vocals
- Paul Anderson - Video Producer/Videographer

Additional musicians

- Peter Hollens - vocals on "Angels from the Realms of Glory"
- David Archuleta - vocals on "Angels from the Realms of Glory"
- Mormon Tabernacle Choir - vocals on "Angels from the Realms of Glory"
- Evynne Hollens - additional vocals on "Angels from the Realms of Glory"
- Kristiana Sandberg, Kathryn Collier, Kathryn Leavitt, Sarah Crowther - violin on "Angels from the Realms of Glory"
- Candace Wagner, Emily Brown - viola on "Angels from the Realms of Glory"
- Kelly McConkie Stewart, Sarah Arnesen - additional cello on "Angels from the Realms of Glory"
- Ben Henderson - bass on "Angels from the Realms of Glory"
- Giles Reaves - percussion on "Angels from the Realms of Glory"
- Lexi Walker - lead vocals on O Holy Night / Ave Maria
- Chuck E. Myers - Additional vocals, additional bells & percussion on "Ode to Joy to the World"
- Kelly Wallis - orchestral percussion on "Ode to Joy to the World"
- Seretta Hart - trumpet on "Ode to Joy to the World"
- Debra Bonner Unity Gospel Choir - additional vocals on "Ode to Joy to the World"
- Wesley Bell Ringers - bells on "Ode to Joy to the World"
- Jake Bowen - additional vocals on "Ode to Joy to the World"
- Debra Bonner, Terry Waite - conducting on "Ode to Joy to the World"
- The King's Singers - lead vocals on "O Little One Sweet, BWV 493"
- Plácido Domingo - lead vocals on "Silent Night, Holy Night"
- Craig Aven - lead vocals on "The Sweetest Gift"

== Charts ==
=== Weekly charts ===
Chart (2017)	Peak position
US Billboard 200	27
US Top Classical Albums (Billboard)	1
US Top Holiday Albums (Billboard)	1
US Top New Age Albums (Billboard)	1

=== Year end charts ===
Chart (2017)	Position
US Classical Albums (Billboard)	10
US New Age Albums (Billboard)	3

== See also ==
- List of Billboard number-one holiday albums of the 2010s
