= Just the Way You Are (Bruno Mars song) =

2010 single by Bruno Mars

Single by Bruno Mars

from the album Doo-Wops & Hooligans
- Released: July 20, 2010
- Genre: Pop; soft rock; R&B
- Length: 3:41
- Label: Elektra; Atlantic
- Songwriters: Bruno Mars; Philip Lawrence; Ari Levine; Khalil Walton; Khari Cain
- Producers: The Smeezingtons; Needlz

Bruno Mars singles chronology
"Billionaire" (2010)	"Just the Way You Are" (2010)	"Grenade" (2010)

Music video
- "Just the Way You Are" on YouTube

"Just the Way You Are" is the debut solo single by American singer-songwriter Bruno Mars. It is the lead single from his debut studio album, Doo-Wops & Hooligans (2010). The song was written by Mars, Philip Lawrence, Ari Levine, Khalil Walton, and Needlz and produced by the former three, under their alias, the Smeezingtons along with Needlz. It was released in the United States to contemporary hit radio on August 10, 2010. The track was released in the United Kingdom on September 19, 2010, as "Just the Way You Are (Amazing)". The song's lyrics compliment a woman's beauty.

It received mixed reviews from music critics, who praised the Smeezingtons' production but dubbed its lyrics as sappy and corny. It won Best Male Pop Vocal Performance at the 53rd Annual Grammy Awards. The song peaked at number one on the US Billboard Hot 100, Australia, Canada, New Zealand, and in the United Kingdom charts and peaked in the top five in other countries. It was certified twenty-one times platinum by the Recording Industry Association of America (RIAA), seven times platinum by the Australian Recording Industry Association (ARIA) and by Recorded Music NZ (RMNZ). It was also certified diamond by Music Canada (MC). "Just the Way You Are" was the best-selling digital single of 2011, selling over 12.5 million copies, thus joining an elite group of best-selling singles worldwide. It is the highest certified single in RIAA history.

The music video, directed by Ethan Lader, was released on September 8, 2010, and features Peruvian-Australian actress Nathalie Kelley. Mars performed "Just The Way You Are" on Saturday Night Live and at The Ellen DeGeneres Show. He has sung "Just the Way You Are" on all his tours since 2010, and included it during his performance at the Super Bowl XLVIII halftime show. The song has been covered by various artists and it inspired Meghan Trainor's debut single "All About That Bass" (2014).

== Writing and production ==
Bruno Mars said of the song, "It took me months to come up with 'Just the Way You Are'... I wasn't thinking of anything deep or poetic. I was telling a story. Get ready to fall in love!" It was inspired by Eric Clapton's "Wonderful Tonight" (1977) and Sinéad O'Connor's "Nothing Compares 2 U" (1990). Mars explained, "I'm a big fan of songs like Joe Cocker's 'You Are So Beautiful' and Clapton's 'Wonderful Tonight' – songs that go straight to the point. You know, there's no mind-boggling lyrics or twists in the story – they just come directly from the heart. And to me 'Just The Way You Are' is one of those songs. There's nothing mind-blowing about it. I'm just telling a woman she looks beautiful the way she IS – and, let's be honest, what woman doesn't wanna hear those lyrics?!"

Mars's A&R, Aaron Bay-Schuck, was responsible for finding the original idea from American record producers and songwriters Khalil Walton and Needlz. Mars originally sang the hook that Khalil and Needlz wrote for a feature on a Lupe Fiasco record. Needlz allowed Mars to use the idea for his album. This was all facilitated by Bay-Shuck, who told HitQuarters that as soon as "Just the Way You Are" was finished they knew they had the first single, saying:

"It had a massive chorus, an instantly memorable melody and lyric, and was a natural transition from the B.o.B and Travie McCoy songs ... [Also] it didn't sound like anything else on the radio. It had everything we could want in a first single for Bruno."

Ari Levine explained: "Needlz had a track with a melody idea by Khalil Walton that was presented to us by one of the A&R guys. Bruno and Phil came up with the chorus, and then Needlz sent us the files and we replaced a bunch of sounds with our sounds and I programmed drums in the MPC, and we wrote the rest of the song. I never met Needlz or Walton". The song was offered to Lupe Fiasco and CeeLo Green, but at that point, Mars decided to keep it.

"Just the Way You Are" was written by Mars, Philip Lawrence, Levine, Walton, and Needlz, while production was handled by the Smeezingtons along with Needlz. Levine and Mars played all the instruments on the track, with the former engineering the song at Levcon Studios in California. The track was mixed at Larrabee Sound Studios in Los Angeles by Manny Marroquin, while Christian Plata and Erik Madrid served as mixing assistants. It was mastered by Stephen Marcussen at Marcussen Mastering in Hollywood, California.

== Release ==
"Just the Way You Are" was released as the lead single from Doo-Wops & Hooligans. Elektra Records serviced the song to download in the United States on July 20, 2010. It was released in the United States to contemporary hit radio on August 10, 2010, by Elektra and Atlantic Records. On September 27, 2010, the song was released for digital download, under the name "Just the Way You Are (Amazing)". On November 2, seven remixes were released as a purchasable download in US. It was released as a CD single in Germany, Austria, and Switzerland, on November 12. It contains the album version of the song and the remix by Skrillex Batboi. The original track was released on September 27, 2010, in the United Kingdom via digital download. On November 2, 2010, an EP that includes several remixes was released in various countries. Skrillex, Martin Danielle, and the Manufactured Superstars were among the names to remix the original version. A deluxe edition which includes the official remix with rapper Lupe Fiasco and the music video was released on November 25, 2010. The official remix was also released on the deluxe edition of Doo-Wops & Hooligans (2010).

== Composition and lyrical interpretation ==
"Just the Way You Are"
An 18-second sample of the song's "steeply rising melody" on the chorus

"Just the Way You Are" is a pop, R&B, and soft rock ballad. Its instrumentation features a "winkling piano" and a "hip-hop breakbeat" kick drum. Tim Byron of The Vine.com said "the steeply rising melody at the start of the chorus introduces a little tension before defusing it with the catchy tag of the chorus, which is simple and effective as a hook". Billboard said that Mars "takes his dreamy soprano to the next level" on the track. The song is in the key of F major and follows the chord progression of F–Dm–B♭–F. Mars's vocal range spans from F_{3} to C_{5}.

Billboard called "Just the Way You Are" "a feel-good jam". Leah Greenblatt of Entertainment Weekly labeled the song "sweetly smitten ballad". Brad Wete, writing for the same publication, described the track as "an endearing mid-tempo". Wete also said its "vibe" resembles the "collaboration with B.o.B–just not as groovy". Nick Levine from Digital Spy describe it as a "huge-hearted urbany piano ballad", comparing its sound to "Empire State of Mind" (2009)." The song has been compared to a "U2 production" by Jon Caramanica of The New York Times and by Andy Gill adding that he felt a "groove through R&B territory". Tim Sendra of AllMusic called the debut single "lushly romantic". Scott Kara for the New Zealand Herald dubbed the song as a "ballad boogie".

Lyrically, the song is about Mars professing "his love for a beautiful girl who occupies his dreams", on the verses "When you smile, the whole world stops and stares for a while/ 'Cause girl you're amazing, just the way you are". Billboard concludes, "Mars pens lyrics that aim to make female listeners feel nothing short of perfect in their own skin". Byron said the lyrics are "effective – the repeated lines at the start of the verses are catchy". Consequence of Sound's Alex Young described the song "Mars sticks to the song's name and insists that he wouldn't want to change anything about his particular gal. You believe him, too. With an undeniably catchy chorus". Lester said the lyrics are "about a girl Mars could 'kiss all day'."

== Reception and accolades ==
The song received mixed reviews from music critics. Digital Spy's Nick Levine gave it four out of five stars and described it as a "huge-hearted urbany piano ballad [...] with a similar, if not quite as undeniable, instant classic feel to 'Empire State of Mind' by Jay-Z featuring Alicia Keys". Billboard wrote: "With its steady, danceable pulse and singalong chorus, Mars has created a feel-good jam that should establish him as a solo contender in his own right." Alex Young from Consequence of Sound praised the track's chorus for being "undeniably catchy" and didn't find surprising for the single to be a "radio staple". AllMusic's Tim Sendra gave the single a mixed review saying, "it's not very deep and it's not poetry, but sweetly played and sung". He believes it, "will melt hearts from tweens to old folk". Tony Clayton-Lea of The Irish Times dubbed the single "a slice of wide-eyed pop that automatically coaxes a smile."

On the other hand, Tim Byron of The Vine compared "Just the Way You Are" to Billy Joel's 1977 hit single of the same name, saying the latter "is a little more ambiguous...more aware of the ups and downs that characterize relationships". Jamie Milton of musicOMH explained that "Just the Way You Are" can be mistaken for a pop song due to its tempo. However, it is one of the most "sappiest ballads" to be heard in some time. Nima Baniamer from Contactmusic.com felt the single didn't make Mars stand out from other R&B artists. Baniamer added, "The song never builds to any climax and it simply falls a bit flat, coming across quite corny and cheesy." The Guardian's Paul Lester dubbed Mars's vocals on the track as a "breezy falsetto as characterless as you'd imagine."

The song was nominated for the 2010 The Record of the Year ceremony. In 2011, the song won the Grammy Award for Best Male Pop Vocal Performance. The single was nominated for several awards at 2011 Billboard Music Awards such as Top Hot 100 Song and Top Pop Song, but it ended up by winning only the category Top Radio Song. It was nominated for Choice Music: Love Song at the 2011 Teen Choice Awards. In the same year, the single was one of the winners of Most Performed Songs at ASCAP Pop Music Awards. In 2012, at the same award ceremony, it won, again, Most Performed Songs and also Song of the Year. At the RTHK International Pop Poll Awards the song won "Top 10 Gold International Gold Songs". According to Rolling Stone's Maya Georgi the track "kicked off pop's body positivity era". It inspired Meghan Trainor's debut single "All About That Bass" (2014).

== Commercial performance ==
The song reached the top of the US Billboard Hot 100 on the chart dated October 2, 2010, ending the two-week reign of Katy Perry's "Teenage Dream" (2010). The song spent a total of 48 weeks on the Billboard Hot 100, debuting on August 7, 2010, and leaving the chart on July 2, 2011. It became Mars second longest charting song on the Billboard Hot 100 as a solo and fourth overall. As of October 2015, the song had sold 6.7 million downloads domestically. Luminate published their 2025 Mid-Year report and the song had 91.9 On-Demand audio streams. "Just the Way You Are" was certified twenty-one times platinum by the Recording Industry Association of America (RIAA). As of October 2025, it became the highest certified single in RIAA history. It holds the record of the longest-reigning debut format on the Adult Contemporary, having spent 20 weeks atop. The song peaked at number one on the Canadian Hot 100 and was certified diamond by Music Canada (MC).

On September 26, 2010, it became the singer's second number-one single in the United Kingdom, where it hit the number-one spot again on October 24, 2010, from sales of 116,000 copies becoming the first song ever to have left the top three before rebounding to the top spot. It sold 766,000 copies during 2010, becoming the third biggest seller of the year. On April 9, 2013, it was revealed that the song is the ninth most downloaded song of all time in the United Kingdom. On August 2, 2011 "Just The Way You Are" became the 108th million-selling single in the UK, having taken 43 weeks to reach that figure. As of September 2017, in the United Kingdom, the single had reached a total of 1.57 million combined sales (1.33 million purchases and 244,72 streaming equivalent sales), becoming the 75th biggest selling single of all-time in UK. "Just the Way You Are" is the seventeenth best-selling single based on paid-for sales of the 21st century in the United Kingdom. It was certified six times platinum by the British Phonographic Industry (BPI). On October 12, 2010, Bruno Mars got his third number one single in the Dutch Top 40, after "Nothin' On You" (2009) and "Billionaire" (2010), having spent 11 weeks at number one in Netherlands. The song also reached number one in Australia and was certified seven times platinum by the Australian Recording Industry Association (ARIA). The single debuted at number 31 in New Zealand on August 2, 2010. The song was number 1 for two weeks. The single was on the chart for 32 weeks. It was certified eight times platinum by Recorded Music NZ (RMNZ).

"Just The Way You Are" also peaked at number three in Switzerland, at number one in the Republic of Ireland, at number four in Belgium (Flanders), and at number 2 in Germany and Sweden. It reached number six at Denmark. "Just the Way You Are" was the best selling digital single of 2011, selling more than 12.5 million copies globally throughout that year, thus becoming one of the best-selling singles of all time. The song is also one of the UK's biggest selling singles of all-time placed at number 74 with sales around 1.17 million.

== Music video ==
=== Development and synopsis ===
Bruno Mars arranging himself in a cassette tape in the shape of him playing the piano, in the music video.

The corresponding music video was directed by Ethan Lander, shot in September 2010 in the downtown of Los Angeles and released on September 8, 2010. Cameron Duddy was able to shoot the behind-the-scenes footage in exchange for his jean jacket, which Mars used during the music video. The video features Peruvian-Australian actress Nathalie Kelley. Lander considers Bruno Mars a star. He adds "The charisma that he has, you can't teach." Finishing with "singer even manages to be suave in his mugshot, which is no small feat!" He sees the video as a collaboration, the video director came up with the vision and Mars added his vision and so on. The video is a mixture of live-action and stop-motion animation and through the animation, Bruno shows his girlfriend how beautiful she is. He takes a cassette tape and starts creating images out of the tape and they start to get a life of their own.

The video begins with Kelley listening to "Just the Way You Are" on her Walkman as Mars walks in. Mars stops the tape player, removes the cassette tape, and begins singing his song. As the instrumental portion of the song begins, Mars pulls the media out of the cassette tape and arranges the media into letters forming his name followed by the song title. As the song continues, he forms a picture of a drum, again on the table, using the tape media. Additional images of similar construction follow throughout the video including a portrait of Mars as well as one of Kelley blinking her eyes and smiling as Mars continues singing. Most of the images shown are animated, including a bell which Mars rings with his fingers in synchronization with the chimes near the end of the song. Lastly, Mars finishes the song while singing and playing an upright piano while Kelley watches and smiles. The video was inspired by the artwork of Erika Iris Simmons after Lader discovered her "Ghost in the Machine" cassette portrait series online.

=== Reception ===
At the 2011 MTV Video Music Aid Japan the music video won Best Male Video. In the same year, the video won Favorite International Video at the Myx Music Awards and received three nominations at the MuchMusic Video Awards, International Video of the Year – Artist, Most Watched Video of the Year and UR Fave International Video. It received the award for Popular International Music Video at the Channel [V] Thailand Music Video Awards. As of February 2024, the music video has received over 1.9 billion views on YouTube.

== Live performances ==
Bruno Mars performed the song at the Bowery Ballroom in New York City on August 25, 2010, with him and his four-piece band dressed in blue tuxedos and black skinny ties. John Macdonald for Spin said "Despite a couple pitch problems here and there, Mars proved to be nearly as good a performer as he is a songwriter". Mars performed the song on Saturday Night Live on October 9, 2010. The song was performed at The Ellen DeGeneres Show, on October 14, 2010. A soulful arrangement of the song was sung for a Billboard Tastemakers video session, on October 22, 2010. An acoustic version of the song was performed at Grammy Nominations concert in 2010 for the 53rd Grammy Awards. Mars also played the song live at the BBC Radio 1Xtra Live Lounge and at the NBA All-Star Tip Off Pre-Show in January and February 2011, respectively. The song was also performed on NBC's Today Show on June 24, 2011. A live performance was also done on the French X Factor during the finale of the second season. Carolina Frost for the Huffington Post said that Mars at the 2012 Brit Awards "took his poptastic song Just the Way You Are, and gave it a fresh jazzy arrangement." Others praised Mars's vocality and confidence with his soulful rendition.

It was the twelfth song of his debut world tour, The Doo-Wops & Hooligans Tour (2010–12), and was often sung as an encore on the Hooligans in Wondaland Tour (2011). It was part of the setlist of his second world tour, The Moonshine Jungle Tour (2013–14) and was also sung on his debut concert residency, Bruno Mars at The Chelsea, Las Vegas (2013–15). "Just the Way You Are" was performed as his last song at the Super Bowl XLVIII halftime show as a Tribute to the United States Armed Forces. In 2017, the singer participated in the "Somos Una Voz" relief initiative concert by singing a Spanish version of "Just the Way You Are". On his third tour, the 24K Magic World Tour (2017–18), the track was the fourteenth or fifteenth track of the setlist. The track was part of the Bruno Mars Live (2022–2024) setlist.

== Cover versions and usage on other media ==
"Just the Way You Are" has been covered several times. It was first covered by Nathan Sykes from The Wanted, The Saturdays at BBC Radio 1's Live Lounge on October 29, 2010. Matt Cardle, the winner of the seventh series of British TV talent contest The X Factor, performed "Just the Way You Are" in week 2 of the live shows and later recorded his own version of the song, which was included in the CD single release of his debut single "When We Collide" (2010). San Diego band Pierce the Veil covered the track for the compilation album Punk Goes Pop 4, which was released on November 21, 2011. Daniel Evans, a finalist on The X Factor (UK), included his version of the song on his album Wicked Game, released on December 2, 2013. The album contains covers from various artists.

American singer Johnny Mathis covered the song in his album, Johnny Mathis Sings the Great New American Songbook (2017). Dana International performed the song during the interval of the first semi-final of the Eurovision Song Contest 2019 in Tel Aviv. In 2020, British singer Jamie Miller covered "Just the Way You Are" as part of the tenth anniversary of Mars's debut album.

It was performed by Cory Monteith on "Furt", an episode of the American TV show Glee which aired on November 23, 2010. The show's cover version achieved moderate success by peaking at number 24 in Canada. It reached number 40 in the United States, 47 in Australia, and 48 in Ireland. In 2012, Dominican musician Karlos Rosé covered the song in bachata as his debut single which peaked at number 31 on the Billboard Hot Latin Songs chart. The music video for his cover was filmed in New York City and directed by Robert Kruz. The original version is featured in the movie Pitch Perfect (2012). In 2017, Mars participated in the "Somos Una Voz" relief initiative in order to help survivors of Hurricane Maria in Puerto Rico and Mexico's 7.1 earthquake. He performed "Just the Way You Are" in Spanish for the first time.

== Track listing ==
Digital download
No.	Title	Length
1.	"Just the Way You Are"	3:40

Digital download – Deluxe single
No.	Title	Length
1.	"Just the Way You Are"	3:40
2.	"Just the Way You Are" (featuring Lupe Fiasco) (Remix)	3:58
3.	"Just the Way You Are" (music video)	3:56

CD single
No.	Title	Length
1.	"Just the Way You Are" (Album version)	3:40
2.	"Just the Way You Are" (Skrillex Batboi Remix)	3:50

Digital download – Remixes
No.	Title	Length
1.	"Just the Way You Are" (Simon Steur Club Mix)	5:37
2.	"Just the Way You Are" (Simon Steur Dub)	5:37
3.	"Just the Way You Are" (Carl Louis & Martin Danielle Club Mix)	5:19
4.	"Just the Way You Are" (Carl Louis & Martin Danielle Classic Mix)	5:17
5.	"Just the Way You Are" (Manufactured Superstars Remix)	7:24
6.	"Just the Way You Are" (Steve Smart & Westfunk Club Mix)	7:06
7.	"Just the Way You Are" (Skrillex Batboi Remix)	3:49

== Personnel ==
Credits adapted from the liner notes of Doo-Wops & Hooligans.

- Bruno Mars – lead vocals, songwriting, instrumentation
- Philip Lawrence – songwriting
- Ari Levine – songwriting, instrumentation, engineer
- The Smeezingtons – production
- Needlz – production, songwriting
- Khalil Walton – songwriting
- Manny Marroquin – mixing
- Christian Plata – mixing assistant
- Erik Madrid – mixing assistant
- Stephen Marcussen - mastering

== Charts ==
=== Weekly charts ===
List of chart positions
Chart (2010–2011)	Peak position
Australia (ARIA)	1
Austria (Ö3 Austria Top 40)	1
Belgium (Ultratop 50 Flanders)	4
Belgium (Ultratop 50 Wallonia)	17
Canada Hot 100 (Billboard)	1
Canada AC (Billboard)	1
Canada CHR/Top 40 (Billboard)	1
Canada Hot AC (Billboard)	1
CIS Airplay (TopHit)	20
Czech Republic Airplay (ČNS IFPI)	14
Denmark (Tracklisten)	6
Finland (Suomen virallinen lista)	17
France (SNEP)	33
Germany (GfK)	2
Hungary (Rádiós Top 40)	2
Ireland (IRMA)	1
Israel (Media Forest)	1
Italy (FIMI)	5
Japan Hot 100 (Billboard)	51
Luxembourg Digital Song Sales (Billboard)	6
Mexico (Billboard Mexican Airplay)	9
Mexico Anglo (Monitor Latino)	3
Netherlands (Dutch Top 40)	1
Netherlands (Single Top 100)	1
New Zealand (Recorded Music NZ)	1
Norway (VG-lista)	4
Poland Airplay (ZPAV)	2
Portugal Digital Songs Sales (Billboard)	3
Romania (Romanian Top 100)	2
Russia Airplay (TopHit)	16
Scottish Singles Sales (Official Charts)	1
Slovakia Airplay (ČNS IFPI)	3
South Korea International (Gaon)	13
Spain (Promusicae)	18
Sweden (Sverigetopplistan)	2
Switzerland (Schweizer Hitparade)	3
UK Singles (Official Charts)	1
US Billboard Hot 100	1
US Adult Contemporary (Billboard)	1
US Adult Pop Airplay (Billboard)	1
US Dance Airplay (Billboard)	7
US Hot Latin Songs (Billboard)	24
US Pop Airplay (Billboard)	1
US Rhythmic Airplay (Billboard)	2
Venezuela Pop Rock General Airplay (Record Report)	1

List of chart positions
Chart (2021–2026)	Peak position
Brazil Hot 100 (Billboard)	87
Estonia Airplay (TopHit)	147
Global 200 (Billboard)	60
Malaysia International (RIM)	17
Philippines (Philippines Hot 100)	37
Romania Airplay (TopHit)	91
Singapore (RIAS)	12
Taiwan (Billboard)	15

List of chart positions for Glee version
Chart (2010)	Peak position
Australia (ARIA)	47
Canada Hot 100 (Billboard)	24
Ireland (IRMA)	48
US Billboard Hot 100	40

List of chart position for Karlos Rosé version
Chart (2012)	Peak position
US Hot Latin Songs (Billboard)	31

=== Year-end charts ===
List of chart positions
Chart (2010)	Position
Australia (ARIA)	8
Austria (Ö3 Austria Top 40)	53
Belgium (Ultratop Flanders)	58
Brazil Airplay (Crowley)	59
Canada (Canadian Hot 100)	25
Denmark (Tracklisten)	36
Germany (Official German Charts)	32
Hungary (Rádiós Top 40)	49
Ireland (IRMA)	6
Italy (FIMI)	77
Japan (Japan Hot 100)	95
Japan Adult Contemporary (Billboard Japan)	17
Netherlands (Dutch Top 40)	16
Netherlands (Single Top 100)	19
New Zealand (Recorded Music NZ)	4
Romania Airplay (Romanian Top 100)	89
Sweden (Sverigetopplistan)	9
Switzerland (Schweizer Hitparade)	64
UK Singles (OCC)	3
US Billboard Hot 100	18
US Adult Contemporary (Billboard)	46
US Adult Top 40 (Billboard)	45
US Mainstream Top 40 (Billboard)	20
US Rhythmic (Billboard)	20

List of chart positions
Chart (2011)	Position
Australia (ARIA)	65
Austria (Ö3 Austria Top 40)	29
Belgium (Ultratop Flanders)	32
Belgium (Ultratop Wallonia)	88
Brazil Airplay (Crowley)	12
Canada (Canadian Hot 100)	28
Denmark (Tracklisten)	41
Germany (Official German Charts)	40
Hungary (Rádiós Top 40)	19
Israel Airplay (Media Forest)	33
Netherlands (Dutch Top 40)	64
Netherlands (Single Top 100)	33
New Zealand (Recorded Music NZ)	48
Romania Airplay (Romanian Top 100)	77
Russia Airplay (TopHit)	67
Sweden (Sverigetopplistan)	35
Switzerland (Schweizer Hitparade)	28
UK Singles (OCC)	67
US Billboard Hot 100	15
US Adult Top 40 (Billboard)	9
US Adult Contemporary (Billboard)	1
US Mainstream Top 40 (Billboard)	47

List of chart positions
Chart (2024)	Position
Global 200 (Billboard)	156

List of chart positions
Chart (2025)	Position
Argentina Anglo Airplay (Monitor Latino)	99
Global 200 (Billboard)	97

=== Decade-end charts ===
List of chart positions
Chart (2010–2019)	Position
Australia (ARIA)	86
UK Singles (OCC)	55
US Billboard Hot 100	22

=== All-time charts ===
List of chart positions
Chart	Position
Dutch Love Songs (Dutch Top 40)	9
US Billboard Hot 100	91
UK Singles (OCC)	72

== Certifications ==
List of certifications
Region	Certification	Certified units/sales
Australia (ARIA)	7× Platinum	490,000^{‡}
Austria (IFPI Austria)	Platinum	30,000^{*}
Belgium (BRMA)	Platinum	30,000^{*}
Canada (Music Canada)	Diamond	800,000^{‡}
Denmark (IFPI Danmark)	4× Platinum	360,000^{‡}
Germany (BVMI)	5× Gold	750,000^{‡}
Ireland (IRMA)	Platinum	15,000^{^}
Italy (FIMI)	2× Platinum	100,000^{‡}
Japan (RIAJ)	Gold	100,000^{*}
Mexico (AMPROFON)	Platinum	60,000^{*}
New Zealand (RMNZ)	8× Platinum	240,000^{‡}
Portugal (AFP)	4× Platinum	40,000^{‡}
Spain (Promusicae)	3× Platinum	180,000^{‡}
Switzerland (IFPI Switzerland)	Platinum	30,000^{^}
United Kingdom (BPI)	6× Platinum	3,600,000^{‡}
United States (RIAA)	21× Platinum	21,000,000^{‡}
Streaming
Denmark (IFPI Danmark)	Platinum	100,000^{†}
Japan (RIAJ)	Platinum	100,000,000^{†}
^{*} Sales figures based on certification alone.^{^} Shipments figures based on certification alone.^{‡} Sales+streaming figures based on certification alone.^{†} Streaming-only figures based on certification alone.

== Release history ==
List of release history showing region(s), date(s), format(s), version(s) and label(s)
Region	Date	Format	Version	Label	Ref.
United States	July 20, 2010	Digital download	Original	Elektra	
United States	August 10, 2010	Contemporary hit radio	Original	Elektra; Atlantic	
United Kingdom	September 27, 2010	Digital download	Original	Unknown	
United States	November 2, 2010	Digital download	Remixes	Warner Music Group	
Germany	November 12, 2010	CD single	Original; remix	Elektra	
Austria	November 12, 2010	CD single	Original; remix	Elektra	
Switzerland	November 12, 2010	CD single	Original; remix	Elektra	
United States	November 25, 2010	Digital download	Deluxe single	Elektra	

== See also ==
- List of Adult Top 40 number-one songs of the 2010s
- List of best-selling singles
- List of best-selling singles in Australia
- List of best-selling singles in the United States
- List of Dutch Top 40 number-one singles of 2010
- List of Hot 100 number-one singles of 2010 (Canada)
- List of Hot 100 number-one singles of 2010 (U.S.)
- List of Mainstream Top 40 number-one hits of 2010 (U.S.)
- List of number-one adult contemporary singles of 2011 (U.S.)
- List of number-one Billboard Tropical Songs of 2012
- List of number-one hits of 2010 (Austria)
- List of number-one singles from the 2010s (New Zealand)
- List of number-one singles from the 2010s (UK)
- List of number-one singles of 2010 (Australia)
- List of number-one singles of 2010 (Ireland)
