= Saint Cassius (musician) =

American musician

Cassius Khalil
- Born: New York City, United States
- Origin: New York, New York
- Genre: Hip Hop
- Occupations: Artist, Entrepreneur
- Years active: 2017-2021
- Label: Vinyl Crown Recordings
- Website: www.vinylcrown.com

"Cassius" Khalil Walton is an American musician, recording artist and independent music publisher based in New York City.

He gained notoriety as a musician for his contribution to the Grammy Award winning single "Just the Way You Are" for Bruno Mars debut album Doo-Wops & Hooligans.

In 2013, Cassius launched the Independent Publishing Company, Vinyl Crown. The company signed producer Darius "Phonix" Barnes to the publishing imprint & holds such copyrights as Trey Songz "Fumble", Fabolous' "We Good" ft. Rich Homie Quan as well as J. Cole's top single off his 2014 Forest Hills Release "No Role Modelz".

In November of 2018, Cassius launched a creative agency called Nyáma as a Vinyl Crown venture with a business partner and graphic designer Patso Dimitrov allowing Vinyl Crown to have an all in-house creative agency. The agency was rebranded as Thrivers Row in 2026 and operates on the historical Strivers Row block in Harlem.

Currently, Vinyl Crown operates as a Creative Infrastructure Company that partners with culture-shaping founders and creative entrepreneurs including FKi 1$t and Steven Othello.
