= Sony Masterworks =

America record label

- Sony Music Masterworks logo
- Parent company: Sony Music Entertainment (SME)
- Founded: 2006
- Genre: Classical; Classical crossover Broadway; Jazz
- Country of origin: U.S.
- Official website: www.sonymasterworks.com

Sony Music Masterworks (also known simply as Sony Masterworks) is a record label, the result of a restructuring of Sony Music's classical music division. Before the acquisition of Bertelsmann's shares in the former Sony BMG, the label was known as Sony BMG Masterworks.

The label was formed from the merger of the product lines of Sony Classical and BMG Classics (including RCA Red Seal) Its first president was Gilbert Hetherwick, from January 2005 through November 2006, displacing Peter Gelb who was the head of Sony Classical before the merger. Hetherwick claimed (as of 2005) the label may reissue between one hundred and two hundred historical recordings per year. Hetherwick left in November 2006, to be replaced by Alex Miller, a former BMG Employee.

The label owns rights to famous recordings originally issued by the Victor Talking Machine Company/RCA Victor dating from the early to mid 20th century, by artists such as Enrico Caruso, Arturo Toscanini, Sergei Rachmaninoff, Leopold Stokowski, Mario Lanza, Fritz Reiner, Artur Rubinstein, Fritz Kreisler, Jascha Heifetz, Vladimir Horowitz, Eugene Ormandy and Van Cliburn as well as from more recent performers such as Yo-Yo Ma, and Joshua Bell. It is also responsible for Sony BMG's immense archives of film scores (including Star Wars, The Phantom of the Opera, Memoirs of a Geisha among others). Sony Masterworks maintains the archive of theater soundtracks, via its Masterworks Broadway imprint. It issues jazz recordings through its Okeh Records imprint. Sony Masterworks also handles the Portrait Records and Flying Buddha Records imprints. In July 2019, Masterworks acquired the soundtrack label Milan Records.

The merged label's name echoes the moniker used by Sony Classical's predecessor, Columbia Masterworks (later CBS Masterworks). The name was changed when CBS sold its records division to Sony in 1988. Sony Masterworks has several imprints, used for newer recordings on its own imprints, and compilations and reissues for releases in conjunction with Legacy Recordings.

In November 2022, it was announced Sony Music Masterworks had acquired a majority stake in the Dubai-based concert promotion, talent management, events and production company MAC Global.

== See also ==
- List of record labels
