= Wanya Morris =

American singer (born 1973)

Wanyá Morris
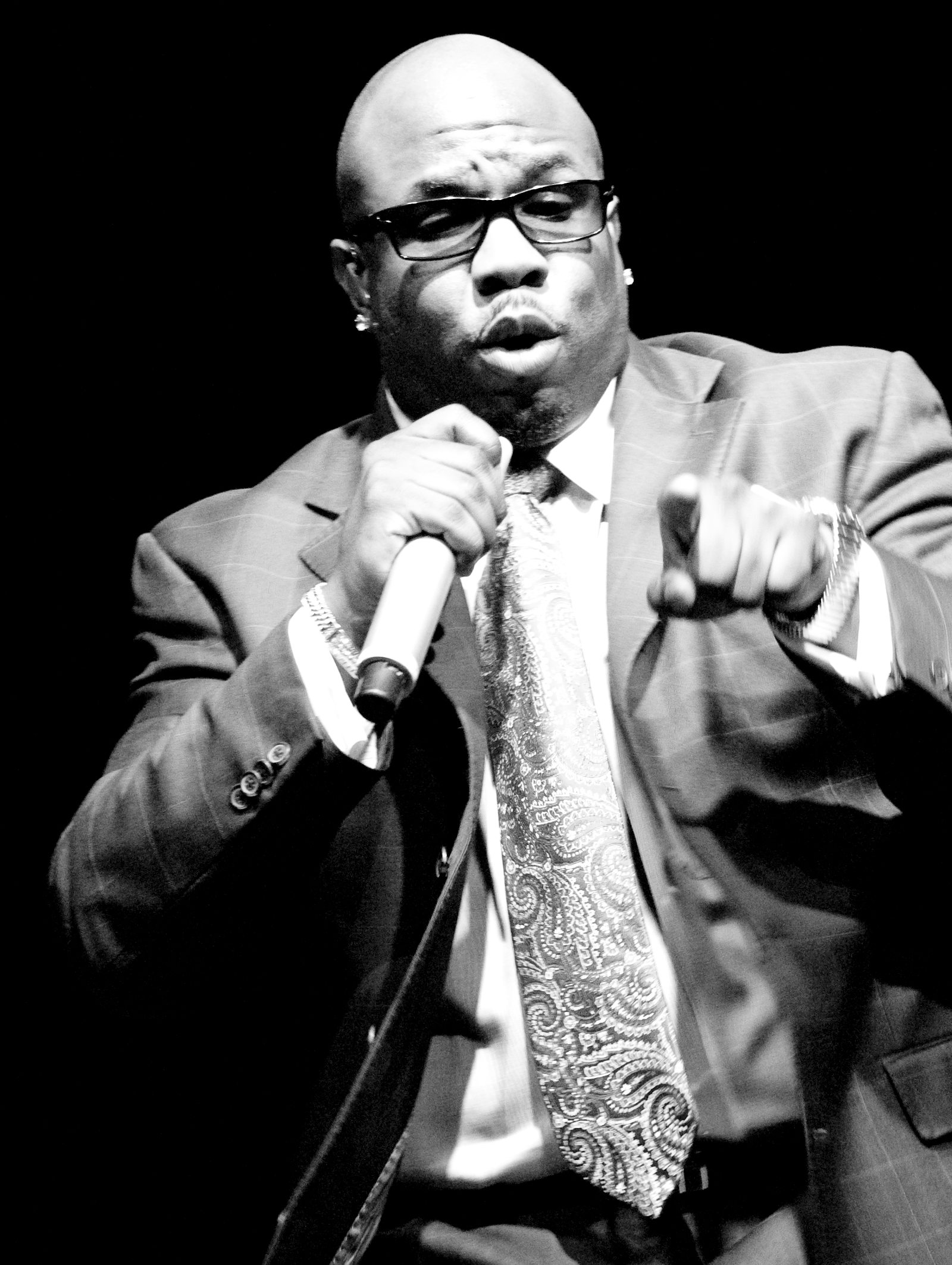
- Morris performing in 2008

Background information
- Also known as: Squirt (Note: According to the Cooleyhighharmony liner notes, each member identifies with a unique nickname, devised from a collaboration with Michael Bivins. Wanyá was "Squirt," Shawn was "Slim," Michael was simply "Bass," and Nathan assumed the name "Alex Vanderpool".)
- Born: Wanyá Jermaine Morris; July 29, 1973 (age 53); Philadelphia, Pennsylvania, U.S.
- Genres: R&B; soul; pop; new jack swing
- Occupation: Singer
- Instrument: Vocals
- Years active: 1988–present
- Labels: Motown; Universal; Arista; MSM; Koch; Decca; UMG
- Member of: Boyz II Men
- Spouses: Traci Nash (m. 2002; div. 2023); Amber Reyes (m. 2019)
- Website: boyziimen.com

Wanyá "Squirt" Morris (/ˈwɑːnjeɪ/ WAHN-yay) (born July 29, 1973) is an American singer, best known as a member of the R&B group Boyz II Men.

Morris attended William Levering Elementary School in Roxborough, Philadelphia, and the Philadelphia High School for the Creative and Performing Arts (CAPA).

Among other television appearances, he competed during the twenty-second season of Dancing with the Stars.

== Early life ==
Wanyá Jermaine Morris was born on July 29, 1973.

== Boyz II Men ==
In 1987, Morris, who sang in the school's choir along with the members of Boyz II Men (then called Unique Attraction), joined the group and became a permanent member as a freshman. After signing to Motown in 1991, they released their debut album, Cooleyhighharmony. Boyz II Men would quickly start to climb music charts with songs such as "I'll Make Love to You" (1994) and "Water Runs Dry" (1995). In 1996, the group released the single "One Sweet Day" with Mariah Carey.

Shortly after the success of "I'll Make Love to You", Morris appeared in the group Black Men United, performing with Boyz II Men for the single "U Will Know" (1994). The song was originally featured on the Jason's Lyric soundtrack, written by future neo soul musician D'Angelo and produced by Brian McKnight.

Boyz II Men are best known for their vocal harmonies. Morris sings tenor vocals in the group. He still tours with Boyz II Men as of 2025.

== Television and film ==
Morris was announced as one of the celebrities who would compete on season 22 of Dancing with the Stars on March 8, 2016. He was partnered with professional dancer Lindsay Arnold. Morris and Arnold made it to the semifinals of the show, but were then eliminated and finished the competition in fourth place overall, despite having the highest accumulative average at the time of their elimination.

Additional television and film appearances include: the music documentary film Happy on the Ground (2013), The Odd Couple (2016), Whose Line is it Anyway? (2017), Hollywood Darlings (2017), To Tell the Truth (2017), Long Shot (2019) and Celebrity Wheel of Fortune (2021), among others.

Morris appeared in the Christmas special, A Very Boy Band Holiday, in December 2021. In March 2022, he performed during I Can See Your Voice.

In September 2024, Morris appeared on an episode of Pawn Stars, in which he was asked to authenticate a vinyl copy of Cooleyhighharmony that was signed by the band, as well as a sheepskin jacket that was worn by Michael McCary on the album's cover.

== Personal life ==
Morris was in a professional and romantic relationship with Brandy Norwood during the 1990s, while she was a minor. Morris married Traci Nash in May 2002. They had six children together, including four sons who are in a R&B boy band called WanMor, and two daughters (their eldest born in November 1999). Morris and Nash separated in 2019, after an affair with Amber Reyes contributed to the split. That same year, Morris had a marriage ceremony with Reyes while still legally married to Traci Morris. Celebrities such as Floyd Mayweather Jr. and Boyz II Men member Shawn Stockman attended the wedding. Wanya was not officially divorced from Traci until June 26, 2023.

== Discography ==
=== Boyz II Men ===
==== Albums ====
Title	Album details
Cooleyhighharmony	Released: April 30, 1991; Label: Motown; Format: LP, CD, cassette
Christmas Interpretations	Released: October 5, 1993; Label: Motown; Format: LP, CD, cassette
II	Released: August 30, 1994; Label: Motown; Format: LP, CD, cassette
Evolution	Released: September 23, 1997; Label: Motown; Format: LP, CD, cassette
Nathan Michael Shawn Wanya	Released: September 12, 2000; Label: Universal; Format: CD, cassette
Full Circle	Released: June 11, 2002; Label: Arista; Format: CD, cassette
Throwback, Vol. 1	Released: August 24, 2004; Label: Koch, MSM; Format: CD, digital download
Winter/Reflections	Released: December 1, 2005; Label: MSM, Urban; Format: CD, digital download
The Remedy	Released: October 25, 2006; Label: Koch, MSM; Format: CD, digital download
Motown: A Journey Through Hitsville USA	Released: November 13, 2007; Label: Decca; Format: CD, digital download
Love	Released: November 24, 2009; Label: Decca; Format: CD, digital download
Covered: Winter	Released: December 22, 2010; Label: MSM, Rhythm Zone; Format: CD, digital download
Twenty	Released: October 25, 2011; Label: MSM, Benchmark; Format: CD, digital download
Collide	Released: October 21, 2014; Label: BMG, MSM; Format: CD, digital download
Under the Streetlight	Released: October 20, 2017; Label: Tango, MasterWorks, MSM; Format: CD, digital download

==== Singles ====
Year	Single
1991	"Motownphilly"
1991	"It's So Hard to Say Goodbye to Yesterday"
1991	"Uhh Ahh"
1992	"Please Don't Go"
1992	"End of the Road"
1993	"In the Still of the Nite (I'll Remember)"
1993	"Let It Snow" (featuring Brian McKnight)
1994	"I'll Make Love to You"
1994	"On Bended Knee"
1995	"Thank You"
1995	"Water Runs Dry"
1995	"Vibin'"
1995	"I Remember"
1997	"4 Seasons of Loneliness"
1997	"A Song for Mama"
1998	"Can't Let Her Go"
1998	"Doin' Just Fine"
1998	"I Will Get There"
2000	"Pass You By"
2000	"Thank You in Advance"
2002	"The Color of Love"
2002	"Relax Your Mind" (featuring Faith Evans)
2004	"What You Won't Do for Love"
2007	"The Tracks of My Tears"
2008	"Just My Imagination (Running Away with Me)"
2008	"War"
2008	"Mercy Mercy Me"
2009	"I Can't Make You Love Me"
2009	"Iris"
2011	"More Than You'll Ever Know" (featuring Charlie Wilson)
2011	"One Up for Love"
2011	"Flow"
2012	"One More Dance"
2014	"Better Half"
2014	"Diamond Eyes"
2014	"Losing Sleep"
2017	"Ladies Man"

=== Other works ===
==== Singles ====
- "Brokenhearted" with Brandy from Brandy (1994)
- "I'll Be There" with Mariah Carey from Fantasy: Mariah Carey at Madison Square Garden (1995)
- "Let It Out" with Lisa "Left Eye" Lopes from Eye Legacy (2009)

==== Unofficial solo projects ====
- Millennium Renaissance (compilation) (2000)
- Unreleased (mixtape) (2007)

==== Other appearances ====
- "Come for More" (song from Uninvited Guest film as Mo) (2001)
- "Happy in Hell" (song with Colt Ford from Declaration of Independence album) (2012)
- "Blow My Load" (song with Tyler the Creator, Dâm-Funk and Syd from Cherry Bomb album) (2015)
- The After Party (band with NSYNC’s Joey Fatone and AJ McLean & Nick Carter of Backstreet Boys) (2021)
