= Nathan Morris =

American singer (born 1971)

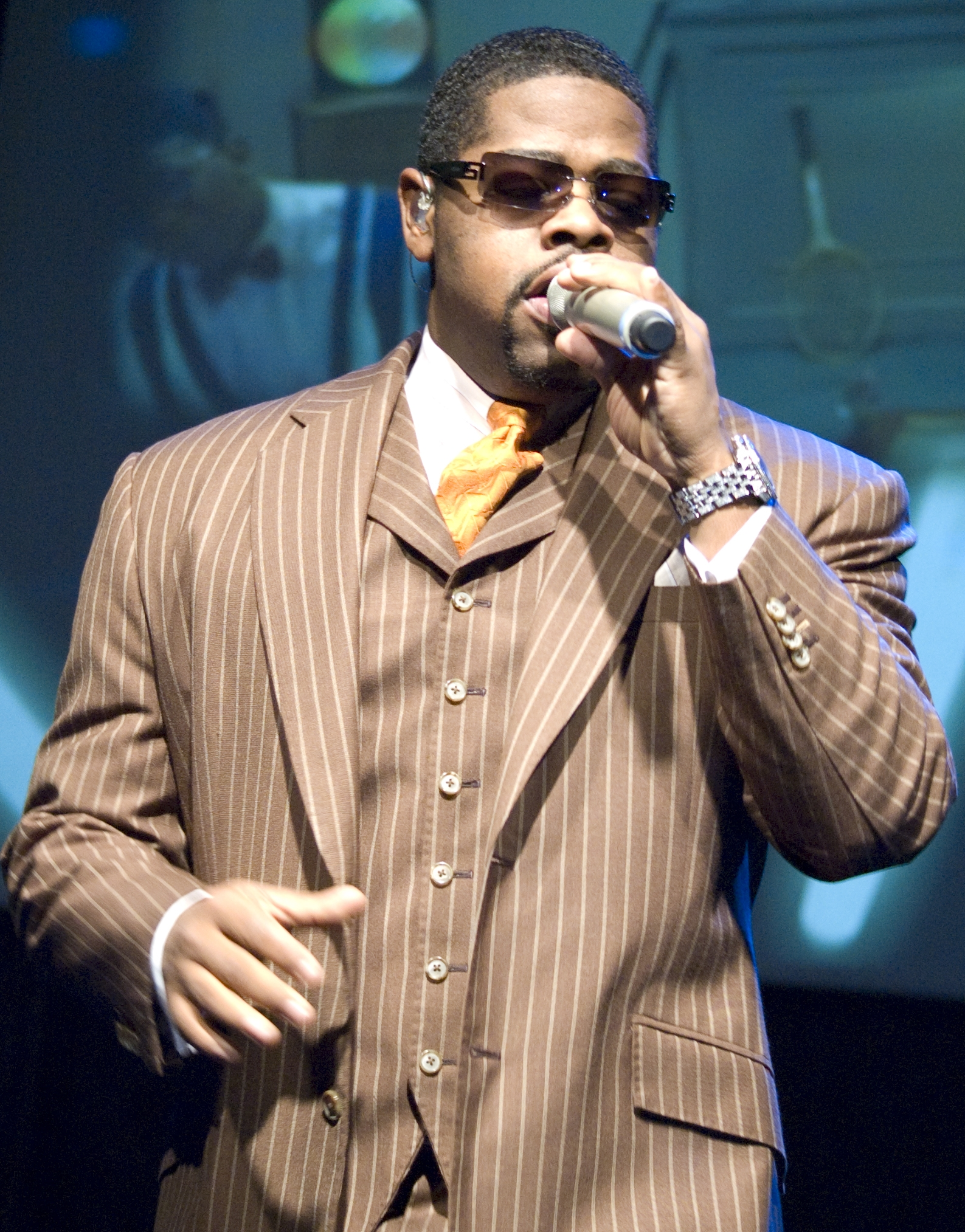
- Morris performing in 2008

Background information
- Also known as: Alex Vanderpool (Note: According to the Cooleyhighharmony liner notes, each member identifies with a unique nickname, devised from a collaboration with Michael Bivins. Wanyá was "Squirt," Shawn was "Slim," Michael was simply "Bass," and Nathan assumed the name "Alex Vanderpool".)
- Born: June 18, 1971 (age 55); Philadelphia, Pennsylvania, U.S.
- Genres: R&B; soul; pop; new jack swing
- Occupations: Singer; businessman
- Instruments: Vocals; bass guitar; keyboards; trumpet
- Years active: 1988–present
- Labels: Motown; Universal; Arista; MSM; Koch; Decca; UMG
- Member of: Boyz II Men
- Website: boyziimen.com

Nathan Bartholomew Morris (born June 18, 1971) is an American singer, businessman, and a founding member of the vocal group Boyz II Men.

In 2018, Morris was the host of the show Hit Properties on the DIY Network where he bought and renovated a multi-million dollar home. The show ran between October 6 to October 27 2018, for one season and four episodes.

== Boyz II Men discography ==
=== Albums ===
Title	Album details
Cooleyhighharmony	Released: April 30, 1991; Label: Motown; Format: LP, CD, cassette
Christmas Interpretations	Released: October 5, 1993; Label: Motown; Format: LP, CD, cassette
II	Released: August 30, 1994; Label: Motown; Format: LP, CD, cassette
Evolution	Released: September 23, 1997; Label: Motown; Format: LP, CD, cassette
Nathan Michael Shawn Wanya	Released: September 12, 2000; Label: Universal; Format: CD, cassette
Full Circle	Released: June 11, 2002; Label: Arista; Format: CD, cassette
Throwback, Vol. 1	Released: August 24, 2004; Label: Koch, MSM; Format: CD, digital download
Winter/Reflections	Released: December 1, 2005; Label: MSM, Urban; Format: CD, digital download
The Remedy	Released: October 25, 2006; Label: Koch, MSM; Format: CD, digital download
Motown: A Journey Through Hitsville USA	Released: November 13, 2007; Label: Decca; Format: CD, digital download
Love	Released: November 24, 2009; Label: Decca; Format: CD, digital download
Covered: Winter	Released: December 22, 2010; Label: MSM, Rhythm Zone; Format: CD, digital download
Twenty	Released: October 25, 2011; Label: MSM, Benchmark; Format: CD, digital download
Collide	Released: October 21, 2014; Label: BMG, MSM; Format: CD, digital download
Under the Streetlight	Released: October 20, 2017; Label: Tango, MasterWorks, MSM; Format: CD, digital download

=== Singles ===
Year	Single
1991	"Motownphilly"
1991	"It's So Hard to Say Goodbye to Yesterday"
1991	"Uhh Ahh"
1992	"Please Don't Go"
1992	"End of the Road"
1993	"In the Still of the Nite (I'll Remember)"
1993	"Let It Snow" (featuring Brian McKnight)
1994	"I'll Make Love to You"
1994	"On Bended Knee"
1995	"Thank You"
1995	"Water Runs Dry"
1995	"Vibin'"
1995	"I Remember"
1997	"4 Seasons of Loneliness"
1997	"A Song for Mama"
1998	"Can't Let Her Go"
1998	"Doin' Just Fine"
1998	"I Will Get There"
2000	"Pass You By"
2000	"Thank You in Advance"
2002	"The Color of Love"
2002	"Relax Your Mind" (featuring Faith Evans)
2004	"What You Won't Do for Love"
2007	"The Tracks of My Tears"
2008	"Just My Imagination (Running Away with Me)"
2008	"War"
2008	"Mercy Mercy Me"
2009	"I Can't Make You Love Me"
2009	"Iris"
2011	"More Than You'll Ever Know" (featuring Charlie Wilson)
2011	"One Up for Love"
2011	"Flow"
2012	"One More Dance"
2014	"Better Half"
2014	"Diamond Eyes"
2014	"Losing Sleep"
2017	"Ladies Man"
