= Saint Bernadette Catholic School =

Defunct school in Connecticut, United States

Coordinates: 41.2696°N 72.8959°W

Saint Bernadette School is a private, Catholic elementary school in New Haven, Connecticut, USA. It was founded in 1956 and is merged with Saint Bernadette Catholic Church. It provides education for ages 3–14 and usually stays within 150-200 children in the school. The current principal is Edward Goad.

== Recognition ==
The hit song "In the Still of the Night" by The Five Satins was recorded in the school basement in 1956.
