= Uhh Ahh =

Single by Boyz II Men

from the album Cooleyhighharmony
- B-side: "Uhh Ahh" (Acapella)
- Released: November 26, 1991
- Recorded: 1990
- Genre: R&B
- Length: 3:50
- Label: Motown
- Songwriters: Nathan Morris; Wanya Morris; Michael Bivins
- Producer: Dallas Austin

Boyz II Men singles chronology
"It's So Hard to Say Goodbye to Yesterday" (1991)	"Uhh Ahh" (1991)	"Please Don't Go" (1992)

"Uhh Ahh" is the title of a number-one R&B single by group Boyz II Men. The song was written by Michael Bivins, Nathan Morris and Wanya Morris.

The song was released as the third single from the group's debut album, Cooleyhighharmony, in 1991 in the United States.

"Uhh Ahh" was another hit for the group, peaking at #16 on the Billboard Hot 100 on March 7, 1992, although it was their first single to miss the Top 10. However, the song was a big success on the Billboard Hot R&B/Hip-Hop Singles & Tracks peaking at #1, becoming the group's second #1 single on the chart. The song also peaked at #19 on the Hot 100 Airplay and #14 on the Hot 100 Singles Sales on the same week it peaked at #16 on the Hot 100.

The beginning of the song was sampled in Beyoncé's single "Countdown".

== Track listings ==
US Single

- A1 Uhh Ahh (Remix Version)
- A2 Uhh Ahh (Sequel Version W/French Girl)
- A3 It's So Hard To Say Goodbye To Yesterday (Dedication Version)
- B1 Acappella (Sequel Version W/French Girl)
- B2 Acappella (Remix Version)

US 12", Promo

- A1 Uhh Ahh (Radio Edit) (Sequel Version)
- A2 Uhh Ahh (LP Version)
- A3 Uhh Ahh (Sequel Version W/French Girl)
- A4 Uhh Ahh (Remix Version)
- B1 Uhh Ahh (Pop Version)
- B2 Uhh Ahh (Acappella) (Sequel Version)
- B3 Uhh Ahh (Acappella) (Sequel Version W/French Girl)

Germany Vinyl, 7"

- A Uhh Ahh (LP Version) 3:50
- B Uhh Ahh (Instrumental) 3:33

Germany Maxi-CD

1. Uhh Ahh (Remix, Radio Edit) (Sequel Version) 4:13
2. Uhh Ahh (Remix) 4:50
3. Uhh Ahh (Remix, Pop Version) 4:06
4. Uhh Ahh (Remix, Sequel Version With French Girl) 4:50

== Charts ==
=== Weekly charts ===
Chart (1991–92)	Peak position
Australia ARIA)	180
Canada Retail Singles (The Record)	8
Israel (Israeli Singles Chart)	32
US Billboard Hot 100	16
US Hot R&B/Hip-Hop Songs (Billboard)	1
US Cash Box Top 100	30

=== Year-end charts ===
Chart (1992)	Position
US Billboard Hot 100	84
US Hot R&B/Hip-Hop Songs (Billboard)	16

== See also ==
- List of number-one R&B singles of 1992 (U.S.)
