= Cooleyhighharmony =

Studio album by Boyz II Men
- Released: April 30, 1991
- Studios: Doppler, Atlanta, Georgia; Studio 4, Philadelphia, Pennsylvania and Soundworks, New York City
- Genres: R&B; new jack swing
- Length: 40:25
- Language: English
- Label: Motown
- Producers: Dallas Austin; the Characters

Boyz II Men chronology
Cooleyhighharmony (1991)	Christmas Interpretations (1993)

Singles from Cooleyhighharmony
- 1. "Motownphilly" Released: April 1991; 2. "It's So Hard to Say Goodbye to Yesterday" Released: August 20, 1991; 3. "Uhh Ahh" Released: November 26, 1991; 4. "Please Don't Go" Released: March 17, 1992

Alternate covers
- 1993 reissue cover

Singles from Cooleyhighharmony (Reissue)
- 1. "End of the Road" Released: June 30, 1992; 2. "In the Still of the Night (I'll Remember)" Released: November 10, 1992

Cooleyhighharmony is the debut studio album by American R&B group Boyz II Men. It was released on April 30, 1991, by Motown Records. Following their discovery by New Edition's Michael Bivins in 1989, the group recorded the album as a quartet after Marc Nelson's departure. It blended New Jack Swing with classic soul and doo-wop-inspired harmonies, a style described as "hip hop doo-wop," with production largely overseen by Dallas Austin and additional production from Troy Taylor and Charles Farrar of The Characters. Primarily written by its band members, Cooleyhighharmony's title pays tribute to the real-life Chicago high school, Cooley Vocational High School.

The album received generally positive reviews, with critics praising Boyz II Men's harmonies, timeless ballads, and blend of doo-wop, soul, and New Jack Swing, though some found its slower material routine and its faster tracks less suited to the group. Cooleyhighharmony was a major commercial success, reaching the top 10 in the United States, United Kingdom, Australia, and New Zealand, and peaking at number three on the Billboard 200 and number one on the Top R&B/Hip-Hop Albums chart. It was certified nine-times platinum by the Recording Industry Association of America (RIAA) and achieved multi-platinum or gold status in several other countries, with domestic sales approaching seven million copies.

Cooleyhighharmony's original edition produced two US top-five singles, including "Motownphilly" and "It's So Hard to Say Goodbye to Yesterday." Following the album's international reissue in 1992, which added remixes and two new tracks, "End of the Road", became a major international breakthrough for the group. Originally recorded for the Boomerang soundtrack, the song propelled Boyz II Men to global prominence and was joined on the reissue by "In the Still of the Nite (I'll Remember)," originally recorded for the television miniseries The Jacksons: An American Dream. A two-disc digitally remastered edition was released in 2009, featuring additional remixes and two previously unreleased tracks.

== Background ==
Boyz II Men formed in the mid-1980s at the Philadelphia High School for the Creative and Performing Arts, initially under the name Unique Attraction. The group eventually settled on a five-member lineup of Nathan Morris, Wanya Morris, Shawn Stockman, Michael McCary, and Marc Nelson, drawing heavily on the influence of New Edition. In 1989, the group met New Edition member Michael Bivins backstage at a Philadelphia concert and impressed him with an impromptu a cappella performance, leading Bivins to become their manager and help secure a deal with Motown Records. Nelson later departed before the recording of the group's debut album, leaving Boyz II Men as a quartet. For their debut album with Motown, the band combined New Jack Swing production with classic soul and doo-wop-inspired harmonies, a style that became known as "hip hop doo-wop" and established the group's distinctive multi-lead vocal approach. Production of the songs was largely overseen by producer Dallas Austin, with additional production from Troy Taylor and Charles Farrar of duo The Characters.

== Critical reception ==
Professional ratings
Review scores
Source	Rating
AllMusic	4.5/5 stars
Robert Christgau	(2-star Honorable Mention)
Entertainment Weekly	B−
Los Angeles Times	3/4 stars
Record Collector	4/5 stars
The Rolling Stone Album Guide	3/5 stars
The Windsor Star	B

AllMusic editor Andy Kellman called the album "a brisk 40-minute set built for front-to-back listening, though the sequencing is more natural with the 'adagio' and 'allegro' halves switched up. For many of those responsible for its multi-platinum status, it is the album of the early '90s." Connie Johnson of The Los Angeles Times praised Cooleyhighharmony for its "silky, coming-of-age style," highlighting "Uhh Ahh" as a standout track and noting the group's appeal to younger listeners. Writing for Record Collector, Jason Draper praised the album as a "stone cold classic," highlighting its close harmonies, quiet storm influences, doo-wop touches, and new jack swing production. He criticized the bonus-disc remixes as repetitive, but maintained that the original album remained "sexy, seductive" and full of emotion.

In a mixed review, Amy Linden from Entertainment Weekly wrote: "Reversing the usual sequence, the album starts with slow jams and saves the faster jams for last, which only serves to highlight how routine the slow stuff is. Don't they know that you start the party kickin', then get down to the grinding?" Rolling Stone rated the album three out of five stars and noted that Cooleyhighharmony balanced the New Jack Swing of "Motownphilly" with nostalgic doo-wop influences, praising the group's ability to make its retro influences feel contemporary rather than simply recreating the past. In a retrospective reviews, Billboard praised the album for helping pioneer the sound of 1990s R&B and highlighted Boyz II Men's "timeless ballads" and vocal talent, while criticizing the album's New Jack Swing material as less suited to the group.

== Commercial performance ==
Cooleyhighharmony was a major commercial success, charting in several countries and reaching the top 10 in Australia, New Zealand, the United Kingdom, and the United States. On the US Billboard 200, the album debuted at number 58 before eventually peaking at number three. It reached number one on the Top R&B/Hip-Hop Albums chart, with domestic sales approaching seven million copies. It also peaked at number four on both the Australian Albums Chart and the New Zealand Albums Chart, number seven on the UK Albums Chart, and number 11 on the Canadian Albums Chart. Elsewhere, it reached the top 20 in the Netherlands and the top 40 in Austria, Germany, Sweden, and on a composite European Albums Chart. The album also peaked at number 91 in Japan.

In the United States, Cooleyhighharmony ranked at number 12 on the Billboard 200 year-end chart for 1992 and number 10 on the year-end Top R&B/Hip-Hop Albums chart. Following its continued success, it was also the 45th-highest-charting album on the Billboard 200 decade-end chart for the 1990s. The album received multiple certifications internationally. It was certified nine-times platinum by the Recording Industry Association of America (RIAA), representing 9 million certified units in the United States. It was certified double platinum by the Australian Recording Industry Association (ARIA), platinum by Music Canada and the Recording Industry Association of New Zealand (RMNZ), and gold by the British Phonographic Industry (BPI) and the Recording Industry Association of Japan (RIAJ). In Asia, the album was reported to have sold 700,000 copies.

== Track listing ==
=== Original 1991 edition ===
No.	Title	Writer(s)	Producer(s)	Length
1.	"Please Don't Go"	Nathan Morris	Dallas Austin	4:26
2.	"Lonely Heart"	N. Morris	Austin	3:42
3.	"This Is My Heart"	Wanya Morris; Shawn Stockman	Austin	3:23
4.	"Uhh Ahh"	N. Morris; W. Morris; Michael Bivins	Austin	3:51
5.	"It's So Hard to Say Goodbye to Yesterday"	Freddie Perren; Christine Yarian	Austin	2:51
6.	"Motownphilly"	Austin; Bivins; N. Morris; Stockman	Austin	3:55
7.	"Under Pressure"	Austin; N. Morris	Austin	4:13
8.	"Sympin'"	N. Morris; Stockman; Austin	Austin	4:23
9.	"Little Things"	Troy Taylor	The Characters	4:01
10.	"Your Love"	Taylor	The Characters	5:50
Total length:				40:25

=== 1993 US reissue ===
No.	Title	Writer(s)	Producer(s)	Length
1.	"Al Final del Camino"	Babyface; Antonio "L.A." Reid; Daryl Simmons	K. C. Porter	5:51
2.	"Please Don't Go"	N. Morris	Austin	4:26
3.	"Lonely Heart"	N. Morris	Austin	3:42
4.	"This Is My Heart"	W. Morris; Stockman	Austin	3:23
5.	"Uhh Ahh" (sequel version)	N. Morris; W. Morris; Michael Bivins	Boyz II Men; Fred Jenkins	4:15
6.	"It's So Hard to Say Goodbye to Yesterday"	Perren; Yarian	Austin	2:48
7.	"In the Still of the Night (I'll Remember)"	Parris	Boyz II Men	2:51
8.	"Motownphilly" (remix – radio edit)	Austin; Bivins; N. Morris; Stockman	Camille Hinds; Steve Jervier; Paul Jervier	3:59
9.	"Under Pressure"	Austin; N. Morris	Austin	4:13
10.	"Sympin'" (remix – radio edit)	Austin; N. Morris; Stockman; Bivins; W. Morris	Rico Anderson	3:59
11.	"Little Things"	Taylor	The Characters	4:01
12.	"Your Love"	Taylor	The Characters	5:50
13.	"Motownphilly" (original album version)	Austin; N. Morris; Stockman; Bivins	Austin	3:55
14.	"Sympin'" (original album version)	Austin; N. Morris; Stockman	Austin	4:23
15.	"Uhh Ahh" (original album version)	N. Morris; Bivins; W. Morris	Austin	3:51
16.	"It's So Hard to Say Goodbye to Yesterday" (Radio Version)	Perren; Yarian	Rex Salas; Boyz II Men	3:06
17.	"End of the Road"	Reid; Babyface; Simmons	Reid; Babyface; Simmons	5:50
Total length:				64:23

=== 2009 re-release ===
In 2009, a two-disc digitally remastered special edition of the album was released by Hip-O Select Records. It contains the 1993 reissue version of the album, plus additional remixes and two previously unreleased tracks.

Disc 1
No.	Title	Length
1.	"Please Don't Go"	4:26
2.	"Lonely Heart"	3:42
3.	"This Is My Heart"	3:23
4.	"Uhh Ahh"	3:51
5.	"It's So Hard to Say Goodbye to Yesterday"	2:51
6.	"Motownphilly"	3:55
7.	"Under Pressure"	4:13
8.	"Sympin'"	4:23
9.	"Little Things"	4:01
10.	"Your Love"	5:50
11.	"End of the Road"	5:50
12.	"In the Still of the Night (I'll Remember)"	2:51
13.	"Uhh Ahh" (sequel version)	4:15
14.	"Motownphilly" (remix – radio edit)	3:59
15.	"Sympin'" (remix – radio edit)	3:59
16.	"It's So Hard to Say Goodbye to Yesterday" (radio version)	3:06
17.	"Al Final del Camino" ("End of the Road" Spanish version)	5:51

Disc 2
No.	Title	Writer(s)	Producer(s)	Length
1.	"Just a Cover" (previously unreleased)	Taylor	The Characters	5:24
2.	"Can't Be Liked" (previously unreleased)	Taylor	The Characters	5:50
3.	"Motownphilly" (12" version)			5:39
4.	"Motownphilly" (12" dub)			4:09
5.	"Motownphilly" (Quiet Storm Mix)			4:06
6.	"Under Pressure" (Groovy Remix) (previously unreleased in the US)	Austin; N. Morris	Austin	6:23
7.	"Under Pressure" (extended remix) (previously unreleased in the US)	Austin; N. Morris	Austin	6:32
8.	"Sympin'" (Remix)			5:00
9.	"Sympin'" (remix – radio edit without rap)			4:17
10.	"Uhh Ahh" (remix)			4:50
11.	"Uhh Ahh" (sequel version – with French girl)			4:50
12.	"Uhh Ahh" (sequel version – a cappella)			4:50
13.	"It's So Hard to Say Goodbye to Yesterday" (gospel version with dedication)			4:15

== Personnel ==
Credits adapted from the liner notes of Cooleyhighharmony.

Technical

- Vida Sparks
- Dallas Austin
- Michael Bivins
- Jheryl Busby
- Dave Way
- Dennis Mitchell
- Darin Prindle
- Chris Trevett
- Steve Schwartzberg
- Jim "Jiff" Hinger
- Mark Partis

Additional personnel

- Mastering: Chris Bellman
- Mastering location: Bernie Grundman Mastering
- Creative director: Michael Bivins
- Art director: Stephen Meltzer
- Design: Kaie Wellman
- Assistant designer: Elizabeth Matbeny
- Assistant: Darrale Jones
- Administrative assistant: Dianne Johnson
- Photography: Butch Belaire
- Hair and make-up: Helene Andersson
- Stylist: Agnes Baddoo

Mixing locations

- Soundworks Studio, New York City
- Soundtract Studio, New York City
- Doppler Studios, Atlanta, Georgia

== Charts ==
=== Weekly charts ===
Weekly chart performance for Cooleyhighharmony
Chart (1991–1993)	Peak position
Australian Albums (ARIA)	4
Austrian Albums (Ö3 Austria)	39
Canadian Albums (RPM)	11
Dutch Albums (Album Top 100)	16
European Albums Chart (Billboard)	30
German Albums (Offizielle Top 100)	38
Japanese Albums (Oricon)	91
New Zealand Albums (RMNZ)	4
Swedish Albums (Sverigetopplistan)	35
UK Albums (Official Charts)	7
US Billboard 200	3
US Top R&B/Hip-Hop Albums (Billboard)	1
Zimbabwe Albums (ZIMA)	3

=== Year-end charts ===
1992 year-end chart performance for Cooleyhighharmony
Chart (1992)	Position
US Billboard 200	12
US Top R&B/Hip-Hop Albums (Billboard)	10

19933 year-end chart performance for Cooleyhighharmony
Chart (1993)	Position
New Zealand Albums (RMNZ)	15
US Billboard 200	53
US Top R&B/Hip-Hop Albums (Billboard)	43

=== Decade-end charts ===
Decade-end chart performance for Cooleyhighharmony
Chart (1990–1999)	Position
US Billboard 200	45

== Certifications and sales ==
Certifications and sales for Cooleyhighharmony
Region	Certification	Certified units/sales
Australia (ARIA)	2× Platinum	140,000^{^}
Canada (Music Canada)	Platinum	100,000^{^}
Japan (RIAJ)	Gold	100,000^{^}
New Zealand (RMNZ)	Platinum	15,000^{^}
United Kingdom (BPI)	Gold	100,000^{^}
United States (RIAA)	9× Platinum	9,000,000^{^}
Summaries
Asia	—	700,000
^{^} Shipments figures based on certification alone.

== Release history ==
Cooleyhighharmony release history
Region	Date	Format	Label	Edition(s)
United States	April 30, 1991	CD; cassette; vinyl	Motown	Standard
United States	November 16, 1993	CD; cassette; vinyl	Motown	US reissue
United States	May 26, 2009	CD; cassette; vinyl	Motown	Expanded

== See also ==
- List of number-one R&B albums of 1991 (U.S.)
