= Boyz II Men =

American vocal group

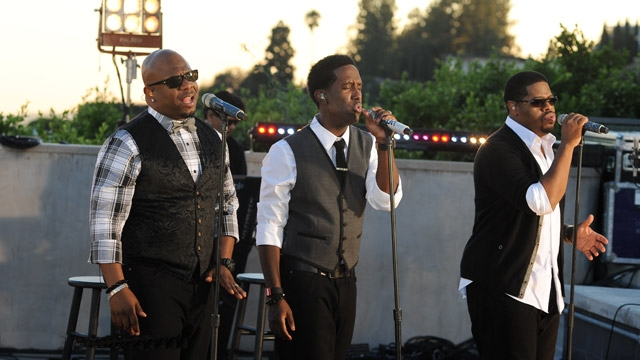
- Boyz II Men performing in 2011

Background information
- Also known as: Unique Attraction (1985–88)
- Origin: Philadelphia, Pennsylvania, United States
- Genres: R&B; pop; soul; new jack swing
- Works: Boyz II Men discography
- Years active: 1985–present
- Labels: Motown; Universal; Arista; MSM; Koch; Decca
- Members: Nathan Morris; Shawn Stockman; Wanyá Morris
- Past members: Marc Nelson; Michael McCary

Boyz II Men (Note: Pronounced /ˌbɔɪz tə ˈmɛn/ BOYZ tə MEN, like "boys to men") are an American vocal harmony group from Philadelphia, Pennsylvania. Originally formed in 1985, they are currently a trio composed of baritone Nathan Morris, tenor Wanyá Morris, and tenor Shawn Stockman. Previously, Boyz II Men was a quartet including bass singer Michael McCary, who left the group in 2003 due to health issues.

The group first saw commercial success in 1991 with the release of their debut studio album, Cooleyhighharmony, which included the singles "Motownphilly" and "It's So Hard to Say Goodbye to Yesterday," both of which peaked within the top five of the Billboard Hot 100. Their 1992 single, "End of the Road," peaked atop the Hot 100 and set a then-record for spending thirteen weeks at the top of the chart. Boyz II Men later broke this record twice more with "I'll Make Love to You" in 1994 and "One Sweet Day" (with Mariah Carey) in 1995, which each set new records for spending the most weeks at number one. Additionally, when "On Bended Knee" took the number one spot away from "I'll Make Love to You" in 1994, Boyz II Men became only the second musical act, after The Beatles (in 1964), to replace themselves atop the Hot 100. In addition to their success on the charts, Boyz II Men received widespread critical acclaim, and they won four Grammy Awards in the 1990s. These achievements, among others, led Billboard to recognize Boyz II Men as the "biggest boy band" in a 2012 retrospective. Their work is frequently cited as influential on the R&B genre, and Boyz II Men have been listed among the greatest doo-wop vocal groups of all time.

Boyz II Men's latest studio album, Under the Streetlight, was released in 2017. They performed in concerts around the world throughout the 2010s and 2020s.

== History ==
=== 1985–1990: Group formation and beginnings ===
The group, originally named "Unique Attraction," was formed in 1985 by Nathan Morris and Marc Nelson at the Philadelphia High School for the Creative and Performing Arts (CAPA). Morris and Nelson joined with fellow schoolmates George Baldi, Jon Shoats, and Marguerite Walker to create the original lineup. Two years later, in 1987, the group added freshman Wanyá Morris (who has no blood relation to Nathan), a singer in the school choir. In 1988, Baldi, Shoats and Walker left the group upon graduating from the school. Later that year, the group added Shawn Stockman after his impressive solo performance as a fellow member of the school choir. The fifth and final member to join the group was Michael McCary, who one day in 1988 encountered Unique Attraction rehearsing in a school bathroom (because of the acoustics), when he added some bass notes. With this five-person lineup, the group began to attract many fans and significant support at their high school, where they were mentored by the renowned CAPA teacher LaDeva Davis. The group was heavily inspired by New Edition, so much so that they renamed the group as "Boyz II Men," after New Edition's hit song "Boys to Men" (from their 1988 album Heart Break).

The group soon developed a plan to sing for (and win the support of) a celebrity to quickly earn a record deal with a major label. One night in 1989, after performing at a Valentine's Day party at their high school, they snuck into a concert put on by local radio station "Power 99" at the Philadelphia Civic Center. Boyz II Men managed to talk their way into the backstage area, where they had planned to find Philadelphia celebrity Will Smith to perform for him. However, while looking for Smith, they happened to cross paths with New Edition member Michael Bivins. On the spot, they sang their a cappella rendition of New Edition's "Can You Stand the Rain" for him. Bivins and everyone else who witnessed the impromptu performance (including other celebrities) were impressed. Despite having no experience as a manager, Bivens gave the group his telephone number, and invited them to call him sometime soon. Nathan Morris took Bivens up on that invitation, calling Bivens on the telephone repeatedly. Eventually, Bivens agreed to help get Boyz II Men signed to a record contract, and to help manage the young artists.

After some time, Bivens successfully worked to get Boyz II Men signed to a major label: Motown Records. The president of Motown at the time was Jheryl Busby, who personally met with Boyz II Men and approved their initial contracts. However, it took over a year before Boyz II Men would find their way into a studio to record an album. During that time, the group worked with Bivens on several projects (including contributing vocals to songs with other Bivens-led groups like Another Bad Creation). The delay before Boyz II Men would record their own material, among other unspecified conflicts, led to the departure of founding member Marc Nelson. Nelson left Boyz II Men before the recording sessions for their debut album. Boyz II Men moved forward as the quartet that would soon find international fame: Michael McCary, Nathan Morris, Wanyá Morris, and Shawn Stockman.

=== 1991–1993: Cooleyhighharmony and "End of the Road" ===
Boyz II Men's first album, Cooleyhighharmony, was released on Motown in 1991 and was mainly produced by Dallas Austin. Cooleyhighharmony's drum-heavy new jack swing sound and multi-layered sampled backdrops were similar to that of New Edition offshoot Bell Biv DeVoe (BBD), but Boyz II Men featured classic-soul styled vocals in place of BBD's rapping and brassier singing. This style was dubbed "hip-hop doo-wop" by the group and Bivins, who presented Boyz II Men and Another Bad Creation to the public as BBD's protégés.

From the beginning, Boyz II Men featured all four members as leads, avoiding the typical R&B group arrangement of one or two lead singers and a team of background singers. The multiple-lead arrangement became a Boyz II Men trademark: Wanyá Morris' melismatic tenor, Shawn Stockman's crystal-clear falsetto, Nathan Morris' husky baritone, and Michael McCary's true bass (often featured in spoken-word sections) trading bars in each song.

The album's liner notes identified unique nicknames for each group member. These nicknames were devised in collaboration with Bivins in an attempt at marketing. Wanyá was "Squirt," Shawn was "Slim," Michael was simply "Bass," and Nathan assumed the name "Alex Vanderpool," after a soap opera character who brandished a nerdy style.

Boyz II Men's debut single, "Motownphilly," featured a rap cameo by Michael Bivins that describes how he discovered Boyz II Men. The single's release was accompanied by a music video that presented the group in hip-hop style. (The video also included cameos from fellow CAPA alumni Black Thought and Questlove of The Roots.) Cooleyhighharmony's second single was an a cappella cover of a classic Motown tune, G.C. Cameron's "It's So Hard to Say Goodbye to Yesterday" from the 1975 film Cooley High. The sensual "Uhh Ahh" served as the third single.

Cooleyhighharmony achieved remarkable commercial and critical success, selling over nine million copies and winning the Grammy Award for Best R&B Performance by a Duo or Group with Vocals at the 1992 Grammy Awards. That year, Boyz II Men were also nominated for Best New Artist, along with British singer-songwriter Seal, fellow R&B group Color Me Badd, and dance group C+C Music Factory, but the Grammy was awarded to singer-songwriter Marc Cohn.

In 1992, Boyz II Men joined MC Hammer's high-profile 2 Legit 2 Quit Tour as an opening act. While traveling the country, their tour manager Roderick 'Khalil' Rountree was murdered in Chicago, and the group's future performances of "It's So Hard to Say Goodbye to Yesterday" were dedicated to him. As a result of this unfortunate experience, the song helped advance their success.

While touring during 1992, Boyz II Men returned briefly to the studio to record the single "End of the Road," co-written and produced by Kenneth "Babyface" Edmonds, for the soundtrack to Eddie Murphy's film Boomerang. This song, released as a single on June 30, 1992, would become one of the most successful songs of the decade. It reached the number one position on the Billboard Hot 100 on August 15, remaining there for a record-setting 13 weeks, until November 14, 1992. The unprecedented success of "End of the Road" instantly transformed Boyz II Men from up-and-coming R&B stars into mainstream music celebrities.

A revamped Cooleyhighharmony was reissued during 1993, with "End of the Road" added as a special bonus track. Later, the song was also included in a collection produced by Michael Bivins, featuring his most celebrated acts, called "East Coast Family, Vol. 1". Shortly after the release of this compilation, Boyz II Men and Bivins parted ways professionally. Boyz II Men continued to work with Babyface and other high-profile record producers over the next several years.

=== 1994–1996: II and "I'll Make Love to You" ===
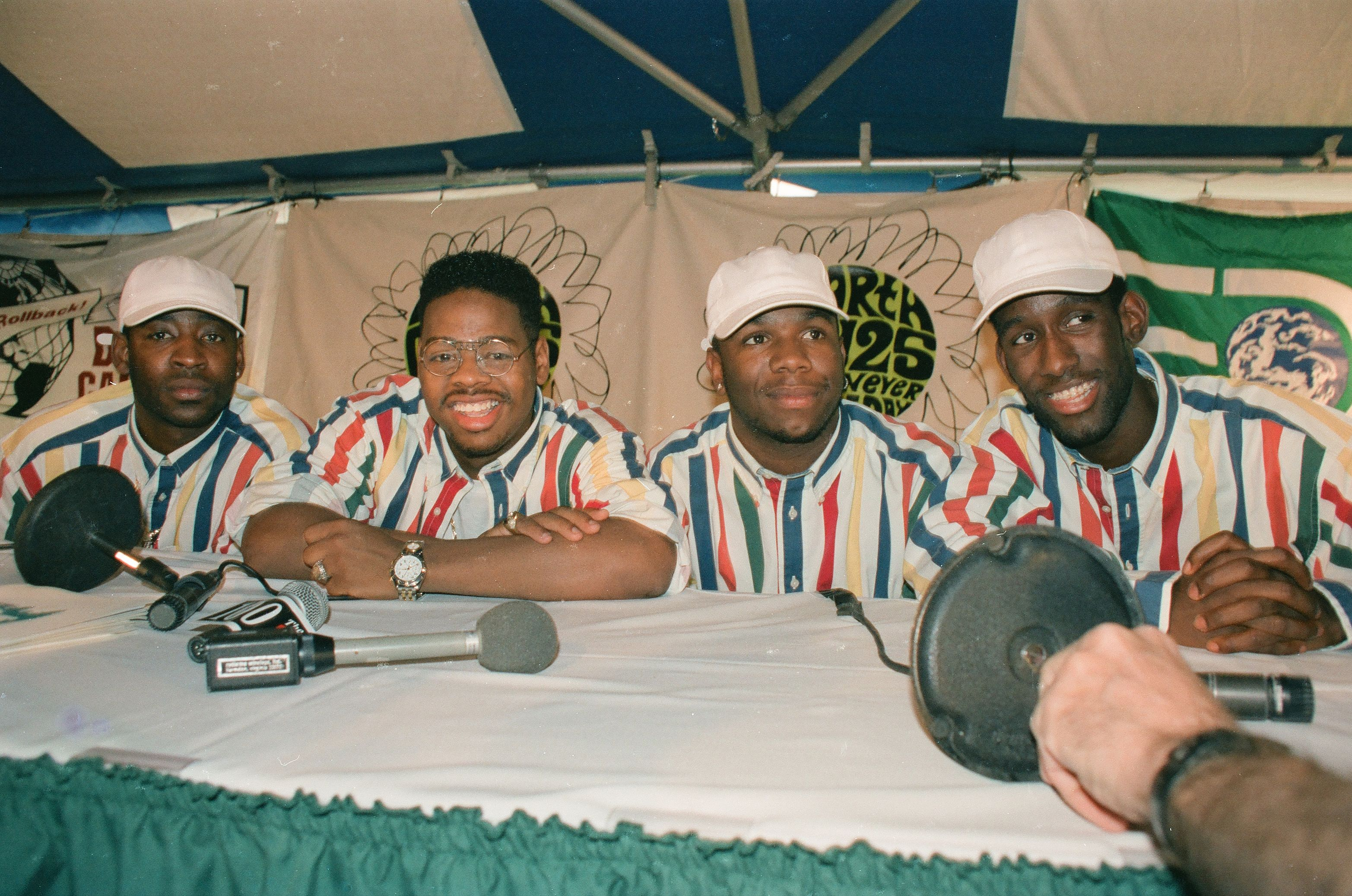
Boyz II Men in 1995

After releasing a Christmas compilation, Christmas Interpretations in 1993, Boyz II Men returned to the studio for their highly anticipated sophomore effort. In 1994, II was released. II sold more than 12 million copies in the United States alone, becoming one of the best-selling albums ever released by an R&B group act, and one of the biggest albums of the decade. II later won two awards at the 1995 Grammy Awards, including Best R&B Album.

Most of the tracks on II were written and produced by Tim & Bob—Tim Kelley and Bob Robinson (5), Babyface (2) and the successful team of Jimmy Jam and Terry Lewis (2). Several of II's tracks became major singles, among them Jam & Lewis's "On Bended Knee", and Babyface's "I'll Make Love to You" and "Water Runs Dry".

"I'll Make Love to You" broke "End of the Road's" 13-week record at number 1, by spending 14 weeks at the top of the chart (a feat equaled earlier that year by Whitney Houston's cover of "I Will Always Love You"). "On Bended Knee" replaced "I'll Make Love to You" at number 1, making Boyz II Men the second act ever to replace itself at number 1 on the Billboard Hot 100 chart after the Beatles.

In 1995, the group appeared as backing vocalists on "HIStory" from Michael Jackson's Grammy-nominated ninth album of the same name.

In 1995, Motown issued The Remix Collection, a compilation of remixes of various Boyz II Men songs from Cooleyhighharmony and II. The group itself had opposed the release of the collection because they felt the compilation did not represent Boyz II Men's best work. After the label released the album without their permission, there was a dispute between the company and the group. Boyz II Men initiated their own recording company Stonecreek (which released material by artists such as Uncle Sam), and they arranged for Stonecreek's distribution by Epic Records, not Motown.

=== 1997–1998: Evolution and label conflicts ===
Boyz II Men's third studio album, Evolution, was released during 1997 to mixed reviews and sold three million copies, far below the stratospheric success of II's (12 million copies) and Cooleyhighharmony (9 million). Only one of Evolution's singles, the Jam/Lewis-penned "Four Seasons of Loneliness", reached number 1 on the Hot 100 chart. The second single, the Babyface-helmed "A Song for Mama" (the theme song to the Babyface-produced film Soul Food,) was a Top 10 success, but the follow-up "Can't Let Her Go" underperformed.

The global tour began in 1997 to promote Evolution was successful in terms of ticket sales, but behind the scenes, Boyz II Men was wracked by conflicts, with their record label and internal conflicts among the members of the group. Making matters worse, health problems began to take their toll on the group. While on tour to support the Evolution album, Wanyá Morris developed a polyp on his vocal cords, and the group was forced to postpone part of the tour until he recovered. McCary's multiple sclerosis meant that he was unable to participate in most of the group's dance routines.

Boyz II Men were nominated for 2 Grammys in 1998: Best R&B Album for Evolution and Best R&B Vocal Performance by a Duo or Group for "A Song for Mama".

=== 1999–2001: Nathan Michael Shawn Wanya ===
In 1999, Motown's parent company, PolyGram, was bought by Universal Music Group. Amidst the major corporate restructure, Motown was merged with UMG's Universal Records, where Boyz II Men found themselves reassigned.

Their only studio LP album for Universal, 2000's Nathan Michael Shawn Wanya, was chiefly written and produced by the group itself, in an attempt to update their sound and ward off critics who questioned the group's reliance on Babyface's hit-making songcraft. While the critics were more receptive to Nathan Michael Shawn Wanya than they had been to its predecessor, the LP sold only 500,000 copies in the US, 1 million copies worldwide, and although its two singles, "Pass You By" and "Thank You in Advance," received media attention, neither became hits.

Boyz II Men departed from Universal in 2001, ending their relationship with the company that brought them to international stardom in 1991. The label released a greatest hits compilation, Legacy: The Greatest Hits Collection, to close out their contract.

=== 2002–2003: Full Circle, "The Color of Love" and Michael McCary's departure ===
Signing a new deal with Arista Records in 2002, Boyz II Men began recording the Full Circle album, and they recruited Babyface for the lead single, "The Color of Love," which was released in the summer of 2002. In an attempt to recapture the massive success the group had enjoyed a decade earlier, the album received a significant promotional budget. Arista commissioned a high-quality music video, shot in four different locales by four different directors: supervising director Little X filmed scenes featuring Michael McCary in India, Hype Williams filmed Shawn Stockman in Tokyo, Benny Boom filmed Nathan Morris in Ghana, and Chris Robinson filmed Wanyá Morris in Puerto Rico, and finally all four members were filmed in New York City. The resulting music video had a debut on BET, but failed to have a great effect, and Full Circle, like Nathan Michael Shawn Wanya before it, sold slightly more than 500,000 copies in the US and 1 million copies worldwide.

To date, Full Circle is Boyz II Men's last album as a quartet. On January 30, 2003, Michael McCary left Boyz II Men due to chronic health challenges resulting from multiple sclerosis and reported personal problems.

Arista terminated Boyz II Men's recording contract on April 30, 2003. The group continued performing and recording as a trio: Nathan Morris, Wanyá Morris, and Shawn Stockman.

=== 2004–2006: Throwback, Vol. 1 and The Remedy ===
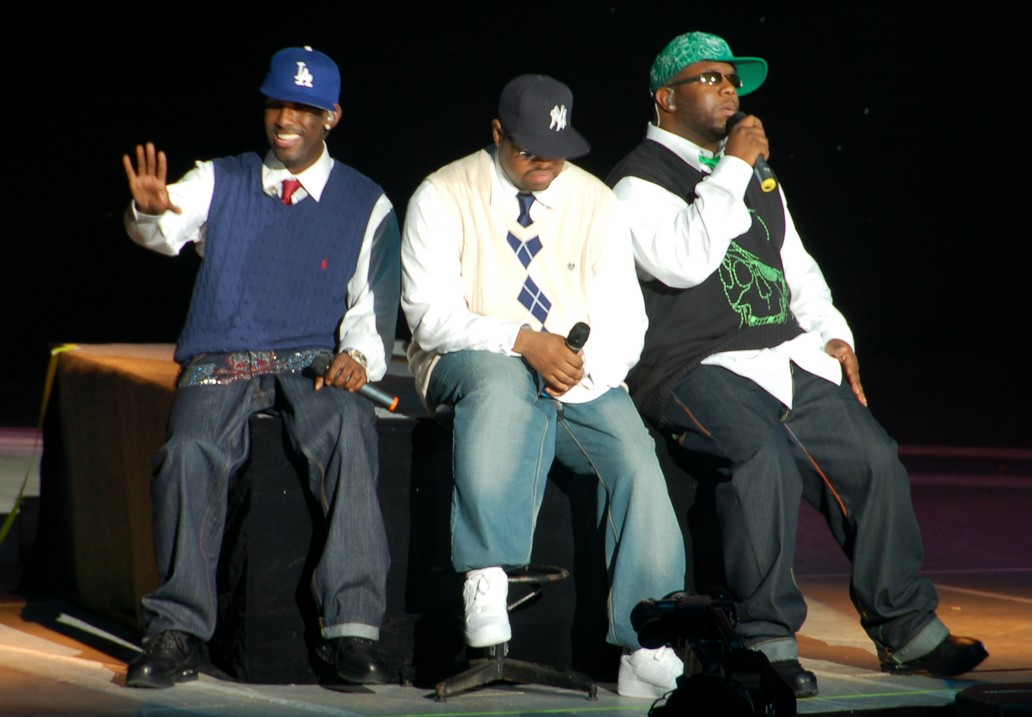
Boyz II Men at the Genting Highlands, Malaysia in 2007

After a year out of the spotlight, Boyz II Men created the independent label MSM Music Group (distributed through Koch Records), and released the Throwback, Vol. 1 LP in 2004. The album is a collection of covers of classic R&B and soul songs such as The Dazz Band's "Let It Whip", Michael Jackson's "Human Nature", and, as the single, Bobby Caldwell's "What You Won't Do for Love". For this record, Nathan took on the bass lines as well as the baritone vocals that he sang when Boyz II Men was a quartet. Throwback, Vol. 1 reached number 59 on the Billboard 200. The group launched an independent tour of North America and Asia in support of the Throwback series. The album sold over 200,000 copies with little to no promotion aside from the group's independent tour.

In 2005 Boyz II Men recorded a CD with Anderson Cameau called "Apocalypse", a project meant to benefit Haiti.

In 2006, Boyz II Men's seventh studio album, The Remedy, was released exclusively in Japan, where they found a thriving fan base. In other regions, The Remedy was made available online through the group's website on February 14, 2007.

=== 2007–2009: Hitsville USA & Love ===
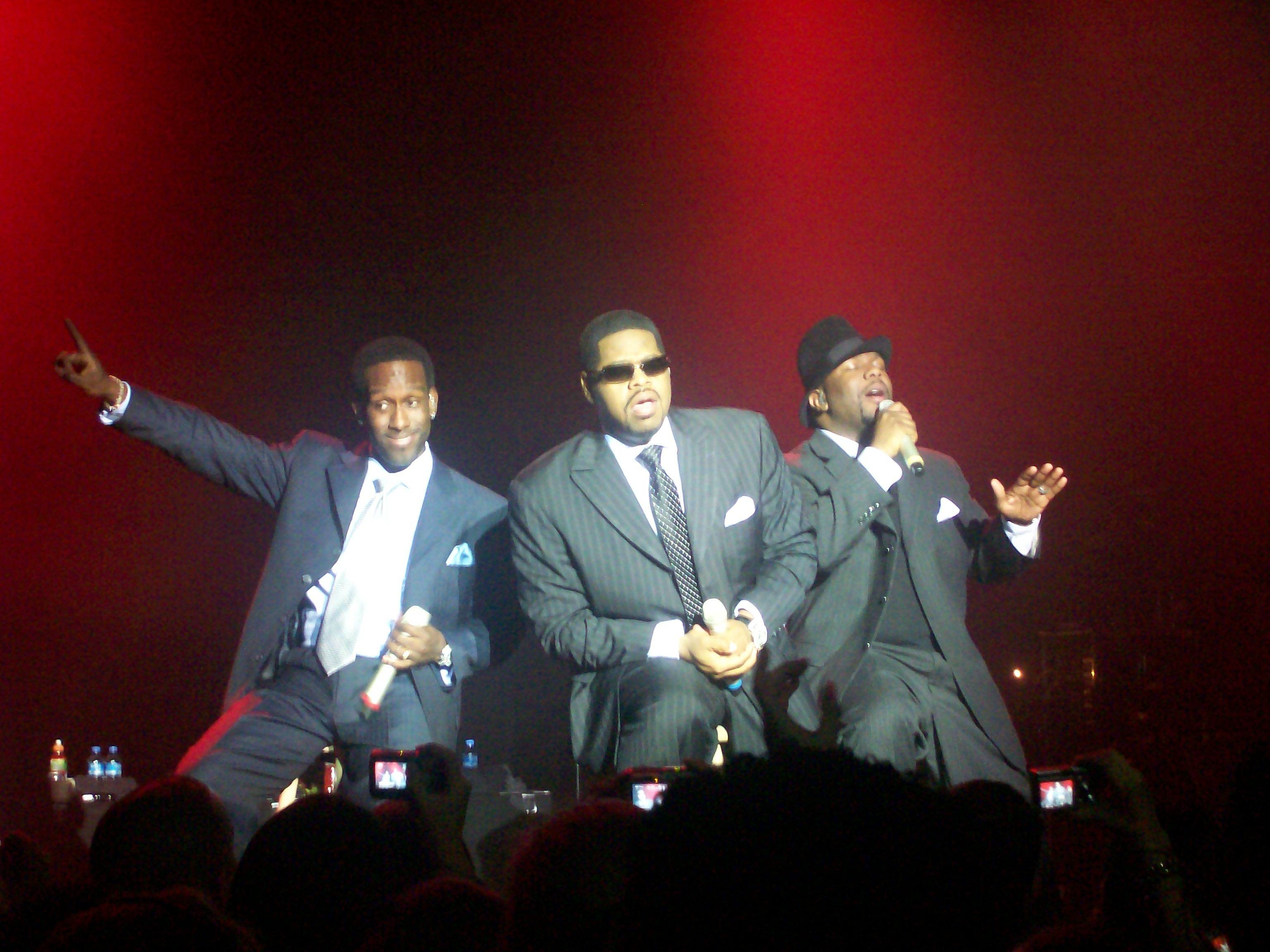
Boyz II Men Live at Vegas in 2008

In mid-2007, the group re-signed with Universal Records and released the LP Motown: A Journey Through Hitsville USA through the Decca Records label. The LP is a cover album featuring songs from the Motown Records catalog, co-produced by Randy Jackson of American Idol fame. The Motown album includes covers of songs by The Temptations ("Just My Imagination (Running Away with Me)"), Marvin Gaye ("Ain't Nothing Like the Real Thing", "Mercy Mercy Me"), Smokey Robinson & the Miracles ("The Tracks of My Tears"), and even Boyz II Men themselves (an a cappella version of "End of the Road").

Commercially, Motown found some success. It peaked at number 6 on the US R&B chart and was certified Gold in the UK. The album was also a critical success. For the 51st Annual Grammy Awards in 2009, Boyz II Men received two nominations for the album Motown: A Journey Through Hitsville USA (Best R&B Album and Best R&B Performance by a Duo or Group with Vocals for "Ribbon in the Sky").

In 2008, Boyz II Men's three members appeared on Celebrity Don't Forget the Lyrics and created a sensation with their performance. They earned $500,000 for their two nominated charities; the appearance also generated interest in their next release.

In 2009, Boyz II Men announced plans for a new cover album that covers "artists I don't think people would expect us to cover!" according to Shawn Stockman. Entitled Love, the album was released on November 23, 2009. The album contains remakes of love songs from outside the R&B genre.

=== 2010–2012: Love Cruise and Twenty ===
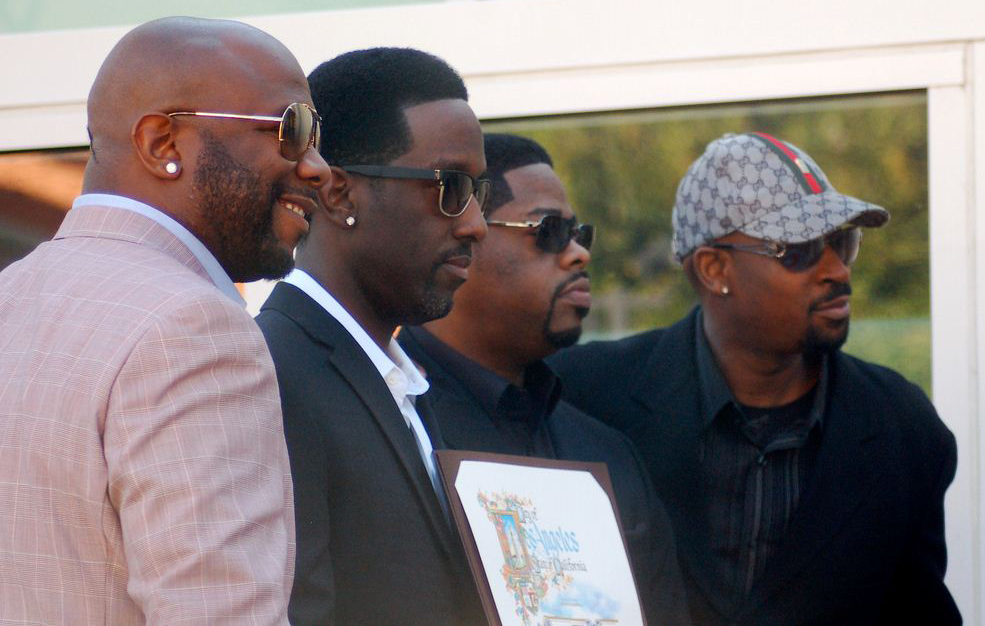
Boyz II Men receiving a star on the Hollywood Walk of Fame in January 2012

Boyz II Men headlined a "Love Cruise" in honor of their 20th anniversary and in observance of Valentine's Day. The cruise took place February 11–14, 2011, and traveled from Miami, Florida, to Nassau, Bahamas. Cruise passengers received a Boyz II Men welcome cocktail party, a concert performance by Boyz II Men, an additional fan appreciation concert by Boyz II Men, a photo session with Boyz II Men (in small groups), a formal prom night, a poker tournament, a deck party with Boyz II Men and a guest DJ, a singles mixer, a gift bag, and onboard drawings for other Boyz II Men events. Couples were able to renew their wedding vows in a special ceremony with Boyz II Men.

Twenty, named in recognition of Boyz II Men's twenty years in the music business, is a double CD album with thirteen original songs and eight rerecorded Boyz II Men classics. It was released on October 25, 2011. Twenty is the group's fourth release through MSM Music Group. It was released in Japan 13 days before its official US release date with the help of Avex Group, the biggest Japanese independent record label.

Originally, Boyz II Men announced a reunion with original member Michael McCary for the Twenty album. On September 6, 2009, at a concert in Virginia Beach, Virginia, Stockman announced that their upcoming 20th anniversary album would "include all 4 members", sparking a tremendous applause. But soon after that announcement, McCary reportedly declined, and in the end, he did not join the project. The album was released on October 25, 2011.

Later in 2011, Boyz II Men performed as special guests on VH1's highly rated VH1 Divas Celebrate Soul concert.

In 2012, Boyz II Men contributed a cover of Japanese rock band L'Arc-en-Ciel's song "Snow Drop" on their tribute album.

=== 2013–2019: Las Vegas residency, Collide and Under the Streelight ===
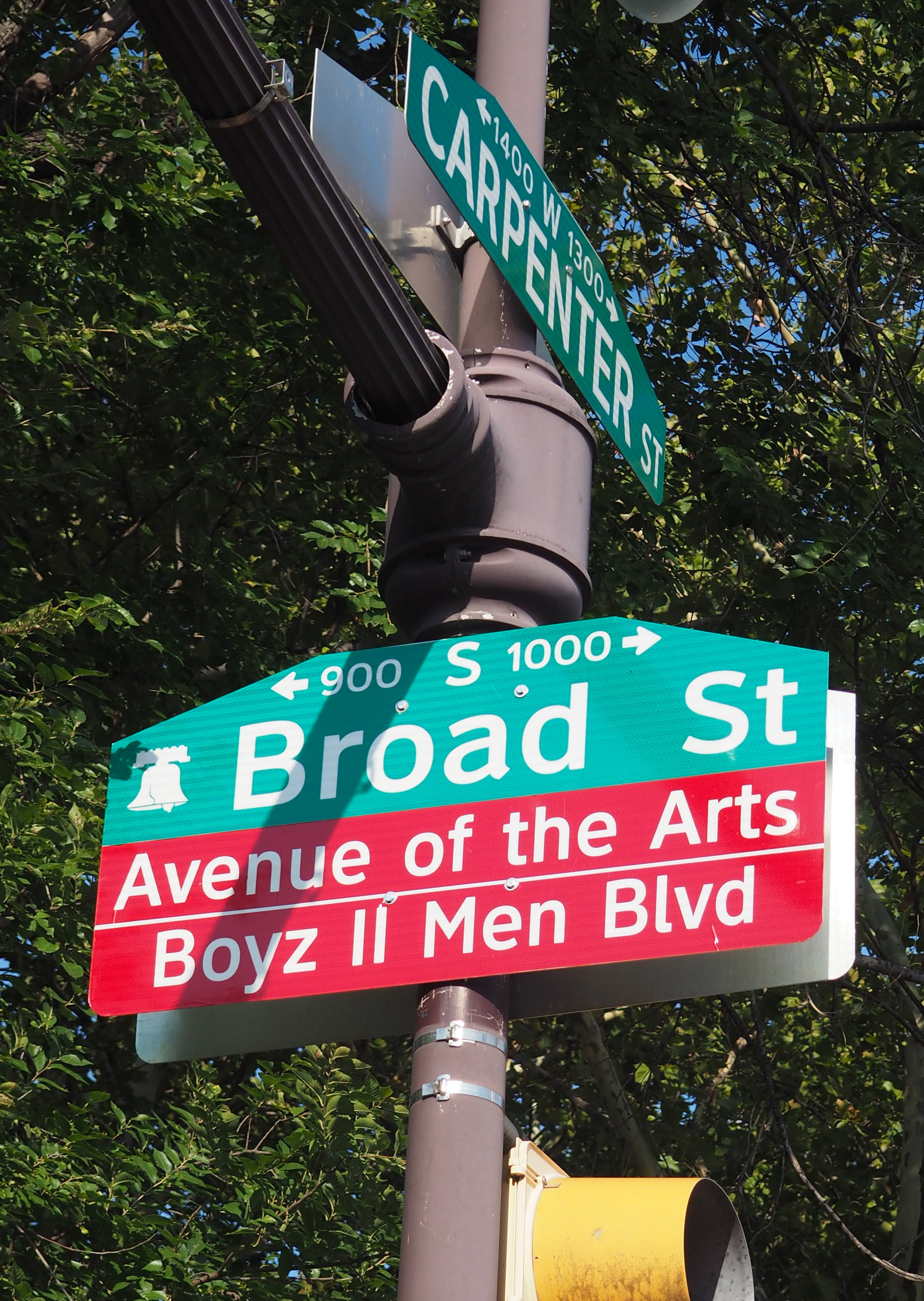
Broad Street in Philadelphia, from Christian to Carpenter Streets, was renamed Boyz II Men Boulevard

On January 22, 2013, the group appeared on The View along with New Kids on the Block and 98 Degrees to announce a joint tour that took place in summer 2013.

Shortly thereafter, Boyz II Men announced that beginning later in 2013, they would stop touring and begin a multi-year residency in Las Vegas, Nevada, at the Mirage Hotel and Casino. That residency, which included multiple performances each week, ran until 2018.

On January 13, 2014, the trio appeared at the end of an episode of How I Met Your Mother titled "Slapsgiving 3: Slappointment in Slapmarra", performing an a cappella version of the show's song "You Just Got Slapped". Their eleventh album, titled Collide, was released on October 21, 2014.

In 2016, the trio appeared in Grease: Live as the Teen Angels and sang Beauty School Dropout. Wanyá placed 4th for the 22nd season of the ABC reality competition series Dancing With The Stars. They also did music for an animated adaptation of The Snowy Day.

In 2017, the group began starring in television commercials for GEICO Auto Insurance.

On June 24, 2017, a section of Broad Street in Philadelphia, from Christian to Carpenter Streets, was renamed “Boyz II Men Boulevard” by the city council. Philadelphia High School for the Creative and Performing Arts, where the members of Boyz II Men were once students, is on this section of Broad Street.

In August 2017, it was announced that Boyz II Men would release a new album titled Under the Streetlight in the fall. The album, a collection of covers from the 1950s, along with one original track, "Ladies Man," was released on October 20, 2017, debuting and peaking at number 58 on the US Current Album Sales chart.

On January 4, 2018, the group was featured in a new track released by Charlie Puth, titled "If You Leave Me Now", created for Charlie Puth's album Voicenotes.

On September 6, 2018, the group performed at the NFL 2018–2019 season kickoff at Lincoln Financial Field in Philadelphia, PA.

On October 2, 2018, the group performed "Ladies Man" on ABC's Dancing with the Stars. DeMarcus Ware and Lindsay Arnold danced a quickstep to the song.

The group is featured on a re-imagined version of Take That's song Love Ain't Here Anymore from their number one selling album Odyssey. Howard Donald revealed during an interview with Magic Radio that "he fulfilled a dream when they recorded this song".

On December 15, 2018, the group staged a concert at the Smart Araneta Coliseum with Filipina singers Kyla, Yeng Constantino, KZ Tandingan and Angeline Quinto titled Boyz II Men with DIVAS.

On September 18, 2019, it was reported that the group would play themselves on the ABC comedy series Schooled.

On September 30, 2019, Boyz II Men announced their Asia Tour, which took place after returning from their US tour and the end of their long-term residency at The Mirage in Las Vegas. They visited cities such as Kuala Lumpur (December 1), Bangkok (December 7), Singapore (December 9), and Manila (December 12).

=== 2020–present: Reported biographical film and occasional reunions with McCary ===
In 2021, Boyz II Men's career became the focus of the first episode of the Netflix music documentary mini-series This Is Pop. The name of the episode is, "The Boyz II Men Effect." In the episode, music critics and historians evaluate the reasons why Boyz II Men's influence on American popular music have been often overlooked. The episode contains extended interviews with all three members of Boyz II Men, and shows several highlights of recent performances.

On December 31, 2022, Boyz II Men performed the national anthem at the Fiesta Bowl before the Michigan Wolverines and the TCU Horned Frogs faced off in the College Football Playoff semifinals. They later performed an a cappella version of the anthem at the 2024 Las Vegas Grand Prix, which was widely panned by fans.

In 2024, Boyz II Men competed in season twelve of The Masked Singer as "Buffalos" where Nick Lachey (who competed as "Piglet" in season five) served as their Mask Ambassador. Shawn played the Buffalo named Maroon, Nathan played the Buffalo named Olive and Wanya played the Buffalo named Goldie. Originally, there was one "Buffalo" in the first appearance before the other two came out during their performance of Cutting Crew's "(I Just) Died In Your Arms". They became the first group to win a season of the show while member Nathan Morris became the oldest winner in the show's history at the age of 53, beating out the record held by Wayne Brady in season two. Robin Thicke, Jenny McCarthy Wahlberg, Ken Jeong, Rita Ora, Nick Cannon, the entire audience, and Mario as "Wasp" (who finished in second place) figured out that Boyz II Men was "Buffalos". Boyz II Men did an encore performance of "Motownphilly".

In 2024, Boyz II Men returned to Las Vegas for a brief residency at The Chelsea. They returned for week-long residencies at the same venue in 2025 and 2026, becoming what one local publication called an "annual tradition."

On August 30, 2024, at The Chelsea, Michael McCary made a surprise appearance on stage with Boyz II Men, when he was called up to the stage and embraced by all three current members. McCary did not sing, but this moment marked the first time McCary had been seen publicly with Boyz II Men since 2012 (when they received a star on the Hollywood Walk of Fame).

On November 14, 2024, Variety reported that work on a Boyz II Men biopic had begun, with development led by Compelling Pictures (which produced the 2018 Academy Award-winning biopic Bohemian Rhapsody among other films).

On November 22, 2024, the charity Christmas album A Philly Special Christmas Party by The Philly Specials was released, featuring Boyz II Men on the song "It's Christmas Time (In Cleveland Heights)".

In 2025, Boyz II Men was part of the show KPopped, performing with k-pop group Blackswan. They performed "Roll Up", "Motownphilly" and "End of the Road".

On August 9, 2025, again at The Chelsea, McCary again appeared on stage with Boyz II Men, and this time he joined them in performing part of "In The Still of the Nite" and "I'll Make Love to You", marking the first time McCary had sung publicly with Boyz II Men since 2002, more than twenty years earlier.

On January 30, 2026, McCary surprised the audience and performed "End of the Road" with Boyz II Men on stage at the T-Mobile Arena in Las Vegas, during their North American tour with New Edition. These repeated appearances of McCary with his former bandmates, starting in 2024, led to speculation that a full reunion might be possible in the near future.

== Legacy ==
Boyz II Men is among the biggest names in a cappella and R&B. With what was called "crossover appeal", Boyz II Men found themselves at the vanguard of the 1990s movement to take R&B back into the mainstream, where it had been back in the 1970s. Their use of hip-hop beats in combination with R&B was not unique, but it was Boyz II Men's enormous success with mainstream audiences in "putting harmony over the hip-hop tracks" that helped usher in the near-total dominance of the R&B genre on the pop charts in the 2000s and 2010s. On January 5, 2012, Boyz II Men were awarded a star on the Hollywood Walk of Fame. They were featured on the first episode of the 2021 Netflix series This Is Pop, called "The Boyz II Men Effect", about their impact on the boy band scene in the 1990s.

== Band members ==
Current members

- Nathan Morris (1985–present)
- Wanyá Morris (1987–present)
- Shawn Stockman (1988–present)

Former members

- Michael McCary (1988–2003)
- Marc Nelson (1985–90)
- George Baldi (1985–88)
- Jon Shoats (1985–88)
- Marguerite Walker (1985–88)

== Discography ==
Studio albums

- Cooleyhighharmony (1991)
- Christmas Interpretations (1993)
- II (1994)
- Evolution (1997)
- Nathan Michael Shawn Wanya (2000)
- Full Circle (2002)
- Throwback, Vol. 1 (2004)
- The Remedy (2006)
- Motown: A Journey Through Hitsville USA (2007)
- Love (2009)
- Covered: Winter (2010)
- Twenty (2011)
- Collide (2014)
- Under the Streetlight (2017)

== Filmography ==
- The Jacksons: An American Dream (1992): The group made a cameo appearance, performing "In the Still of the Nite (I'll Remember)" before confronting Jackie Jackson (Terence Howard).
- "Going Home" (1995): A Disney Channel concert special filmed during Boyz II Men's "All Around the World Tour" live from the Alamodome in San Antonio, Texas.
- The group made a guest appearance in the fourth season episode "Twas the Night Before Christening" of The Fresh Prince of Bel-Air in which they sing at Nicky's christening (1993).
- "Living In Paradise?" (2000): They appeared as themselves on the hit show Moesha.
- How I Met Your Mother (2014): They appeared as themselves in an episode to perform "You Just Got Slapped".
- Long Shot: They appear as themselves performing at a charity event.
- This Is Pop (2021): They are featured on the episode "The Boyz II Men Effect".
- Celebrity Wheel of Fortune (2021): Wanyá and Shawn play to win money for charities of their choice.
- A Very Boyband Christmas (2021): Wanyá and Shawn join members of 'Nsync, 98 Degrees and other boy bands to celebrate the holidays.
- Live in Front of a Studio Audience (2021): The group performs the theme song of Diff'rent Strokes as the intro to the special's reenactment of "Willis’s Privacy".
- Barmageddon (2023): They appear as themselves as contestants, taking parts in various games & challenges during the show.
- New York Undercover (Season 1 Episode 9 "The Friendly Neighbourhood Dealer") (1994): Boyz II Men appear as the musical act for this episode.

== Awards & nominations ==
American Music Awards

Year	Nominee / work	Award	Result
1992	Boyz II Men	Favorite Soul/R&B New Artist	Won
1992	Boyz II Men	Favorite Pop/Rock New Artist	Nominated
1992	Boyz II Men	Favorite Soul/R&B Band/Duo/Group	Nominated
1992	"Motownphilly"	Favorite Soul/R&B Single	Nominated
1992	Cooleyhighharmony	Favorite Soul/R&B Album	Nominated
1993	"End of the Road"	Favorite Pop/Rock Song	Won
1993	Boyz II Men	Favorite Soul/R&B Band/Duo/Group	Won
1995	Boyz II Men	Favorite Soul/R&B Band/Duo/Group	Won
1995	Boyz II Men	Favorite Adult Contemporary Artist	Nominated
1995	"I'll Make Love to You"	Favorite Soul/R&B Single	Won
1995	"I'll Make Love to You"	Favorite Pop/Rock Song	Won
1996	II	Favorite Soul/R&B Album	Won
1996	II	Favorite Pop/Rock Album	Nominated
1996	Boyz II Men	Artist of the Year	Nominated
1996	Boyz II Men	Favorite Pop/Rock Band/Duo/Group	Nominated
1996	Boyz II Men	Favorite Soul/R&B Band/Duo/Group	Won
1998	Boyz II Men	Favorite Soul/R&B Band/Duo/Group	Won

Billboard Music Awards

Year	Nominee / work	Award	Result
1992	Boyz II Men	Top Hot 100 Artist	Won
1992	"End of the Road"	Top Hot 100 Song	Won
1994	"I'll Make Love to You"	Top Hot 100 Song	Nominated
1995	II	Top Billboard 200 Album	Nominated
1995	Boyz II Men	Top Artist	Nominated
1995	Boyz II Men	Top R&B Artist	Nominated
1996	"One Sweet Day" (with Mariah Carey)	Top Hot 100 Song	Nominated
1996	"One Sweet Day" (with Mariah Carey)	Billboard Music Special Hot 100	Won

Children's & Family Emmy Awards

Year	Nominee / work	Award	Result
2023	"The City of Brothery Love" from Jam Van	Outstanding Original Song for a Preschool Program	Nominated

Grammy Awards

Year	Nominee / work	Award	Result
1992	Boyz II Men	Best New Artist	Nominated
1992	Cooleyhighharmony	Best R&B Performance by a Duo or Group with Vocal	Won
1993	"End of the Road"	Best R&B Performance by a Duo or Group with Vocal	Won
1994	"Let It Snow"	Best R&B Performance by a Duo or Group with Vocal	Nominated
1995	"I'll Make Love To You"	Best R&B Performance by a Duo or Group with Vocal	Won
1995	"I'll Make Love To You"	Record of the Year	Nominated
1995	II	Best R&B Album	Won
1996	"One Sweet Day" (with Mariah Carey)	Record of the Year	Nominated
1996	"One Sweet Day" (with Mariah Carey)	Best Pop Collaboration with Vocals	Nominated
1998	"A Song For Mama"	Best R&B Performance by a Duo or Group with Vocal	Nominated
1998	Evolution	Best R&B Album	Nominated
2001	Nathan Michael Shawn Wanya	Best R&B Album	Nominated
2001	"Pass You By"	Best R&B Performance By a Duo or Group with Vocal	Nominated
2009	"Ribbon In The Sky"	Best R&B Performance By a Duo or Group with Vocal	Nominated
2009	Motown: A Journey Through Hitsville USA	Best R&B Album	Nominated

MTV Video Music Awards

Year	Nominee / work	Award	Result	Ref.
1993	"End of the Road"	Best R&B Video	Nominated	
1995	"Water Runs Dry"	Best R&B Video	Nominated	
1995	"Water Runs Dry"	Best Cinematography	Nominated	
1996	"One Sweet Day" (with Mariah Carey)	Best R&B Video	Nominated	

Soul Train Music Awards

Year	Nominee / work	Award	Result
1992	Boyz II Men	Best New R&B/Soul Artist	Won
1993	"End of the Road"	Song of the Year	Won
1993	"End of the Road"	Best R&B Music Video	Won
1993	"Please Don't Go"	Best R&B Single – Group, Band or Duo	Won
1995	II	R&B/Soul Album Group, Band or Duo	Won
1995	"I'll Make Love to You"	R&B/Soul Single Group, Band or Duo	Won
1996	Boyz II Men	Entertainer of the Year	Won
1998	Evolution	Best R&B/Soul Album – Group, Band or Duo	Nominated
2003	Full Circle	Best R&B/Soul Album – Group, Band or Duo	Nominated

== See also ==
- List of best-selling music artists
- List of artists who reached number one in the United States
