= Motownphilly =

1991 single by Boyz II Men

- US 12-inch vinyl single

Single by Boyz II Men

from the album Cooleyhighharmony
- Released: April 1991
- Genre: Soul; new jack swing; doo-wop
- Length: 3:56
- Label: Motown
- Songwriters: Dallas Austin; Michael Bivins; Nathan Morris; Shawn Stockman
- Producer: Dallas Austin

Boyz II Men singles chronology
| "Motownphilly" (1991) | "It's So Hard to Say Goodbye to Yesterday" (1991) |

Music video
- "Motownphilly" on YouTube

"Motownphilly" is the debut single by American vocal harmony group Boyz II Men, released in April 1991 by Motown as the first single from their debut album, Cooleyhighharmony (1991). Co-written and produced by Dallas Austin, the song was a success, peaking at number three on the US Billboard Hot 100. Michael Bivins, who co-wrote the song, provides a guest rap during the bridge. The song's title is a portmanteau of two of the group's main musical influences: 1960s Motown and 1970s Philly soul.

The accompanying music video for the song was filmed in various locations in the group's hometown of Philadelphia. Two new jack swing groups, Another Bad Creation and Bell Biv DeVoe, are mentioned in the lyrics. They appear briefly in the video, as does Sudden Impact, a short-lived R&B group organized by Bivins. Additionally, Questlove appears briefly as a drummer, due to his previous relationship with the group from high school.

== Critical reception ==
Dele Fadele from NME wrote, "Floating on a cloud through the chequered history of soul, yet inherently modern, Boyz II Men are plotting the new musical map. From Detroit to Philadelphia, this is East Coast style and sass in abundance, mixing and matching MFSB strings, House synth-bass, raps and the ghost of several songs rolled into one. Somewhere in the ever-shifting mix you learn their tale and, if I were Bell Biv DeVoe, I'd prepare to be usurped."

== Track listings ==
- US vinyl, 12-inch

A1: "Motownphilly" (12-inch version) – 4:47
A2: "Motownphilly" (LP version) – 3:52
B: "Motownphilly" (instrumental) – 5:50

- US CD maxi
1. "Motownphilly" (12-inch version Edit) – 4:47
2. "Motownphilly" (LP version) – 3:52
3. "Motownphilly" (quiet storm) – 4:06
4. "Motownphilly" (12-inch A) – 5:50
5. "Motownphilly" (12-inch dub) – 4:08
- UK vinyl, 7-inch

A: "Motownphilly" (7-inch radio version) – 3:50
B: "Motownphilly" (Philly instrumental) – 3:50

- UK vinyl, 12-inch

A: "Motownphilly" (12-inch extended club mix) – 5:35
B1: "Motownphilly" (7-inch radio version) – 3:50
B2: "Motownphilly" (Philly instrumental) – 3:50
B3: "Motownphilly" (dub mix) – 4:08

- Germany CD maxi
1. "Motownphilly" (12-inch version) – 5:50
2. "Motownphilly" (7-inch main) – 3:20
3. "Motownphilly" (12-inch dub) – 4:09
4. "Motownphilly" (quiet storm) – 4:06

== Charts ==
=== Weekly charts ===
Weekly chart performance for "Motownphilly"
| Chart (1991–1993) | Peak position |
|---|---|
| Australia (ARIA) | 32 |
| Canada Retail Singles (The Record) | 38 |
| Canada Contemporary Hit Radio (The Record) | 34 |
| Europe (Eurochart Hot 100) | 48 |
| France Airplay (SNEP) | 98 |
| Ireland (IRMA) | 16 |
| Israel (Israeli Singles Chart) | 19 |
| Netherlands (Single Top 100) | 29 |
| New Zealand (Recorded Music NZ) | 38 |
| UK Singles (Official Charts) | 23 |
| UK Airplay (Music Week) | 7 |
| UK Dance (Music Week) | 28 |
| UK Club Chart (Music Week) | 81 |
| US Billboard Hot 100 | 3 |
| US Hot R&B/Hip-Hop Songs (Billboard) | 4 |
| US Cash Box Top 100 | 3 |
| Zimbabwe (ZIMA) | 1 |

=== Year-end charts ===
Year-end chart performance for "Motownphilly"
| Chart (1991) | Position |
|---|---|
| US Billboard Hot 100 | 11 |
| US Hot R&B Singles (Billboard) | 23 |

== Certifications ==
Certifications for "Motownphilly"
| Region | Certification | Certified units/sales |
|---|---|---|
| United States (RIAA) | Platinum | 1,000,000^{^} |
^{^} Shipments figures based on certification alone.

== Release history ==
Release history for "Motownphilly"
| Region | Date | Format(s) | Label(s) | Ref. |
|---|---|---|---|---|
| United States | April 1991 | 7-inch vinyl; 12-inch vinyl; CD; cassette | Motown | |
| Australia | July 29, 1991 | 12-inch vinyl; cassette | Motown | |
| Japan | August 21, 1991 | Mini-CD | Motown | |
| United Kingdom | December 7, 1992 | 7-inch vinyl; 12-inch vinyl; CD; cassette | Motown | |
