= Please Don't Go (Boyz II Men song) =

1992 single by Boyz II Men

Single by Boyz II Men

from the album Cooleyhighharmony
- Released: March 17, 1992
- Genre: R&B
- Length: 4:26
- Label: Motown
- Songwriter: Nathan Morris
- Producer: Dallas Austin

Boyz II Men singles chronology
"Uhh Ahh" (1991)	"Please Don't Go" (1992)	"End of the Road" (1992)

"Please Don't Go" is a song by American group Boyz II Men, from their debut album, Cooleyhighharmony (1991). It reached number 49 on the US Billboard Hot 100 in 1992 and number three on the New Zealand Singles Chart in 1993.

== Charts ==
=== Weekly charts ===
Chart (1992–1993)	Peak position
Australia (ARIA)	191
Canada Retail Singles (The Record)	31
New Zealand (Recorded Music NZ)	3
US Billboard Hot 100	49
US Hot R&B/Hip-Hop Songs (Billboard)	8
US Cash Box Top 100	38

=== Year-end charts ===
Chart (1992)	Position
US Hot R&B Singles (Billboard)	78

Chart (1993)	Position
New Zealand (RIANZ)	50

== Release history ==
Region	Date	Format(s)	Label(s)	Ref.
United States	March 17, 1992	—N/a	Motown	
Australia	June 22, 1992	CD; cassette	Motown	
Japan	July 1, 1992	Mini-CD	Motown	
