= 4 Seasons of Loneliness =

1997 single by Boyz II Men

Single by Boyz II Men

from the album Evolution
- Released: September 8, 1997
- Length: 4:52 (album version); 4:27 (radio edit)
- Label: Motown
- Songwriters: James Harris III; Terry Lewis
- Producer: Jimmy Jam and Terry Lewis

Boyz II Men singles chronology
"I Remember" (1995)	"4 Seasons of Loneliness" (1997)	"A Song for Mama" (1997)

"4 Seasons of Loneliness" is a song by Philadelphia-based vocal quartet Boyz II Men. Written and produced by Jimmy Jam and Terry Lewis, the song was issued as the first single from their fourth studio album, Evolution (1997), on September 8, 1997.

Already a success on US radio, the release of the single prompted a Billboard Hot 100 debut at number two. The following week, the song moved up to number one, becoming Boyz II Men's fifth chart-topper and, as of 2026, the last Hot 100 number-one hit under the Motown banner. "4 Seasons of Loneliness" was also the group's last top-10 hit in both New Zealand and the United Kingdom, debuting at number two on the New Zealand Singles Chart and number 10 on the UK Singles Chart.

== Critical reception ==
Larry Flick from Billboard magazine stated, "The long-anticipated "Evolution" is previewed with a heart-rending ballad that underlines the act's signature harmonies with a quietly rumbling R&B groove. Producers Jimmy Jam and Terry Lewis wisely do not fuss too much with the act's hit-making formula, which still sounds fresh after all these years - thanks mostly to the friendly and often romantic personalities the lads bring to the material. Others may be able to duplicate Boyz II Men's technical sound, but you can't manufacture vibe and personality, both of which are in ample supply here. The countdown to No. 1 starts now."

== Track listings ==
- US CD, 7-inch, and cassette single
1. "4 Seasons of Loneliness" (LP version) — 4:51
2. "4 Seasons of Loneliness" (B II M version) — 5:30
- Canadian, UK, Australian, and Japanese CD single
1. "4 Seasons of Loneliness" (radio edit) — 4:27
2. "4 Seasons of Loneliness" (B II M version) — 5:30
3. "4 Seasons of Loneliness" (instrumental) — 4:51
4. "4 Seasons of Loneliness" (a cappella) — 4:41
- UK cassette single
1. "4 Seasons of Loneliness" (radio edit) — 4:27
2. "4 Seasons of Loneliness" (extended Wannya mix) — 5:30

== Charts ==
=== Weekly charts ===
Weekly chart performance for "4 Seasons of Loneliness"
Chart (1997–1998)	Peak position
Australia (ARIA)	13
Belgium (Ultratip Bubbling Under Flanders)	13
Belgium (Ultratop 50 Wallonia)	38
Canada (Nielsen SoundScan)	5
Canada Contemporary Hit Radio (BDS)	10
Canada Top Singles (RPM)	8
Canada Adult Contemporary (RPM)	42
Estonia (Eesti Top 20)	13
Europe (Eurochart Hot 100)	34
Europe (European Hit Radio)	22
France Airplay (SNEP)	25
Germany (GfK)	59
Ireland (IRMA)	26
Netherlands (Dutch Top 40)	9
Netherlands (Single Top 100)	11
New Zealand (Recorded Music NZ)	2
Scottish Singles Sales (Official Charts)	39
Spain Airplay (Top 40 Radio)	24
Sweden (Sverigetopplistan)	45
Switzerland (Schweizer Hitparade)	32
UK Singles (Official Charts)	10
UK Airplay (Music Week)	30
UK Hip Hop/R&B (Official Charts)	2
US Billboard Hot 100	1
US Adult Contemporary (Billboard)	30
US Hot Latin Songs (Billboard) Spanish version: "4 Estaciones de Soledad"	27
US Hot R&B/Hip-Hop Songs (Billboard)	2
US Pop Airplay (Billboard)	9
US Rhythmic Airplay (Billboard)	3

=== Year-end charts ===
1997 year-end chart performance for "4 Seasons of Loneliness"
Chart (1997)	Position
Australia (ARIA)	91
Canada Top Singles (RPM)	66
Netherlands (Dutch Top 40)	87
Netherlands (Single Top 100)	68
New Zealand (RIANZ)	31
US Billboard Hot 100	30
US Hot R&B Singles (Billboard)	25
US Rhythmic Top 40 (Billboard)	39
US Top 40/Mainstream (Billboard)	57

1998 year-end chart performance for "4 Seasons of Loneliness"
Chart (1998)	Position
US Billboard Hot 100	96
US R&B Singles (Billboard)	95
US Rhythmic Top 40 (Billboard)	75

== Certifications ==
Certifications and sales for "4 Seasons of Loneliness"
Region	Certification	Certified units/sales
Australia (ARIA)	Gold	35,000^{^}
United States (RIAA)	Platinum	1,300,000
^{^} Shipments figures based on certification alone.

== Release history ==
Release dates and formats for "4 Seasons of Loneliness"
Region	Date	Format(s)	Label(s)	Ref.
United States	August 1997	Top 40; R&B; rhythmic; jazz-AC radio	Motown	
United Kingdom	September 8, 1997	CD	Motown	
United States	September 9, 1997	7-inch vinyl; CD; cassette	Motown	
Japan	September 20, 1997	CD	Motown	
