= A Song for Mama =

1997 single by Boyz II Men

Single by Boyz II Men

from the album Evolution and Soul Food (soundtrack)
- Released: November 3, 1997
- Genre: R&B; soul
- Length: 5:02 (album version); 4:30 (radio version)
- Label: Motown
- Songwriter: Babyface
- Producer: Babyface

Boyz II Men singles chronology
"4 Seasons of Loneliness" (1997)	"A Song for Mama" (1997)	"Can't Let Her Go" (1998)

"A Song for Mama" is a song by the American R&B group Boyz II Men. Written and produced by Babyface, it served as the theme song to the 1997 motion picture Soul Food and also appears on the group's fourth album, Evolution (1997), from which it served as the second single. The song peaked at number seven on the US Billboard Hot 100 and spent two weeks at number one on the US Billboard Hot R&B Singles chart.

== Critical reception ==
Larry Flick from Billboard magazine wrote, "It's a tear-tugging ode to mothers, delivered with the kind of seamless harmonies that one has come to expect from these Boyz. Producer/writer Babyface's fingerprints are all over the track, from its delicate piano lines to its soft but insinuating percussion. There's no denying that this act is at its best when the members are wrapping their voices around a Babyface composition. If you still need proof, let quietly emotional lines like "loving you is like food for my soul" wash over your senses. As the world inches closer to the holiday season, look for this single to become a sentimental favorite at every possible radio format."

== Track listings ==
- US single
1. A Song for Mama (Radio Edit) 4:30
2. A Song for Mama (LP Version) 5:02
3. A Song for Mama (Instrumental) 5:05
- US live version single
1. A Song for Mama – Live Version (Radio Edit) 4:11
2. A Song for Mama – Live Version (Main Version) 5:10
- Europe single
1. A Song for Mama (Radio Edit)
2. A Song for Mama (LP Version)
- Europe maxi-CD
1. A Song for Mama (Radio Edit) 4:30
2. I'll Make Love To You (LP Version) 3:57
3. Motownphilly (LP Version) 3:56
4. Sympin' (Remix Radio Edit) 3:58
- Europe maxi-CD 2
1. A Song for Mama (Radio Edit) 4:30
2. A Song for Mama (LP Version) 5:02
3. Baby C'Mon (LP Version) 4:36
4. A Song for Mama (Instrumental) 5:05

== Personnel ==
Personnel are adapted from the liner notes of Evolution.

- Boyz II Men: all vocals
- Babyface: writing, composing, production, keyboards and drum programming
- Greg Phillinganes: piano
- Nathan East: bass
- Michael Thompson: guitar
- Brad Gilderman, Manny Marroquin, Paul Boutin: recording engineers
- Jon Gass: mix engineering
- Paul Boutin: assistant mix engineering
- Randy Walker: midi programming
- Ivy Skoff: production coordination

== Charts ==
=== Weekly charts ===
Chart (1997–1998)	Peak position
Australia (ARIA)	61
Canada (Nielsen SoundScan)	25
France Airplay (SNEP)	62
Netherlands (Dutch Top 40)	31
Netherlands (Single Top 100)	33
New Zealand (Recorded Music NZ)	15
Scottish Singles Sales (Official Charts)	68
Spain Airplay (Top 40 Radio)	25
UK Singles (Official Charts)	34
UK Hip Hop/R&B (Official Charts)	4
US Billboard Hot 100	7
US Hot R&B/Hip-Hop Songs (Billboard)	1
US Pop Airplay (Billboard)	32
US Rhythmic Airplay (Billboard)	7

=== Year-end charts ===
Chart (1998)	Position
US Billboard Hot 100	30
US Hot R&B Singles (Billboard)	12
US Rhythmic Top 40 (Billboard)	32

== Certifications ==
Region	Certification	Certified units/sales
United States (RIAA)	2× Platinum	2,000,000^{‡}
^{‡} Sales+streaming figures based on certification alone.

== Release history ==
Region	Date	Format(s)	Label(s)	Ref.
United States	November 3, 1997	Urban radio	Motown	
Japan	November 24, 1997	CD	Motown	
United Kingdom	November 24, 1997	CD; cassette	Motown	

== See also ==
- List of number-one R&B singles of 1997 (U.S.)
- List of number-one R&B singles of 1998 (U.S.)
