= Covered: Winter =

Studio album by Boyz II Men
- Released: December 22, 2010
- Genres: Pop; R&B
- Length: 44:50
- Labels: MSM; Rhythm Zone

Boyz II Men chronology
Love (2009)	Covered: Winter (2010)	Twenty (2011)

Covered: Winter is the twelfth studio album by the American R&B group Boyz II Men. It was released through the band's own label MSM Music Group and Rhythm Zone on December 22, 2010 in Japan only. The album compromises nine English language cover versions of Japanese songs by Hikaru Utada, Toshinobu Kubota, Mika Nakashima, and others. Covered: Winter peaked at number 88 on the Japanese Albums Chart.

== Track listing ==
No.	Title	Original Artist	Length
1.	"Intro"	–	0:27
2.	"Missing"	Toshinobu Kubota	5:07
3.	"First Love"	Hikaru Utada	4:16
4.	"Snowflowers"	Mika Nakashima	5:30
5.	"Ellie My Love"	Southern All Stars	3:21
6.	"Last Rain"	Yasushi Nakanishi	5:19
7.	"Everything"	Misia	6:01
8.	"I am a Thousand Winds"	Man Arai	5:07
9.	"Winter Song"	Dreams Come True	4:39
10.	"Heavenly White"	Exile	5:11

== Charts ==
Chart (2006)	Peak position
Japanese Albums (Oricon)	88

== Release history ==
Covered: Winter release history
Region	Date	Format	Label	Ref(s)
Various	December 22, 2010	CD; Digital download	MSM; Rhythm Zone	
