= The Remedy (Boyz II Men album) =

Studio album by Boyz II Men
- Released: October 25, 2006
- Length: 52:47
- Label: MSM

Boyz II Men chronology
Winter/ Reflections (2005)	The Remedy (2006)	Motown: A Journey Through Hitsville USA (2007)

Singles from The Remedy
- 1. "Muzak" Released: 2006

The Remedy is the ninth studio album by American R&B group Boyz II Men. It was first released through the band's own label MSM Music Group on October 25, 2006, in Japan, followed by an exclusive digital US release through the band's website on February 14, 2007. The band's first regular full-length studio album of new material since the departure of their bass, Michael McCary, in 2003, it peaked at number 16 on the Japanese Albums Chart. The Remedy was preceded by lead single "Muzak".

== Background ==
In 2004, Boyz II Men released the cover album Throwback, Vol. 1, their first independent project following their departure from Arista Records, through their newly found record label MSM Music Group and Koch Records. The following year, they recorded the Christmas album Winter/Reflections. Released in South East Asia only, it reached the top 20 of the Japanese Albums Chart. Disappointed with the ever-changing major label system, the band felt encouraged to record and release another full-length studio album of new material for the Asian market under their MSM umbrella. Thus, The Remedy received a physical release in South East Asia only at first, before it was eventually made available as a download exclusively on boyziimen.com on February 14, 2007.

== Critical reception ==
Professional ratings
Review scores
Source	Rating
AllMusic	2.5/5 stars

AllMusic editor Andy Kellman gave the album two and a half stars out of five. He found that The Remedy "tends to emphasize their warm, romantic, low-key side, though some of the lyrics are among their most sexually forward to date."

== Track listing ==
The Remedy track listing
No.	Title	Length
1.	"Muzak"	4:05
2.	"Gonna Have"	3:23
3.	"Here I Come"	4:37
4.	"The Perfect Love Song"	4:05
5.	"Misunderstanding"	3:57
6.	"Boo'ed Up"	4:03
7.	"You Don't Love Me"	3:46
8.	"The Last Time"	3:37
9.	"Just Like Me"	3:55
10.	"Crush"	3:44
11.	"Ego"	3:50
12.	"Morning Love"	3:44
13.	"Muzak" (featuring Atsushi from Exile)	4:02

== Charts ==
Chart performance for The Remeedy
Chart (2006)	Peak position
Japanese Albums (Oricon)	16

== Release history ==
The Remedy release history
Region	Date	Format	Label	Ref(s)
Japan	October 25, 2006	CD; digital download	MSM; BBMC	
United States	February 14, 2007	CD; digital download	Digital download	MSM
