= End of the Road (Boyz II Men song) =

1992 single by Boyz II Men

- Artwork for North American retail cassette edition, also used for overseas editions

Single by Boyz II Men

from the album Boomerang: Original Soundtrack Album and Cooleyhighharmony (Reissue)
- Released: June 30, 1992
- Recorded: 1992
- Genre: R&B; soul
- Length: 5:48 (album version); 4:13 (single version)
- Label: Motown
- Songwriters: Kenneth "Babyface" Edmonds; Antonio "L.A." Reid; Daryl Simmons
- Producers: Kenneth "Babyface" Edmonds; Antonio "L.A." Reid

Boyz II Men singles chronology
"Please Don't Go" (1992)	"End of the Road" (1992)	"In the Still of the Nite (I Remember)" (1992)

Music video
- "End of the Road" on YouTube

"End of the Road"
"End of the Road" from Cooleyhighharmony (1993 re-release)

"Al Final Del Camino"
Spanish language version from the same album

"End of the Road" is a song by American R&B group Boyz II Men for the Boomerang soundtrack. It was released in June 1992 by LaFace, Arista and Motown, and is written by Babyface, Antonio L.A. Reid and Daryl Simmons. The song achieved domestic and international success. In the United States, it spent a then record breaking 13 weeks at number one on the US Billboard Hot 100, a record broken later in the year by Whitney Houston's 14-week number one hit "I Will Always Love You"; Boyz II Men would later match Houston's record with "I'll Make Love to You", which spent 14 weeks at number one in 1994, and then reclaim the record with "One Sweet Day" (a duet with Mariah Carey), which spent 16 weeks at number one from 1995 to 1996.

"End of the Road" was the number one single of 1992 on the Billboard Year-End Hot 100 Singles of 1992. It was also ranked by Billboard as the sixth most successful song of the decade 1990–1999. Internationally, it reached number one in Australia, the United Kingdom and on the Hot 100 Eurochart, among others. The music video for the song was directed by Lionel C. Martin. "End of the Road" has been certified Platinum by the Recording Industry Association of America for shipments of over one million units in the United States. The song also won Best R&B Performance by a Duo or Group with Vocals and Best R&B Song at the 1993 Grammy Awards.

== Release and chart performance ==
"End of the Road" was released on June 30, 1992. It was released as a single from the Boomerang soundtrack and did not originally appear on Boyz II Men's debut album, Cooleyhighharmony. It was released after all singles from their debut had been released, and was their fifth single overall. However, Cooleyhighharmony was re-issued in 1992 and 1993 to include "End of the Road" due to the success of the single. In 1993 the Spanish version of the song ″Al Final Del Camino″ was released as a single alongside producer Rex Salas.

The single debuted at number 53 on the US Billboard Hot 100 on July 18, 1992, jumping to number 30 the following week. The next week the song reached the top ten at number eight, and reached the top five the week after at number four. The following week, the song peaked at number one, holding the position for 13 consecutive weeks from August 15, 1992 to November 7, 1992. On November 14, the song was finally succeeded by "How Do You Talk to an Angel" by the Heights. It also spent four weeks atop of the Billboard Hot R&B/Hip-Hop Songs chart.

== Composition ==
The song is written and composed in the key of E♭ major and its relative key, C minor (for the pre-choruses) and is set in time signature of 12/8 with a tempo of 50 beats per minute. The group members' vocals span from E♭_{3} to C_{5}.

== Critical reception ==
Larry Flick from Billboard magazine commented, "Good to hear something new by this wonderfully talented group." He described the song as a "retrominded pop/R&B tune", noting that "those now-recognizable harmonies glide over a swaying, doo-wop melody, making the track the perfect complement to a romantic evening. Has the markings of a major multiformat smash." British magazine Music Week wrote, "A superior if stylised ballad, with some classically soulful crooning and a smoothly polished finish, it looks set for major success here too. Cute acapella end adds to appeal." Jonathan Bernstein from Spin called it "lugubrious". In 2024, Forbes magazine ranked "End of the Road" number 38 in their list of "The 50 Best Songs of the 1990s", naming it "a soulful ballad that captured the pain of heartbreak and loss." In 2025, Billboard ranked it number 16 in their "Top 100 Breakup Songs of All Time" list, writing that the "buttery group vocals nail the "unnatural" post-breakup feeling of being apart from someone who still feels painfully familiar to you."

== Music video ==
The accompanying music video for "End of the Road" was directed by American music video director, film director and VJ Lionel C. Martin. It was made in both black-and-white and colors, featuring Boyz II Men performing the song while sitting on chairs in a room, standing outside a train station, or walking in a hallway, interspersed with scenes from the movie Boomerang. The video was later made available in remastered HD on the group's official YouTube channel in 2009, and had generated almost 300 million views in early 2024.

== Awards and nominations ==
1993 Grammy Awards

- Best R&B Performance by a Duo or Group With Vocal – Boyz II Men – "End of the Road" (winner)
- Best R&B Song – Babyface, Daryl Simmons, L.A. Reid – "End of the Road" (winner)

== Track listings ==
- US 7" single
1. "End of the Road" (Radio edit w/ Acapella End) – 4:13
2. "1-4-All-4-1" East Coast Family – 4:14
- Europe/UK/Australia CD
1. "End of the Road" (Pop Edit) – 3:39
2. "End of the Road" (Radio Edit w/ Acapella End) – 4:13
3. "End of the Road" (LP Version) – 5:50
4. "End of the Road" (Instrumental) – 5:16
- Cassette single
1. "End of the Road" (LP Version) – 5:50
2. "End of the Road" (Instrumental) – 5:16

== Charts ==
=== Weekly charts ===
Weekly chart performance for "End of the Road"
Chart (1992–1993)	Peak position
Australia (ARIA)	1
Austria (Ö3 Austria Top 40)	19
Belgium (Ultratop 50 Flanders)	3
Canada Retail Singles (The Record)	1
Canada Contemporary Hit Radio (The Record)	1
Canada Top Singles (RPM)	3
Denmark (IFPI)	6
Estonia (Eesti Top 20)	10
Europe (Eurochart Hot 100)	1
Europe (European Dance Radio)	10
Europe (European Hit Radio)	5
France (SNEP)	7
France Airplay (SNEP)	16
Germany (GfK)	6
Ireland (IRMA)	1
Israel (Israeli Singles Chart)	2
Mexico (AMPROFON)	1
Netherlands (Dutch Top 40)	1
Netherlands (Single Top 100)	1
New Zealand (Recorded Music NZ)	1
Norway (VG-lista)	3
Panama (El Siglo de Torreón)	7
Portugal (AFP)	2
Spain Airplay (Top 40 Radio)	29
Sweden (Sverigetopplistan)	2
Switzerland (Schweizer Hitparade)	7
UK Singles (Official Charts)	1
UK Airplay (Music Week)	1
UK Dance (Music Week)	21
US Billboard Hot 100	1
US Adult Contemporary (Billboard)	35
US Hot R&B/Hip-Hop Songs (Billboard)	1
US Pop Airplay (Billboard)	1
US Rhythmic Airplay (Billboard)	1
US Cash Box Top 100	1
Zimbabwe (ZIMA)	1

=== Year-end charts ===
1992 annual chart performance for "End of the Road"
Chart (1992)	Position
Australia (ARIA)	3
Belgium (Ultratop 50 Flanders)	74
Brazil (Crowley)	2
Canada Top Singles (RPM)	33
Europe (Eurochart Hot 100)	39
Europe (European Dance Radio)	14
Europe (European Hit Radio)	33
Israel (Israeli Singles Chart)	15
Netherlands (Dutch Top 40)	9
Netherlands (Single Top 100)	18
New Zealand (RIANZ)	4
Sweden (Topplistan)	18
UK Singles (OCC)	6
UK Airplay (Music Week)	3
US Billboard Hot 100	1
US Hot R&B Singles (Billboard)	4
US Cash Box Top 100	1

1993 annual chart performance for "End of the Road"
Chart (1993)	Position
Germany (Media Control)	100
Netherlands (Single Top 100)	73
New Zealand (RIANZ)	38
Sweden (Topplistan)	85

=== Decade-end charts ===
1990s decade-end chart performance for "End of the Road"
Chart	Position
Ireland (IRMA)	30
Netherlands (Dutch Top 40)	72
US Billboard Hot 100	6

=== All-time charts ===
All-time chart performance for "End of the Road"
Chart (1958–2018)	Position
US Billboard Hot 100	55

== Certifications ==
Certifications for "End of the Road"
Region	Certification	Certified units/sales
Australia (ARIA)	Platinum	70,000^{^}
Netherlands (NVPI)	Gold	50,000^{^}
New Zealand (RMNZ)	2× Platinum	60,000^{‡}
United Kingdom (BPI) Physical	Gold	400,000^{^}
United Kingdom (BPI) Digital	Platinum	600,000^{‡}
United States (RIAA)	4× Platinum	4,000,000^{‡}
^{^} Shipments figures based on certification alone.^{‡} Sales+streaming figures based on certification alone.

== Release history ==
Release dates and formats for "End of the Road"
Region	Date	Format(s)	Label(s)	Ref.
United States	June 30, 1992	—N/a	Motown	
United Kingdom	August 24, 1992	7-inch vinyl; 12-inch vinyl; CD; cassette	Motown	
Australia	September 28, 1992	CD; cassette	Motown	
Japan	October 1, 1992	Mini-CD	Motown	

== Covers ==
The song has been covered by various artists both domestically and internationally including the Korean group BTS and the a cappella country group Home Free. and a punk rock group, Me First and the Gimme Gimmes on their fourth album, Take a Break.

== In popular culture ==
In 2026, the song was parodied in a commercial for Old Spiceas "Mom Song: The End of Adolescents".

== See also ==
- List of Billboard Hot 100 number-one singles of 1992
- List of number-one R&B singles of 1992 (U.S.)
- List of number-one singles in 1992 (New Zealand)
- List of number-one singles from the 1990s (UK)
- List of European number-one hits of 1992
- Dutch Top 40 number-one hits of 1992
- List of number-one singles in Australia during the 1990s
