= It's So Hard to Say Goodbye to Yesterday =

1975 single by G. C. Cameron

Single by G.C. Cameron

from the album Cooley High: Original Motion Picture Soundtrack/G.C. Cameron
- B-side: "Haulin' + Cold Blooded" (instrumental) (by Freddie Perren)
- Released: September 1, 1975
- Length: 3:25
- Label: Motown
- Songwriters: Freddie Perren; Christine Yarian
- Producer: Freddie Perren

G.C. Cameron singles chronology
"If You're Ever Gonna Love Me" (1975)	"It's So Hard to Say Goodbye to Yesterday" (1975)	"Dream Lady" (1976)

"It's So Hard to Say Goodbye to Yesterday" is an R&B song written by American Motown husband-and-wife songwriting team Freddie Perren and Christine Yarian for the 1975 film Cooley High. In the film, the song is performed by Motown artist G. C. Cameron, whose rendition peaked at number 38 on the US Billboard R&B singles chart that same year. Perren also composed the instrumental score for Cooley High, and the B-side to "It's So Hard to Say Goodbye to Yesterday" features two of his score compositions from the film.

== Charts ==
Chart (1975)	Peak position
US Hot Soul Singles (Billboard)	38

== Boyz II Men cover ==
"It's So Hard to Say Goodbye to Yesterday"
- US commercial cassette single

Single by Boyz II Men

from the album Cooleyhighharmony
- Released: August 20, 1991
- Length: 2:47
- Label: Motown
- Songwriters: Freddie Perren; Christine Yarian
- Producer: Dallas Austin

Boyz II Men singles chronology
"Motownphilly" (1991)	"It's So Hard to Say Goodbye to Yesterday" (1991)	"Uhh Ahh" (1991)

American contemporary R&B Motown group Boyz II Men recorded the song in an a cappella rendition 16 years later. Released as a single, Boyz II Men's recording peaked at number one on the US Cash Box Top 100 and number two on the Billboard Hot 100, as well as topping the Hot R&B Singles chart in December 1991. The track, produced by Dallas Austin, was included on Boyz II Men's first album, Cooleyhighharmony (1991), its name a reference to the film from which the song originated. The music video for the song is dedicated to rapper MC Trouble, who died a few months after the album's release, and it featured archive footage of Sarah Vaughan, Jim Henson, Sammy Davis Jr. and Gilda Radner, and several others who had died recently. The song was used in the 1992 action film Lethal Weapon 3, in the funeral scene for Daryl, a 15-year-old gangbanger shot down by Murtaugh.

=== Track listings ===
US cassette single

- A It's So Hard To Say Goodbye To Yesterday (LP Version)
- Album Snippets
- B1 Under Pressure
- B2 Please Don't Go
- B3 Lonely Heart
- B4 Uhh Ahh
- B5 It's So Hard To Say Goodbye To Yesterday

Europe Maxi-CD

1. It's Hard To Say Goodbye To Yesterday (Radio Version) 3:06
2. It's Hard To Say Goodbye To Yesterday (A capella Version) 3:49
3. Album Snippets
- 3a Under Pressure 0:48
- 3b Please Don't Go 1:00
- 3c Lonely Heart 1:00
- 3d Uhh Ahh 1:03

=== Charts ===
==== Weekly charts ====
Chart (1991–1993)	Peak position
Australia (ARIA)	100
Canada Retail Singles (The Record)	5
Canada Contemporary Hit Radio (The Record)	17
Canada Top Singles (RPM)	36
Israel (Israeli Singles Chart)	41
Netherlands (Dutch Top 40)	26
Netherlands (Single Top 100)	21
New Zealand (Recorded Music NZ)	3
US Billboard Hot 100	2
US Hot R&B/Hip-Hop Songs (Billboard)	1
US Cash Box Top 100	1

==== Year-end charts ====
Chart (1992)	Position
New Zealand (RIANZ)	49
US Billboard Hot 100	37
US Cash Box Top 100	16

=== Certifications ===
Region	Certification	Certified units/sales
New Zealand (RMNZ)	Gold	5,000^{*}
United States (RIAA)	Platinum	1,000,000^{‡}
^{*} Sales figures based on certification alone.^{‡} Sales+streaming figures based on certification alone.

=== Release history ===
Region	Date	Format	Label	Ref.
United States	August 20, 1991	—N/a	Motown	
Japan	October 21, 1991	Mini-CD	Motown	
Japan	April 25, 1993	Mini-CD	Motown	
Australia	June 7, 1993	Cassette	Motown	

== Other versions ==
The Flex covered "It's So Hard to Say Goodbye to Yesterday" for the House Party 2 soundtrack album, released in October 1991.

A Cantonese version of "It's So Hard to Say Goodbye to Yesterday" was covered by Jacky Cheung. The song is titled "偷閒加油站" and it is featured on the 1992 album 真情流露.

In Lucifer series 5 episode 15, a version is sung by Ella Lopez (Aimee Garcia) and Lucifer Morningstar (Tom Ellis). It begins with Ella singing in Spanish before Lucifer joins in and they continue in English.

Latin pop group Barrio Boyzz performed the song acapella in Spanish at the Premio Lo Nuestro awards in May 1995 in honor of the late Tejano singer Selena, who was murdered two months prior.

The song was sung by Greg Miller of Kinda Funny fame, in the 2025 Tim Gettys Farewell Tour.

== See also ==
- R&B number-one hits of 1991 (USA)
