= In the Still of the Night (The Five Satins song) =

1956 single by The Five Satins

Single by the Five Satins

from the album The 5 Satins Sing
- B-side: "The Jones Girl"
- Released: 1956
- Recorded: February 1956
- Venue: Saint Bernadette Catholic Church
- Genre: Doo-wop
- Length: 3:02
- Label: Standord; Ember
- Songwriter: Fred Parris
- Producer: Marty Kugell

The Five Satins singles chronology
"All Mine" (1955)	"In the Still of the Night" (1956)	"Wonderful Girl" (1956)

"In the Still of the Nite", also subsequently titled "In the Still of the Night", is a song written by Fred Parris and recorded by his band the Five Satins in 1956. Originally the song was titled "(I'll Remember) In the Still of the Nite" to distinguish itself from Cole Porter's "In the Still of the Night.” Later the title was changed to "In the Still of the Night".

While only a moderate hit when first released (peaking at No. 24 on the national pop charts), it has received considerable airplay over the years and is notable as one of the best known doo-wop songs, recorded by artists such as Boyz II Men and Debbie Gibson. It has been featured in several films and television series, such as The Buddy Holly Story, Dirty Dancing, The Irishman and The Offer.

The Five Satins' original version was included in Robert Christgau's "Basic Record Library" of 1950s and 1960s recordings—published in Christgau's Record Guide: Rock Albums of the Seventies (1981)—and ranked No. 90 on Rolling Stone magazine's list of "the 500 Greatest Songs of All Time".

== Background ==
Parris was inspired to write the song while working guard duty in the U.S. Army, after seeing a pretty woman walk by him that day. Famously, it was recorded in the basement of St. Bernadette's Church in New Haven, Connecticut. Normally, the quintet sang with five singers, but for this recording there were only 4 -- Al Denby (low tenor), Eddie Martin (baritone), Jim Freeman (bass) and Fred Parris. Marty Kugell produced the song. The saxophone solo was played by Vinny Mazzetta of New Haven. The rhythm section was Doug Murray (bass), Bobby Mapp (drums) and Curlee Glover (piano). It was originally released on Kugell's Standord label with the B-side "The Jones Girl", a play on the Mills Brothers' 1954 hit, "The Jones Boy".

When it was released, Parris was in Japan, so the label used another singer, Bill Baker, to promote the single and record more music (Warner, pg. 189). Although the single was only a moderate hit after it was reissued on the Ember label, peaking at No. 24 on the national pop charts and No. 3 on the R&B "race" charts (Billboard's chart designation for R&B at the time), its reputation came to surpass its original chart placement. For three decades, the single almost always topped the influential Top 500 Songs countdown on oldies radio station WCBS-FM. The track sold over 10 million copies in 1987 and 1988 as part of the Dirty Dancing soundtrack. The song was included on the highly influential 1959 LP Oldies But Goodies on Original Sound.

"In the Still of the Nite" is one of the few songs to have charted on the Hot 100 three separate times, by the same artist with the same version each time. After initially reaching No. 24 in 1956, it was released again in 1960 and reached No. 81. Then more than a year later in 1961 it reached No. 99.

== Boyz II Men version ==
"In the Still of the Nite (I'll Remember)"

Single by Boyz II Men

from the album The Jacksons: An American Dream Original Soundtrack and Cooleyhighharmony (1993 re-issue)
- B-side: "Snippets from 'An American Dream'"
- Released: November 10, 1992
- Genre: A cappella
- Length: 2:51
- Label: Motown
- Songwriter: F. Parris
- Producer: Boyz II Men

Boyz II Men singles chronology
"End of the Road" (1992)	"In the Still of the Nite (I'll Remember)" (1992)	"Let It Snow" (1993)

American group Boyz II Men recorded an a cappella arrangement (a full step below the original version, in E) of the song for the soundtrack to the television miniseries The Jacksons: An American Dream. This version reached No. 3 on the US Billboard Hot 100 on January 16, 1993. It also debuted at No. 1 in New Zealand—becoming the band's second chart-topper there—and charted strongly in Australia, Canada, France, and the United Kingdom. It was later added to the 1993 re-release of their debut album, Cooleyhighharmony (1991).

=== Track listings ===
- 7-inch single
1. "In the Still of the Nite (I'll Remember)" (LP version) – 2:51
2. "Snippets from 'An American Dream'" by The Jacksons
- CD maxi
1. "In the Still of the Nite (I'll Remember)" (LP version) – 2:51
2. "Snippets from 'An American Dream'" by The Jacksons
3. "Medley" ("I Want You Back" (live) / "ABC" (live)) by The Jacksons

=== Charts ===
==== Weekly charts ====
Chart (1992–1993)	Peak position
Australia (ARIA)	11
Canada Retail Singles (The Record)	6
Canada Contemporary Hit Radio (The Record)	3
Canada Top Singles (RPM)	23
Canada Adult Contemporary (RPM)	7
Estonia (Eesti Top 20)	16
Europe (Eurochart Hot 100)	65
Europe (European Hit Radio)	34
France (SNEP)	24
France Airplay (SNEP)	36
Germany (GfK)	69
Israel (Israeli Singles Chart)	30
Mexico (AMPROFON)	3
New Zealand (Recorded Music NZ)	1
UK Singles (Official Charts)	27
UK Airplay (Music Week)	25
US Billboard Hot 100	3
US Adult Contemporary (Billboard)	11
US Hot R&B/Hip-Hop Songs (Billboard)	4
US Pop Airplay (Billboard)	2
US Rhythmic Airplay (Billboard)	3
US Cash Box Top 100	3
Zimbabwe (ZIMA)	2

==== Year-end charts ====
Chart (1993)	Position
Australia (ARIA)	63
Canada Adult Contemporary (RPM)	48
New Zealand (RIANZ)	19
US Billboard Hot 100	12
US Adult Contemporary (Billboard)	45
US Hot R&B Singles (Billboard)	46
US Cash Box Top 100	46

=== Certifications ===
Region	Certification	Certified units/sales
New Zealand (RMNZ)	Gold	5,000^{*}
United States (RIAA)	Platinum	1,000,000^{^}
^{*} Sales figures based on certification alone.^{^} Shipments figures based on certification alone.

=== Release history ===
Region	Date	Format(s)	Label(s)	Ref.
United States	November 10, 1992	Cassette	Motown	
Japan	January 25, 1993	Mini-CD	Motown	
United Kingdom	February 15, 1993	7-inch vinyl; 12-inch vinyl; CD; cassette	Motown	

== Other cover versions ==
- The original recording briefly hit the charts again in 1960 and 1961; an instrumental version by Santo & Johnny charted in 1964, and a version from the album Goodnight My Love by Paul Anka did likewise in 1969 (#62 Canada). None of these releases reached the top half of the Billboard Hot 100, however.
- The Crests recorded a version titled "I Remember (In the Still of the Night)" for their 1960 album The Crests Sing All Biggies on Coed Records.
- The song was used in the Walt Disney World attraction The Enchanted Tiki Room (Under New Management).
- "In the Still of the Night" was also recorded by The Beach Boys on their 1976 album 15 Big Ones. Lead vocals were by drummer Dennis Wilson.
- Songwriters Mike Reid and Troy Seals incorporated the song in the 1985 song "Lost in the Fifties Tonight (In the Still of the Night)", performed by Ronnie Milsap. Milsap's song was a number one country hit that year.
- Debbie Gibson recorded the song transposed to C major during her Atlantic-years concert tours and recorded the same arrangement for the Atlantic soundtrack album The Wonder Years — Music from the Emmy Award-Winning Show and its Era (LP 82032).
- A version by Bruce Murray (brother of Anne Murray) reached #74 in Canada in 1979.

== In popular culture ==
The original Five Satins version of the song featured prominently in Martin Scorsese's 2019 epic crime film The Irishman, including the opening scene and end credits. It is the first track on the film's soundtrack album, released by Sony Music on November 8, 2019.

The same version also appears in the second season of the television series Dark Winds.

The song appears in the first episode of the miniseries The Offer.

The original song also appeared in its entirety in David Cronenberg's 1988 psychological horror film Dead Ringers.

The song also appears on the radio of the video game Mafia II.

It also appears briefly in the TV series Gotham.

It also appears in Dirty Dancing.

In the original 1992 broadcasts of the Are You Afraid Of The Dark? episode "The Tale of the Prom Queen" which aired on YTV and Nickelodeon, the song was playing on Ricky's car radio when he arrives at the cemetery as a ghost (having been killed in a car accident on prom night in 1956.) The song was subsequently removed from the episode when it was released on other media formats, likely due to copyright issues.
