= DSW Entertainment =

Entertainment management company

- Company type: Private
- Industry: Entertainment
- Founded: 2005; 21 years ago
- Founder: C. Winston Simone; David Simoné
- Area served: Worldwide

DSW Entertainment, established in 2005 by C. Winston Simone and David Simoné, is an entertainment company working in artist management, music publishing, recorded music, and television and movie production.

== History ==
DSW Entertainment was founded in 2005 by C. Winston Simone and David Simoné, who had previously worked together in 1999 after founding publishing company Deston Songs with songwriter Desmond Child. The company was responsible for the songs “Who Let The Dogs Out” by the Baha Men and “She Bangs” by Ricky Martin in addition to songs for 50 Cent, Celine Dion, Bon Jovi, Aerosmith and LeAnn Rimes.

In 2002, the duo sold a 50% stake in Deston Songs to Warner Music Group. In 2005, they amicably parted ways with Child and founded DSW Entertainment. They formed a partnership with Primary Wave Music to facilitate the acquisition of publishing catalogs.

In 2007, the company executive-produced Boyz II Men’s Motown: A Journey Through Hitsville USA and received two nominations at the 51st Annual Grammy Awards for Best R&B Album and Best R&B Performance By A Duo Or Group With Vocals for “Ribbon In The Sky.”

== Recorded music ==
DSW Entertainment has a joint venture with BMG and a partnership with Sony Masterworks, which includes album projects for Dolly Parton (Blue Smoke), The Piano Guys (Uncharted A Family Christmas and The Piano Guys), Natalie Imbruglia (Male Wilson Phillips (Christmas In Harmony), Band of Merrymakers (Welcome to Our Christmas Party), Bria Skonberg (Bria) and the Broadway Judy Garland musical End of the Rainbow, album Tracie Bennett Sings Judy: Songs From the Broadway Projection End of the Rainbow and Other Garland Classics.

== Management ==
Currently, DSW Entertainment's client roster includes Mike Love and his touring Beach Boys Steven Van Zandt, The Piano Guys, Nik Wallenda, Desmond Child, Wilson Phillips, Jack Savoretti, and Jimmy Webb.

The company have managed artists including Natalie Imbruglia, Nigel Stanford, David Garrett, 4Troops, magician, actor and author Ricky Jay, Stacey Grittith (author of the 2017 best selling fitness book Two Turns from Zero), and jazz singer and trumpeter Bria Skonberg.

== Television ==
DSW Engagement has executive-produced television productions, including Discovery Channel’s limited series Life on a Wire about Nik Wallenda and his family and the science series Danger by Design also about Wallenda.

In 2012, the company also executive-produced the reality show Still Holding On on TV Guide Channel, which documented the comeback effort of popular 90s group Wilson Phillips as well as PBS specials for violinist David Garrett, 4Troops, Wilson Phillips, and The Piano Guys.

In June 2012, DSW Entertainment executive-produced a live ABC special which televised Wallenda's tightrope walk across Niagara Falls where 13.1 million viewers watched him become the first person to ever walk directly over the falls.

In 2013, the Wallenda special Skywire Live attracted 21 million viewers and generated 1.3 million tweets, making it the highest-rated live event ever broadcast on Discovery Channel. The 2014 follow-up special, Skyscraper Live, was Discovery Channel's most-watched telecast of the year.

They were responsible for executive producing Wallenda's Times Square Live in June 2019 and his Volcano Live in March 2020.

== Film ==
DSW Entertainment was among the associate producers for the 2012 film Deceptive Practice: The Mysteries and Mentors of Ricky Jay. The company is currently executive producing a BMG funded documentary, The Mavericks, about the creation of the live music business in the United States, which follows Frank Barsalona and Premier Talent Agency in addition to industry promoters Ron Delsener, Arny Granat and Bill Graham.
