= Now That's What I Call the USA: The Patriotic Country Collection =

Compilation album by Various artists
- Released: June 15, 2010
- Recorded: 1984–2009
- Genre: Country
- Length: 62:49
- Label: EMI

Series chronology
Now That's What I Call Music! 34 (2010)	Now That's What I Call the USA: The Patriotic Country Collection (2010)	Now That's What I Call Music! 35 (2010)

Now That's What I Call the USA: The Patriotic Country Collection was released on June 15, 2010. It appeared on the Billboard 200 chart in 2010 at #43.

== Track listing ==
No.	Title	Artist	Length
1.	"Only in America"	Brooks & Dunn	4:31
2.	"My Town"	Montgomery Gentry	4:26
3.	"All-American Girl"	Carrie Underwood	3:32
4.	"Fast Cars and Freedom"	Rascal Flatts	4:21
5.	"Back Where I Come From"	Kenny Chesney	3:54
6.	"If You're Reading This"	Tim McGraw	4:06
7.	"American Child"	Phil Vassar	3:09
8.	"Born Country"	Alabama	3:18
9.	"All American Country Boy"	Alan Jackson	3:19
10.	"Guys Like Me"	Eric Church	3:12
11.	"Country Man"	Luke Bryan	3:10
12.	"The Bumper of My SUV"	Chely Wright	4:40
13.	"Arlington"	Trace Adkins	4:08
14.	"Some Gave All"	Billy Ray Cyrus	4:06
15.	"Courtesy of the Red, White, and Blue"	4troops	3:16
16.	"God Bless the USA"	Lee Greenwood	3:09
17.	"The Star-Spangled Banner" (Bonus Track)	4troops	2:24

== Chart performance ==
Chart (2010)	Peak position
U.S. Billboard 200	43
U.S. Billboard Top Country Albums	7
