= C. Winston Simone =

American entertainment executive

C. Winston Simone is an American entertainment executive, best known for being one of the founders and a principal of DSW Entertainment, an entertainment company specializing in artist management, music publishing, recorded music, and television and movie production.

== Career ==
Simone began his career in the music industry in 1978 as the manager of rock duo Jan and Dean. As manager he set up the duo's tour with the Beach Boys in 1978.

In 1980, Simone became the manager of Desmond Child. Since then, they have worked on more than 75 Top 40 hits written and/or produced by Child, including “Livin’ La Vida Loca,” “Living on a Prayer,” and “Dude (Looks Like a Lady).”

He’s also managed Michael Feinstein, Carly Simon, Joe Jackson, Michael Beinhorn, Curtis Stigers, Karla DeVito, Emo Philips, Judy Tenuta, Ricky Jay, and Gilbert Gottfriend, and noted alt-rock group Too Much Joy.

In 1999, he teamed up with David Simoné and Child to form the publishing company Deston Songs. In 2005, he and Simoné amicably parted ways with Child after selling Deston Songs to Warner Music Group. Afterwards, Simone and Simoné formed DSW Entertainment, which, in partnership with Primary Wave Music, has executive produced projects from artists such as Dolly Parton and The Piano Guys as well as manage artists as well as executive-produce television projects centering around Nik Wallenda’s daredevil stunts, 90s group Wilson Phillips’ comeback effort and several PBS concert specials.

In 2016, he worked with The Piano Guys on their album Uncharted, which debuted at No. 15 on the Billboard 200 chart and No. 1 on the Billboard Classical Albums chart. He also worked with jazz singer and trumpeter Bria Skonberg on her 2016 album Bria, which reached No. 8 on the Billboard Jazz Albums chart and her 2017 album With A Twist. He also worked on the album Welcome to Our Christmas Party by holiday supergroup Band of Merrymakers, which featured Lady A, Semisonic, Evanescence, Lifehouse, Sugar Ray, 311, and more.

Simone has executive produced television specials for his clients on BBC, HBO, PBS and Cinemax. Currently, DSW Entertainment's client roster includes Mike Love and his touring Beach Boys, Steven Van Zandt, The Piano Guys, Nik Wallenda, Desmond Child, Wilson Phillips, Jack Savoretti, and Jimmy Webb.
