= Danger by Design =

Danger by Design may refer to:

- Nancy Drew: Danger by Design, a computer video game of the Nancy Drew Interactive games
- Danger by Design, a television reality series aired on the Science Channel, that was renamed Nik Wallenda: Beyond Niagara after two episodes
