= I Can't Make You Love Me =

1991 single by Bonnie Raitt

Single by Bonnie Raitt

from the album Luck of the Draw
- Released: 1991
- Genre: Pop
- Length: 5:33
- Label: Capitol
- Songwriters: Mike Reid; Allen Shamblin
- Producers: Bonnie Raitt; Don Was

Bonnie Raitt singles chronology
"Something to Talk About" (1991)	"I Can't Make You Love Me" (1991)	"Not the Only One" (1992)

Music video
- "I Can't Make You Love Me" by Bonnie Raitt on YouTube

"I Can't Make You Love Me" is a song written by Mike Reid and Allen Shamblin and recorded by American singer Bonnie Raitt for her eleventh studio album, Luck of the Draw (1991). Released as the album's second single in 1991, "I Can't Make You Love Me" became one of Raitt's most successful singles, reaching the top-20 on the Billboard Hot 100 chart and the top-10 on the Adult Contemporary chart.

In August 2000, Mojo magazine voted "I Can't Make You Love Me" the eighth best track on its The 100 Greatest Songs of All Time list. The song was ranked at number 339 on the Rolling Stone magazine's 2004 list of The 500 Greatest Songs of All Time, later placing at number 372 on the 2021 ranking. On November 27, 2016, the Grammy Hall of Fame announced its induction, along with that of another 24 songs.

== Writing and recording ==
"I Can't Make You Love Me" was written by Nashville writers Mike Reid and Allen Shamblin, who were well-noted for their successes in the country music arena. The song was rewritten many times before being finalized, months later. "We wrote, most every week, in Mike's basement," Shamblin told Peter Cooper in an interview with The Nashville Tennessean. "And we'd worked on this song for more than six months. One day, he said, 'Come up to the living room,' where his piano was. He sat down and started playing this melody, and it was one of the most moving pieces of music I'd heard. I mean, it hit me in a hard way ... Instantly, I knew it was the best thing I'd ever been a part of." Reid and Shamblin were both country music songwriters, who according to some accounts originally wrote the song as a fast, bluegrass number. Upon slowing down the tempo considerably, they realized the song gained considerable power and thought about giving the song to one of three artists: Bonnie Raitt, Bette Midler or Linda Ronstadt. Eventually, the song made its way to Raitt, who recorded the track for her eleventh studio album, Luck of the Draw (1991). Raitt co-produced the song with Don Was, while Bruce Hornsby provided a piano accompaniment along with drummer Tony Braunagel and longtime Bonnie Raitt bassist James "Hutch" Hutchinson.

== Composition and inspiration ==
According to Reid and Shamblin, the idea for the song came from an article about alcoholism in The Tennessean:

The way I remember what was said in the story, there was a guy living under a bridge, somewhere close to downtown Nashville, and in the story, he said his wife came to pick him up, under the bridge, and took him down to the courthouse to get a divorce. And he said, "We hugged, and we cried, and then we went through the divorce." And he said, "You know, you just can’t make a woman love you."

— Shamblin, Interview in Stereogum (2016)

The Tennessean article attributes the quote to another homeless person, an unnamed Vietnam veteran, who hears the story and opines, "You can’t make a damn woman love you if she don’t."

Another possible origin story for the song appears in the book 1001 Songs:

At home in Nashville one day, former football star Mike Reid read a story in the morning paper. A local man had been arrested for getting drunk and shooting his girlfriend's car. When asked what he had learnt from his experience he replied, "I learned, your Honour, that you can't make a woman love you if she don't".

A pensive ballad, "I Can't Make You Love Me" was recorded against a quiet electric piano-based arrangement, with prominent piano fills and interpolations supplied by Bruce Hornsby. Raitt recorded the vocal in just one take in the studio, later saying that it was so sad a song that she could not recapture the emotion: "We'd try to do it again and I just said, 'You know, this ain't going to happen.'"

== Critical reception and accolades ==
"I Can't Make You Love Me" received acclaim from music critics. Stephen Thomas Erlewine of AllMusic praised the track, calling it a "strong song" and picking it as one of the album's best tracks. Steve Hochman of Los Angeles Times hailed the song as one of Raitt's most elegant tracks. Elysa Gardner wrote for Rolling Stone that "Raitt's gorgeously understated rendering of 'I Can't Make You Love Me,' in which sentiments such as 'I will lay down my heart and I'll feel the power/But you won't' are delivered with a quiet resignation that's worth a hundred glissandi in emotional weight."

"I Can't Make You Love Me" entered many lists of the greatest songs of all time. In 2000, Mojo magazine placed it at number 8 on its "100 Greatest Songs of All Time" list. The song is also ranked No. 339 on the Rolling Stone magazine's list of The 500 Greatest Songs of All Time. The website "Ultimate Classic Rock" placed the song at number 24 on their "25 Saddest Songs Ever", praising Bonnie Raitt vocals, writing that "she sings in one of her most impassioned vocals ever. There's real ache in every word that drips from her pained lips."

The song's popularity helped solidify her remarkable late-in-career commercial success that had begun two years before. In the time since, "I Can't Make You Love Me" has gone on to become a pop standard and a mainstay of adult contemporary radio formats. For Raitt, the song was notoriously difficult to sing, due to its required vocal range, difficult phrasing and breathing, and the emotional content involved. At the televised Grammy Awards of 1992 Raitt performed it in an even more austere setting than on record, with just her and Hornsby highlighted. As she negotiated the final vocal line, she let out a big audible and visible sigh of relief that she had successfully gotten through it. Her live performance of the song was released on the 1994 album Grammy's Greatest Moments Volume III. Raitt has continued to sing the song in all her concert tours:

I mean, 'I Can't Make You Love Me' is no picnic. I love that song, so does the audience. So it's almost a sacred moment when you share that, that depth of pain with your audience. Because they get really quiet, and I have to summon ... some other place in order to honor that space.

— Raitt, 2002 NPR interview

== Music video ==
The video for this song uses the shorter single version of the song. Filmed in color, but transferred to video for black-and-white, with vibrant lighting effects, it features Raitt performing the song in front of a curtain with a silhouette of a pianist in the background (played by Bruce Hornsby, who also recorded the piano part on the record). In other scenes, a scorching fire takes place outdoors with many shadows of trees, branches, and people seen swaying to the song's rhythm. The music video was directed, photographed and edited by the director/photographer/illustrator Matt Mahurin, who has directed videos for artists including U2, Peter Gabriel, R.E.M. and Sting.

== Chart performance ==
The song was a big hit for Raitt, reaching number 18 on the Billboard Hot 100 and number 6 on the Billboard Adult Contemporary chart. The song placed at number 100 on the Billboard Year-End chart of 1992. In New Zealand, the song was Raitt's highest charting-single, reaching number 22, while in Netherlands, the song charted moderately at number 43.

== Charts ==
=== Weekly charts ===
Chart (1991–1992)	Peak position
Australia (ARIA)	77
Canada RPM Adult Contemporary	4
Canada RPM Top Singles	40
Netherlands (Single Top 100)	43
New Zealand (Recorded Music NZ)	22
UK Singles (OCC)	50
US Billboard Hot 100	18
US Adult Contemporary (Billboard)	6
US Cash Box Top 100	7

=== Year-end charts ===
Chart (1992)	Position
US Billboard Hot 100	100
US Adult Contemporary (Billboard)	17

== George Michael version ==
"I Can't Make You Love Me"
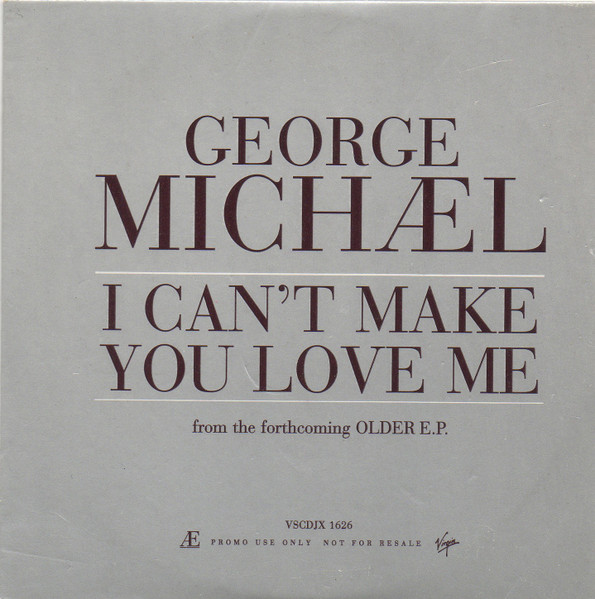
- British promo-only CD artwork

Single by George Michael
- A-side: "Older"
- Released: January 13, 1997
- Length: 5:23
- Label: Virgin; Aegean
- Songwriters: Mike Reid; Allen Shamblin
- Producer: George Michael

George Michael singles chronology
"Spinning the Wheel" (1996)	"Older" / "I Can't Make You Love Me" (1997)	"Star People '97" (1997)

Live video
- "I Can't Make You Love Me" (live, MTV Unplugged) by George Michael on YouTube

Audio
- "I Can't Make You Love Me" (album version) by George Michael on YouTube

English singer George Michael covered "I Can't Make You Love Me" and released it on January 13, 1997, as a double A-side with "Older", serving as the fourth single from Michael's third studio album, Older. Michael's version was also included on his compilation Ladies & Gentlemen: The Best of George Michael (1998). "Older" / "I Can't Make You Love Me" reached number three on the UK Singles Chart.

=== Background and release ===
After the release of his second studio album, Listen Without Prejudice Vol. 1 (1990), George Michael started a legal battle with his label, Sony Music, declaring his contract was financially inequitable and creatively stifling. Michael sued Sony to end his contract, leading to a long and costly legal battle that ended in 1995, with Michael signing to the newly launched DreamWorks Records label in the United States and Virgin in the rest of the world. In 1996, the singer released the song "Jesus to a Child", which became a huge hit worldwide, followed by "Fastlove" and "Spinning the Wheel", which also became successful songs from his third studio album, Older (1996).

While choosing the fourth single from the album, the title track "Older" was announced as the chosen one, with an EP titled the Older EP being released to promote the song. The EP features four tracks, including "Older", "The Strangest Thing" (also from the album Older) and two covers: the famous Brazilian song "Desafinado" and Bonnie Raitt's "I Can't Make You Love Me", which became the official B-side of the single. Since it was released as a B-side to "Older", "I Can't Make You Love Me" also entered the UK Singles Chart at number three.

=== Charts ===
==== Weekly charts ====
Chart (1997)	Peak position
Scottish Singles Sales (Official Charts)	6
UK Singles (Official Charts)	3

==== Year-end charts ====
Chart (1997)	Position
UK Singles (OCC)	85

=== Certifications ===
Region	Certification	Certified units/sales
United Kingdom (BPI)	Silver	200,000^{‡}
^{‡} Sales+streaming figures based on certification alone.

== Boyz II Men version ==
"I Can't Make You Love Me"

Single by Boyz II Men

from the album Love
- Released: October 27, 2009
- Genre: R&B
- Length: 5:17
- Label: Decca; UMTV
- Songwriters: Mike Reid; Allen Shamblin

Boyz II Men singles chronology
"Mercy Mercy Me (The Ecology)" (2008)	"I Can't Make You Love Me" (2009)	"Iris" (2009)

Audio
- "I Can't Make You Love Me" by Boyz II Men on YouTube

American R&B vocal group Boyz II Men recorded "I Can't Make You Love Me" for their third cover album, Love (2009). Their version was released as the album's first single on October 27, 2009. Having a more R&B approach, "I Can't Make You Love Me" received generally favorable reviews from music critics, while it has achieved minor success on the Billboard's Hot R&B/Hip-Hop Songs chart.

=== Background and release ===
After releasing their second cover album in 2007, Motown: A Journey Through Hitsville USA, which was well received by critics, but failed to produce a successful single, the band announced plans for a new cover album, that features cover versions of songs by "artists I don't think people would expect us to cover," according to member Shawn Stockman. On October 23, 2009, "I Can't Make You Love Me" was announced as Love's lead-single. The song was later released on October 27, 2009, through iTunes Store. For the band members, "We wanted to stay true to our roots, and it's a very beautiful song. And with our sound, we gave it an R&B twist. It's always been a favorite of ours, and we hope people will fall in love with it again."

=== Reception ===
A writer for Soul Bounce wrote that "The biggest surprise on this album is the bluesy interpretation of Bonnie Rait's country hit, 'I Can't Make You Love Me'. Starting with strong lyrics and a deep fried instrumental, the Boyz make this song their own with their unique flow providing good contrast to a familiar melodic line." Los Angeles Theatre called it an "impassioned" performance. On the charts, the song performed very modestly, reaching number 75 on the Hot R&B/Hip-Hop Songs chart.

=== Charts ===
Chart (2009)	Peak position
US Hot R&B/Hip-Hop Songs	75

== Adele version ==
"I Can't Make You Love Me"

Song by Adele

from the album Live at the Royal Albert Hall
- Recorded: September 22, 2011
- Venue: Royal Albert Hall (London, England)
- Genre: Soul
- Length: 3:39
- Label: XL; Columbia; Sony
- Songwriters: Mike Reid; Allen Shamblin

In 2011, English singer Adele covered "I Can't Make You Love Me" for her first live album, Live at the Royal Albert Hall (2011). The song was acclaimed by music critics, who praised Adele's delivery and vocals. The song has charted on the UK Singles Chart, reaching the top-forty, although it was never released as a single.

=== Background and live performances ===
In addition to receiving positive reviews from music critics, Adele's second album 21 became one of the most successful albums of the 2010s, being the biggest selling musical release for both 2011 and 2012 and entering the Guinness World Records. While promoting the album and its third single, "Set Fire to the Rain", Adele performed on the iTunes Festival London 2011. On the setlist, Adele performed tracks from 21 and a cover of "I Can't Make You Love Me". Before performing the track, Adele stated that it was one of her favorite songs and described it as "perfect in every way". She added that Bonnie Raitt has a "stunning voice" and went on to compliment the lyrics, calling them "mind-blowing".

After the positive response of the iTunes Festival performance, Adele covered once again the track, during her first live album, Live at the Royal Albert Hall, recorded on September 22, 2011. She made further comment over the song, saying, "It blows me away" and further adding that she thought the song was "incredibly moving". Adele also commented on the emotions the song gives her, saying, "It makes me really, really happy and really, really devastated and depressed at the same time. It makes me think of my fondest and best times in my life, and it makes me think of the worst as well, and combined, probably is a recipe for disaster, but I do love this song. It's just fucking stunning."

=== Critical reception ===
While reviewing her iTunes Festival performance, David Smyth of London Evening Standard wrote that Adele sang the song "with raw expressiveness." Andrew Leahey of AllMusic wrote that the cover "made all the more tender by the rarely heard frailties in Adele's voice." Donald Gibson of Seattle Pi wrote that "she breathes new life into Bonnie Raitt's 'I Can't Make You Love Me,' with similar intimacy and conviction."

While reviewing her Live at the Royal Albert Hall DVD, critics lauded Adele's rendition. Andy Gill of The Independent called it an "impassioned version," while Alex Young of Consequence of Sound named it "heartfelt and stunning." Kit O'Toole of Blogcritics praised her rendition, writing that it "retains its heart-wrenching, devastating mood thanks to Adele's multi-layered voice. Hearing her perform this song, one would imagine her as an older woman who has survived lifelong heartaches instead of a 23-year-old." Maria Schurr of PopMatters lauded the covers (Raitt's "I Can't Make You Love Me" and Bob Dylan's "Make You Feel My Love") on the live album, naming "the most successful," writing that "both seem deeply heartfelt, like Adele understands, and is the only one who can make these words that are not hers ring true." Chris Willman of The Wrap called it "a classic of unrequited love that you'd have to swear she wrote if Bonnie Raitt hadn't turned it into the ultimate female weepie back when Adele was 2."

=== Chart performance ===
Despite not being released as a single, "I Can't Make You Love Me" debuted at number 53 on the UK Singles Chart week of September 30, 2012. It later peaked at number 37, on the following week, October 6, 2012, becoming her eighth top-forty song and first non-single top-forty hit.

Chart (2012)	Peak position
Irish Singles Chart	78
Scottish Singles Chart	34
UK Singles Chart	37

== Priyanka Chopra version ==
"I Can't Make You Love Me"

Single by Priyanka Chopra
- Released: April 22, 2014
- Genre: Electropop; EDM
- Length: 3:38
- Label: 2101; DesiHits; Interscope
- Songwriters: Mike Reid; Allen Shamblin
- Producer: Manual "DJ Manian" Reuter

Priyanka Chopra singles chronology
"Exotic" (2013)	"I Can't Make You Love Me" (2014)

Music video
- "I Can't Make You Love Me" by Priyanka Chopra on YouTube

In 2014, Indian actress and singer Priyanka Chopra recorded a version of "I Can't Make You Love Me" for her debut studio album. Speaking about the song, Chopra said "This is one of my favorite tracks on the album. It's my ode to a classic, a song that I love, and one that says so much – this is for the actor in me." Chopra's version of the song incorporates electronic dance music (EDM) and electropop in its production, which comes courtesy of German producer Manuel "DJ Manian" Reuter. Andy Gensler from Billboard commented on how different Chopra's version was from the original by Raitt, saying that "Chopra's more uptempo take on the song is more likely to connect with a generation of ravers with no idea of the song's origin" The up-tempo version was demoed by American singer Ester Dean at the request of Interscope Records chairman Jimmy Iovine.

It was released on April 22, 2014, by DesiHits, in association with 2101 Records and Interscope Records. It is the third internationally released single following "In My City" (featuring will.i.am), which failed to achieve airplay in the United States, and "Exotic". In the United Kingdom, "I Can't Make You Love Me" was originally planned to be Chopra's debut single.

=== Promotion and music video ===
Chopra's version of "I Can't Make You Love Me" was used to promote Beats by Dre. In a press release, it was revealed that the song would be used in the launch of a new campaign for the popular Beats Pill XL portable Bluetooth speaker. Chopra and her new track would be featured in the national ad campaign, that ran nationwide from May 1 through May 25.

An accompanying music video was filmed in Los Angeles in February 2014. It was conceptualised and directed by duo Jeff Nicholas and Jonathan Craven of The Uprising Creative. Actor Milo Ventimiglia plays Chopra's love interest and scenes include Chopra throwing coloured paint at Ventimiglia as part of celebrations for the Indian festival of Holi, as well as embraces between the couple and solo scenes with Chopra. According to NDTV, the video charts a fictional relationship that "goes from loving to hellish". Behind the scenes footage was released to Access Hollywood. It premiered in New York City on April 30, 2014. Gensler noted that the video also contained product placement for Nokia and Beats by Dre speakers.

=== Critical reception ===
News18 said, "The singer certainly sounds great, so much that it's almost unbelievable it is Priyanka Chopra. The number is definitely foot-tapping and you're going to be hearing this one at every restaurant and club in the days to come" and added that Chopra had "definitely done a great job recreating the Bonnie Raitt song".

=== Charts ===
Chart (2014)	Peak position
US Hot Dance/Electronic Songs (Billboard)	28
