= Love (Boyz II Men album) =

Studio album by Boyz II Men
- Released: November 24, 2009
- Length: 51:44
- Label: Decca
- Producer: Boyz II Men; Randy Jackson

Boyz II Men chronology
Motown: A Journey Through Hitsville USA (2007)	Love (2009)	Covered: Winter (2010)

Singles from Love
- 1. "I Can't Make You Love Me" Released: October 27, 2009; 2. "Iris" Released: November 16, 2009

Love is the eleventh studio album by R&B group Boyz II Men. It was released by Decca Records on November 24, 2009 in the United States. Like their previous album, Love was produced by Randy Jackson and Boyz II Men. This is their third cover album, following Throwback, Vol. 1 and Motown: A Journey Through Hitsville USA, which were released in 2004 and 2007 respectively. The album is composed of popular love songs of the past. It also features a collaboration with Michael Bublé. The demo version of "Back for Good" was originally recorded with Irish singer, Nadine Coyle. The album sold 15,000 copies its first week.

== Critical reception ==
Professional ratings
Review scores
Source	Rating
AllMusic	2/5 stars

AllMusic editor Andy Kellman gave the album two out of five stars. He found that "early-‘60s R&B, late-‘90s country, and early-‘80s rock are all part of the mix only hints at the randomness of the selections. Despite the range of the sources, Boyz II Men tie it all together, nearly to a fault. The group makes the occasional modification to the originals, like the ticking-clock vocal effect on Cyndi Lauper's "Time After Time"; otherwise, if you know the originals, and you know Boyz II Men, you can play these versions in your head without having heard them."

== Track listing ==
Standard edition
No.	Title	Writer(s)	Original artist(s)	Length
1.	"I Can't Make You Love Me"	Mike Reid; Allen Shamblin	Bonnie Raitt	5:17
2.	"Amazed"	Marv Green; Aimee Mayo; Chris Lindsey	Lonestar	4:18
3.	"If You Leave Me Now"	Peter Cetera	Chicago	4:03
4.	"Misty Blue"	Bob Montgomery	Wilma Burgess; Dorothy Moore	3:44
5.	"Time After Time"	Cyndi Lauper; Rob Hyman	Cyndi Lauper	3:56
6.	"Iris"	John Rzeznik	Goo Goo Dolls	4:08
7.	"Cupid"	Sam Cooke	Sam Cooke	3:49
8.	"In My Life"	John Lennon; Paul McCartney	The Beatles	2:34
9.	"Shining Star"	Leo Graham	The Manhattans	4:06
10.	"Open Arms"	Steve Perry; Jonathan Cain	Journey	3:17
11.	"When I Fall In Love" (featuring Michael Bublé)	Victor Young; Edward Heyman	Nat King Cole	4:24

Bonus track(s)
No.	Title	Writer(s)	Original artist(s)	Length
12.	"Back For Good"	Gary Barlow	Take That	4:11
13.	"Could It Be I'm Falling in Love"	Melvin Steals; Mervin Steals	The Spinners	3:57

== Charts ==
Chart (2009)	Peak position
Japanese Albums (Oricon)	62
UK Albums (OCC)	54
UK R&B Albums (OCC)	14
US Billboard 200	114
US Top R&B/Hip-Hop Albums (Billboard)	14

== Release history ==
Love release history
Region	Date	Format	Label	Ref(s)
Various	November 24, 2009	CD; digital download	Decca	
