= Motown: A Journey Through Hitsville USA =

Studio album by Boyz II Men
- Released: November 13, 2007
- Genre: R&B
- Length: 54:56
- Labels: Decca; UMTV
- Producers: Randy Jackson; Boyz II Men

Boyz II Men chronology
The Remedy (2006)	Motown: A Journey Through Hitsville USA (2007)	Love (2009)

Singles from Motown: A Journey Through Hitsville USA
- 1. "The Tracks of My Tears" Released: 2007; 2. "Just My Imagination (Running Away with Me)" Released: 2008; 3. "War" Released: 2008; 4. "Mercy Mercy Me (The Ecology)" Released: 2008

Motown: A Journey Through Hitsville USA is the tenth studio album by Boyz II Men. It was released on November 13, 2007, by Decca Records. . Produced by Randy Jackson and Boyz II Men, with David Simone and Winston Simone serving as executive producers, the album pays tribute to Motown classics through covers of songs such as "Just My Imagination (Running Away with Me)" by The Temptations, "The Tracks of My Tears" by The Miracles, and "Reach Out I'll Be There" by Four Tops.

The album received generally mixed reviews, earning a Best R&B Album nomination at the 51st Grammy Awards, with critics praising Boyz II Men's signature harmonies but criticizing Motown's faithful covers for lacking originality and inviting unfavorable comparisons to the classic recordings. Commercially, it debuted at number 27 on the US Billboard 200 and number eight on the UK Albums Chart, and earned two nominations at the 51st Annual Grammy Awards, including Best R&B Album. The album's first single, "The Tracks of My Tears," became a top 30 hit on the US Hot R&B/Hip-Hop Songs chart.

== Critical reception ==
Professional ratings
Aggregate scores
Source	Rating
Metacritic	59/100
Review scores
Source	Rating
About.com	1.5/5 stars
AllMusic	3/5 stars
Entertainment Weekly	C−
Vibe	3.5/5 stars

Billboard's Clover Hope praised the collection for its faithful renditions of classic songs, noting that the group's harmonies made them sound as though they were "straight outta Motown." While she found their version of Edwin Starr's "War" less convincing, Hope concluded that the album's lack of innovation "barely matters" because of the group's strong vocal performances. Sarah Rodman from The Boston Globe described Motown: A Journey Through Hitsville USA as a "wholly pleasant" collection, praising Boyz II Men's harmonies while noting that the album stayed very close to the original Motown recordings. Although she questioned the need for such faithful interpretations, Rodman concluded that listeners "could do much worse" if seeking contemporary versions of the classics. Vibe concldued that "the trio's confident take on DeBarge's timeless "All This Love" proves the song deserves a place next to its more celebrated counterparts [...] Their lush signature harmonies remain intact."

Gemma Padley of the BBC praised Boyz II Men's trademark harmonies but felt the album suffered from inevitable comparisons to the original recordings. She described it as "a strong body of songs" that showcases the group's vocal abilities, though she concluded that the covers were "often less than complimentary" when measured against the Motown classics. Writing for The Village Voice, Lex Benaim described the album as a collection of "pleasant but utterly unremarkable" Motown covers. While praising the group's a cappella rendition of "Ribbon in the Sky" as "lush with harmony and rather beautiful," he felt the album's polished smoothness ultimately became monotonous. Jonathan Bernstein of Entertainment Weekly gave Motown: A Journey Through Hitsville USA a C−, criticizing the album for "sleepwalking through" Motown classics.

=== Accolades ===
The album received two nominations for the 51st Annual Grammy Awards (Best R&B Album and Best R&B Performance By A Duo Or Group With Vocals for 'Ribbon In The Sky'.)

== Commercial performance ==
In the United States, Motown: A Journey Through Hitsville USA debuted and peaked at number 27 on the US Billboard 200 chart and number six on the Top R&B/Hip-Hop Albums chart, selling approximately 42,000 copies in its first week. It became Boyz II Men's highest-charting album since Full Circle. In the United Kingdom, the album entered the UK Albums Chartat number eight, becoming the group's second top-ten album and their highest-charting release since their debut album Cooleyhighharmony (1991). On November 30, 2007, it was certified both Silver and Gold by British Phonographic Industry (BPI), recognizing shipments of 100,000 units.

== Track listing ==
International edition
No.	Title	Writer(s)	Original artist(s)	Length
1.	"Just My Imagination (Running Away with Me)"	Norman Whitfield; Barrett Strong	The Temptations	4:25
2.	"It's the Same Old Song/Reach Out I'll Be There"	Brian Holland; Lamont Dozier; Eddie Holland	The Four Tops	3:55
3.	"Mercy Mercy Me (The Ecology)"	Marvin Gaye	Marvin Gaye	3:12
4.	"The Tracks of My Tears"	Marvin Tarplin; Warren Moore; Smokey Robinson	The Miracles	3:24
5.	"Money (That's What I Want)"	Janie Bradford; Berry Gordy, Jr.	Barrett Strong	2:54
6.	"Easy"	Lionel Richie	The Commodores	5:26
7.	"I Was Made to Love Her"	Henry Cosby; Lula Mae Hardaway; Sylvia Moy; Stevie Wonder	Stevie Wonder	3:32
8.	"All This Love"	Eldra DeBarge	DeBarge	5:34
9.	"Ribbon in the Sky" (A Capella)	Stevie Wonder	Stevie Wonder	2:51
10.	"Ain't Nothing Like the Real Thing" (featuring Patti LaBelle)	Nickolas Ashford; Valerie Simpson	Marvin Gaye & Tammi Terrell	2:51
11.	"There'll Never Be" (International bonus track)	Bobby DeBarge	Switch	4:58
12.	"Got to Be There"	Elliot Willensky	Michael Jackson	3:32
13.	"War"	Norman Whitfield; Barrett Strong	Edwin Starr	4:20
14.	"End of the Road" (A Capella) (featuring Brian McKnight)	Babyface; Antonio "L.A." Reid; Daryl Simmons	Boyz II Men	3:57

2008 Japan tour edition bonus tracks
No.	Title	Writer(s)	Original artist(s)	Length
15.	"Just My Imagination (Running Away With Me)" (Acoustic version)	Norman Whitfield; Barrett Strong	The Temptations	4:12
16.	"Mercy Mercy Me (The Ecology)" (Acoustic version)	Marvin Gaye	Marvin Gaye	3:07
17.	"Easy" (Acoustic version)	Lionel Richie	The Commodores	4:45

== Personnel ==
Musicians

- Rob Bacon – guitar (6, 11, 12), acoustic guitar (7, 8), electric guitar (8)
- Vinnie Colaiuta – drums (1–5, 10, 12, 13)
- Luis Conte – percussion (1–5, 7, 10, 12, 13)
- Kenneth Crouch – piano (1, 2, 5, 8, 12), keyboards (5–7, 11–13, 17), B3 (5, 12), Fender Rhodes (3, 4, 10), Wurlitzer (4), clavinet (13)
- James Gamble – drums (6–8, 11)
- Larry Gold – string arrangements (1–3, 6, 8, 10, 12, 15–17)
- Dave Guy – trumpet (2, 6, 8, 10, 11, 13)
- Ian Hendrickson-Smith – baritone saxophone (2, 6, 8, 10, 11, 13), flute (2, 8, 10)
- Randy Jackson – bass (10, 11)
- Aaron Johnson – trombone (2, 6, 8, 10, 11, 13)
- Cornelius Mims – bass (1–8, 12, 13)
- Neal Sugarman – tenor saxophone (2, 6, 8, 10, 11, 13)
- Tim Pierce – guitar (2, 4, 5, 10, 12, 13), electric guitar (3, 16)
- Matt Rollings – piano (3–5, 10–12), keyboards (1, 4, 5, 7, 8, 11, 12), B3 (1, 2, 4, 5, 12), Fender Rhodes (1), Wurlitzer 13), clavinet (13)
- Ramón Stagnaro – acoustic guitar (8)
- Michael Thompson – electric guitar (1, 3, 8, 16), acoustic guitar (1, 8, 15), guitar (4, 6, 10–12), electric sitar (7)

Technical personnel

- Randy Jackson – producer (1–8, 10–13)
- Boyz II Men – producer (1–13)
- Brian McKnight – producer (14)
- David Simone – executive producer
- Winston Simone – executive producer
- Kevin Guarnieri – engineer
- David Swope – engineer
- Alan Armitage – engineer
- Jeff Chestek – additional engineering
- Frank Sutton – additional engineering
- Chris Wood – engineer (14)
- Eric Rennaker – engineer (9)
- Shari Sutcliffe – music contractor
- Mick Guzauski – mixing
- Tom Bender – assistant mix engineer
- Dennis Rivadeneira – assistant mix engineer
- Leon Zervos – mastering
- Keith Gremlin – assistant engineer
- Antonio Resendiz – assistant engineer
- Matt Serrecchio – assistant engineer
- Sean Brennan – assistant engineer
- John Stahl – assistant engineer
- Wanya Morris – assistant engineer

== Charts ==
=== Weekly charts ===
Weekly chart performance for Motown: A Journey Through Hitsville USA
Chart (2007)	Peak position
French Albums (SNEP)	29
Irish Albums (IRMA)	93
Japanese Albums (Oricon)	29
Scottish Albums (Official Charts)	23
UK Albums (Official Charts)	8
UK R&B Albums (Official Charts)	2
US Billboard 200	27
US Top R&B/Hip-Hop Albums (Billboard)	6

=== Year-end charts ===
2007 year-end chart performance for Motown: A Journey Through Hitsville USA
Chart (2007)	Position
UK Albums (OCC)	83

2008 year-end chart performance for Motown: A Journey Through Hitsville USA
Chart (2008)	Position
US Billboard 200	179
US Top R&B/Hip-Hop Albums (Billboard)	46

== Certifications ==
Certifications of Motown: A Journey Through Hitsville USA
Region	Certification	Certified units/sales
United Kingdom (BPI)	Gold	100,000^{^}
^{^} Shipments figures based on certification alone.
