= Rally to Restore Sanity and/or Fear =

October 2010 rally in Washington, D.C

- Poster for the rally
- Date: October 30, 2010
- Location: The National Mall, Washington, D.C.; Satellite rallies in 20 or more U.S. cities including Austin, Texas; Los Angeles; Burlington, Vermont; Chicago; Denver; Honolulu and Boise, Idaho
- Participants: Hosts Stephen Colbert; Jon Stewart Featured guests The MythBusters (Adam Savage and Jamie Hyneman); Don Novello; Sam Waterston; Kareem Abdul-Jabbar Musical performers The Roots and John Legend; 4troops Jeff Tweedy and Mavis Staples; Kid Rock and Sheryl Crow; Ozzy Osbourne, Yusuf Islam and The O'Jays; Tony Bennett
- Website: Official website

The Rally to Restore Sanity and/or Fear was a gathering on October 30, 2010, at the National Mall in Washington, D.C. The rally was led by Jon Stewart, host of the satirical news program The Daily Show, and Stephen Colbert, in-character as a conservative political pundit, as on his program The Colbert Report, both then seen on Comedy Central. About 215,000 people attended the rally, according to aerial photography analysis by AirPhotosLive.com for CBS News.

The rally was a combination of what initially were announced as separate events: Stewart's "Rally to Restore Sanity" and Colbert's counterpart, the "March to Keep Fear Alive". Its stated purpose was to provide a venue for attendees to be heard above what Stewart described as the more vocal and extreme 15–20% of Americans who "control the conversation" of American politics, the argument being that these extremes demonize each other and engage in counterproductive actions, with a return to sanity intended to promote reasoned discussion. Despite news reports' description of the rally as a spoof of Glenn Beck's Restoring Honor rally and Al Sharpton's Reclaim the Dream rally, and the logo's striking similarity to that of the Restoring Honor rally, Stewart insisted the contrary.

== Origins ==
=== Response to Restoring Honor rally ===
On August 28, 2010, the Fox News Channel's Glenn Beck held a "Restoring Honor" rally at the Lincoln Memorial. On the same day, Al Sharpton led a countermarch, called Reclaim the Dream, to mark the 47th anniversary of the historic March on Washington for Jobs and Freedom. According to New York Magazine, discussion for a satirical public event in response took place behind the scenes at Stewart's The Daily Show as early as August 12. Stewart has stated that the rally was never intended to be a means to counter Glenn Beck, but was simply another format for his and Colbert's style of humor, saying "We saw [the Restoring Honor rally] and thought, 'What a beautiful outline. What a beautiful structure to fill with what we want to express in live form, festival form.'" Before any public discussion by Stewart, Colbert, or their staffs, members of the social news website Reddit independently began to discuss the possibility of a Colbert-led rally, often referred to as a "Restoring Truthiness Rally". After the rallies were announced, some news articles credited Reddit for the idea.

=== Announcement ===
Early posters for the then-separate rallies

Stewart first hinted at the event on the September 7 episode of The Daily Show by declaring that "[he would] have an announcement sometime in the near to not so near future." Colbert, in that night's episode of The Report (which aired immediately following The Daily Show), said that he, too, had an announcement to make. In the following days, Stewart and Colbert used their shows to hype their respective announcements, competing over whose would be more significant. The banter finally culminated with Stewart formally announcing the "Rally to Restore Sanity" on the September 16, 2010 episode of The Daily Show; Colbert followed by announcing the "March to Keep Fear Alive" on the subsequent episode of The Colbert Report.

Stewart declared that his rally was intended for the majority of Americans, "the 70–80 percenters," who do not hold extreme political views and lack a voice in the media. To illustrate the point, he unveiled a mock motto for the rally: "Take it down a notch for America." A series of protest sign designs were proposed on the Daily Show featuring messages such as "I disagree with you, but I'm pretty sure you're not Hitler." Colbert responded to Stewart's proposal by challenging the theme of Stewart's rally and justifying his own "March to Keep Fear Alive." Noting that this was not the time to be reasonable, Colbert declared, "Now is the time for all good men to freak out for freedom!"

Oprah Winfrey appeared on The Daily Show via video on October 14, 2010, to award the attending audience free airfare to the rally. The plane tickets were hidden under the audience members' seats in the same fashion as she has given away prizes to her own audience members on The Oprah Winfrey Show. In the episode of the Colbert Report airing immediately afterward, Stephen Colbert also offered tickets to his rally. Arianna Huffington offered to provide free bus rides to the rally. During the show, Colbert also revealed to Stewart that he did not possess a permit to legally organize the "March to Keep Fear Alive," leading Stewart to propose combining the two events into the "Rally to Restore Sanity and/or Fear" that would feature a new combined logo.

=== Response to the announcement ===
On the night following the announcement, the pledged number of attendees to the event reached 69,000 on Facebook. This number far exceeded the 25,000 that the rally organizers had indicated as the estimated number of attendees on the National Park Service application for a rally permit. The demand for hotels during the period of the Rally to Restore Sanity and/or Fear outpaced that of the "Restoring Honor" rally. The rally spawned several grassroots websites and Facebook groups for organizing and discussion, some with more than 10,000 followers. Proposals were made for dozens of sister rallies in other major cities, such as Seattle, Chicago, Austin, and Los Angeles to take place on the same day as the demonstration in Washington, D.C. On September 28, Arianna Huffington announced on The Daily Show that The Huffington Post would provide "as many buses as people to fill them" at a specified meeting place in Manhattan, although her plans were later scaled back and preregistration was imposed.

The Wall Street Journal characterized the Rally as a "send-up" of the Washington Restoring Honor rally led by Glenn Beck and the "Reclaim the Dream" commemorative march led by Al Sharpton on August 28, 2010. The Canadian Press called the Stewart/Colbert rallies a "not-so-gentle" swipe at Glenn Beck's "Restoring Honor" rally. During a town hall event on September 29, President Obama cited the forthcoming rally as representing those people who are concerned with more than just the political beliefs of others, in contrast to "provocative" cable news programs.

Many news organizations sought media credentials to cover the rally. Anticipating staff interest in attending for non-professional purposes, NPR barred staffers from attending the rally in a memo that stated: "NPR journalists may not participate in marches and rallies involving causes or issues that NPR covers, nor should they sign petitions or otherwise lend their name to such causes, or contribute money to them. This restriction applies to the upcoming Jon Stewart and Stephen Colbert rallies." NBC and several other media outlets followed suit. Some barred employees from attending the rally outright, while others such as The Washington Post offered more latitude, telling newsroom managers to differentiate between "participating" and "observing."

=== Charity drive ===
Prior to the announcement of the joint rally, supporters of the movement for a Colbert-led march had begun a drive to raise money for educational charities through DonorsChoose.org, a charitable organization of which Colbert is a member of the board of directors. In the first 24 hours, supporters raised over $100,000. In the days that followed, that total increased to over $250,000, and by the day of the rally over $500,000 had been contributed. Jon Stewart promoted the Trust for the National Mall, urging his viewers to make donations on behalf of the rally. As of October 31, 2010, over $188,000 had been donated to the Trust.

== Rally ==
=== Setting ===
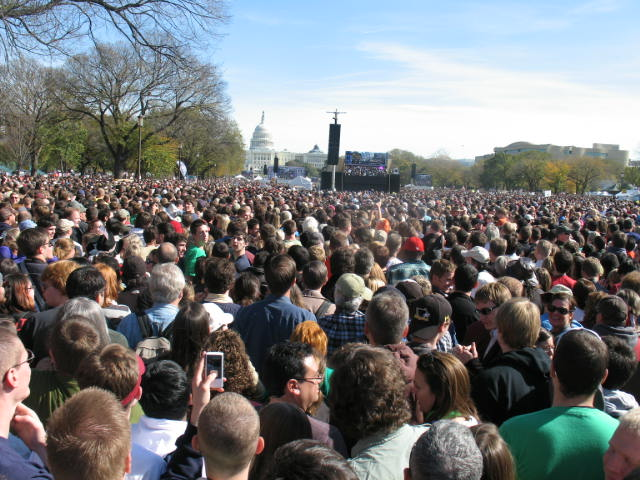
Distant view of stage

As the number of expected participants grew, the rally was moved from the grounds of the Washington Monument to the east end of the Mall facing the Capitol. The stage was on the east side of the rally with an open back, allowing the Capitol building to provide the backdrop for the performances. In order to meet the public safety requirements of the National Park Service permit, the Mall between the Capitol and 14th Street was divided into sections, with access aisles lined by portable fences. Speakers and jumbotron television screens were placed along both the north and south edges to encourage the crowd to spread out rather than press against the main stage.

Portable toilets and first aid stations were also provided. Because the rally was held the day before the previously scheduled Marine Corps Marathon, the rally planners originally requested to share the portable toilets planned for the marathon runners. The marathon organizers refused, so a second set of portable toilets was ordered.

=== Guests ===
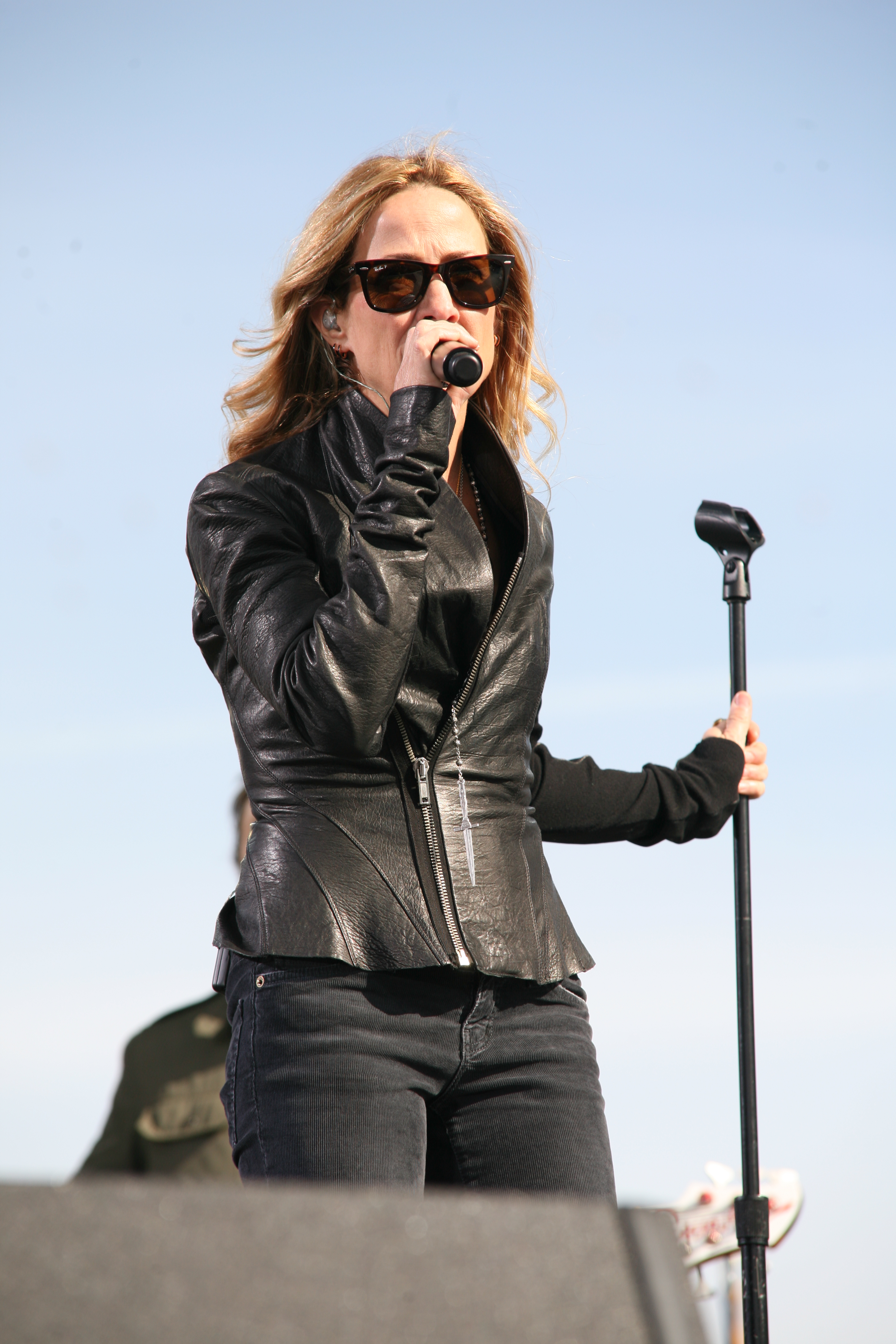
Sheryl Crow, one of several guests at the rally

While both Colbert and Stewart were tight-lipped as to the event's schedule and guests, Metromix's Washington DC website published a tentative schedule on October 27, with guest performers said to be confirmed for the event including musicians Sheryl Crow, the Roots and Jeff Tweedy with Mavis Staples along with actors Don Novello (appearing as Father Guido Sarducci) and Sam Waterston. Other guests included 4troops, Yusuf Islam – formerly known as Cat Stevens, Ozzy Osbourne, the O'Jays, John Legend, Kid Rock, Tony Bennett, MythBusters hosts Adam Savage and Jamie Hyneman, basketball player Kareem Abdul-Jabbar, and R2-D2.

=== Comedy ===
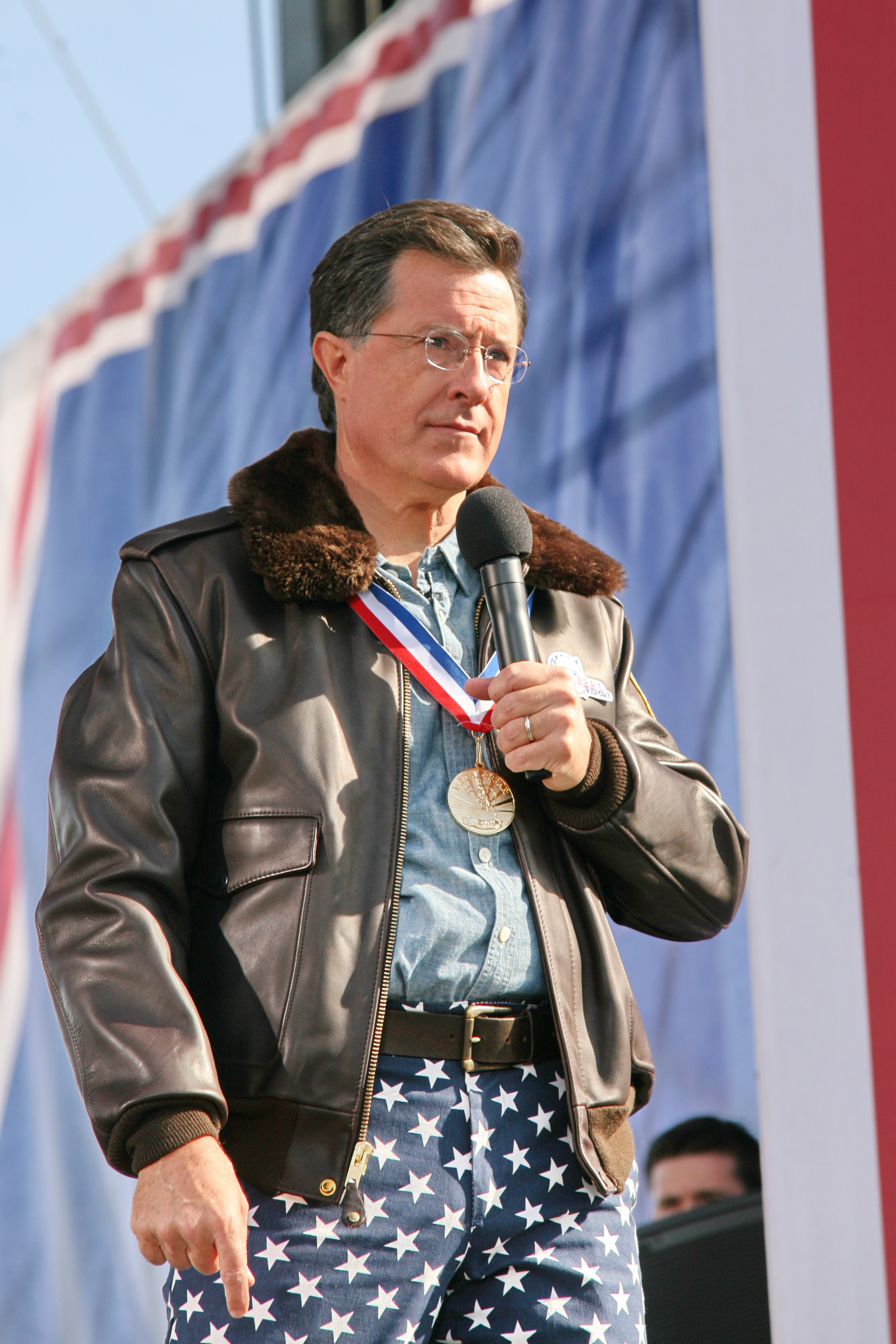
Stephen Colbert on stage

Satirical comedy was woven throughout the rally with Colbert expressing, in parody, that fear was superior to Stewart's reasonableness. The theme started with Colbert—costumed like Evel Knievel—emerging from his "fear bunker" in a capsule reminiscent of the 2010 Chilean miners' rescue. Thereafter, Colbert challenged Stewart point by point, usually claiming victory.

One of their battles was waged over three songs about trains. Stewart started with Islam singing "Peace Train," which was interrupted continually by Colbert-backed Osbourne singing "Crazy Train." The audience held up peace signs for "Peace Train" and horn signs for "Crazy Train." Finally, Stewart and Colbert compromised singing "Love Train" with the O'Jays.

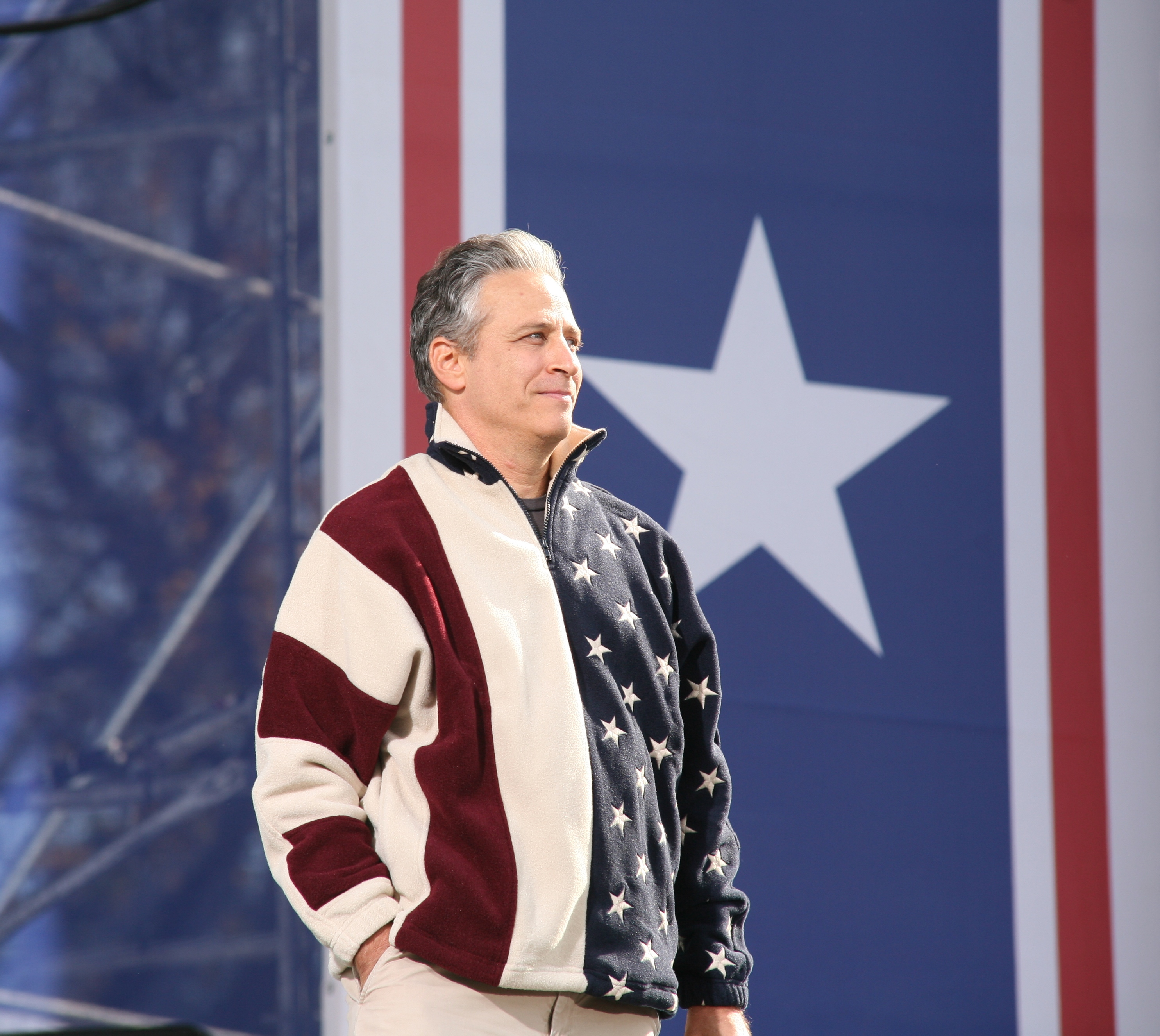
Jon Stewart in American flag 3/4 zip-up

Later, Stewart and Colbert donned matching American flag coats and sang an original song "The Greatest, Strongest Country in the World" with lyrics that reflected common liberal and conservative stereotypes, such as "I love NASCAR halftime shows with tons of TNT. ... My hybrid electric scooter does 100 m-p-g. From gay men who like football ... to straight men who like Glee ..."

In the finale, a giant papier-mâché puppet of Colbert ("Fearzilla") was brought on stage to symbolize his superiority. Peter Pan—played by John Oliver—then appeared and led the crowd in a chant that caused Colbert and his puppet to melt into the stage, thereby handing final victory to Stewart.

=== Medals ===
Stewart gave out "Medals of Reasonableness" cast in bronze with an image of an owl and the Latin motto Sit vis nobiscum, liberally translated by Stewart as "May the Force be with us," to:

- Armando Galarraga for his calm response to the blown call that cost him a perfect game.
- Mick Foley for his contributions outside of wrestling, including his defense of a child mocked for being seen as gay.
- Velma Hart for her reasoned critical questions delivered to President Barack Obama at a town hall.
- Jacob Isom for preventing an evangelist from burning a Qur'an.

Colbert awarded "Medals of Fear" cast with an image of a naked man running with scissors and the Latin motto Cave ne cadmium sit, which Colbert translated as "Warning: May contain Cadmium," to:

- Several news media outlets, collectively, for barring employees from attending the rally on their own time.
- A "tight black T-shirt" that Colbert said belonged to CNN's Anderson Cooper, for always appearing during natural disasters reported on by Cooper.
- Mark Zuckerberg for making Facebook increase fear with regard to Internet privacy.

Zuckerberg's award was presented in absentia. The media outlets' award was accepted on their behalf by "someone with more courage—a seven-year-old girl." Also, videotaped messages were shown of Steven Slater, known from the 2010 JetBlue flight attendant incident, and reality TV star Teresa Giudice, both apologizing for public acts of "unreasonableness."

=== "A Moment of Sincerity" speech ===
After defeating Colbert's "Fearzilla", Stewart closed the rally with a "moment ... for some sincerity" to explain his intentions for the rally:

This was not a rally to ridicule people of faith, or people of activism, or look down our noses at the heartland, or passionate argument, or to suggest that times are not difficult and that we have nothing to fear. They are, and we do. But we live now in hard times, not end times.

He criticized the role the press plays in polarizing political debates, stating that the media—which he described as "the country's 24-hour politico–pundit perpetual panic 'conflict-inator'"—only amplifies problems and no longer makes a distinction between "hav[ing] animus" and "be[ing] enemies." He warned that demonizing opponents and accepting propaganda makes people "less safe, not more" and that "it is an insult, not only to those people, but to the racists themselves who have put in the exhausting effort it takes to hate."

Much of the speech was devoted to the idea that "[m]ost Americans don't live their lives solely as Democrats, Republicans, liberals or conservatives." He spoke on the subject of "reasonable compromises" that happen "every day" between persons of different beliefs, citing as an example traffic merging at the entrance to the Holland Tunnel connecting New York City and Jersey City.

=== Crowd size and television broadcast ===
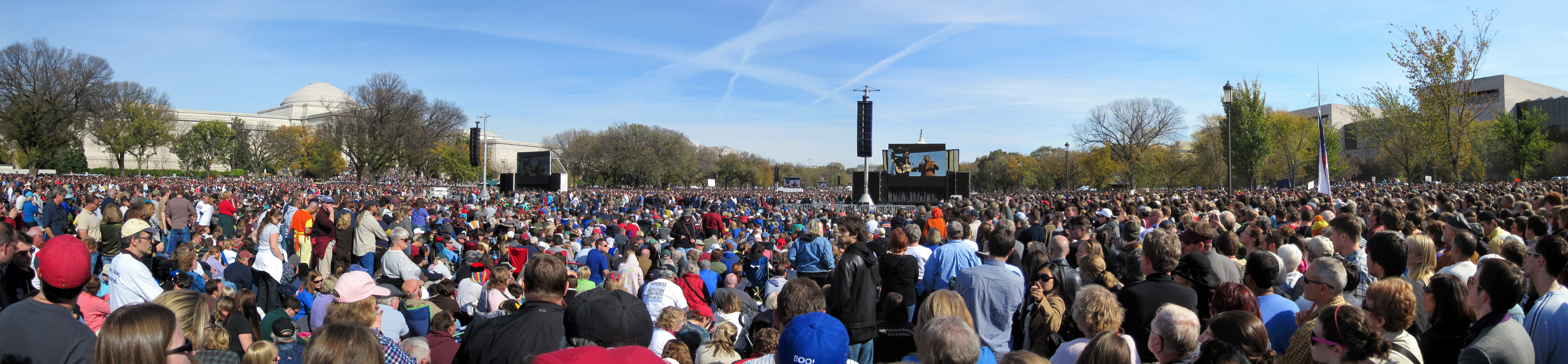
A section of the crowd on the National Mall between the National Gallery of Art on the left, and the Smithsonian Institution's National Air and Space Museum on the right. Jon Stewart satirically estimated the crowd size at 10 million people during the event. Colbert later tweeted that it had been 6 billion.

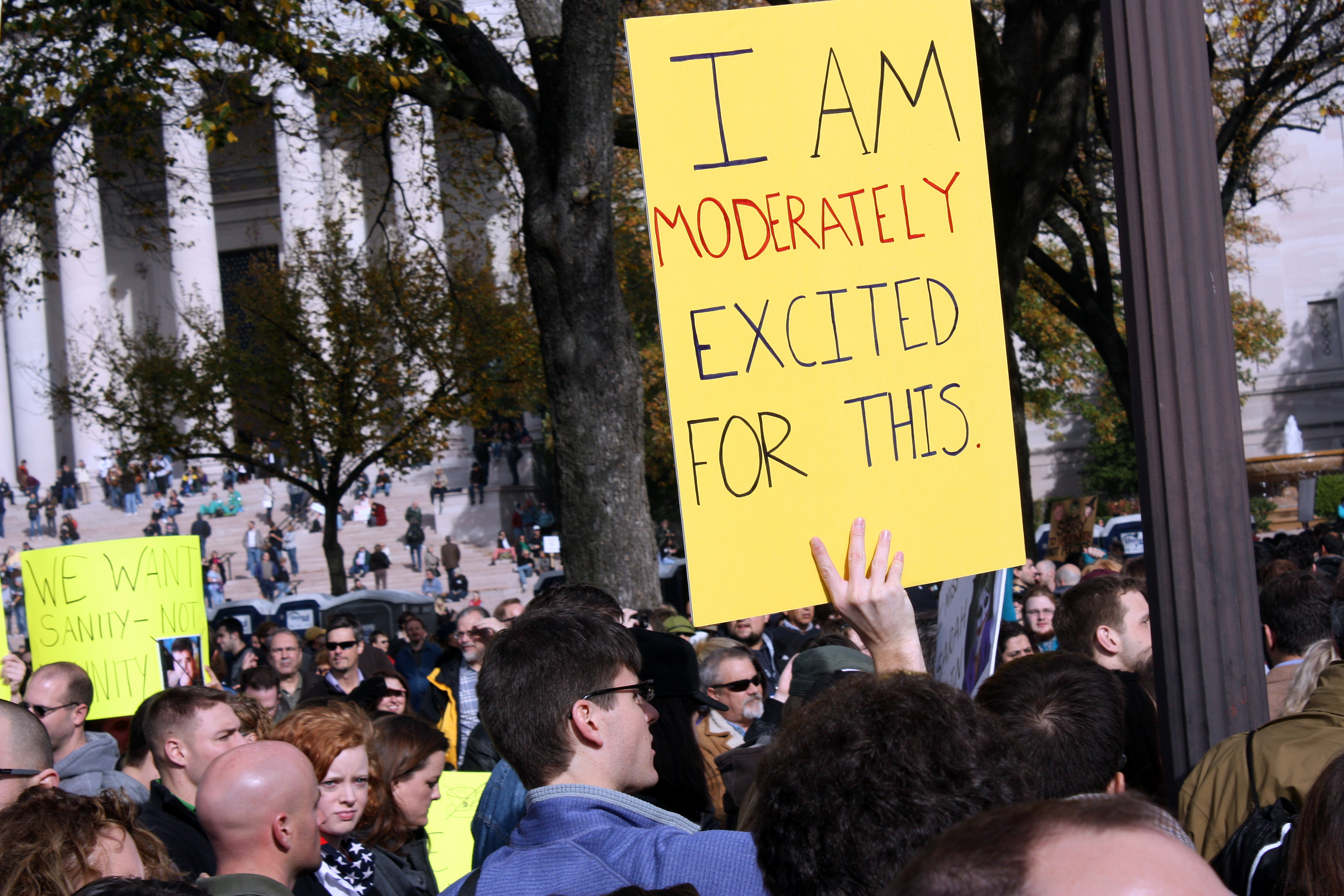
A comedic sign proclaims moderate excitement

An aerial photography analysis commissioned by CBS News and carried out by AirPhotosLive.com estimated the crowd at 215,000 people, plus or minus 10%. In comparison, their estimate for the Restoring Honor rally made using the same methods was 87,000 people, plus or minus 9,000. USA Today, Voice of America and ABC News all referred to the crowd as tens of thousands of people, with Voice of America noting, "the crowd filled the Mall, from almost in front of the Capitol to the Washington Monument."

According to local news outlet TBD TV, "Massive turnout for Saturday's rally quickly overwhelmed the Mall, forcing thousands of people into nearby streets and, eventually, just giving up and leaving." The PA system was criticized for being inadequate for those farther back to hear, with the crowd chanting "louder" several times. Jon Stewart, speaking from the stage, jokingly said there were over 10 million people there, and Stephen Colbert satirically tweeted an estimate of 6 billion.

The Washington Metropolitan Area Transit Authority, which maintained its normal Saturday service schedule, announced that Metrorail ridership set a Saturday record of 825,437 trips, as compared to about 350,000 on a normal Saturday, and beating out the previous record set in 1991 of 786,358 trips during the Desert Storm National Victory Celebration. The record would last more than 6 six years, until it was broken by the 2017 Women's March.

The rally was broadcast live on Comedy Central and C-SPAN. The Comedy Central live broadcast drew 2,000,000 total viewers, with an additional 570,000 live video streams on the Internet.

== Response to rally ==
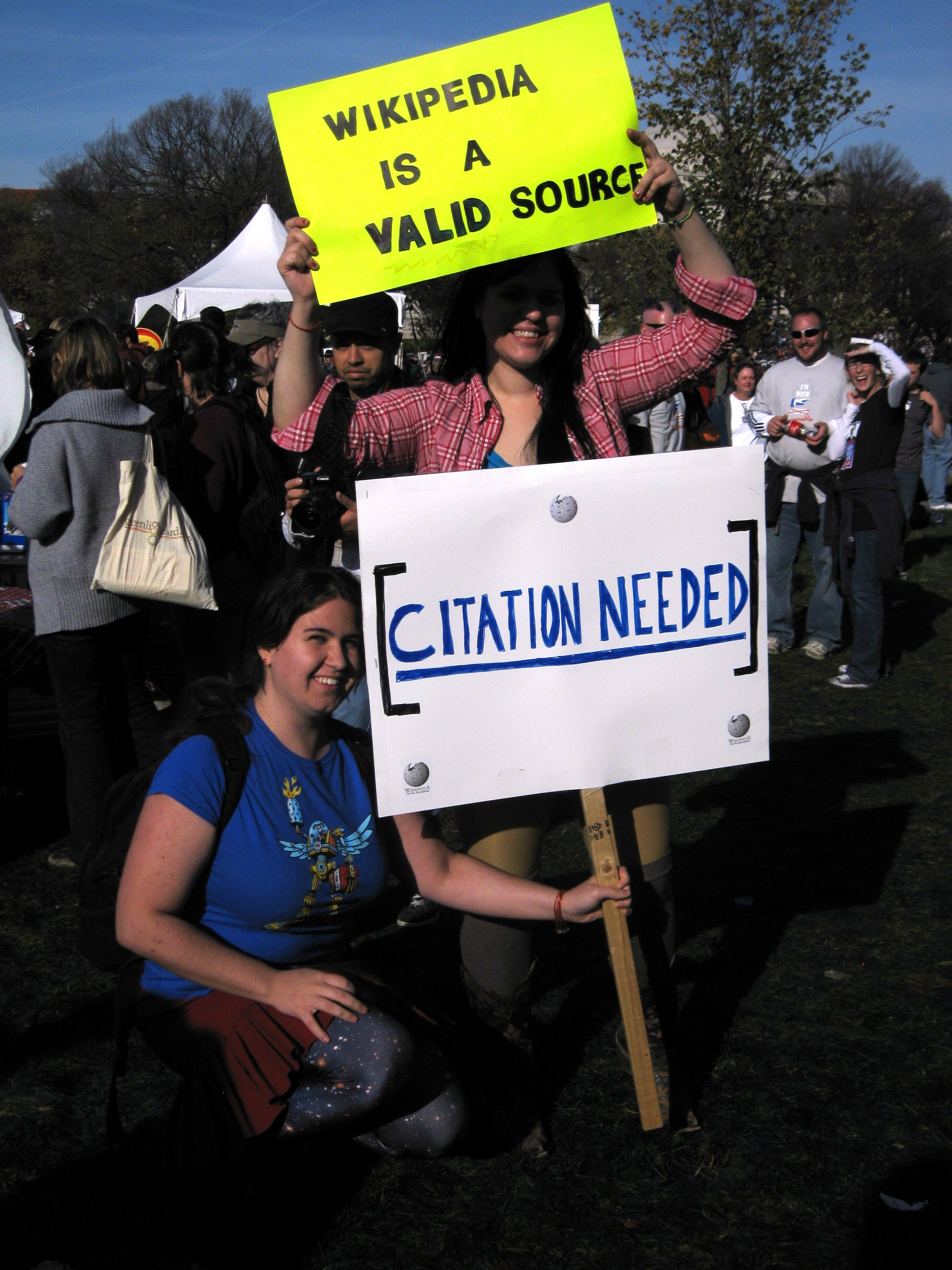
Signs: "Wikipedia is a valid source" and "Citation needed"

Keith Olbermann was prominently featured in a video montage shown at the rally that focused on the anger present in cable news. On November 2, Olbermann announced that he would suspend his "Worst Person in the World" segment on Countdown with Keith Olbermann in the interest of turning down the volume and anger. However, he defended the content of his show by claiming that MSNBC (the network that hosted Countdown at the time) differs from Fox News in that "sticking up for the powerless is not the moral equivalent of sticking up for the powerful." After tallying an online vote among his viewers, Olbermann announced that the segment would return on the November 17 broadcast as the "Not Really Worst Persons in the World." Between the two announcements, Olbermann was suspended by MSNBC on November 5 and re-instated on November 9 over his violation of network policy regarding political donations; the contract between Olbermann and MSNBC would be terminated two months later in January 2011. Olbermann would launch an identically named show with the same segment on Current TV beginning from June 2011, but was terminated again in March 2012.

On Real Time with Bill Maher, Bill Maher criticized the rally, saying that while Stewart and Colbert meant well, the message of the rally promoted a false equivalency between the left and the right, noting, "the big mistake of modern media has been this notion of balance for balance's sake. That the Left is just as violent and cruel as the Right ... there's a difference between a mad man and a madman."

On November 11, Stewart appeared on The Rachel Maddow Show and clarified the message he intended to convey at the rally: that too many have "bought into the idea that the conflict [in America] is left versus right" when the conflict is actually "corruption versus not-corruption" and that "both sides have their ways of shutting down debate."

Several websites, such as The Huffington Post, dedicated a page to collecting "the funniest signs from the rally."

In 2012 Stewart said that at the time that he had invited Yusuf Islam to perform at the rally, he did not know that Yusuf Islam had expressed support for a Fatwa issued against Salman Rushdie. Upon learning about it, Stewart tried to get clarifications from Islam, but the conversation he had with Islam left Stewart unsatisfied.

=== 2020 anniversary ===
On October 30, 2020, Stewart appeared on The Late Show with Stephen Colbert to celebrate the 10th anniversary of the event. Colbert apologized after Stewart said his rally to restore fear "won" in a "shutout". Tony Bennett also appeared to sing "America the Beautiful" but was cut off by Stewart.

== Awards and nominations ==
The rally was nominated for four Daytime Emmy Awards:

- Outstanding Special Class Special
- Outstanding Special Class Writing
- Outstanding Achievement in Technical Direction/Electronic Camera/Video Control
- Outstanding Achievement in Live & Direct To Tape Sound Mixing

== See also ==
- List of political rallies on the National Mall
- National Endowment for the Humanities' Civility Tour
- One Nation Working Together rally
- Pluralistic Rationalism
- List of protest marches on Washington, D.C.
