= Band of Merrymakers =

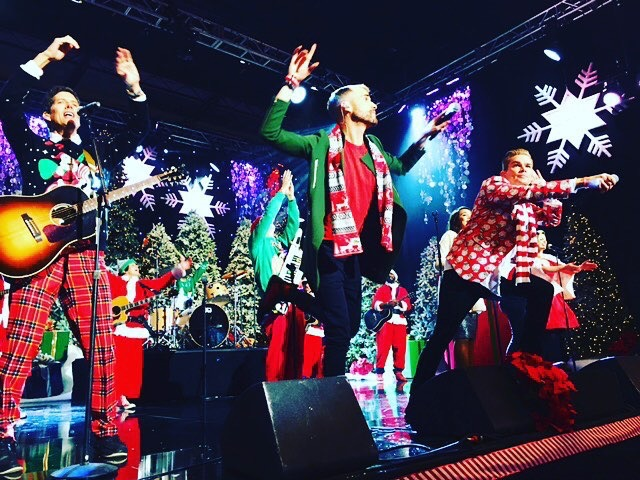
- Band of Merrymakers performing in 2015

Background information
- Genres: Children's music, Christmas music
- Years active: 2014–present
- Labels: The End, Sony Masterworks
- Website: bandofmerrymakers.com

Band of Merrymakers is a holiday music supergroup created by songwriters Sam Hollander and Kevin Griffin in 2014. The group was established with the philanthropic goal of raising awareness and donations for non-profit organizations and charities. The group's debut album, Welcome to Our Christmas Party, was released on October 23, 2015, through Sony Masterworks.

== Conception ==
Songwriters Sam Hollander and Kevin Griffin were discussing holiday music during a songwriting session in 2014. Noticing a lack of philanthropy and originality in holiday songs, they decided to create new songs that capture the spirit of family holidays. Some of their records include Band Aid and Lifebeat's A Very Special Christmas series.

== Release and Promotion ==
=== Release ===
On October 23, 2015, Sony Masterworks released the debut album of Band of Merrymakers, titled "Welcome to Our Christmas Party." The album includes guest appearances from various artists, such as Christina Perri, Mark McGrath, and Natasha Bedingfield.

=== Promotion ===
Band of Merrymakers has made several appearances on TV shows such as Jimmy Kimmel Live, The TODAY Show, and Extra to promote their albums.

=== Charts ===
"Welcome to Our Christmas Party" peaked at number 9 on the iTunes Holiday Charts.

=== Reviews ===
- According to Entertainment Weekly, the album is catchy and anthemic and captures the childlike joy of the holiday season.
- PopSugar describes the album's lead single, "Snow Snow Snow," as irresistibly catchy and fun, perfect to get listeners into the holiday spirit.
- Perez Hilton praises the debut album of Band of Merrymakers as one of their favorites of the holiday season and highlights the lead single "Snow Snow Snow".

== Charity ==
A portion of the proceeds went to the MusiCares Foundation.
