= Welcome to Our Christmas Party =

Studio album by Band of Merrymakers
- Released: October 23, 2015
- Recorded: 2015
- Genre: Christmas
- Length: 34:36
- Label: Sony Masterworks

Welcome to Our Christmas Party is the debut full-length studio album of Christmas music by Band of Merrymakers, released on October 23, 2015, through Sony Masterworks. The album features seven original songs written by members of the group and renditions of four traditional Christmas songs.

== Track listing ==
Sources: Amazon.com and AllMusic

No.	Title	Writer(s)	Performer(s)	Length
1.	"Snow Snow Snow"	Kevin Griffin, Sam Hollander	Natasha Bedingfield, Owl City, Michael Fitzpatrick, Mark McGrath	3:35
2.	"Holiday in L.A."	Griffin, Hollander, Charity Daw, Josh Edmondson, Fitzpatrick	Bedingfield, Fitzpatrick, McGrath, Andrew McMahon	3:05
3.	"Wishlist"	Griffin, Hollander, Bedingfield	Bedingfield	2:57
4.	"Jingle Bells"	James Lord Pierpont	Alex & Sierra, Bebe Rexha	2:57
5.	"Christmastime"	Griffin, Hollander, Christina Perri, David Hodges	Hodges, Perri	3:23
6.	"Joy to the World"	Isaac Watts, Hoyt Axton	Firekid	2:49
7.	"Gather Round"	Griffin, Hollander, Bedingfield	Bedingfield, Jason Wade	3:35
8.	"O Holy Night"	Adolphe Adam	Alex & Sierra, David Ryan Harris, Street Corner Symphony	3:31
9.	"And to All a Good Night"	Griffin, Hollander	Dan Wilson	2:58
10.	"Must Be Christmas"	Griffin, Hollander	Fitzpatrick, Tyler Glenn, Griffin, Nick Hexum, Charles Kelley, The Mowgli's, Sinclair, Smallpools, The Grand Southern	3:42
11.	"Auld Lang Syne"	Traditional, Robert Burns	Band of Merrymakers	2:04
Total length:				34:36

== Personnel ==
Credits adapted from AllMusic

Featured artists

- Alex & Sierra — vocals
- Natasha Bedingfield — vocals
- Firekid – vocals
- Michael Fitzpatrick — vocals
- Tyler Glenn — vocals
- Kevin Griffin — guitar, bass guitar, keyboards, vocals
- David Ryan Harris — vocals
- Nick Hexum — vocals
- David Hodges — vocals
- Charles Kelley — vocals
- Mark McGrath — vocals
- Andrew McMahon — vocals
- The Mowgli's — vocals
- Owl City — vocals
- Christina Perri — vocals
- Bebe Rexha — vocals
- Sinclair – vocals
- Smallpools — vocals
- The Grand Southern – vocals
- Street Corner Symphony — vocals
- Jason Wade — vocals
- Dan Wilson — vocals

Other musicians

- Courtlan Clement — banjo, acoustic guitar
- Charity Daw – vocals
- Josh Edmondson – drums, guitar, bass guitar, keyboards, vocals
- Jen Hollander – vocals
- Joey Hollander – vocals
- Sam Hollander — drums, vocals
- Dash Hutton – drums
- Grant Michaels – keyboards
- Jamie Moore – guitar, bass guitar, keyboards
- Billy Nobel – keyboards
- Thomas Onebane – guitar, keyboards
- Ben Phillips – drums
- Matthew Puckett — vocals (background)
- Duran Visek – vocals

Technical

- Keith Armstrong — mixing
- Brad Blackwood — mastering
- Reinhardt Creative – creative director
- C. Taylor Crothers – photography
- Josh Edmondson — engineer, production, programming
- Kevin Griffin – engineer, production, programming
- Sam Hollander – production, programming
- Tommy King – engineer, production
- Jennifer Liebeskind – production development
- Grant Michaels – programming
- Jamie Moore – mixing, production, programming
- Winnie Murguia – engineer
- Caitlin Notey – mixing assistant
- Thomas Onebane – production, programming
- Ben Phillips – engineer, mixing
- Will Pugh — vocal engineer
- Megan Reinhardt – creative director
- Pierre-Andre Rigoll – engineer
- David Simoné — executive producer
- Winston Simone – executive producer

== Release history ==
Region	Date	Format(s)	Label
United States	October 23, 2015	CD; digital download	Sony Masterworks
