= Nik Wallenda: Beyond Niagara =

- Genre: Documentary; Reality television
- Starring: Nik Wallenda; Terry Troffer; Erinenda Wallenda
- Country of origin: United States
- Original language: English
- No. of seasons: 1
- No. of episodes: 6

Production
- Running time: 60 minutes
- Production companies: Relativity Media; The Jay and Tony Show

Original release
- Network: Science Channel
- Release: June 18 – July 2, 2012

Nik Wallenda: Beyond Niagara (earlier titled Danger by Design) is an American documentary/reality television program that aired on the Science Channel. The hour-long show followed daredevil and highwire artist Nik Wallenda and his family as they traveled the country performing dangerous feats. It focused on the science and engineering that go into Wallenda's acts, as he pushes "the limits of science further than ever before." According to Science Channel's general manager Debbie Adler Myers, the program gave "viewers some insight into the passion, skills, ingenuity and science behind the thrills, that has driven the Wallendas to world-renowned fame."

Beyond Niagara officially premiered on June 18, 2012 under the title Danger By Design. However, the show's pilot episode had previously aired in 2010 under the title Life on a Wire, before Discovery decided to hold the show until after Nik Wallenda's highly publicized wire walk over Niagara Falls on June 15, 2012. After the first two episodes aired, Discovery renamed the show Nik Wallenda: Beyond Niagara. The next week, on July 2, it was put "on hold" and pulled from the schedule. On the decision to cancel the show, Wallenda commented: "There was really no marketing done on it, and it went through three name changes, so it's really not that surprising." He did, however, say the show had gained some traction overseas, so there was a possibility it could have a second life abroad. The Science Channel declined to comment on their decision. On July 8, the show premiered in India under the Danger by Design title. On July 11, it premiered in Malaysia, also under the Danger title.

== Episodes ==
Episode 1
Bahamas (June 18, 2012)

The pilot episode tracked Nik Wallenda's high-wire walk and bicycle ride at Atlantis Paradise Island in the Bahamas. After a planning session with his father Terry Troffer, uncle Mike Troffer, and a long-time friend of Wallenda's, the episode shows Wallenda training for high winds in the backyard using an overturned airboat. It then shows the technical setup that went into Wallenda's feats in the Bahamas, followed by Wallend's record setting bicycle ride.

Between the bike ride and Wallenda scheduled tightrope walk, Terry Troffer, who serves as safety coordinator, passes out from heat and stress. When he is taken to the hospital, Wallenda struggles but decides "the show must go on." Wallenda completes a career best 2000 foot highwire walk with his mother Delilah filling in for Troffer.

Episode 2
Sway Poles & Motorcycle Ride (June 18, 2012)

The second episode of Nik Wallenda: Beyond Niagara focuses on the communication between Nik Wallenda and his wife Erinenda as the do a pair of stunts. The first is a sway pole act in their home town of Sarasota, Florida. The program shows how Erinenda makes the outfits for the performance, before showing the act from several angles.

Later the couple visits Santa Cruz, California where Nik rides a motorcycle across a highwire, using Erinenda as a counter weight to help him spin it around the wire three times. The program focuses on explaining the physics that allow the feat to take place, and the engineering that went into making it possible.

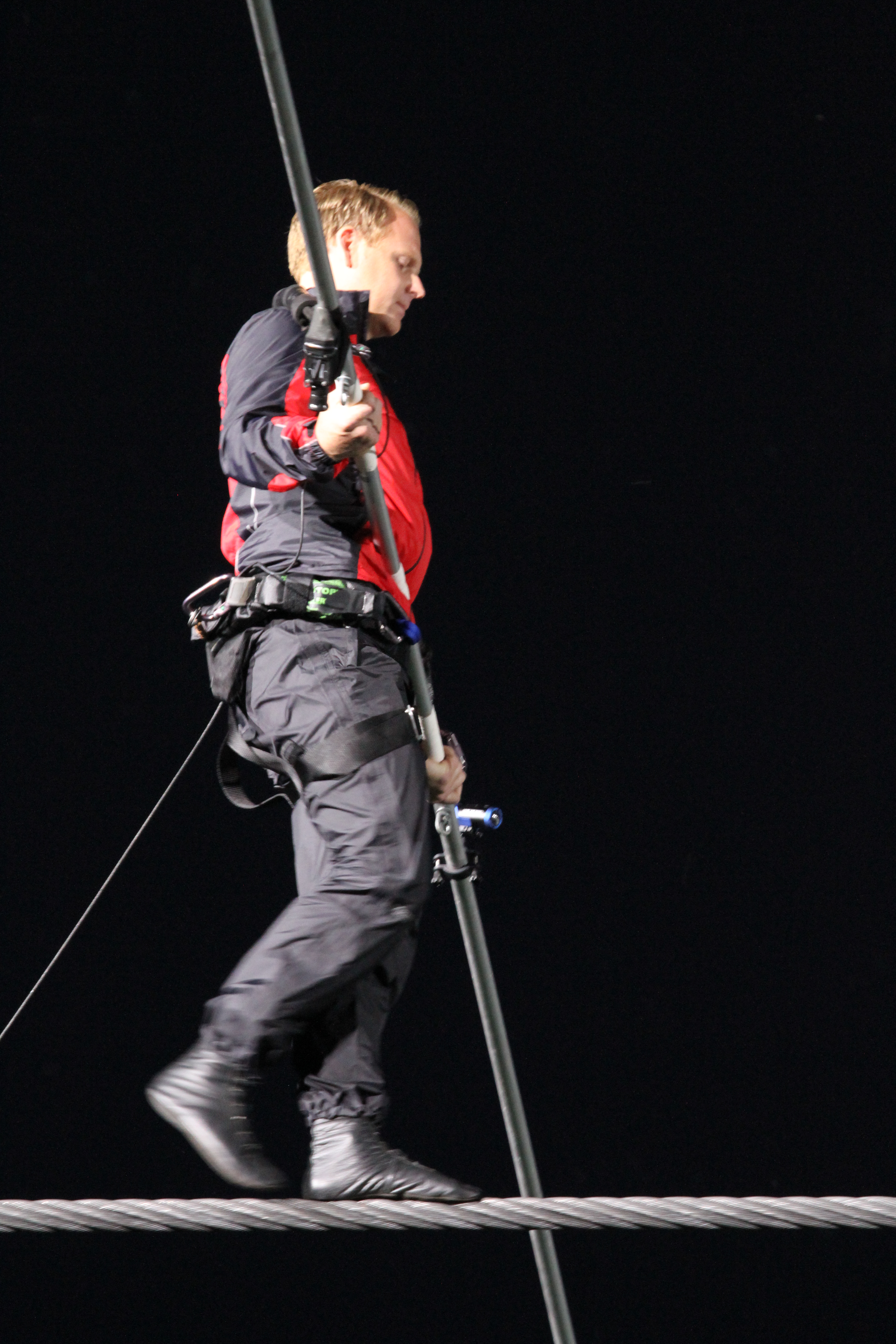
Beyond Niagara stars Nik Wallenda, pictured here crossing Niagara Falls in June 2012

Episode 3
Wheel of Death (June 25, 2012)

In the third episode, Nik Wallenda performs at the Tropicana Casino and Resort in Atlantic City, New Jersey. The events in the episode occurred in April 2011. First, he performs a rare indoor wirewalk. Then the program highlights the technological challenges as Wallenda attempts to perform the Wheel of Death from the resort's rooftop, a feat which has never before been attempted from that height and from the side of a building. The show ends with him setting a world record for highest performance of the act.

Episode 4
Exploding Box, Return to Puerto Rico (June 25, 2012)

The fourth episode of Beyond Niagara focuses on Nik and Delilah Wallenda's attempt to recreate the act that killed Karl Wallenda in 1978. The team must reverse engineer the stunt to determine what caused Karl's death. In a performance filled with emotion, the mother-son duo successfully complete the feat. Earlier in the episode, a box filled with dynamite was ignited with Nik inside.

Episode 5
Zip Line, Ferris Wheel Walk (July 2, 2012)

The fifth episode tracks Nik Wallenda as he attempts his first-ever fire related act. The stunt calls for him to slide down a zip-line into a shallow pool of water as the park burns around him. Later in the episode, Wallenda returns to Santa Cruz to walk along the top of a Ferris wheel as it runs.

Episode 6
Helicopter Hang (July 2, 2012)

In the season finale of Beyond Niagara, the Wallendas travel in Branson, Missouri where they perform a three-person pyramid on the highwire. The act features Nik Wallenda and Jonah Finkelstein riding on bicycles as Delilah Wallenda sits on a chair perched atop a balancing bar they carry. Later in the episode, Nik performs on a trapeze suspended from a moving helicopter. For the finale, he hangs from the bar using nothing but his jaw.

== Reception ==
The Sarasota Herald-Tribune described the pilot episode of Danger By Design as "a sometimes painfully candid look at the creative tensions — and the strong familial bond — between Wallenda and his dad, Terry Troffer." The Advocate classified the program as "worth a look." Patch.com writer Charles Schelle said the show lets viewers see "that underneath Nik's cool, collected personality that we see from afar on the wire, he is a serious businessman and has no room for mistakes from other people or himself."

Melissa Camacho, writing for Common Sense Media, gave the show 3 stars (out of 5) saying it is "definitely entertaining". She adds, "The simple [physics] explanations offered here, as well as the discoveries [the Wallendas] make during testing phases, are very informative. However, the real highlight of the series is watching and listening to the Wallendas perform their acts. The Star commented "what's interesting is that the documentary also sheds light on the vulnerable moments faced by the family."

== Credits ==
Nik Wallenda: Beyond Niagara was produced by Relativity Media and The Jay and Tony Show. Executive producers were Jay Blumenfield, Tony Marsh, Tom Forman, Winston Simone, David Simone, and Josh Berkley. Directors were Tony Sacco and John Downer.
