= 4troops =

4Troops
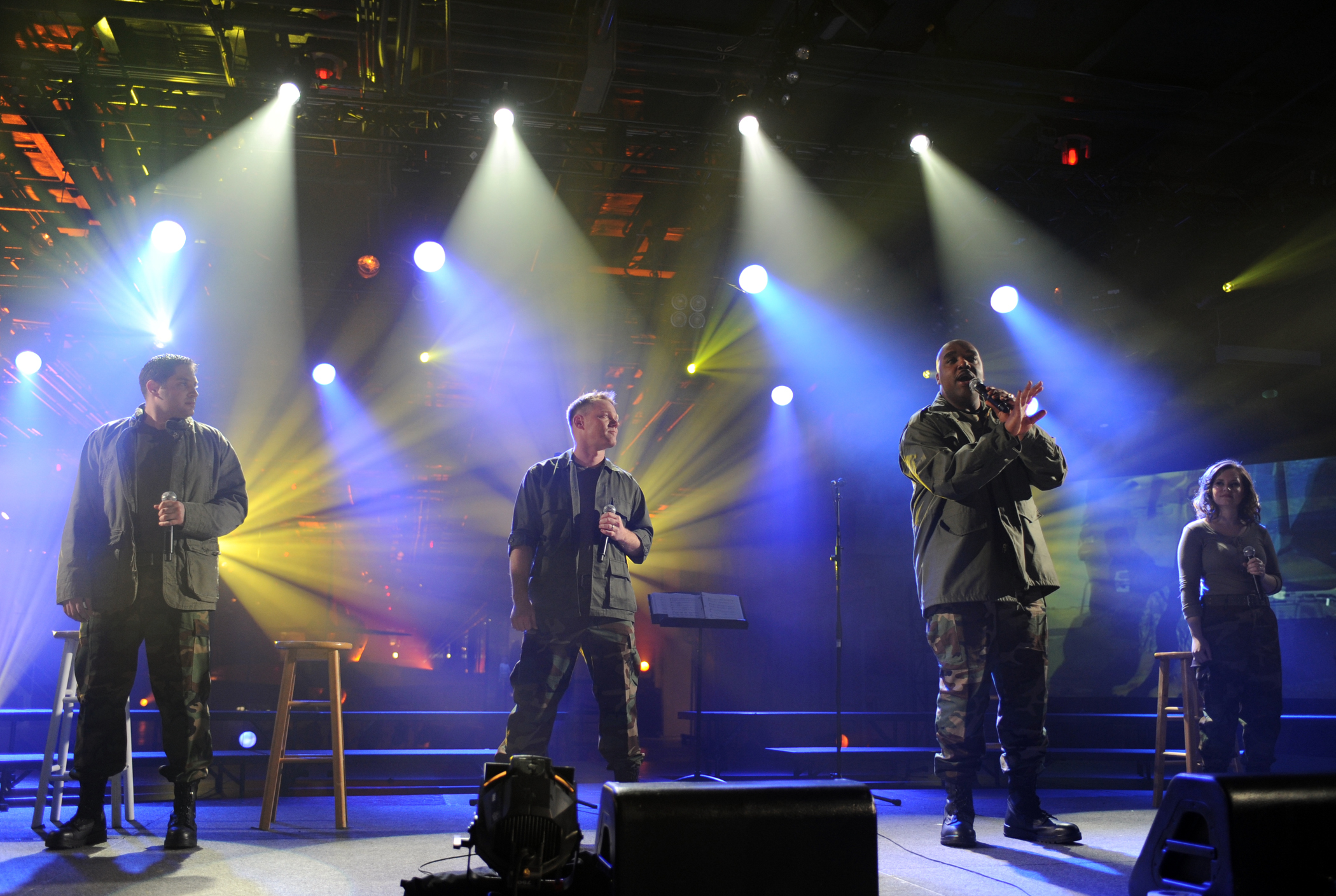
- 4TROOPS performing aboard the USS Intrepid in New York City during a taping of a PBS television special in 2010

Background information
- Genres: Vocal music
- Years active: 2009
- Members: Daniel Jens; Meredith Melcher; Ron Henry; David Clemo
- Website: 4troopsmusic.com

4Troops is a pop vocal music ensemble consisting of four retired United States armed forces personnel: former Sgt. Daniel Jens, former Cpt. Meredith Melcher, former Staff Sgt. Ron Henry and former Sgt. David Clemo. All four saw active combat duty in Iraq.

4Troops focus on patriotic songs, often with special relationship to their life and service in the military. Their nationalist appeal and country and western related music themes led to appearances on PBS "Live from the Intrepid", CNN's Larry King Live (May 12, 2010), ABC News with Bob Woodruff, Comedy Central's Rally to Restore Sanity and/or Fear, and Game 4 of the 2010 World Series.

The group's first CD, also titled 4Troops, stayed on the Billboard 200 charts for 6 weeks, peaking at 36th position.
