= Toni Braxton discography =

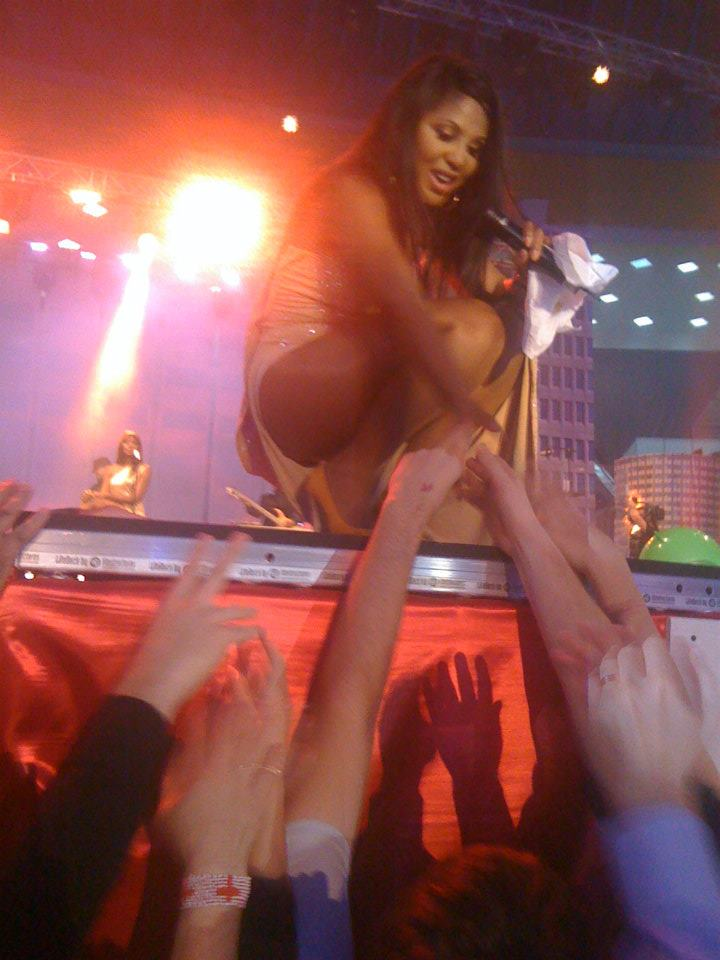
- Braxton performing in 2011
- Studio albums: 10
- Extended plays: 6
- Compilation albums: 10
- Singles: 36
- Video albums: 2
- Music videos: 25
- Box sets: 2

American singer Toni Braxton has released ten studio albums, six extended plays, ten compilation albums, two remix albums, thirty-six singles (including three featured singles), two video albums and twenty-five music videos in a career spanning over 30 years. She was born in Severn, Maryland, on October 7, 1967. Her mother, an opera vocalist, encouraged Braxton and her four sisters to sing in church at a young age. In 1990, songwriter Bill Pettaway discovered the sisters and helped them obtain a record deal with Arista Records, as the group titled The Braxtons; the group's debut single, "Good Life", was released the same year. Although the song performed poorly, Braxton's voice caught the attention of producers, L.A. Reid and Babyface, who signed her to their newly formed LaFace Records. In 1991, Braxton recorded songs for the soundtrack to the 1992 film Boomerang. Her solo debut single, "Love Shoulda Brought You Home", reached the top forty of the US Billboard Hot 100 chart and the top five of the Hot R&B/Hip-Hop Songs chart. Two years later, her self-titled debut album was issued through LaFace. The album topped the US Billboard 200 and R&B/Hip-Hop Albums charts and was certified eight-times platinum by the Recording Industry Association of America (RIAA). It spawned four singles, including "Breathe Again", which peaked within the top ten in the United States, Australia, Canada, Ireland, the Netherlands and the United Kingdom. The album has sold over ten million copies worldwide.

Braxton's second studio album, Secrets, was released in 1996. Featuring songwriting and production by Reid, Babyface, Diane Warren, R. Kelly and David Foster, the album peaked at number two on the Billboard 200 chart and was certified eight-times platinum by the RIAA. It also made the top ten in many other countries including Canada, Germany, the Netherlands, Switzerland and the United Kingdom. The album features four singles, including two double A-sides. The first single, "You're Makin' Me High", became Braxton's first number one single in the United States, where it topped the Hot 100 and R&B charts. "Un-Break My Heart", the album's second single, topped the charts in the United States, Sweden, and Switzerland and peaked within the top five in Canada, Germany, Ireland, the Netherlands and the United Kingdom; it became the second biggest-selling single by a female artist in the United States. Secrets has sold about fifteen million copies worldwide. The following year, Braxton filed a lawsuit against LaFace, which asked for a release from her record contract. However, LaFace countersued, a move which prompted Braxton to file for bankruptcy. She spent the next year in a state of oblivion, but reached an agreement with LaFace the year after. Her third studio album, The Heat, was released in April 2000. The album debuted at number two on the Billboard 200 chart and topped the R&B/Hip-Hop Albums chart. It also reached number one in Canada and charted within the top ten in France, Germany, the Netherlands, Switzerland and the United Kingdom. The lead single, "He Wasn't Man Enough", became another top-five Hot 100 entry in the United States for Braxton and the second single, "Just Be a Man About It", became a top-10 R&B entry. The Heat was certified double platinum by the RIAA and has sold four million copies worldwide. Braxton released her first Christmas album, Snowflakes, the next year. Her fifth studio album More Than a Woman was released in 2002. In the United States, the album charted within the top 20 and also received a gold certification.

In April 2003, Braxton parted ways with LaFace and Arista and signed a record deal with Blackground Records. Libra, the first album release through them, debuted at number four on the Billboard 200 chart and was certified gold by the RIAA. Braxton spent the next three years as the main performer at the Flamingo Hotel & Casino, Las Vegas and later participated on the television series Dancing with the Stars. In October 2008, she signed a record deal with Atlantic Records. Pulse, her seventh studio album, was released in May 2010. The album became another R&B chart-topper for Braxton and cracked the top ten of the Billboard 200 chart. The lead single from the album, "Yesterday", peaked at number twelve on the R&B/Hip-Hop Songs chart. In a career now spanning over two decades, Braxton has accumulated sales of 70 million records worldwide.

== Albums ==
=== Studio albums ===
List of studio albums, with selected chart positions, sales figures and certifications
Title	Details	Peak chart positions										Sales	Certifications
Title	Details	US	AUS	CAN	FRA	GER	JPN	NLD	SWE	SWI	UK	Sales	Certifications
Toni Braxton	Released: July 13, 1993; Label: LaFace, Arista (74321-16268-2); Formats: CD, cassette, LP	1	6	4	—	7	79	11	24	—	4	WW: 10,000,000; US: 6,107,000 (Note: As of April 2011, Toni Braxton had sold 5,135,000 copies in the United States according to Nielsen SoundScan, with an additional 972,000 copies sold at BMG Music Club. Nielsen SoundScan does not count albums sold through clubs like the BMG Music Service, which were significantly popular in the 1990s.)	RIAA: 8× Platinum; ARIA: Gold; BPI: Gold; MC: 2× Platinum; NVPI: Gold; RIAJ: Gold
Secrets	Released: June 18, 1996; Label: LaFace, Arista (73008-26020-2); Formats: CD, cassette, LP	2	11	4	22	2	65	1	2	1	10	WW: 15,000,000; US: 6,291,000 (Note: As of April 2011, Secrets had sold 5,364,000 copies in the United States according to Nielsen SoundScan, with an additional 927,000 sold at BMG Music Club. Nielsen SoundScan does not count albums sold through clubs like the BMG Music Service, which were significantly popular in the 1990s.)	RIAA: 8× Platinum; ARIA: 2× Platinum; BPI: 2× Platinum; BVMI: Platinum; IFPI SWE: Platinum; IFPI SWI: 2× Platinum; MC: 7× Platinum; NVPI: 2× Platinum; RIAJ: Platinum; SNEP: Gold
The Heat	Released: April 25, 2000; Label: LaFace (73008-26069-2); Formats: CD, cassette, LP	2	14	1	9	3	25	3	6	2	3	WW: 4,000,000; UK: 175,000; US: 2,093,000	RIAA: 2× Platinum; ARIA: Gold; BPI: Gold; BVMI: Gold; IFPI SWI: Gold; NVPI: Gold; RIAJ: Gold; SNEP: Gold
Snowflakes	Released: October 23, 2001; Label: Arista (07822-14723-2); Formats: CD, cassette	119	—	—	—	92	—	—	—	—	—	US: 243,000	RIAA: Gold
More Than a Woman	Released: November 19, 2002; Label: Arista (07822-14749-2); Formats: CD, LP	13	—	66	90	37	114	88	—	23	123	US: 438,000	RIAA: Gold
Libra	Released: September 27, 2005; Label: Blackground (B0005441-02); Formats: CD, digital download	4	—	—	—	60	—	—	—	25	—	US: 441,000; UK: 4,417	RIAA: Gold
Pulse	Released: May 4, 2010; Label: Atlantic (520269-2); Formats: CD, CD/DVD, digital download	9	—	73	—	18	115	83	—	9	28	US: 156,000	
Love, Marriage & Divorce (with Babyface)	Released: February 4, 2014; Label: Motown; Formats: CD, digital download	4	—	—	—	—	73	45	—	—	75	US: 211,000	
Sex & Cigarettes	Released: March 23, 2018; Label: Def Jam; Formats: CD, digital download	22	—	—	—	—	—	170	—	—	33	US: 388,000	RIAA: Gold
Spell My Name	Released: August 28, 2020; Label: Island; Formats: CD, digital download, LP	163	—	—	—	—	—	—	—	—	— (Note: Spell My Name did not enter the UK Albums Chart, but peaked at number 21 on the UK Album Downloads Chart.)		
"—" denotes a recording that did not chart or was not released in that territory.

=== Compilation albums ===
List of compilation albums, with selected chart positions and certifications
Title	Details	Peak chart positions						Certifications
Title	Details	US	US R&B	BRA	JPN	SWI	UK	Certifications
Ultimate Toni Braxton	Released: November 4, 2003; Label: Arista, Sony BMG (82876 56783 2); Formats: CD, digital download	119	43	—	172	86	23	BPI: Gold
Artist Collection: Toni Braxton	Released: October 12, 2004; Label: Sony BMG (82876 63640-2); Format: CD	—	—	—	—	—	—	
Platinum & Gold	Released: October 12, 2004; Label: LaFace (SBMK 788312); Formats: CD, digital download	—	78	—	—	—	—	
Un-Break My Heart: The Remix Collection	Released: April 12, 2005; Label: LaFace (PID 897644); Formats: CD, digital download	—	—	—	—	—	—	
Breathe Again: Toni Braxton at Her Best	Released: April 26, 2005; Label: Sony BMG (JKCD 1457); Format: CD	—	96	—	—	—	—	
The Essential Toni Braxton	Released: February 20, 2007; Label: LaFace (88697 05536 2); Format: CD	—	48	—	—	—	—	
The Best So Far	Released: April 2007; Label: Som Livre (0709-2); Format: CD	—	—	2	—	—	—	PMB: Platinum
Playlist: The Very Best of Toni Braxton	Released: October 28, 2008; Label: Sony Music (PLLT 727451); Formats: CD, digital download	—	—	—	—	—	—	
Breathe Again: The Best of Toni Braxton	Released: June 5, 2009; Label: Sony Music (PLLT 727451); Formats: CD, digital download	—	—	—	—	—	—	
Essential Mixes	Released: September 20, 2010; Label: Sony Music (88697-76788-2); Formats: CD, LP	—	—	—	—	—	—	
"—" denotes a recording that did not chart or was not released in that territory.

=== Box sets ===
Title	Details	Notes
The Collection	Released: June 13, 2006; Label: LaFace, Legacy; Format: CD	Three-disc compilation containing Secrets, The Heat and More Than a Woman.; Contains separate CD case for each album.
Secrets/More Than a Woman	Released: October 4, 2011; Label: Sony Music; Format: CD	Two-disc compilation containing Secrets and More Than a Woman.

== Extended plays ==
Title	Details
Discover Toni Braxton	Released: November 30, 2007; Label: LaFace, Legacy; Format: Digital download
Discover More	Released: November 9, 2010; Label: LaFace, Legacy; Format: Digital download
Discover Beyond	Released: November 9, 2010; Label: LaFace, Legacy; Format: Digital download
Soul Pack: Toni Braxton	Released: June 7, 2011; Label: 360 Music, X5 Music Group; Format: Digital download
Coping (Remixes)	Released: November 10, 2017; Label: Def Jam; Format: Digital download
Home All Alone	Released: August 14, 2020; Label: Island; Format: Digital download

== Singles ==
=== 1990s ===
List of singles released in the 1990s decade, with selected chart positions and certifications, showing year released and album name
Title	Year	Peak chart positions										Certifications	Album
Title	Year	US	US R&B /HH	AUS	CAN	GER	IRE	NLD	SWE	SWI	UK	Certifications	Album
"Love Shoulda Brought You Home"	1992	33	4	—	—	—	—	—	—	—	33		Boomerang: Original Soundtrack Album and Toni Braxton
"Another Sad Love Song"	1993	7	2	57	16	60	—	43	—	—	15	RIAA: Gold	Toni Braxton
"Breathe Again"	1993	3	4	2	7	52	10	7	25	—	2	RIAA: Gold; ARIA: Platinum; BPI: Silver	Toni Braxton
"Seven Whole Days"	1993	—	— (Note: "Seven Whole Days" did not enter the Hot R&B/Hip-Hop Songs chart, but peaked at number one on the Hot R&B/Hip-Hop Airplay chart.)	—	—	—	—	—	—	—	—		Toni Braxton
"You Mean the World to Me"	1994	7	3	49	6	69	—	—	—	—	30	RIAA: Gold	Toni Braxton
"I Belong to You" (Note: Released as a double A-side in certain countries.)	1994	28	6	—	80	—	—	—	—	—	—		Toni Braxton
"How Many Ways"	1994	28	6	—	—	—	—	—	—	—	—		Toni Braxton
"You're Makin' Me High"	1996	1	1	2	8	47	21	18	11	—	7	RIAA: Platinum; ARIA: Platinum; BPI: Gold	Secrets
"Let It Flow"	1996	1	1	—	—	—	—	—	—	—	—		Waiting to Exhale: Original Soundtrack Album and Secrets
"Un-Break My Heart"	1996	1	2	6	2	2	2	2	1	1	2	RIAA: Platinum; ARIA: Platinum; BPI: 2× Platinum; BVMI: Platinum; IFPI SWE: Gold; IFPI SWI: Gold	Secrets
"I Don't Want To"	1997	19	9	71	13	37	10	41	15	—	9	RIAA: Gold	Secrets
"I Love Me Some Him"	1997	19	9	—	—	—	—	—	—	—	—		Secrets
"How Could an Angel Break My Heart" (with Kenny G)	1997	—	—	—	—	—	16	34	—	—	22		Secrets
"—" denotes a recording that did not chart or was not released in that territory.

=== 2000s ===
List of singles released in the 2000s decade, with selected chart positions and certifications, showing year released and album name
Title	Year	Peak chart positions										Certifications	Album
Title	Year	US	US R&B /HH	AUS	CAN	GER	IRE	NLD	SWE	SWI	UK	Certifications	Album
"He Wasn't Man Enough"	2000	2	1	5	1	20	12	5	10	7	5	RIAA: Gold; ARIA: Gold; BPI: Platinum	The Heat
"Just Be a Man About It"	2000	32	6	—	34	—	—	—	—	—	—		The Heat
"Spanish Guitar"	2000	98	75	44	22	45	—	19	49	36	—		The Heat
"Maybe"	2001	—	74	—	—	—	—	—	—	—	—		The Heat
"Snowflakes of Love"	2001	— (Note: "Snowflakes of Love" did not enter the Billboard Hot 100, but peaked at number 25 on the Adult Contemporary chart.)	—	—	—	—	—	—	—	—	—		Snowflakes
"Christmas in Jamaica" (featuring Shaggy)	2001	—	— (Note: "Christmas in Jamaica" did not enter the Hot R&B/Hip-Hop Songs chart, but peaked at number three on the Bubbling Under R&B/Hip-Hop Singles chart.)	—	—	—	—	—	—	—	—		Snowflakes
"Hit the Freeway" (featuring Loon)	2002	86	32	46	—	56	—	—	40	38	29		More Than a Woman
"Please"	2005	— (Note: "Please" did not enter the Billboard Hot 100, but peaked at number three on the Bubbling Under Hot 100 Singles chart.)	36	—	—	—	—	—	—	—	—		Libra
"Trippin' (That's the Way Love Works)"	2005	—	67	—	—	—	—	—	—	—	—		Libra
"Take This Ring"	2005	—	— (Note: "Take This Ring" did not enter the Hot R&B/Hip-Hop Songs chart, but peaked at number 12 on the Bubbling Under R&B/Hip-Hop Singles chart.)	—	—	—	—	—	—	—	—		Libra
"Suddenly"	2006	—	—	—	—	—	—	—	—	—	—		Libra
"The Time of Our Lives" (with Il Divo)	2006	—	—	—	—	17	—	—	—	8	—		Voices from the FIFA World Cup
"Yesterday"	2009	— (Note: "Yesterday" did not enter the Billboard Hot 100, but peaked at number 16 on the Bubbling Under Hot 100 Singles chart.)	12	—	—	20	—	—	—	17	50		Pulse
"—" denotes a recording that did not chart or was not released in that territory.

=== 2010s–2020s ===
List of singles released in the 2010s and 2020s decades, with selected chart positions, showing year released and album name
Title	Year	Peak chart positions					Album
Title	Year	US Bub.	US R&B /HH	US R&B	US R&B /HH Airplay	US Adult R&B	Album
"Hands Tied"	2010	—	29	—	29	6	Pulse
"Make My Heart"	2010	—	— (Note: "Make My Heart" did not enter the Hot R&B/Hip-Hop Songs chart, but peaked at number 10 on the Bubbling Under R&B/Hip-Hop Singles chart.)	—	—	—	Pulse
"I Heart You"	2012	— (Note: "I Heart You" did not enter the Billboard Bubbling Under Hot 100, but peaked at number one on the Dance Club Songs chart.)	—	—	—	—	Non-album single
"Hurt You" (with Babyface)	2013	13	33	15	16	1	Love, Marriage & Divorce
"Where Did We Go Wrong" (with Babyface)	2013	—	—	—	39	11	Love, Marriage & Divorce
"Deadwood"	2017	—	—	—	34	7	Sex & Cigarettes
"Long as I Live"	2018	—	56	15	15	1	Sex & Cigarettes
"Do It" (solo or remix featuring Missy Elliott)	2020	—	—	13	11	1	Spell My Name
"Dance"	2020	—	—	—	—	17	Spell My Name
"Gotta Move On" (featuring H.E.R.)	2020	—	—	17	12	1	Spell My Name
"—" denotes a recording that did not chart or was not released in that territory.

=== As featured artist ===
List of singles as featured artist, with selected chart positions, showing year released and album name
Title	Year	Peak chart positions								Album
Title	Year	US	US R&B /HH	US R&B	US R&B /HH Airplay	AUS	CAN	SWE	UK	Album
"Give U My Heart" (Babyface featuring Toni Braxton)	1992	29	2	—	—	110	—	—	—	Boomerang: Original Soundtrack Album
"Baby You Can Do It" (with Birdman)	2003	—	73	—	—	—	—	—	—	Birdman
"We Are the World 25 for Haiti" (as part of Artists for Haiti)	2010	2	—	—	—	18	7	5	50	Non-album single
"Live Out Your Love" (Kem featuring Toni Braxton)	2020	—	—	23	14	—	—	—	—	Love Always Wins
"—" denotes a recording that did not chart or was not released in that territory.

== Guest appearances ==
List of non-single guest appearances, with other performing artists, showing year released and album name
Title	Year	Other artist(s)	Album
"Reversal of a Dog"	1992	The LaFace Cartel, Damian Dame, Highland Place Mobsters, TLC	Boomerang: Original Soundtrack Album
"The Christmas Song"	1993	None	A LaFace Family Christmas
"Brown Baby"	1996	None	For Our Children Too!
"That Somebody Was You"	1996	Kenny G	The Moment
"Stop, Look, Listen (To Your Heart)"	2004	Michael McDonald	Motown Two
"It's the Most Wonderful Time of the Year"	2005	None	40 Years: A Charlie Brown Christmas
"Suddenly"	2008	Richard Marx	Sundown
"If You Dream"	2009	Tank, Tyrese, Jordin Sparks, Omarion, Faith Evans, JoJo, Charlie Wilson, Tamar Braxton, Steve Russell	More than a Game
"Happily Unhappy"	2021	Jam & Lewis	Jam & Lewis: Volume One

== Videography ==
=== Video albums ===
Title	Details	Notes
Toni Braxton: The Hit Video Collection	Released: May 24, 1994; Label: LaFace; Formats: VHS, DVD	A 35-minute-long video longform containing music videos for "Breathe Again", "Another Sad Love Song", "Seven Whole Days", "Love Shoulda Brought You Home", and "You Mean the World to Me".; Peaked at number eight on the US Billboard Top Music Videos chart and number forty on the Billboard Top Video Sales chart.; The compilation was certified Gold by the Recording Industry Association of America in July 1994.
From Toni with Love... The Video Collection	Released: November 20, 2001; Label: Arista; Format: DVD	A DVD compilation containing Braxton's fourteen music videos including "Breathe Again", "Another Sad Love Song", and "You're Makin' Me High".; Separate commentary track, by Braxton, on each music video also included.; Peaked at number twenty-nine on the US Billboard Top Music Videos chart.

=== Music videos ===
List of music videos, showing year released and director
Title	Year	Director(s)	Ref.
As lead artist
"Love Shoulda Brought You Home"	1992	Ralph Ziman	
"Another Sad Love Song"	1993	Ralph Ziman	
"Breathe Again" / "Respira Otra Vez"	1993	Randee St. Nicholas	
"Seven Whole Days"	1993	Lionel C. Martin	
"You Mean the World to Me"	1994	Lionel C. Martin	
"How Many Ways"	1994	Lionel C. Martin	
"Let It Flow"	1995	Herb Ritts	
"You're Makin Me High"	1996	Bille Woodruff	
"Un-Break My Heart" / "Regresa a Mi"	1996	Bille Woodruff	
"I Don't Want To"	1997	Bille Woodruff	
"How Could an Angel Break My Heart"	1997	Iain Softley	
"He Wasn't Man Enough"	2000	Bille Woodruff	
"Just Be a Man About It"	2000	Bille Woodruff	
"Spanish Guitar"	2000	Bille Woodruff	
"Hit the Freeway"	2000	Dave Meyers and Charles Infante	
"Please"	2005	Chris Robinson	
"Yesterday"	2009	Bille Woodruff	
"Make My Heart"	2010	Bille Woodruff	
"Hands Tied"	2010	Bille Woodruff	
"Woman"	2010	Unknown	
"I Heart You"	2012	Bille Woodruff	
"Deadwood"	2017	Bille Woodruff	
"Long as I Live"	2018	Mike Ho	
"Dance"	2020	Mike Ho	
"Gotta Move On" (featuring H.E.R.)	2020	Mike Ho	
As featured artist
"Give U My Heart" (with Babyface)	1992	Unknown	
"Baby You Can Do It" (Birdman featuring Toni Braxton)	2002	David Palmer	
"The Time of Our Lives" (with Il Divo)	2006	Nigel Dick	
"We Are the World 25 for Haiti" (as part of Artists for Haiti)	2010	Paul Haggis	
"Hurt You" (with Babyface)	2013	Ray Kay	

==== Guest appearances ====
List of guest appearances in music videos, showing year released, artist, and directors
Title	Year	Artist	Director	Ref.
"Miss You"	2002	Aaliyah	Darren Grant	

== See also ==
- List of songs recorded by Toni Braxton
