= The Essential Toni Braxton =

The Essential: Toni Braxton

Greatest hits album by Toni Braxton
- Released: February 20, 2007 (U.S.)
- Recorded: 1990–2005
- Genre: R&B
- Label: LaFace Records; Som Livre (Brazil)
- Producer: Babyface; Teddy Bishop; David Foster; Mannie Fresh; Royal Garden; Irv Gotti; Vincent Herbert; Rodney "Darkchild" Jerkins; R. Kelly; Klarmann/Weber; Frankie Knuckles; Keri Lewis; Steve Mac; The Neptunes; L.A. Reid; Jazze Pha; Tony Rich; Chink Santana; Daryl Simmons; Soulshock & Karlin; Junior Vasquez; Bryce Wilson

Toni Braxton chronology
Libra (2005)	The Essential: Toni Braxton (2007)	The Best So Far (2007)

The Essential Toni Braxton is a compilation album by the American recording artist Toni Braxton in Sony BMG's The Essential series. Released on February 20, 2007, it follows the earlier compilations Ultimate Toni Braxton, released in 2003, and Braxton's Platinum & Gold Collection, released in 2004. The Essential is a 2 disc album with thirty-six of Braxton's best songs. It also includes a song done with her sister group The Braxtons, "The Good Life".

== Background ==
"The Essential Toni Braxton" became Braxton's second compilation, following 2003's "Ultimate Toni Braxton". The compilation contains 2 discs, with the first containing the majority of her hits, and the second containing non-singles from her previous albums, as well as remixes, collaborations and unreleased tracks. It was released on February 20, 2007, in the United States.

=== Content ===
In addition to her previous hits, including "Another Sad Love Song", "Breathe Again", "Un-Break My Heart", "You're Makin' Me High", "He Wasn't Man Enough" and others, the first disc contains "Tell Me", from her 2002 album "More Than a Woman" and "Give U My Heart", a duet with Babyface to the soundtrack of the 1992 film Boomerang. The second disc contains some singles who performed very moderate on charts, such as "Hit the Freeway", many songs from her 1996 album "Secrets", the duet with Il Divo, "The Time of Our Lives", remixes from her remix compilation, "Un-Break My Heart: The Remix Collection", as well as her first single with her sisters, The Braxtons, called "Good Life".

== Critical reception ==
Professional ratings
Review scores
Source	Rating
Allmusic	4.5/5 stars
PopMatters	(5/10)

Andy Kellman of Allmusic gave to the compilation a rating of 4.5 out of 5 stars, writing that the album "amounts to an expanded update of 2003's Ultimate Toni Braxton, nearly doubling the content and digging deeper into the discography of one of the biggest R&B artists of the '90s. With the exception of favoring the R. Kelly remix of "How Many Ways" over the original, this set retains Ultimate's core 15 tracks while wisely choosing to use the studio version of "Seven Whole Days" instead of a live take. [...] Another pleasant surprise, tucked at the very end, is the inclusion of "Good Life," a 1990 single released by Toni and her four sisters as the Braxtons. If you want only the big hits, Ultimate will still do fine, but this set offers a more rounded and representative look back."

Mike Joseph of PopMatters gave the album 5 out of 10 stars, writing that, "It's hard to imagine why this album was even released. [...] and while it's a nice thing to have, it's by no means essential. This compilation contains just about every popular note Braxton ever offered, with a couple of mediocre dance mixes thrown in to add a bit of value to the project. [...] As a single disc containing all the necessary hits, it's the album you should probably bypass this bloated Essential set in favor of."

== Chart performance ==
"The Essential Toni Braxton" charted on the Top R&B/Hip-Hop Albums chart, peaking at number 48, remaining for two weeks on the chart.

== Track listings ==
=== The Essential Toni Braxton ===
Disc one
No.	Title	Writer(s)	Producer(s)	Length
1.	"Love Shoulda Brought You Home" (from Toni Braxton, 1993)	Kenneth "Babyface" Edmonds; Daryl Simmons; Bo Watson	Babyface; L.A. Reid; Daryl Simmons	4:56
2.	"I Love Me Some Him" (from Secrets, 1996)	Soulshock & Karlin; Andrea Martin; Gloria Stewart	SoulShock & Karlin	5:09
3.	"Tell Me" (from More Than a Woman, 2002)	Anita Baker; Anthony Bias; Toni Braxton; Louis Johnson; Keri Lewis	Keri Lewis	4:09
4.	"You're Makin' Me High" (from Secrets, 1996)	Babyface; Bryce Wilson	Babyface, Wilson	4:28
5.	"He Wasn't Man Enough" (from The Heat, 2000)	LaShawn Daniels; Fred Jerkins III; Rodney "Darkchild" Jerkins; Harvey Mason Jr.	Darkchild	4:22
6.	"Just Be a Man About It Feat. Dr. Dre" (from The Heat, 2000)	Johntá Austin; Teddy Bishop; Braxton; Bryan-Michael Cox	Bishop; Braxton; Cox	4:51
7.	"How Many Ways (R. Kelly remix)" (from Toni Braxton, 1993)	Braxton; Philip Field; Vincent Herbert	Herbert	5:47
8.	"Breathe Again" (from Toni Braxton, 1993)	Babyface	Babyface; Reid; Simmons	4:30
9.	"You Mean the World to Me" (from Toni Braxton, 1993)	Babyface; Reid; Simmons	Babyface; Reid; Simmons	4:57
10.	"I Belong to You" (from Toni Braxton, 1993)	Vassal Benford; Ronald Spearman	Benford	3:54
11.	"How Could an Angel Break My Heart" (from Secrets, 1996)	Babyface; Braxton	Babyface	4:21
12.	"Un-Break My Heart" (from Secrets, 1996)	Diane Warren	David Foster	4:31
13.	"Another Sad Love Song" (from Toni Braxton, 1993)	Babyface; Simmons	Babyface; Reid; Simmons	5:02
14.	"Seven Whole Days" (from Toni Braxton, 1993)	Babyface; Reid	Babyface; Reid; Simmons	6:20
15.	"I Don't Want To" (from Secrets, 1996)	R. Kelly	Kelly	4:17
16.	"Give U My Heart" (duet with Babyface) (from Boomerang: Original Soundtrack Album, 1992)	Babyface; Reid; Simmons; Watson	Babyface; Reid; Simmons	4:00

Disc two
No.	Title	Writer(s)	Producer(s)	Length
1.	"The Heat" (from The Heat, 2000)	Braxton; Keri Lewis	Braxton; Lewis	3:31
2.	"Gimme Some" (featuring Lisa "Left Eye" Lopes of TLC) (from The Heat, 2000)	Babyface; Braxton; Lisa Lopes; Jazze Pha	Babyface; Pha	4:04
3.	"There's No Me Without You" (from Secrets, 1996)	Babyface	Babyface	4:20
4.	"Why Should I Care" (from Secrets, 1996)	Babyface	Babyface	4:26
5.	"Spanish Guitar (Royal Garden Flamenco Remix)" (from Spanish Guitar, 2000)	Warren	Royal Garden	4:36
6.	"I'm Still Breathing" (from The Heat, 2000)	Warren	Foster	4:16
7.	"Me & My Boyfriend" (from More Than a Woman, 2002)	Tamar Braxton; Toni Braxton; Darryl Harper; Irving Lorenzo; Andre Parker; Ricky Rouse; Tupac Shakur; Tyrone Wrice	Irv Gotti; Chink Santana	3:44
8.	"Give It Back" (featuring Big Tymers) (from More Than a Woman, 2002)	Tamar Braxton; Toni Braxton; Byron Thomas; Bryan Williams	Mannie Fresh	3:39
9.	"The Time of Our Lives" (duet with Il Divo) (from Libra, 2005 and Voices from the FIFA World Cup, 2006)	Jörgen Elofsson	Steve Mac	3:18
10.	"He Wasn't Man Enough (Junior Vasquez Marathon Remix)" (from Un-Break My Heart: The Remix Collection, 2005)	Daniels; Jerkins III; "Darkchild"; Mason Jr.	Junior Vasquez	3:45
11.	"Un-Break My Heart (Frankie Knuckles' Franktidrama club remix)" (from Un-Break My Heart: The Remix Collection, 2005)	Warren	Frankie Knuckles	8:28
12.	"Hit the Freeway" (featuring Loon) (from More Than a Woman, 2002)	Chauncey Hawkins; Pharrell Williams	The Neptunes	3:48
13.	"Come On Over Here" (from Secrets, 1996)	Tony Rich; Marc Nelson; Darrell Spencer	Reid; Rich	3:37
14.	"Let It Flow" (from Secrets, 1996)	Babyface	Babyface	4:23
15.	"The Little Things" (from Ultimate Toni Braxton, 2003)	R. Kelly	R. Kelly	4:32
16.	"Good Life" (performed by The Braxtons) (previous unreleased, 1990)	Ernesto Phillips; Felix Weber	Klarmann/Weber	4:16

== Charts ==
Country	Peak position	Certification	Sales
U.S. Hot R&B/Hip-Hop Albums Chart	48	Not Certified	20,000
