= List of songs recorded by Toni Braxton =

Songs recorded by Toni Braxton
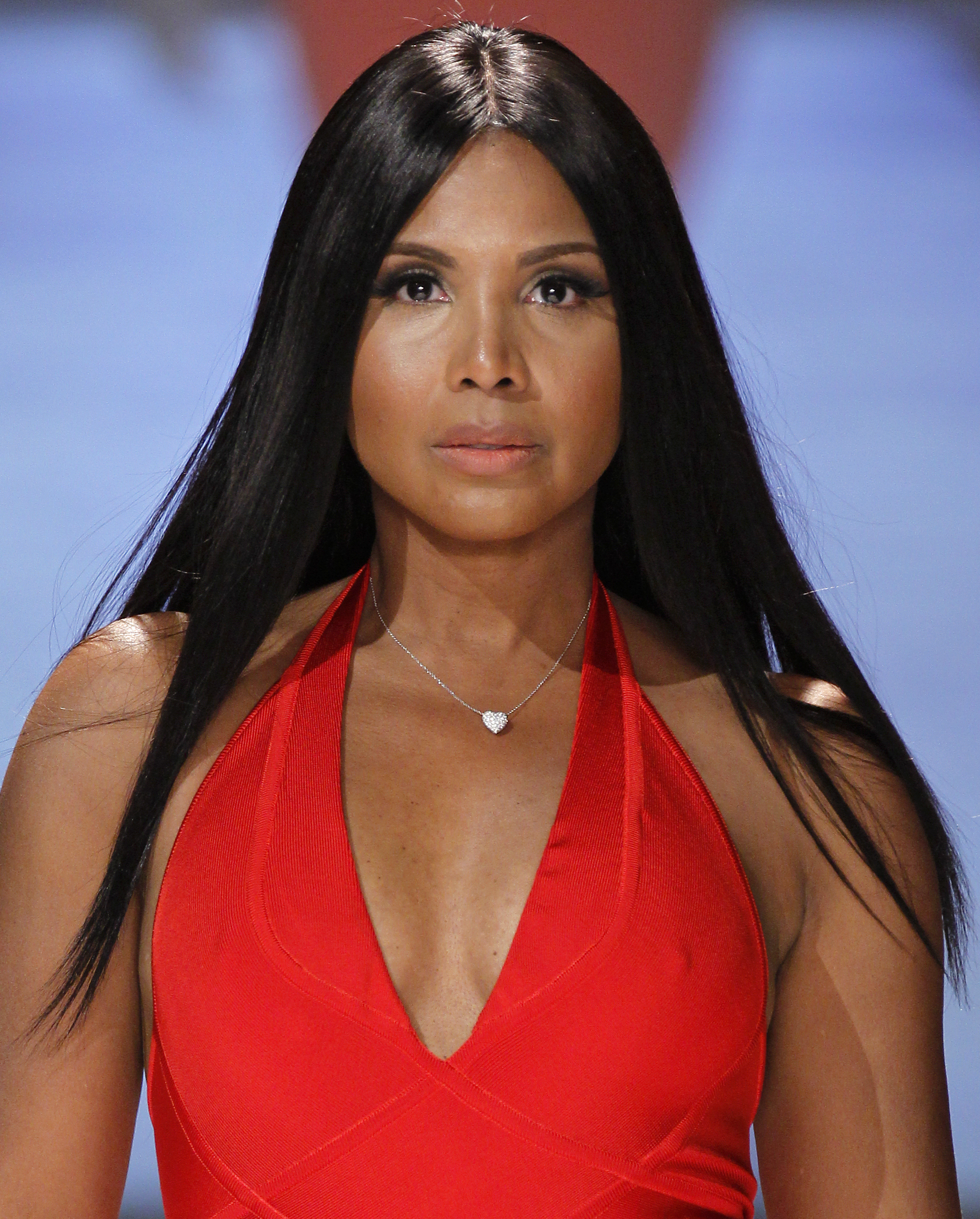
- Braxton in 2013
- Released songs: 122
- Unreleased songs: 37

American singer Toni Braxton has recorded songs for her ten studio albums and has collaborated with other artists for duets and featured songs on their respective albums and charity singles.

== Released songs ==
Song	Writer(s)	Album(s)	Year	Ref.
"Another Sad Love Song"	Babyface / Daryl Simmons	Toni Braxton	1993	
"Best Friend"	Toni Braxton / Vance Taylor	Toni Braxton	1993	
"Breathe Again"	Babyface	Toni Braxton	1993	
"Candlelight"	Gaylor D. / John Barnes	Toni Braxton	1993	
"How Many Ways"	Toni Braxton / Vincent Herbert / Philip Field	Toni Braxton	1993	
"I Belong to You"	Vassal Benford / Ronald Spearman	Toni Braxton	1993	
"Love Affair"	Tim Thomas / Teddy Bishop	Toni Braxton	1993	
"Love Shoulda Brought You Home"	Babyface / Daryl Simmons / Bo Watson	Toni Braxton	1992	
"Give U My Heart" [with Babyface]	Babyface / Daryl Simmons / Bo Watson	Toni Braxton & Boomerang OST	1992	
"Seven Whole Days"	Babyface / Antonio Reid	Toni Braxton	1993	
"Spending My Time with You"	Bo & McArthur	Toni Braxton	1993	
"You Mean the World to Me"	Antonio Reid / Babyface / Daryl Simmons	Toni Braxton	1994	
"Let It Flow"	Babyface	Waiting to Exhale	1995	
"Come on Over Here"	Tony Rich / Marc Nelson / Darrell Spencer	Secrets	1996	
"Find Me a Man"	Babyface	Secrets	1996	
"How Could an Angel Break My Heart" [with Kenny G]	Toni Braxton / Babyface	Secrets	1996	
"I Don't Want To"	R. Kelly	Secrets	1996	
"I Love Me Some Him"	Soulshock and Karlin / Andrea Martin / Gloria Stewart	Secrets	1996	
"In the Late of Night"	Babyface / Jonathan Buck	Secrets	1996	
"Talking in His Sleep"	Toni Braxton / Keith Crouch	Secrets	1996	
"There's No Me Without You"	Babyface	Secrets	1996	
"Un-Break My Heart"	Diane Warren / David Foster	Secrets	1996	
"Why Should I Care"	Babyface	Secrets	1996	
"You're Makin' Me High"	Babyface / Bryce Wilson	Secrets	1996	
"Regresa a Mi"	Diane Warren / David Foster / Marco A Flores	Secrets	1996	
"The Little Things"	R. Kelly	Secrets & Ultimate Toni Braxton	1996	
"Fairy Tale"	Marc Harris / Tommy Sims / Babyface	The Heat	2000	
"Gimme Some" [feat. Left Eye]	Toni Braxton / Jazze Pha / Babyface / Lisa Lopes	The Heat	2000	
"He Wasn't Man Enough"	Rodney Jerkins / Fred Jerkins III / LaShawn Daniels / Harvey Mason, Jr.	The Heat	2000	
"I'm Still Breathing"	Diane Warren / David Foster	The Heat	2000	
"Just Be a Man About It" [feat. Dr. Dre]	Toni Braxton / Johntá Austin / Teddy Bishop / Bryan-Michael Cox	The Heat	2000	
"Maybe"	Toni Braxton / Keith Crouch / John 'Jubu' Smith / Mechallie Jamison / Samuel Gause	The Heat	2000	
"Never Just for a Ring"	Toni Braxton / Daryl Simmons / Pure Soul	The Heat	2000	
"Spanish Guitar"	Diane Warren / David Foster	The Heat	2000	
"Speaking in Tongues"	Toni Braxton / Keri Lewis	The Heat	2000	
"The Art of Love"	Toni Braxton / Keri Lewis	The Heat	2000	
"The Heat"	Toni Braxton / Keri Lewis	The Heat	2000	
"You've Been Wrong"	Toni Braxton / Brian Casey / Brandon Casey / Teddy Bishop / Kevin Hicks	The Heat	2000	
"Christmas In Jamaica" [feat. Shaggy]	Toni Braxton / Donnie Scantz / Keri Lewis / Craig Love	Snowflakes	2001	
"Christmas Time Is Here"	Vince Guaraldi / Lee Mendelson	Snowflakes	2001	
"Have Yourself a Merry Little Christmas"	Ralph Blane / Hugh Martin	Snowflakes	2001	
"Holiday Celebrate"	Toni Braxton / Keri Lewis / Tamar Braxton	Snowflakes	2001	
"Santa Please..."	Toni Braxton / Keri Lewis	Snowflakes	2001	
"Snowflakes Of Love"	Toni Braxton / Keri Lewis	Snowflakes	2001	
"The Christmas Song"	Mel Tormé / Robert Wells	Snowflakes	2001	
"This Time Next Year"	Toni Braxton / Babyface / David Foster	Snowflakes	2001	
"A Better Man"	Ivan Matias / Andrea Martin / Gerrard C. Baker	More Than a Woman	2002	
"Always"	Toni Braxton / Brandy Norwood / Tamar Braxton / Kenisha Pratt / Robert Smith / Blake English	More Than a Woman	2002	
"And I Love You"	Babyface / Daryl Simmons	More Than a Woman	2002	
"Do You Remember When"	Toni Braxton / LaShawn Daniels / Rodney Jerkins / Fred Jerkins III	More Than a Woman	2002	
"Give It Back" [feat. Big Tymers]	Toni Braxton / Tamar Braxton / Byron Thomas / Bryan Williams	More Than a Woman	2002	
"Hit the Freeway" [feat. Loon]	Pharrell Williams / Chauncey Hawkins	More Than a Woman	2002	
"Let Me Show You the Way (Out)	Toni Braxton / Tamar Braxton / Ernest D. Wilson / Keri Lewis	More Than a Woman	2002	
"Lies, Lies, Lies"	Keri Lewis / Stokley Williams	More Than a Woman	2002	
"Me & My Boyfriend"	Toni Braxton / Tamar Braxton / Irv Gotti / Chink Santana	More Than a Woman	2002	
"Rock Me, Roll Me"	Toni Braxton / Tamar Braxton / Keri Lewis	More Than a Woman	2002	
"Selfish"	Toni Braxton / Brandy Norwood / Tamar Braxton / Kenisha Pratt / Robert Smith / Blake English	More Than a Woman	2002	
"Tell Me"	Toni Braxton / Keri Lewis	More Than a Woman	2002	
"Whatchu Need"	Toni Braxton / Kenisha Pratt / LaShawn Daniels / Rodney Jerkins / Fred Jerkins III	More Than a Woman & Ultimate Toni Braxton	2002	
"Finally"	Eric Dawkins / Durrell Babbs / Harvey Mason, Jr. / Damon Thomas / Antonio Dixon	Libra	2005	
"I Wanna Be (Your Baby)"	Kenneth Edmonds / Daryl Simmons / Harvey Mason, Jr. / Damon Thomas	Libra	2005	
"Midnite"	Harold Lilly / Soulshock and Karlin	Libra	2005	
"Please"	Makeba Riddick / Scott Storch / Vincent Herbert / Kameron Houff	Libra	2005	
"Shadowless"	Alex Cantrall / Philip White	Libra	2005	
"Sposed to Be"	Keri Hilson / Patrick "J. Que" Smith / Antonio Dixon / Harvey Mason, Jr. / Damon Thomas	Libra	2005	
"Stupid"	Toni Braxton / Cory Rooney / Keri Lewis	Libra	2005	
"Take This Ring"	Rich Harrison	Libra	2005	
"Trippin' (That's the Way Love Works)"	Toni Braxton / Johntá Austin / Bryan-Michael Cox / Kendrick Dean	Libra	2005	
"What's Good"	Toni Braxton / Johntá Austin / Bryan-Michael Cox / Joe Sample	Libra	2005	
"I Hate You"	Babyface / Eric Dawkins / Harvey Mason, Jr. / Damon Thomas / Antonio Dixon	Libra	2005	
"Long Way Home"	Alex Cantrall / Philip White / Soulshock and Karlin	Libra	2005	
"Suddenly"	Richard Marx	Libra	2005	
"The Time of Our Lives" [with Il Divo]	Jörgen Elofsson	Libra	2006	
"Places"	Unknown	Libra	2005	
"Happily Unhappy"	Jimmy Jam and Terry Lewis / Toni Braxton	Libra, later appearing on Jam & Lewis: Volume One	2005	
"Hands Tied"	Heather Bright / Oak Felder / Harvey Mason, Jr.	Pulse	2010	
"Hero"	Kara DioGuardi / Kasia Livingston / James Fauntleroy II / Steve Russell / Harvey Mason, Jr.	Pulse	2010	
"If I Have to Wait"	Toni Braxton / busbee / Jud Friedman / Allan Rich	Pulse	2010	
"Lookin' at Me"	Makeba Riddick / Lucas Secon	Pulse	2010	
"Make My Heart"	Makeba Riddick / Lucas Secon / Joseph Freeman / Aubreya Gravatt / Theodore Life, Jr.	Pulse	2010	
"No Way"	Michael Warren / Harvey Mason, Jr.	Pulse	2010	
"Pulse"	Christopher Jackson / Chuck Harmony	Pulse	2010	
"Wardrobe"	Taurian Shropshire / Dernst Emile / Harvey Mason, Jr.	Pulse	2010	
"Why Won't You Love Me"	Toni Braxton / Harvey Mason, Jr.	Pulse	2010	
"Woman"	Wayne Hector / Steve Mac	Pulse	2010	
"Yesterday"	Toni Braxton / Jerome Armstrong / Michael White / Terrance Battle / Justin Franks	Pulse	2010	
"Caught" [feat. Mo'Nique]	Harold Lilly / Andre Harris / Vidal Davis / Bryan Sledge	Pulse	2010	
"Rewind"	Toni Braxton / LaShawn Daniels / Tamar Braxton / Chris Brody Brown / Aaron Bay-Schuck	Pulse	2010	
"Stay"	James Rayshawn Smith / Kevin Randolph / Anna Wright / JayShawn Champion / Harvey Mason, Jr.	Pulse	2010	
"The Wave"	Jesse McCartney / Makeba Riddick / MaddScientist	Pulse	2010	
"Yesterday (Single Version)" [feat. Trey Songz]	Toni Braxton / Trey Songz / Jerome Armstrong / Michael White / Terrance Battle / Justin Franks	Pulse	2010	
"I Heart You"	Toni Braxton / Keri Lewis	Non-album Single	2012	
"Heart Attack" (with Babyface)	Toni Braxton / Babyface / Daryl Simmons	Love, Marriage & Divorce	2014	
"Hurt You" (with Babyface)	Toni Braxton / Babyface / Daryl Simmons / Antonio Dixon	Love, Marriage & Divorce	2014	
"I'd Rather Be Broke"	Toni Braxton / Babyface / Antonio Dixon / The Rascals: Khristopher Riddick-Tynes & Leon Thomas / Kameron Glasper	Love, Marriage & Divorce	2014	
"I Wish"	Toni Braxton	Love, Marriage & Divorce	2014	
"Reunited" (with Babyface)	Toni Braxton / Babyface / Daryl Simmons / Antonio Dixon	Love, Marriage & Divorce	2014	
"Roller Coaster" (with Babyface)	Babyface / Daryl Simmons / Antonio Dixon	Love, Marriage & Divorce	2014	
"Take It Back" (with Babyface)	Toni Braxton / Babyface / Daryl Simmons / Antonio Dixon	Love, Marriage & Divorce	2014	
"The D Word" (with Babyface)	Toni Braxton / Babyface	Love, Marriage & Divorce	2014	
"Where Did We Go Wrong" (with Babyface)	Toni Braxton / Babyface	Love, Marriage & Divorce	2014	
"Let's Do It" (with Babyface)	Toni Braxton / Babyface	Love, Marriage & Divorce	2014	
"One" (with Babyface)	Babyface / Daryl Simmons	Love, Marriage & Divorce	2014	
"Deadwood"	Toni Braxton / Fred Ball / Royce Doherty / Kwame Ogoo	Sex & Cigarettes	2018	
"Long As I Live"	Toni Braxton / Antonio Dixon / Paul Boutin	Sex & Cigarettes	2018	
"Coping"	Toni Braxton / Dave Gibson / Stuart Crichton / James Newman	Sex & Cigarettes	2018	
"FOH"	Toni Braxton / Daryl Simmons / Dapo Torimiro / Babyface / Kameron Glasper	Sex & Cigarettes	2018	
"Missin"	Christopher "Tricky" Stewart / Jeremiah Bethea / Pierre Medor	Sex & Cigarettes	2018	
"My Heart" (featuring Colbie Caillat)	Toni Braxton / Dapo Torimiro / Colbie Caillat / Babyface / Kameron Glasper	Sex & Cigarettes	2018	
"Sex & Cigarettes"	Antonio Dixon / Toni Braxton / Patrick "J. Que" Smith / Khristopher Riddick-Tynes / Kevin E. Ross	Sex & Cigarettes	2018	
"Sorry"	Toni Braxton / Fred Ball / Royce Doherty / Kwame Ogoo	Sex & Cigarettes	2018	
"Forgiven"	Toni Braxton	Sex & Cigarettes	2018	
"Dance"	Toni Braxton / Antonio Dixon	Spell My Name	2020	
"Do It"	Toni Braxton / Antonio Dixon / Babyface / Percy Bady	Spell My Name	2020	
"Do It" (with Missy Elliott)	Toni Braxton / Antonio Dixon / Babyface / Percy Bady / Melissa Elliott	Spell My Name	2020	
"Fallin'"	Ashante Reid / Jonathan Martin / Jordon Manswell / Kam Corvet / Toni Braxton	Spell My Name	2020	
"Gotta Move On" (featuring H.E.R.)	Toni Braxton / Jeremih / Percy Bady	Spell My Name	2020	
"Happy Without Me"	Frank Brim / G'hara "PK" Degeddingseze / Kevin Ross / Kirby Lauryen / Toni Braxton	Spell My Name	2020	
"Nothin'"	Babyface / Dapo Torimiro / Kam Parker / Kameron Glasper	Spell My Name	2020	
"O.V.E.Rr."	Angelica Vila / Antonio Dixon / Patrick "J. Que" Smith / Toni Braxton	Spell My Name	2020	
"Saturday Night"	Badrilla Bourelly / Christopher Braide / Toni Braxton / Tyler Johnson	Spell My Name	2020	
"Spell My Name"	Akeel Henry / Antonio Dixon / Johnny Yukon / Toni Braxton	Spell My Name	2020	

== Unreleased songs ==
Title	Writer(s)	Album	Recorded	Leak	Ref
"You For Myself"	Ivan Matias; Jorge 'G-Man' Corante	Secrets	1996	No	
"Be The Man"	Toni Braxton; Keri Lewis	The Heat	1999	Yes	
"Dear Abby"	Toni Braxton; Keri Lewis	The Heat	1999	Yes	
"Give It To Me"	Johntá Austin; Teddy Bishop	The Heat	1999	Yes	
"Someone To Love"	Toni Braxton; Keri Lewis	The Heat	1999	Yes	
"No More Love" (feat. Irv Gotti)	Toni Braxton; Irv Gotti; Chink Santana; Luther Vandross; Parliament	More Than A Woman	2001	Yes	
"I Can't"	Charlene Gilliam; Curtis Richardson; Justin Gray; Kevin McKenzie	More Than A Woman	2001	No	
"I'll Risk It All"	Charmelle Cofield; Guillermo E Edgehill, Jr.	More Than A Woman	2001	No	
"Like U Do"	Jawaan "Smoke" Peacock; Bud'da; Jakgeem N Mays	More Than A Woman	2001	No	
"Oh No"	Monica Arnold; Blu Cantrell; Tricky Stewart; Thabiso 'TAB' Nkhereanye; Wirlie Morris	Libra	2005	No	
"Almost There"	Keri Hilson; Patrick "J. Que" Smith; Traci Hale; Melvin 'St. Nick' Coleman	Libra	2004	No	
"Never Get Over"	Toni Braxton; LaShawn Daniels; Melvin 'St. Nick' Coleman	Libra	2004	No	
"The Confession"	Babyface; Daryl Simmons; Harvey Mason, Jr.; Damon Thomas	Libra	2004	No	
"Little Something"	Patrick "J. Que" Smith	Libra	2005	No	
"Sounds of Making Love"	Jason Boyd; Lamont Maxwell; Quinnes Parker	Libra	2005	No	
"Till I'm Thru"	Jason Boyd	Libra	2005	No	
"Can't Stop Now"	Babyface; Harvey Mason, Jr.; Damon Thomas	Libra	2005	Yes	
"I Like It Like That"	Toni Braxton; Jimmy Jam & Terry Lewis; Bobby Ross Avila; Issiah 'IZ' Avila	Libra	2004	Yes	
"Shake and Move"	Toni Braxton; Keri Lewis	Libra	2004	Yes	
"You Got It"	Toni Braxton; Keri Lewis	Libra	2004	Yes	
"Don't Sleep"	Heather Bright; Warren 'Oak' Felder	Pulse	2008	No	
"Entertaining Angels"	Heather Bright; Warren 'Oak' Felder	Pulse	2008	No	
"I Want You Back"	Jesse McCartney; Theodore "Madd Scientist" Thomas; Dwight Watson; Ericka Watson; Sherry Kondor	Pulse	2008	No	
"Twice As Hard"	Heather Bright; Warren 'Oak' Felder	Pulse	2008	No	
"Clockwork"	Delisha Thomas; Dernst Emile II	Pulse	2008	Yes	
"Don't Leave"	Robin Thicke; Pro Jay	Pulse	2008	Yes	
"Get Loose"	Rodney "Darkchild" Jerkins; Faløn King; Kalenna Harper	Pulse	2008	Yes	
"I Hate Love"	Claude Kelly; Mikkel Eirksen; Tor Erik Hermansen	Pulse	2008	Yes	
"In the Morning"	Dernst Emile II; Anesha Birchett; Antea Birchett	Pulse	2008	Yes	
"It's You"	Shaffer Smith; Jonathan Rotem	Pulse	2008	Yes	
"Lookin' at Me" (feat. Sean Paul)	Makeba Riddick; Lucas Secon	Pulse	2008	Yes	
"Melt (Like an Iceberg)"	Claude Kelly; Cartsen Schack; Kenneth Karlin	Pulse	2008	Yes	
"My Ring"	Jesse McCartney; Makeba Riddick; Theodore Thomas	Pulse	2008	Yes	
"Not A Chance"	Toni Braxton; Keri Lewis; Harvey Mason	Pulse	2008	Yes	
"Save Me"	Kasia Livingston; Andrew Willams Jr.; Fernando Garibay	Pulse	2008	Yes	
"Save Me" (Alternate Version)	Kasia Livingston; Andrew Williams Jr.; Jonathan Rotem	Pulse	2008	Yes	
"The Break Up"	Toni Braxton	Pulse	2008	Yes	
"I Believe in You"	Toni Braxton; Keri Lewis; Davy Nathan	Twist of Faith OST	2013	Yes	
"I Surrender All"	Toni Braxton; Keri Lewis; Davy Nathan	Twist of Faith OST	2013	Yes	
"This Very Moment" (with David Julian Hirsh)	Toni Braxton; Keri Lewis; Davy Nathan	Twist of Faith OST	2013	Yes	
