= Playlist: The Very Best of Toni Braxton =

Greatest hits album by Toni Braxton
- Released: October 28, 2008
- Recorded: 1993–2002
- Genre: R&B
- Length: 64:22
- Label: Legacy, LaFace
- Producer: Babyface; Vassal Benford; Keith Crouch; David Foster; Vincent Herbert; Hex Hector; Rodney "Darkchild" Jerkins; Andrea Martin; Ivan Matias; The Neptunes; L.A. Reid; Daryl Simmons; Bryce Wilson

Toni Braxton chronology
The Best So Far (2007)	Playlist: The Very Best of Toni Braxton (2008)	Pulse (2010)

Alternative cover
- 2013 edition

Playlist: The Very Best of Toni Braxton is the fourth greatest hits compilation album by R&B singer Toni Braxton. It is a part of Sony BMG's Playlist series. It was released in the United States on October 28, 2008.

== Background and content ==
Playlist: The Very Best of Toni Braxton is the fourth compilation released by Braxton, following The Essential Toni Braxton, in 2007. The album was released on October 28, 2008, by Legacy Recordings, being part of Sony BMG's Playlist series. The track list contains Braxton most successful singles, with a few different tracks, such as "A Better Man" from her fourth studio album, "More Than a Woman" (2002), "Maybe", a single from "The Heat" and a Hex Hector remix for "Spanish Guitar".

In 2013, a new version of the compilation was released, with a different cover art and track list. The new edition contains the singles "Another Sad Love Song", "I Don't Want To" and "Just Be a Man About It", who were scrapped from the first edition, as well as Braxton's latest singles, "Yesterday" and "Hands Tied".

== Track listing ==
Disc one
No.	Title	Writer(s)	Producer(s)	Length
1.	"He Wasn't Man Enough" (from The Heat, 2000)	LaShawn Daniels; Fred Jerkins III; Rodney "Darkchild" Jerkins; Harvey Mason, Jr.	Darkchild	4:22
2.	"Hit the Freeway" (from More Than a Woman, 2002)	Chauncey Hawkins; Pharrell Williams	The Neptunes	3:48
3.	"You Mean the World to Me" (from Toni Braxton, 1993)	Kenneth "Babyface" Edmonds; L.A. Reid; Daryl Simmons	Babyface; Reid; Simmons	4:57
4.	"Un-Break My Heart" (from Secrets, 1996)	Diane Warren	David Foster	4:31
5.	"How Could an Angel Break My Heart" (from Secrets, 1996)	Babyface; Toni Braxton	Babyface	4:21
6.	"Maybe" (from The Heat, 2000)	Braxton; Keith Crouch; Samuel Gause; Mechalie Jamison; John Smith	Crouch	3:08
7.	"You're Makin' Me High" (from Secrets, 1996)	Babyface; Bryce Wilson	Babyface; Wilson	4:28
8.	"How Many Ways" (from Toni Braxton, 1993)	Braxton; Philip Field; Vincent Herbert	Herbert	4:49
9.	"Seven Whole Days" (from Toni Braxton, 1993)	Babyface; Reid; Simmons	Babyface; Reid; Simmons	6:20
10.	"A Better Man" (from More Than a Woman, 2002)	Gerrard C. Baker; Andrea Martin; Ivan Matias	Martin; Matias	3:58
11.	"Breathe Again" (from Toni Braxton, 1993)	Babyface	Babyface; Reid; Simmons	4:30
12.	"I Belong to You" (from Toni Braxton, 1993)	Vassal Benford; Ronald Spearman	Benford	3:54
13.	"Let It Flow" (from Waiting to Exhale Soundtrack, 1996)	Babyface	Babyface	4:09
14.	"Spanish Guitar" (HQ2 radio edit)" (from Platinum & Gold Collection, 2004)	Warren	Hex Hector	6:42

2013 version
No.	Title	Writer(s)	Producer(s)	Length
1.	"How Could an Angel Break My Heart (with Kenny G)"	Babyface; Braxton	Babyface	4:20
2.	"Let It Flow"	Babyface	Babyface	4:09
3.	"Breathe Again"	Babyface	Babyface; Reid; Simmons	4:15
4.	"You Mean the World to Me"	Babyface; Reid; Simmons	Babyface; Reid; Simmons	3:59
5.	"How Many Ways"	Braxton; Herbert	Herbert	4:26
6.	"You're Making Me High"	Babyface; Wilson	Babyface; Wilson	4:06
7.	"Another Sad Love Song"	Babyface; Simmons	Babyface; Reid; Simmons	3:50
8.	"Hands Tied"	Heather Bright; Warren Felder; Harvey Mason, Jr.	Mason, Jr.; Oak	3:54
9.	"Spanish Guitar"	Warren	Foster	4:49
10.	"Un-Break My Heart"	Warren	Foster	4:28
11.	"I Don't Want To"	R. Kelly	R. Kelly	4:17
12.	"Just Be a Man About It"	Johntá Austin; Teddy Bishop; Braxton; Bryan-Michael Cox	Bishop; Braxton; Cox	4:49
13.	"Yesterday"	Jerome Armstrong; Terrance Battle; Braxton; Justin Franks; Michael White	DJ Frank E	3:48
14.	"He Wasn't Man Enough"	Daniels; Jerkins III; Jerkins; Mason, Jr.	Darkchild	4:22
