= The Best So Far (Toni Braxton album) =

Greatest hits album by Toni Braxton
- Released: 2007
- Recorded: 1992–2003
- Genre: R&B
- Label: Som Livre

Toni Braxton chronology
The Essential Toni Braxton (2007)	The Best So Far (2007)	Playlist: The Very Best of Toni Braxton (2008)

The Best So Far is a greatest hits compilation album by R&B singer Toni Braxton released exclusively in Brazil.

The track list contains Braxton most successful singles, such as "How Could an Angel Break My Heart", "Breathe Again", "You're Makin Me High", "He Wasn't Man Enough", "You Mean the World to Me" and a few different tracks as the duet with Il Divo, "The Time of Our Lives" and "Why Should I Care".

The album was released at the same time Braxton's album The Essential Toni Braxton was released around the world. All songs present in "The Best So Far" are included in "The Essential" with the exception of "Spanish Guitar" which is the "Royal Garden" remix not the album version.

The album "The Essential Toni Braxton" was never released in Brazil. The track list for the Brazilian version was composed with the songs from the compilation,

== Reception ==
The album was a success in Brazil, reaching a gold status for selling over 30,000 copies, and later receiving a platinum certification, for selling over 60,000 copies.

== Track listing ==
No.	Title	Writer(s)	Producer(s)	Length
1.	"Un-Break My Heart" (from Secrets, 1996)	Diane Warren	David Foster	4:28
2.	"How Could an Angel Break My Heart" (from Secrets, 1996)	Babyface; Braxton	Babyface	4:20
3.	"I Don't Want To" (from Secrets, 1996)	R. Kelly	Kelly	4:16
4.	"Breathe Again" (from Toni Braxton, 1993)	Babyface	Babyface; Reid; Simmons	4:16
5.	"You're Makin' Me High" (from Secrets, 1996)	Babyface; Bryce Wilson	Babyface, Wilson	4:04
6.	"Another Sad Love Song" (from Toni Braxton, 1993)	Babyface; Simmons	Babyface; Reid; Simmons	3:49
7.	"He Wasn't Man Enough" (from The Heat, 2000)	LaShawn Daniels; Fred Jerkins III; Rodney "Darkchild" Jerkins; Harvey Mason Jr.	Rodney "Darkchild" Jerkins; LaShawn "Big Shiz" Daniels	4:00
8.	"Spanish Guitar" (from The Heat, 2000)	Warren	Foster	4:47
9.	"Let It Flow" (from Secrets, 1996)	Babyface	Babyface	4:21
10.	"You Mean the World to Me" (from Toni Braxton, 1993)	Babyface; Reid; Simmons	Babyface; Reid; Simmons	4:48
11.	"Why Should I Care" (from Secrets, 1996)	Babyface	Babyface	4:22
12.	"Love Shoulda Brought You Home" (from Toni Braxton, 1993)	Kenneth "Babyface" Edmonds; Daryl Simmons; Bo Watson	Babyface; L.A. Reid; Daryl Simmons	4:49
13.	"How Many Ways (R. Kelly remix)" (from Toni Braxton, 1993)	Braxton; Philip Field; Vincent Herbert	Herbert	3:51
14.	"The Time of Our Lives" (duet with Il Divo) (from Libra, 2005 and Voices from the FIFA World Cup, 2006)	Jörgen Elofsson	Steve Mac	4:42

== Charts and certifications ==
=== Weekly charts ===
Chart (2007)	Peak position
Brazil Albums (Pro-Música Brasil)	2

=== Certifications and sales ===
Region	Certification	Certified units/sales
Brazil (Pro-Música Brasil)	Platinum	60,000^{*}
^{*} Sales figures based on certification alone.
