= The Best So Far =

The Best So Far may refer to:

- The Best So Far (D'Angelo album)
- The Best So Far (Cindy Morgan album)
- The Best So Far (Robbie Williams album)
- The Best So Far (Toni Braxton album)
- The Best So Far, by Anne Murray
- The Best So Far... 2018 Tour Edition, by Celine Dion
