= Another Sad Love Song =

1993 single by Toni Braxton

Single by Toni Braxton

from the album Toni Braxton
- B-side: "Give U My Heart"
- Released: June 11, 1993
- Studio: LaCoCo, Doppler (Atlanta)
- Length: 5:01
- Label: LaFace
- Songwriters: Daryl Simmons; Babyface
- Producers: Babyface; Daryl Simmons; L.A. Reid

Toni Braxton singles chronology
"Love Shoulda Brought You Home" (1992)	"Another Sad Love Song" (1993)	"Breathe Again" (1993)

Music video
- "Another Sad Love Song" on YouTube

"Another Sad Love Song" is a song by American singer-songwriter Toni Braxton. Written and produced by Daryl Simmons and Babyface, featuring additional production from L.A. Reid, it was released as the lead single and its opening track from Braxton's self-titled debut album (1993) on June 11, 1993, by LaFace Records and Arista Records. Lyrically, it talks about Braxton complaining that every song played on the radio is a reminder of her ex-boyfriend.

"Another Sad Love Song" received widespread acclaim from music critics and earned Braxton her first-ever Grammy Award for Best Female R&B Vocal Performance at the 36th Annual Grammy Awards. It proved to be a success, giving Braxton her first top ten hit on the US Billboard Hot 100 and Cash Box Top 100, as well as the Billboard Adult Contemporary chart, while narrowly missing the top position of Billboard's Hot R&B/Hip-Hop Songs chart by peaking at number two. Internationally, the song reached the top twenty in Canada and the United Kingdom, the top thirty in Iceland and the Netherlands, and the top forty in Scotland and on a composite Eurochart Hot 100.

Three different music videos for the song were produced. The first version was filmed in 1992 in black-and-white and featured the original music. The second version was filmed in May 1993 and was shown in color with exterior scenes from the first version. The third version was remixed to appeal to a wider audiences and was primarily shown in Europe. "Another Sad Love Song" has been performed at most of Braxton's concerts, and is featured on many of her greatest hits collections, including Ultimate Toni Braxton (2003), Platinum & Gold Collection (2004), The Essential Toni Braxton (2007) and Breathe Again: The Best of Toni Braxton (2009).

== Background and composition ==
After Braxton released her first solo single, "Love Shoulda Brought You Home", in 1992, as the soundtrack of the film Boomerang, which became her first top-40 on the Billboard Hot 100 chart, she released "Another Sad Love Song" as the lead single from her self-titled debut album, Toni Braxton, on June 11, 1993.

"Another Sad Love Song" was written and produced by Babyface and Daryl Simmons, with L.A. Reid also producing it. Lyrically, "Another Sad Love Song" talks about Braxton complaining that every song played on the radio is a reminder of her ex-boyfriend. In the chorus, she sings, "It’s just another sad love song/Rackin’ my brain like crazy/Guess I’m all torn up/Be it fast or slow/It doesn’t let go/Or shake me/And it’s all because of you."

== Critical reception ==
The song received positive reviews from the majority of the music critics. Ron Wynn of AllMusic named it a highlight from the album, writing that "Braxton's husky, enticing voice sounds hypnotic on the dismayed track." Daryl Easlea of BBC Music praised that it "showed how well an accomplished production team could perform when married with a superior vocalist." Larry Flick from Billboard magazine said, "Braxton cleanly proves herself as a future diva on this slow and rhythmic urban ballad". He added, "The cool thing about Toni is that she's clearly not afraid to get vocally raw and raspy, even when the instrumentation is as smooth as it is here. That kind of edge places this already delicious jam head-and-shoulders above the ever-crowded competitive ranks." Mitchell May of Chicago Tribune was very positive, writing that on the track, "the ache in her voice is all too real." Dave Sholin from the Gavin Report described it as "another L.A., Babyface and Daryl Simmons masterpiece by an artist with a great future". Connie Johnson of Los Angeles Times praised Braxton for "going to town on the soul-infused track."

Pan-European magazine Music & Media named it "without doubt one of the best soul ballads of 1993". Ralph Tee from Music Week's RM Dance Update remarked that she "steps out with a vocal Whitney would be proud of on a stylish, medium-paced two stepper that grows on you." Another RM editor, James Hamilton, named it a "superb sultry slinky jogger" in his weekly dance column. A reviewer from People Magazine called its intro "coiling, almost eerie", "bolstered by her full-throated alto." John McAlley of Rolling Stone was extremely positive, writing that, "Another Sad Love Song – with its dynamic vocal, gargantuan hook and clever song-with-in-a-song lyric – surely ranks with 'End of the Road', 'I'm Your Baby Tonight' and 'Every Little Step' as one of LaFace's greatest triumphs." McAlley also wrote the song "reinforces Braxton's lovelorn persona, as do several other midtempo ballads that L.A., Babyface and Daryl Simmons have front-loaded into Toni Braxton."

"Another Sad Love Song" became Braxton's first song to receive a Grammy Award nomination in 1994, for the category "Best R&B Vocal Performance, Female", ultimately winning the award.

== Chart performance ==
"Another Sad Love Song" became Braxton's first top-10 hit on the US Billboard Hot 100, peaking at number seven, while on the Billboard Hot R&B/Hip-Hop Songs chart, the song reached higher, peaking at number two. The single also peaked at number four on the Cash Box Top 100, and sold 500,000 copies domestically, earning a gold certification from the Recording Industry Association of America. In 1993, the song charted on the UK Singles Chart, reaching a peak of number 51, on September 18. However, in 1994, the song peaked at number 15, becoming its official peak position, on April 2. Elsewhere, the song performed modestly, reaching number 23 on the Dutch Top 40 chart and number 44 on the New Zealand Singles Chart.

== Music video ==
Braxton in the remix video, singing the song, while rain is falling down her window.

The accompanying music video for "Another Sad Love Song" was released in three different versions. The first version was directed by Antoine Fuqua and filmed in 1992 in black-and-white and featured the original music. The second version was directed by Fuqua and Ralph Ziman and filmed in May 1993 and was shown in color with exterior scenes from the first version. The third version was remixed to appeal to a wider audiences and was primarily shown in Europe.

On her DVD, "From Toni with Love... The Video Collection", two versions of the video are also featured: the "black and white" and the "colorful version". Braxton commented that she "was really feeling the song, because I was ending a relationship," she said.

== Track listings ==
- US CD single
1. "Another Sad Love Song" (remix radio edit) – 4:40
2. "Another Sad Love Song" (extended remix) – 5:27
3. "Another Sad Love Song" (Smoothed Out version) – 4:23
4. "Another Sad Love Song" (remix instrumental) – 5:01
5. "Another Sad Love Song" (album version) – 5:01
- UK CD single (1993)
1. "Another Sad Love Song" (radio edit) – 3:53
2. "Give U My Heart" (album radio edit) (Babyface featuring Toni Braxton) – 4:09
3. "Another Sad Love Song" (Smoothed Out version) – 4:23
4. "Another Sad Love Song" (album version) – 5:01
- UK CD single (1994)
1. "Another Sad Love Song" (album version) – 5:01
2. "Another Sad Love Song" (remix radio edit) – 4:43
3. "Another Sad Love Song" (extended remix) – 5:28
4. "Another Sad Love Song" (Smoothed Out version) – 4:23
- German CD single
1. "Another Sad Love Song" (radio edit) – 3:53
2. "Another Sad Love Song" (Smoothed Out version) – 4:23
3. "Another Sad Love Song" (extended remix) – 5:28
4. "Another Sad Love Song" (album version) – 5:01
- UK collectors EP
1. "Another Sad Love Song" (album version) – 5:01
2. "Breathe Again" (live from The Apollo) – 4:30
3. "Best Friend" (album version) – 4:28
4. "Give U My Heart" (Boomerang version) (Babyface featuring Toni Braxton) – 5:04

== Charts ==
=== Weekly charts ===
Chart (1993–1994)	Peak position
Australia (ARIA)	57
Canada Top Singles (RPM)	16
Canada Adult Contemporary (RPM)	16
Canada Contemporary Hit Radio (The Record)	11
Europe (Eurochart Hot 100)	40
Europe (European Dance Radio)	20
Europe (European Hit Radio)	37
Germany (GfK)	60
Iceland (Íslenski Listinn Topp 40)	30
Israel (Israeli Singles Chart)	28
Netherlands (Dutch Top 40)	23
Netherlands (Single Top 100)	43
New Zealand (Recorded Music NZ)	44
Scottish Singles Sales (Official Charts)	37
UK Singles (Official Charts)	15
UK Airplay (ERA) (1993)	88
UK Airplay (ERA) (1994)	14
UK Dance (Music Week)	22
UK Club Chart (Music Week)	59
US Billboard Hot 100	7
US Adult Contemporary (Billboard)	8
US Dance Singles Sales (Billboard)	32
US Hot R&B/Hip-Hop Songs (Billboard)	2
US Pop Airplay (Billboard)	7
US Rhythmic Airplay (Billboard)	8
US Cash Box Top 100	4
Zimbabwe (ZIMA)	2

=== Year-end charts ===
Chart (1993)	Position
US Billboard Hot 100	46
US Adult Contemporary (Billboard)	50
US Hot R&B Singles (Billboard)	15

Chart (1994)	Position
Brazil (Mais Tocadas)	72
Netherlands (Dutch Top 40)	185
UK Singles (OCC)	123
US Adult Contemporary (Billboard)	50

== Certifications ==
Region	Certification	Certified units/sales
United States (RIAA)	Gold	500,000^{^}
^{^} Shipments figures based on certification alone.

== Release history ==
Region	Date	Format(s)	Label(s)	Ref.
United States	June 11, 1993	—N/a	LaFace	
Australia	August 23, 1993	12-inch vinyl; CD; cassette	LaFace	
Sweden	August 30, 1993	CD	Arista; LaFace	
United Kingdom	September 6, 1993	7-inch vinyl; 12-inch vinyl; CD	Arista; LaFace	
Japan	September 22, 1993	Mini-CD	Arista; LaFace	
United Kingdom (re-release)	March 21, 1994	7-inch vinyl; CD; cassette	Arista; LaFace	
Australia (re-release)	September 19, 1994	CD; cassette	LaFace	
