= Ultimate Toni Braxton =

Greatest hits album by Toni Braxton
- Released: November 4, 2003
- Recorded: 1992–2003
- Length: 75:23
- Label: Arista

Toni Braxton chronology
More Than a Woman (2002)	Ultimate Toni Braxton (2003)	Platinum & Gold Collection (2004)

Alternative cover
- Alternative cover

Ultimate Toni Braxton, released in 2003, is the first greatest hits collection by R&B singer Toni Braxton. It features many of her greatest hits, and includes all the singles from her debut Toni Braxton and all but one of the singles from her second album Secrets. Her albums The Heat and More Than a Woman are fairly underrepresented, as only two and one songs are included from each album, respectively. The songs on Ultimate are not the actual album versions but radio edits, and the version of "Seven Whole Days" is live.

The album also includes two new songs, "Whatchu Need" (produced by Rodney Jerkins) and "The Little Things" (produced by R. Kelly). Toni's first single "Give U My Heart" (a duet with Babyface) that was included on the "Boomerang" soundtrack, and a remix of "Un-Break My Heart". There is also a Box Set edition of the album which contains six additional remixes. According to Billboard, the album has sold 400,000 copies as of May 2013. It was certified Gold in the UK, in July 2013.

== Background and content ==
After releasing four studio albums, the last, More Than a Woman (2002), was a chart disappointment, being her first studio album to not reach the Top 10 and to not produce any hit singles. Later, Braxton discovered she was pregnant with her second child, which led her label to not release any more singles and the promotion of the album was interrupted. Ultimately, her label decided to release a greatest hits compilation in 2003. The compilation titled Ultimate Toni Braxton was released on November 4, 2003, by Arista Records.

=== Songs ===
The track list is composed of Braxton's 18 songs, with 15 being her biggest hits, since her debut single with Babyface, "Give U My Heart", from 1992, until her biggest hit to date, "Un-Break My Heart", from 1996. The album also features other hits of her career, such as "Love Shoulda Brought You Home", "Another Sad Love Song", "Breathe Again", "You're Makin' Me High", "He Wasn't Man Enough" and many more. The album also features two new tracks, "Whatchu Need", produced by Rodney "Darkchild" Jerkins, and "The Little Things", produced by R. Kelly. It also features a live version of "Seven Whole Days" and a remix of "Un-Break My Heart" on the regular edition. The "limited edition" of the album contains 2 discs, with the second disc featuring six remixes of her hits.

== Critical reception ==
Professional ratings
Review scores
Source	Rating
AllMusic	4.5/5 stars
MTV Asia	5/10
The Rolling Stone Album Guide	4/5 stars

Stephen Thomas Erlewine from AllMusic gave the compilation four and a half out of five stars, writing that, "her 18-track hits collection works well even through her shifts in style – she is a confident enough performer to sell both the slow romantic ballads and material that swings harder. That's not to say that there aren't some slow spots here – the previously unreleased cuts are no great shakes, and sometimes the abundance of slow numbers makes things sound too samey – but she was one of the top urban soul singers of the '90s, and this is the album that illustrates why." The Rolling Stone Album Guide, rating the album four out of five stars, noted that "Ultimate renders most of her studio albums redundant, and the steady increase in sass as her career progressis fun to track."

== Commercial performance ==
Ultimate Toni Braxton charted modestly on the US Billboard 200 chart, only reaching number 119. However, it fared better on the US Top R&B/Hip-Hop Albums chart, peaking at number 43. Even with the modest peak, the album managed to sell over 400,000 copies in the United States, as of 2013. In the UK, the album charted higher, peaking at number 23. In July 2013, Ultimate Toni Braxton was certified Gold by the British Phonographic Industry (BPI), for selling over 100,000 copies.

== Track listing ==
Ultimate Toni Braxton track listing
No.	Title	Writer(s)	Producer(s)	Length
1.	"Give U My Heart" (duet with Babyface)	Kenneth Edmonds; Antonio Reid; Daryl Simmons; Bo Watson	Babyface; L.A. Reid; Simmons^{[a]}	4:00
2.	"Love Shoulda Brought You Home"	Edmonds; Reid; Simmons; Watson	Babyface; Reid; Simmons	4:51
3.	"Another Sad Love Song"	Edmonds; Simmons	Babyface; Reid; Simmons	3:49
4.	"Breathe Again"	Edmonds	Babyface; Reid; Simmons	4:15
5.	"Seven Whole Days" (live)	Edmonds; Reid		4:40
6.	"You Mean the World to Me"	Edmonds; Reid; Simmons	Babyface; Reid; Simmons	3:59
7.	"How Many Ways"	Toni Braxton; Vincent Herbert	Herbert	4:26
8.	"You're Makin' Me High"	Braxton; Edmonds; Bryce Wilson	Babyface; Wilson	4:06
9.	"Let It Flow"	Edmonds	Babyface	4:09
10.	"Un-Break My Heart"	Diane Warren	David Foster	4:28
11.	"I Love Me Some Him"	Kenneth Karlin; Carsten Schack; Andrea Martin; Gloria Stewart	Soulshock & Karlin	4:36
12.	"I Don't Want To"	R. Kelly	Kelly	4:17
13.	"He Wasn't Man Enough"	LaShawn Daniels; Fred Jerkins III; Rodney "Darkchild" Jerkins; Harvey Mason Jr.	Darkchild	3:59
14.	"Just Be a Man About It"	Braxton; Johntá Austin; Teddy Bishop; Bryan-Michael Cox	Bishop; Braxton^{[a]}; Cox^{[a]}	4:16
15.	"Hit the Freeway" (featuring Loon)	Pharrell Williams; Chauncey Hawkins	The Neptunes	3:47
16.	"Whatchu Need"	Braxton; Daniels; R. Jerkins; F. Jerkins; Kenisha Pratt	Darkchild	3:38
17.	"The Little Things"	Kelly	Kelly	4:31
18.	"Un-Break My Heart" (Soul-Hex Anthem radio edit)	Warren	Foster; Hex Hector^{[b]}	3:35
Total length:				75:23

Limited edition
No.	Title	Writer(s)	Producer(s)	Length
19.	"Un-Break My Heart" (Frankie Knuckles Franktidrama club mix)	Warren	Foster; Frankie Knuckles^{[b]}	8:36
20.	"You're Makin' Me High" (Salaam Remi's Norfside mix)	Braxton; Edmonds; Wilson	Babyface; Wilson; Salaam Remi^{[b]}	4:18
21.	"How Many Ways" (R. Kelly mix)	Braxton; Herbert; Kelly	Herbert; Kelly^{[b]}	5:46
22.	"I Don't Want To" (Frankie Knuckles Franktified mix)	Kelly	Kelly; Knuckles^{[b]}	10:57
23.	"Hit the Freeway" (Goldtrix mix)	Williams; Hawkins	The Neptunes; Goldtrix^{[b]}	7:17
24.	"He Wasn't Man Enough" (Forces of Nature mix)	Daniels; R. Jerkins; F. Jerkins; Mason	Darkchild; Forces of Natur^{[b]}	5:50

Notes

- ^{^[a]} signifies co-producer(s)
- ^{^[b]} signifies additional producer(s)

== Charts ==
Chart performance for Ultimate Toni Braxton
Chart (2003)	Peak position
Japanese Albums (Oricon)	172
Scottish Albums (Official Charts)	53
Swiss Albums (Schweizer Hitparade)	86
UK Albums (Official Charts)	23
UK R&B Albums (Official Charts)	14
US Billboard 200	119
US Top R&B/Hip-Hop Albums (Billboard)	43

== Certifications ==
Certifications for Ultimate Toni Braxton
Region	Certification	Certified units/sales
United Kingdom (BPI)	Gold	100,000^{*}
^{*} Sales figures based on certification alone.
