= More Than a Woman (album) =

Studio album by Toni Braxton
- Released: November 18, 2002
- Recorded: March 2001 – August 2002
- Studio: Denim's Den (Los Angeles) (Note: Tracks 1–3, 5, 6 and 10); Patchwerk (Atlanta) (Note: Track 2); Sound on Sound (New York City) (Note: Track 3); The Record Plant (Hollywood) (Note: Tracks 4, 7 and 12); Circle House (Miami) (Note: Track 4); Westlake (West Hollywood, California) (Note: Strings on track 6); Track Record (North Hollywood, California) (Note: Tracks 7 and 12); Baseway (Los Angeles); Silent Sound (Atlanta) (Note: Tracks 8 and 11); Darkchild (Pleasantville, New Jersey) (Note: Track 8); The Hit Factory Criteria (Miami); Capitol (Hollywood) (Note: Strings on track 8); The Enterprise (Burbank, California) (Note: Track 9); Brandon's Way (Hollywood) (Note: Track 11); The Hit Factory (New York City) (Note: Track 12)
- Genre: R&B; pop; hip hop
- Length: 50:08
- Label: Arista
- Producer: Babyface; Gerrard C. Baker; Big Bert; Irv Gotti; Rodney Jerkins; Keri Lewis; Mannie Fresh; Andrea Martin; Ivan Matias; The Neptunes; No I.D.; Chink Santana

Toni Braxton chronology
Snowflakes (2001)	More Than a Woman (2002)	Ultimate Toni Braxton (2003)

Singles from More Than a Woman
- 1. "Hit the Freeway" Released: October 21, 2002; 2. "A Better Man" Released: December 9, 2002

More Than a Woman is the fifth studio album by American singer Toni Braxton, released on November 18, 2002, by Arista Records. The album contains both hip hop and urban adult contemporary sounds, as well as some softer and more contemporary melodies. Throughout the project, Braxton worked with her sister Tamar and husband Keri Lewis on most of the songs, who had written and produced material for her previous album. She also worked with hip hop producers and rappers such as Irv Gotti, The Neptunes, Mannie Fresh and Loon, as well as Rodney "Darkchild" Jerkins, protégé Big Bert and singer Brandy.

With More Than a Woman, Braxton continued the transition that began with previous album, The Heat (2000), which pushed her further into the progressive R&B and hip hop market and away from the adult contemporary and pop-soul background of her previous work with Babyface and L.A. Reid. During the production of her first two albums with Arista's subsidiary LaFace Records, Braxton had little control over the creative and artistic steps she took on her albums; however, after signing a new recording contract following a three-year-long dispute with LaFace, she was able to reflect her creative maturity and evolution in the album's writing and recording.

Upon release, the album was generally well received by critics, who felt it was similar to The Heat but lacked its commercial crossover appeal. More Than a Woman debuted at number thirteen on the US Billboard 200 with first week sales of 98,000 copies, becoming Braxton's lowest-charting album by then. While lead single "Hit the Freeway" reached the top 10 in Belgium and Denmark, the single and its parent album failed to impact elsewhere, resulting into lackluster sales in general. Disappointed by its performance, which Braxton attributed to the little promotion activities that the Arista management had arranged for her due to her second pregnancy, she parted with her record label due to the album's commercial failure in April 2003.

== Background ==
In 1992, Braxton signed a solo recording contract with LaFace Records, a joint venture between the producing duo Antonio "L.A." Reid and Kenneth "Babyface" Edmonds from former recording group the Deele, and distributor Arista Records. Her first two studio albums, Toni Braxton (1993) and Secrets (1996), became critical and commercial successes and sold a combined 21 million copies, earning $170 million in worldwide sales. By late 1996, Braxton was still waiting for fair financial rewards. Her recording contract with LaFace was substantially below those of other multi-platinum artists and bound her to refund all kinds of expenses the label had financed in advance, including management fees, taxes, and video budgets, earning Braxton a $1,972 royalty check only. In December 1997, after learning that she accumulated more than $1 million in debts, Braxton became embroiled in a legal dispute with LaFace, when she filed a lawsuit asking to be freed from her long-term contractual obligations to the label in the midst of a contract renegotiation. After then being counter-sued by the label for breach of contract, the singer eventually filed for bankruptcy protection in 1998, a move that stalled all legal proceedings between the two parties.

In January 1999, Braxton mended her relationship with Reid and Babyface, when the lawsuit against LaFace was eventually settled after Braxton was awarded higher royalties, a pay raise, and publishing rights to all songs that she had co-written. Soon after, she resumed recording for The Heat, her first album in four years. In an attempt to move her away from Edmonds's formulaic ballad-driven and adult contemporary-oriented material on her previous albums to establish her relevance with a new generation of music consumers, Braxton took bigger control over the artistic steps on The Heat: She consulted a variety of writers and producers to work with her, including Rodney Jerkins, Bryan-Michael Cox, and Jazze Pha, and co-wrote seven of the 12 songs on the album. Preceded by its uptempo lead single "He Wasn't Man Enough", LaFace released The Heat in April 2000, propelling Braxton back to the top of music charts. At a worldwide sales total in excess of four million copies however, the album was less successful than its predecessors.

== Composition ==
Braxton began work on her fifth studio album in early 2001. More Than a Woman is a diverse blend of danceable club numbers, trademark Braxton ballads and experimental tracks which borrow from the genres of rock and jazz. The album was described as a "variety of sonic colors". Her then-husband Keri Lewis, former Mint Condition keyboardist, co-wrote and had a hand in producing four tracks, while her younger sister Tamar Braxton co-wrote six songs and provides backing vocals on all tracks.

=== Songs ===
The album's first half alternates between edgy hip hop-flavored fare, the club-ready and more experimental R&B. The album opens with the "feisty" "Let Me Show You the Way (Out)". It was described as "a new woman's anthem for 2003" by BBC Music. Over a hammering hip-hop bassline, angry incessant piano chords and Braxton's calm but commanding vocals lies a telling tale of infidelity, which sets the theme for the majority of the album. The second track "Give It Back" is another hip-hop song, which features rapper Big Tymers and it is a "club-ready track". CD Universe described it as a "moody, mid-tempo track, which boasts a bit of hip-hop flavor. The third track "A Better Man" is a "futuristic R&B ballad". The fourth track and the only single of the album "Hit the Freeway" features Loon and it's an edgy hip-hop flavored track. It was described as "a quintessential Neptunes track - melodic synthesiser, staged handclaps and funky drum patterns - later transpires into an impressive slice of pop R&B." According to BBC Music, the chorus: "Farewell my lonely one, nothing else here can be done, I don't ever wanna see you again" is eagerly contagious.

The fifth track "Lies, Lies, Lies" was written by Keri Lewis and it's "a dramatic, "he-done-me-wrong" ballad with mostly live instrumentation (including rock-charged guitar) and a background vocal arrangement featuring the Braxton sisters. Toni's vocals also provide a mix, as her gravelly tones are pit against an electric guitar. People magazine considered the track "an instant Toni classic, right up there with 'Breathe Again,' 'Let It Flow' and 'Un-Break My Heart.' The sixth track, the romantic slow jam "Rock Me, Roll Me", was described as "a splendid ode to female desire spotted with plucky violins, subtle reverb and Braxton's distinctive harmonies. The second half of the album slips back into more measured R&B. The seventh track "Selfish" is a "slow ballad" about Braxton's jealousy. The eighth track "Do You Remember When" is the only song produced by Rodney "Darkchild" Jerkins and it harks back to the smooth R&B of Braxton's self-titled debut. The ninth track "Me & My Boyfriend" boasts some Spanish guitar amid its slinky grooves. It features a sample from Tupac Shakur's 1996 cut "Me and My Girlfriend". The tenth track "Tell Me" is a sexy song about performing fantasies for one's love. The eleventh track "And I Love You" is "a requite ballad courtesy of longtime collaborator and mentor Babyface". The twelfth and final track "Always" is a tenderly honed R&B ballad with rich, multi-layered vocals, which add balance to the edgier, street-orientated tracks.

== Promotion ==
Braxton first titled the album Amplified, but changed it to More Than a Woman in post-production to avoid confusion with hip hop artist Q-Tip's solo debut Amplified (1999). The title was ultimately inspired by the Bee Gees song of the same name (1977), which had been prominently played on Braxton's wedding dance with Keri Lewis in April 2001. Scheduled for an October 29 release before being bushed to November 19, 2002, Arista Records originally planned to back the album by a huge promotional plan, including appearances on late-night talk show The Tonight Show, the Macy's Thanksgiving Day Parade, The Wayne Brady Show, Late Night with David Letterman, an NBC Today Show outdoor concert, and the lighting of the Christmas tree at New York City's Rockefeller Center. However, in September 2002, while gearing up for the release of the album, Braxton discovered she was pregnant with her second child and she was subsequently forced to cancel many scheduled performances due to complications.

Executives at the label were reportedly frustrated with the timing of her second pregnancy since the complicated pregnancy confined her to bed rest and thus prevented her from doing the extensive promotion for More Than a Woman. Braxton, being under the impression that Arista Records treated her pregnancy "like a disease", asked to delay the album until 2003, but the label refused. As a result, the promotional campaign in support of the album was often reduced to interviews. In addition to a $675,000 television blitz, Braxton also took part in numerous online promotions with AOL, BET, VH1, Launch.com, MSN, and Oxygen. Arista also intended to work on furthering Braxton's reach with lifestyle marketing in locals as disparate as urban beauty salons and gay clubs. Because of her pregnancy, international publicity for More Than a Woman primarily consisted of a two-day event in Los Angeles in late October 2002.

=== Singles ===
In support of the album, Arista originally planned to release "No More Love," a sample-heavy track produced by and featuring former Murder Inc. Records head Irv Gotti, as the first single from More Than a Woman. However, after Gotti had leaked it to a New York City radio station, Braxton and Arista decided to scrap its release and the song was subsequently excluded from the final track listing. Instead, the Neptunes-produced "Hit the Freeway," a collaboration with Bad Boy rapper Loon, was selected as the album's lead single. The song peaked at number 86 on the US Billboard Hot 100, number 32 on the Hot R&B/Hip-Hop Songs chart, and number two on the Hot Dance Club Play chart.

At one time or another, "Me & My Boyfriend," another song that Gotti contributed to More Than a Woman, was set to be released as the lead single from the album. Initially slated for a September 2002 release, the label decided to release "Hit the Freeway" in October instead. It was consequently selected as the album's second single, however rapper Jay-Z and singer Beyoncé imminently released their single "'03 Bonnie & Clyde," which coincidentally sampled the same beat (as well as lyrical and melodic content) from rapper Tupac Shakur's 1996 song "Me and My Girlfriend", causing Braxton to refrain from releasing her version as a single, and accusing Jay-Z of stealing her idea.

Arista then settled on ballad "A Better Man" instead. Written by Ivan Matias and Andrea Martin, it was sent to urban adult contemporary on December 9, 2002. According to Matias, Braxton refused to shoot a video or support the song as her next single amid controversies surrounding Keri Lewis demanding a piece of the royalties and advance with imposing himself onto the production. Although Lewis earned a vocal production credit on the song and promotional CDs were made available for radio, "A Better Man" was eventually cancelled as a single. Additionally, to service radio shows, a double A-side vinyl for "Give It Back" and "Let Me Show You the Way (Out)" was released.

== Critical reception ==
Professional ratings
Aggregate scores
Source	Rating
Metacritic	77/100
Review scores
Source	Rating
AllMusic	4/5 stars
Blender	4/5 stars
Robert Christgau	(2-star Honorable Mention)
Entertainment Weekly	B
Los Angeles Times	2.5/4 stars
The Rolling Stone Album Guide	3.5/5 stars
Slant Magazine	3.5/5 stars
USA Today	3/4 stars
Yahoo! Music UK	7/10 stars

At Metacritic, which assigns a rated mean out of 100 from mainstream critics, the album received a score of 77, indicating "generally favorable reviews", based on eight reviews. AllMusic editor Stephen Thomas Erlewine awarded it four out of five stars, noting that More Than a Woman was "so consistent" and closely aligned with its predecessor, The Heat, that it can be difficult to distinguish unique characteristics. He added that it "lacks a single as undeniable as "He Wasn't Man Enough," though much of the album maintains a similarly "sexy spirit," ultimately calling it "one of the most satisfying listens of its kind released that year" and "another fine record by Toni Braxton." Blender wrote a positive review, saying that "while her wailing contemporaries go off the rails with exaggeration, Braxton merely tightens her groove and rides these mellow, meaty melodies." Chuck Arnold wrote for People that "her sultry, husky alto shines as she bends and jazzily twists notes with that special Toni touch." Arnold realized that "Although the rest of the album doesn't quite match that quality, it's still easily more than your average R&B-pop fare." Launch.com was positive towards the theme of the songs, writing that "all this anger's not just therapeutic – it also makes her transition to hard hip-hop diva seem sensible, instead of just a marketing move, by grounding it in something real."

Keysha Davis from BBC Music praised Braxton for serving "both middle-of-the-road listeners with her high-powered ballads, as well the comrades of the streets with her attitude-ridden take on modern day living." While discussing the album's hip-hop songs, Chris Willman from Entertainment Weekly wrote that "she has sudden hip-hop pretensions, it's low-key hip-hop, the electronic throbs provides a surprisingly suitable bed for her controlled boudoir cooing." While comparing the album between her previous release The Heat, he called it "hotter than her predominantly adult contemporary previous album" and concluded writing that the album "proves to be the singer's most consistent effort" since her self-titled 1993 debut album. Billboard noted that More Than a Woman "shows Braxton striving to walk a tightrope between [...] two stylistic worlds with unavoidably mixed results. To her credit, she handles the task with more dexterity and finesse than most." USA Today critic Steve Jones found that the album showed a "feistier" side of Braxton, blended in hip-hop flavor, and, with help from collaborators, "showcase[d] Braxton's versatility," proving she was "more than a torch singer." Natalie Nichols from The Los Angeles Times, found that More Than a Woman was featuring "up-to-the-minute production" and a mix of styles, but while musically varied, it ultimately "doesn't completely disguise a lack of real insight." New York Times editor Jon Pareles highlighted Braxton's "bitter specificity" and emotional delivery, but concluded that she "subordinates her voice to too many indifferent tunes," often letting it drift rather than dominate the melodies.

== Commercial performance ==
More Than a Woman debuted and peaked at number 13 on the US Billboard 200, selling 98,000 copies in its first week. It marked Braxton's lowest opening sales for a non-Christmas-themed studio album up to then and was a considerable decline from her previous effort The Heat, which had opened to sales of 199,000 units in 2000. On Billboard's component charts, it reached number five on the Top R&B/Hip-Hop Albums chart, becoming Braxton's first solo album to miss the top spot. In total, More Than a Woman sold 438,000 copies and was eventually certified gold by the Recording Industry Association of America (RIAA) for the shipment of over 500,000 copies in the United States. Elsewhere, More Than a Woman was unable to match the commercial success of Braxton's first three studio albums. While it failed to enter most international music markets, the album reached the top 40 of the German Albums Chart and debuted at number 23 on the Swiss Albums Chart.

Braxton considered More Than a Woman a commercial "flop-flop." Disappointed by its underperformance and the little promotion activities Arista Records had arranged after releasing the first single "Hit the Freeway", Braxton requested her manager Barry Hankerson to obtain a release for her from any future recording obligations to the label. On March 14, 2003, Braxton issued a press statement saying she was leaving Arista for Hankerson's Universal-distributed Blackground Records, on which she released her sixth studio album Libra in 2005. In a 2012 interview with ABC News, Braxton expressed discontentment with the project when asked about the commercial failure of her albums from the mid-to-late 2000s: "Those albums – that's like that one-night stand that you don't want to talk about", she said. "You don't want anyone to know about those records that didn't do well. I had a few of those. Definitely a few."

== Track listing ==
No.	Title	Writer(s)	Producer(s)	Length
1.	"Let Me Show You the Way (Out)"	Toni Braxton; Keri Lewis; Tamar Braxton; Ernest D. Wilson; Curtis Mayfield	No I.D.; Keri^{[a]}	4:19
2.	"Give It Back" (featuring Big Tymers)	Toni Braxton; Tamar Braxton; Bryan Williams; Byron Thomas	Mannie Fresh	3:38
3.	"A Better Man"	Ivan Matias; Andrea Martin; Gerrard C. Baker	Matias; Martin; G. Baker; Keri^{[b]}; Mark Pitts^{[c]}	4:00
4.	"Hit the Freeway" (featuring Loon)	Pharrell Williams; Chauncey Hawkins	The Neptunes	3:49
5.	"Lies, Lies, Lies"	Lewis; Stokley	Keri	5:10
6.	"Rock Me, Roll Me"	Toni Braxton; Lewis; Tamar Braxton	Keri	4:57
7.	"Selfish"	Toni Braxton; Robert Smith; Kenisha Pratt; Brandy Smith; Tamar Braxton; Blake English	Robert "Big Bert" Smith	3:47
8.	"Do You Remember When"	Toni Braxton; Rodney Jerkins; Fred Jerkins III; LaShawn Daniels	Rodney "Darkchild" Jerkins	4:03
9.	"Me & My Boyfriend"	Toni Braxton; Tamar Braxton; Andre Parker; Irving Lorenzo; Tupac Shakur; Tyrone Wrice; Ricky Rouse; Darryl Harper	Chink Santana; Irv Gotti	3:44
10.	"Tell Me"	Toni Braxton; Lewis; Anthony Bias; Anita Baker; Louis Johnson	Keri	4:10
11.	"And I Love You"	Babyface; Daryl Simmons	Babyface	4:02
12.	"Always"	Toni Braxton; R. Smith; Tamar Braxton; Pratt; B. Smith; English	R. Smith	4:29

=== Notes ===
- ^{^[a]} signifies a co-producer
- ^{^[b]} signifies a vocal producer
- ^{^[c]} signifies an additional producer

=== Sample credits ===
- "Let Me Show You the Way (Out)" contains excerpts from "Love's Happening", written by Curtis Mayfield.
- "Me & My Boyfriend" contains excerpts from "Me and My Girlfriend", written by Tupac Shakur, Tyrone Wrice, Ricky Rouse, and Darryl Harper.
- "Tell Me" contains interpolations from the composition "Sweet Love", written by Anthony Bias, Anita Baker, and Louis Johnson.

== Personnel ==
Credits adapted from the liner notes of More Than a Woman.

=== Musicians ===
- Toni Braxton – vocals, background vocals (all tracks)
- No I.D. – all instruments, programming (track 1)
- Keri – arrangement (tracks 1, 5, 10); drum programming, keyboards (tracks 5, 6, 10); Rhodes, guitar (track 5)
- Tamar Braxton – background vocals (all tracks)
- Terrence "Bearwolf" Williams – keyboards (track 2)
- Baby – rap vocals (track 2)
- Mannie Fresh – rap vocals (track 2)
- Andrea Martin – arrangement, background vocals (track 3)
- Ivan Matias – arrangement (track 3)
- Gerrard C. Baker – all instruments, programming (track 3)
- Pharrell Williams – instruments, instrument arrangements, additional vocals (track 4)
- Chad Hugo – instruments, instrument arrangements, additional vocals (track 4)
- Loon – rap vocals (track 4)
- Chris "Daddy" Dave – drums (track 5)
- Keith Lewis – guitar (track 5)
- O'Dell – guitar (track 5)
- Stokley – acoustic guitar, solo guitar, background vocals (track 5)
- Ricky Kinchen – bass (track 5)
- Blake English – guitar (tracks 7, 12)
- Rodney "Darkchild" Jerkins – all music (track 8)
- Tomi Martin – guitar (track 8)
- Jeremy Lubbock – string arrangements (track 8)
- Ricky Rouse – guitar (track 9)
- Babyface – drum programming, keyboards, bass (track 11)
- Clare Fischer – orchestra arrangements, orchestra conducting (track 12)
- Robert "Big Bert" Smith – keyboards (track 12)
- Brent Fischer – orchestra arrangements, orchestra conducting (track 6); orchestra project coordinator, orchestra management
- Assa Drori – violin
- Amy Hershberger – violin
- Joe Ketendjian – violin
- Armen Garabedian – violin
- Pat Aiken – violin
- Sally Berman – violin
- Brian Benning – violin
- Irma Neumann – violin
- Agnes Gottschewski – violin
- Phillip Levy – violin
- Rebecca Bunnell – violin
- Johana Krejci – violin
- Henry Gronnier – violin
- Dennis Molchan – violin
- Miwako Watanabe – violin
- Julie Rogers – violin
- Kazi Pitelka – viola
- Jorge Moraga – viola
- Carole Kleister-Castillo – viola
- Thomas Diener – viola
- Renita Koven – viola
- Lynn Grants – viola
- Cecilia Tasn – cello
- Maurice Grants – cello
- Dan Smith – cello
- Earl Madison – cello
- Oscar Hidalgo – contrabass
- Drew Dembowski – contrabass

=== Technical ===
- No I.D. – production (track 1)
- Keri – co-production, Pro Tools editing (track 1); recording (tracks 1–3, 5, 6, 10); vocal production (track 3); production (tracks 5, 6, 10); mixing (tracks 5, 6); executive production
- Kevin "KD" Davis – mixing (tracks 1, 6, 10)
- Dion Peters – mixing assistance (track 1)
- Mannie Fresh – production (track 2)
- Mark "DJ Exit" Goodchild – recording (track 2)
- Leslie Brathwaite – mixing (track 2)
- Ivan Matias – production (track 3)
- Andrea Martin – production (track 3)
- Gerrard C. Baker – production (track 3)
- Mark Pitts – additional production (track 3)
- Victor Mancusi – recording, mixing (track 3)
- Rene Antelmann – mixing assistance (track 3)
- Kirk Lightburn – song coordination (track 3)
- The Neptunes – production (track 4)
- Andrew "Drew" Coleman – recording (track 4)
- Frannie Graham – recording assistance (track 4)
- Cedric Anderson – recording assistance (track 4)
- Phil Tan – mixing (track 4)
- John Horesco IV – mixing assistance (track 4)
- Steve Hodge – mixing (track 5)
- Larry Mah – string recording (track 6)
- Stephen Glicken – mixing assistance (tracks 6, 12)
- Robert "Big Bert" Smith – production (tracks 7, 12)
- Blake English – recording, mixing (tracks 7, 12)
- Paul Foley – recording (tracks 7, 12)
- Yen-Hue Tan – recording assistance (tracks 7, 12)
- Spencer Swanson – recording assistance (tracks 7, 12)
- Mike Houge – recording assistance (tracks 7, 12)
- Brett Liebermann – mixing assistance (track 7)
- Rodney "Darkchild" Jerkins – production, mixing (track 8)
- Fabian Marasciullo – recording (track 8)
- Dexter Simmons – mixing (track 8)
- John Kurlander – string recording (track 8)
- Chink Santana – production (track 9)
- Irv Gotti – production (track 9)
- Brian Springer – recording, mixing (track 9)
- Babyface – production (track 11)
- Paul Boutin – recording (track 11)
- Edward Quesada – recording assistance (track 11)
- Craig Taylor – recording assistance (track 11)
- Serban Ghenea – mixing (track 11)
- Tim Roberts – mixing assistance (track 11)
- John Hanes – additional Pro Tools engineering (track 11)
- Ivy Skoff – production coordination (track 11)
- Jean-Marie Horvat – recording (track 12)
- Brent Fischer – orchestra management, orchestra project coordination
- Assa Drori – orchestra management
- Toni Braxton – executive production
- Antonio "L.A." Reid – executive production
- Herb Powers Jr. – mastering
- Allen D. Hong – project coordination
- Evelyn Beauman – project assistance

=== Artwork ===
- Richard Thomas Jennings – art direction
- Tony Duran – cover and matching interior photo
- Daniela Federici – inside photo

== Charts ==
=== Weekly charts ===
Weekly chart performance for More Than a Woman
Chart (2002)	Peak position
Canadian Albums (Nielsen SoundScan)	66
Canadian R&B Albums (Nielsen SoundScan)	19
Dutch Albums (Album Top 100)	88
European Albums (Music & Media)	88
French Albums (SNEP)	90
German Albums (Offizielle Top 100)	37
Japanese Albums (Oricon)	114
Swiss Albums (Schweizer Hitparade)	23
UK Albums (OCC)	123
UK R&B Albums (OCC)	20
US Billboard 200	13
US Top R&B/Hip-Hop Albums (Billboard)	5

=== Year-end charts ===
2002 year-end chart performance for More Than a Woman
Chart (2002)	Position
Canadian R&B Albums (Nielsen SoundScan)	134

2003 year-end chart performance for More Than a Woman
Chart (2003)	Position
US Billboard 200	194
US Top R&B/Hip-Hop Albums (Billboard)	60

== Certifications ==
Certifications for More Than a Woman
Region	Certification	Certified units/sales
United States (RIAA)	Gold	500,000^{^}
^{^} Shipments figures based on certification alone.

== Release history ==
Release history for More Than a Woman
Region	Date	Label	Ref.
Germany	November 18, 2002	BMG	
United Kingdom	November 18, 2002	LaFace	
United States	November 19, 2002	Arista	
Japan	November 27, 2002	BMG	
