= Klarmann/Weber =

German songwriters and record producers

Klarmann/Weber is a German songwriting and record production duo, consisting of Irmgard Klarmann and Felix Weber.

The duo have composed and produced music since the late 1970s. In the 1980s, Klarmann/Weber established their name in Germany and internationally as successful songwriters. In the 90's Klarmann and Weber focused on working more with UK and US based artists and songwriters, which eventually led Felix Weber to relocate to the US. Klarmann/Weber is now writing and performing their songs in their own music studios in Germany and the US.

Klarmann/Weber's songs gained international recognition with artists such as Chaka Khan, Randy Crawford, Paul Anka, Nancy Wilson, La Toya Jackson, Toni Braxton (The Braxtons "Good Life"), Tracie Spencer and La Bouche.
