= Give U My Heart =

Single by Babyface featuring Toni Braxton

from the album Boomerang: Original Soundtrack Album
- Released: July 7, 1992
- Recorded: May 1992
- Studio: Summa Music Group (Los Angeles, CA); Doppler Studios (Atlanta, GA)
- Genre: R&B; new jack swing
- Length: 5:02
- Label: LaFace
- Songwriters: Babyface; L.A. Reid; Daryl Simmons; Boaz Watson
- Producers: L.A. Reid; Babyface; Daryl Simmons

Babyface singles chronology
"Love Makes Things Happen" (1990)	"Give U My Heart" (1992)	"For the Cool in You" (1993)

Toni Braxton singles chronology
"Give U My Heart" (1992)	"Love Shoulda Brought You Home" (1992)

Music video
- Give U My Heart" on YouTube

"Give U My Heart" is a song recorded by American R&B singers Babyface and Toni Braxton for the soundtrack to the 1992 film Boomerang, starring Eddie Murphy. The collaboration was released as a single the same year, reaching No. 29 on the US Billboard Hot 100 and No. 2 on the Billboard Hot R&B Singles chart (behind another song from the Boomerang soundtrack, Boyz II Men's "End of the Road").

The song can be found on two of Braxton's greatest-hits albums, 2003's Ultimate Toni Braxton and 2007's The Essential Toni Braxton, and as a B-side on some editions of her 1993 single "Another Sad Love Song".

The "Upscale R&B Remix" version is played during the end credits of Boomerang.

== Critical reception ==
Dennis Hunt from Los Angeles Times described the song as a "sultry" duet.

== Track listings and formats ==
- US 12" vinyl single

A1. "Give U My Heart" (Extended Remix) – 6:55
A2. "Give U My Heart" (Album Version) (Pumped Up) – 4:59
A3. "Give U My Heart" (Instrumental) – 5:00
B1. "Give U My Heart" (Remix Radio Edit) – 4:15
B2. "Give U My Heart" (Mad Ball Mix) – 4:10
B3. "Give U My Heart" (Smooth & Wet Remix) – 4:15
B4. "Give U My Heart" (Upscale R&B Remix) – 4:42

- Netherlands 12" vinyl single

A1. "Give U My Heart" (Remix Radio Edit) – 4:15
A2. "Give U My Heart" (Mad Ball Mix) – 4:10
B1. "Give U My Heart" (Album Radio Edit) – 4:05
B2. "Give U My Heart" (Extended Remix) – 6:55

- EU CD single
1. "Give U My Heart" (Album Radio Edit) – 4:05
2. "Give U My Heart" (Mad Ball Mix) – 6:12
3. "Give U My Heart" (Instrumental) – 5:00
4. "Give U My Heart" (Extended Remix) – 6:55

== Credits and personnel ==
Credits from Single liner notes

- Steve Hall – mastering
- Babyface – vocals
- Toni Braxton – vocals
- Babyface – producer, writer
- Vance Taylor – piano
- Bo Watson – synthesizer
- Debra Killings – backing vocals
- L.A. Reid – producer, writer
- Babyface – keyboards
- Daryl Simmons – producer, writer
- Vincent Herbert – remix, producer
- Bo Watson – writer
- L.A. Reid – drum programming, mixing
- Brad Gilderman – mixing, engineer

== Charts ==
=== Weekly charts ===
Chart (1992)	Peak position
Australia (ARIA)	110
US Billboard Hot 100	29
US Hot R&B/Hip-Hop Songs (Billboard)	2
US Rhythmic Airplay (Billboard)	32
US Top 100 Pop Singles (Cash Box)	24

=== Year-end charts ===
Chart (1992)	Position
US Hot R&B/Hip-Hop Songs (Billboard)	58
