= Good Life (The Braxtons song) =

Single by The Braxtons

from the album The Essential Toni Braxton
- B-side: "Family"
- Released: August 1990
- Genre: R&B
- Label: Arista
- Songwriters: Irmgard Klarmann; Felix Weber

The Braxtons singles chronology
"Good Life" (1990)	"So Many Ways" (1996)

"Good Life" is a 1990 single by The Braxtons, featuring Toni Braxton and her four younger sisters: Traci, Towanda, Trina, and Tamar. "Good Life", written by the German songwriting/production team Klarmann/Weber, was Toni Braxton's first professional recording, and was released as part of Toni Braxton's third compilation album The Essential Toni Braxton (2007).

Toni Braxton and her sisters signed with Arista Records as The Braxtons in 1989. In 1990, they released "Good Life", their first and only single as a fivesome. The single, backed with "Family" as a B-side, reached #79 on the Billboard Hot Black Single charts. The song wasn't a major hit but it caught the attention of the songwriting/production team of L.A. Reid and Babyface, who had just formed their own label, LaFace Records (associated with Arista). Toni Braxton was signed with LaFace as a solo artist.

The Braxtons disbanded as a foursome but would later reunite as a threesome in 1996, when Trina, Tamar, and Towanda released So Many Ways on Atlantic Records. Traci was not signed because she was pregnant at the time. The Braxtons disbanded for good when Tamar left the group for a solo record deal.

"Good Life" is featured on The Essential Toni Braxton.
