= Breathe Again =

1993 single by Toni Braxton

Single by Toni Braxton

from the album Toni Braxton
- Released: October 6, 1993
- Studio: LaCoCo, Doppler (Atlanta, Georgia)
- Genre: R&B
- Length: 4:29 (album version); 4:15 (radio edit)
- Label: LaFace
- Songwriter: Kenneth "Babyface" Edmonds
- Producers: Babyface; Daryl Simmons; L.A. Reid

Toni Braxton singles chronology
"Another Sad Love Song" (1993)	"Breathe Again" (1993)	"Seven Whole Days" (1993)

Music video
- "Breathe Again" on YouTube

"Breathe Again" is a song by American R&B singer Toni Braxton. It was written by Kenneth "Babyface" Edmonds and produced by Edmonds, L.A. Reid, and Daryl Simmons for Braxton's eponymous debut album (1993). Its lyrics evokes a sense of nostalgia from a relationship that has run its course. The ballad was released as the album's second single on October 6, 1993, by LaFace and Arista Records. It received mostly positive reviews from music critics, with Braxton's vocal performance praised.

The single peaked at number three on the US Billboard Hot 100 and reached number four on the Billboard Hot R&B Singles and Adult Contemporary charts. "Breathe Again" became one of Braxton's most successful international hits, reaching number two in Australia, New Zealand, and the United Kingdom and peaking within the top 10 in Canada and several European countries. Its accompanying music video was directed by Randee St. Nicholas and filmed in England, featuring Braxton running through a hedge maze in a 17th-century dress. It won an award at the 1994 Billboard Music Video Awards and the song earned Braxton her second consecutive Grammy Award for Best Female R&B Vocal Performance in 1995.

"Breathe Again" was included in all of the greatest hits collections released by Braxton, including Ultimate Toni Braxton (2003), Platinum & Gold Collection (2004), The Essential Toni Braxton (2007), Playlist: The Very Best of Toni Braxton (2008) and Breathe Again: The Best of Toni Braxton (2009).

== Background and composition ==
After the success of the previous single, "Another Sad Love Song", "Breathe Again" was released as the second official single from Toni Braxton's self-titled album, on October 6, 1993. "Breathe Again" was written and produced by Kenneth "Babyface" Edmonds, with co-production being handled by Daryl Simmons and L.A. Reid. Lyrically, in "Breathe Again", Braxton would crumble and have a nervous breakdown if her boyfriend were to break up with her, singing, "If I never feel you in my arms again/If I never feel your tender kiss again/If I never hear I love you now and then/Will I never make love to you once again/Please understand/If love ends/Then I promise you, I promise you, that/That I shall never breathe again."

== Critical reception ==
"Breathe Again" received mostly positive reviews from music critics. Ron Wynn of AllMusic named the song a highlight from the album, writing that "Braxton's husky, enticing voice sounds hypnotic on the track." According to Daryl Easlea of BBC Music, the song "fully established Braxton," calling it "a delicate ballad that refused to resort wholly to cliché, it is brought to life by Braxton’s dreamy, breathy delivery." Larry Flick from Billboard magazine described it as "a yearning, R&B-framed ballad." He said, "Once again, her vocal is expressive and moving—mostly due to an unusual willingness to let some rough-edged notes mingle with the sweet diva-like tones. Braxton's earthy personality makes her seem more accessible than a lot of other chest-pounding singers." Mitchell May of Chicago Tribune was also positive, writing that "the way her voice throbs when she sings, I can't stop thinking about you, conveys a sense of despair and longing that is rare."

John Martinucci from the Gavin Report viewed it as "melancholy". Alan Jones from Music Week complimented it as "pretty and radio friendly", adding that "this seems sure to launch Braxton here [in the UK], though it will struggle to repeat its Top 10 placing." Maria Jimenez from Music & Media wrote, "A voice not easily forgotten." The magazine also considered it "a similar tune" to "Another Sad Love Song". A reviewer from People magazine called the song "haunting", writing that "the quaver in her voice says more about love's promise and deceit than many singers manage in a career." John McAlley from Rolling Stone named it "the album's best material", concluding that "Braxton's love hangover has reached ludicrously epic proportions." Charles Aaron from Spin felt "this Babyface ballad-under-glass invokes heartache more than heartbreak". He added that "Braxton's fitful vocal flourishes dazzle (and less obviously than on 'Love Shoulda Brought You Home')."

Steve Pick from St. Louis Post-Dispatch wrote, "Here's another sad love song from a sultry alto singer who seems to be getting the best of the LaFace production team's work this year. This pretty tune benefits greatly from Braxton's ability to hint at the over-the-top histrionics she never quite falls into. As a result, it's both smooth and edgy." James Hunter from Vibe said that Babyface's writing on "Breathe Again" "gives the deserving future star melodic peaks and valleys to explore with her gorgeously detailed, unconceited voice." Mike Joyce from The Washington Post felt the song "[has] a poignancy".

== Chart performance ==
"Breathe Again" was Braxton's first worldwide hit. In the United States, the song was a success, reaching number three for three non-consecutive weeks on the Billboard Hot 100. It spent 17 weeks in the top 10. On the Cash Box Top 100, it peaked at number two. On the Billboard component charts, "Breathe Again" also reached high positions, peaking at number two on the Top 40/Mainstream chart and number four on both the Adult Contemporary and Hot R&B Singles charts. It sold 500,000 copies domestically, earning a gold certification from the Recording Industry Association of America. In the United Kingdom, "Breathe Again" debuted and peaked at number two on January 15, 1994, becoming her best-charting single in the UK along with "Un-Break My Heart".

In Australia, the song debuted at number 47 on the ARIA Singles Chart on March 20, 1994, and reached number two on May 1, 1994, remaining at the same position for two further weeks. It spent 17 weeks on the ARIA Singles Chart and ranked at number 20 on ARIA's year-end chart for 1994. In New Zealand, the song debuted at number 20 on the RIANZ Singles Chart chart on December 12, 1993. In its eighth week, the song climbed to number two, its peak position. It spent four non-consecutive weeks at the position and 21 weeks on the RIANZ chart, becoming Braxton's best-performing single in New Zealand. The song earned a Grammy Award for Best Female R&B Vocal Performance in 1995, becoming Braxton's second consecutive Grammy Award in the same category.

== Music video ==
Braxton in the video, wearing a "17th-century" dress, running through a hedge maze.

The music video for "Breathe Again" was directed by Randee St. Nicholas. It was filmed at Longleat House in Wiltshire, England and is set in black-and-white format. It features Braxton running through a hedge maze while being searched for by her love interest, played by American model Tyson Beckford. The video won an award for Best Clip of the Year in the category for R&B/Urban at the 1994 Billboard Music Video Awards. On her DVD, From Toni with Love... The Video Collection, two other versions of the video are also featured: the "European version" and the "Spanish version".

On the same DVD, Braxton commented about the video, saying, "This video was originally filmed in color and Randee St. Nicholas, the director, didn't like the maze part, she said it looked like piles of dirt, instead of these beautiful green [...], she said it looked like chunks of rock, so she put it in black and white." About her look, she said, "I remember my stylist was going crazy, trying to find a 17th-century dress, and my hair was short, and I didn't want to wear wigs and my stylist put these little extensions in my hair and It was so cold and the dress was so heavy."

== Awards and nominations ==
1994 Billboard Music Video Awards

- Best R&B/Urban Clip of the Year – "Breathe Again" by Toni Braxton (won)

1995 International Dance Awards

- Tune of the Year – "Breathe Again" by Toni Braxton (nominated)

1995 Grammy Awards

- Best Female R&B Vocal Performance – "Breathe Again" by Toni Braxton (won)

== Track listings and formats ==
- US CD single
1. "Breathe Again" (radio edit)
2. "Breathe Again" (extended mix)
3. "Breathe Again" (Breathless mix)
4. "Breathe Again" (club mix)
5. "Breathe Again" (Spanish version)
- UK and German CD single
1. "Breathe Again" (radio edit)
2. "Breathe Again" (D'Jeep mix)
3. "Breathe Again" (extended club mix)
4. "Breathe Again" (D'Moody mix)
5. "Breathe Again" (Breathless mix)
6. "Breathe Again" (Spanish version)
- Spanish CD single
1. "Breathe Again" (versión en Castellano)
2. "Another Sad Love Song" (album version)

== Charts ==
=== Weekly charts ===
Chart (1993–1994)	Peak position
Australia (ARIA)	2
Belgium (Ultratop 50 Flanders)	13
Canada Top Singles (RPM)	7
Canada Adult Contemporary (RPM)	2
Canada Contemporary Hit Radio (The Record)	2
El Salvador (El Siglo de Torreón)	2
Europe (Eurochart Hot 100)	8
Europe (European AC Radio)	3
Europe (European Hit Radio)	6
Germany (GfK)	52
Iceland (Íslenski Listinn Topp 40)	34
Ireland (IRMA)	10
Israel (Israeli Singles Chart)	28
Netherlands (Dutch Top 40)	7
Netherlands (Single Top 100)	7
New Zealand (Recorded Music NZ)	2
Norway (VG-lista)	7
Scottish Singles Sales (Official Charts)	12
Sweden (Sverigetopplistan)	25
UK Singles (Official Charts)	2
UK Airplay (Music Week)	1
UK Dance (Music Week)	7
UK Club Chart (Music Week)	57
US Billboard Hot 100	3
US Adult Contemporary (Billboard)	4
US Dance Singles Sales (Billboard)	7
US Hot R&B/Hip-Hop Songs (Billboard)	4
US Pop Airplay (Billboard)	2
US Rhythmic Airplay (Billboard)	4
US Cash Box Top 100	2
Zimbabwe (ZIMA)	1

=== Year-end charts ===
Chart (1993)	Position
US Hot R&B Singles (Billboard)	83

Chart (1994)	Position
Australia (ARIA)	20
Belgium (Ultratop)	86
Brazil (Brazilian Radio Airplay)	1
Canada Top Singles (RPM)	54
Canada Adult Contemporary (RPM)	8
Europe (Eurochart Hot 100)	54
Europe (European Hit Radio)	32
Netherlands (Dutch Top 40)	52
Netherlands (Single Top 100)	64
New Zealand (RIANZ)	20
UK Singles (OCC)	33
UK Airplay (Music Week)	11
US Billboard Hot 100	7
US Adult Contemporary (Billboard)	8
US Hot R&B Singles (Billboard)	27
US Cash Box Top 100	8

== Certifications ==
Region	Certification	Certified units/sales
Australia (ARIA)	Platinum	70,000^{^}
New Zealand (RMNZ) Physical sales	Platinum	10,000^{*}
New Zealand (RMNZ) Digital sales + streaming	Gold	15,000^{‡}
United Kingdom (BPI)	Silver	200,000^{^}
United States (RIAA)	Gold	500,000^{^}
^{*} Sales figures based on certification alone.^{^} Shipments figures based on certification alone.^{‡} Sales+streaming figures based on certification alone.

== Release history ==
Region	Date	Format(s)	Label(s)	Ref.
United States	October 6, 1993	12-inch vinyl; CD; cassette	LaFace	
Japan	December 16, 1993	Mini-CD	LaFace; Arista	
United Kingdom	January 4, 1994	7-inch vinyl; 12-inch vinyl; CD; cassette	LaFace; Arista	
Sweden	January 17, 1994	CD	LaFace; Arista	
Australia	February 28, 1994	12-inch vinyl; CD; cassette	LaFace	

== Cover versions ==
- In 1996, contemporary jazz guitarist Chuck Loeb presented his version from the album The Music Inside.
- In 2002, Jazz trumpeter Greg Adams covered the song on his album "Midnight Morning".
- In 2004, Sweet Tea covered the song on the compilation album Reggae Gold 1994.
- In 2006, R&B singer Margot B. covered the song on her album Margot B. Inspired.
