= Boomerang (soundtrack) =

Boomerang: Original Soundtrack Album

Soundtrack album by various artists
- Released: June 30, 1992
- Recorded: March–May 1992
- Genres: R&B; new jack swing; hip hop; soul
- Length: 55:24
- Label: LaFace
- Producers: Dallas Austin; Babyface; P.M. Dawn; L.A. Reid; Shavoni and Buster; A Tribe Called Quest; Kenny Vaughan

Singles from Boomerang: Original Soundtrack Album
- 1. "Give U My Heart" Released: June 15, 1992; 2. "End of the Road" Released: July 14, 1992; 3. "I'd Die Without You" Released: October 9, 1992; 4. "Love Shoulda Brought You Home" Released: December 4, 1992; 5. "7 Day Weekend" Released: 1992; 6. "Hot Sex" Released: 1992

Professional ratings
Review scores
Source	Rating
AllMusic	3/5 stars
Entertainment Weekly	A
Los Angeles Times	3/4 stars

Boomerang: Original Soundtrack Album is the soundtrack to Reginald Hudlin's 1992 film Boomerang. It was released on June 30, 1992, by LaFace Records. The album peaked at number four on the US Billboard 200 and reached the top spot on the Top R&B/Hip-Hop Albums chart. The album was certified gold by the Recording Industry Association of America (RIAA) in August 1992 and eventually reached triple-platinum status by April 1995.

== Track listing ==
No.	Title	Writer(s)	Producer(s)	Length
1.	"Give U My Heart" (performed by Babyface featuring Toni Braxton)	Bo Watson; Babyface; L.A. Reid; Daryl Simmons	L.A. Reid; Babyface; Simmons^{[a]}	5:01
2.	"It's Gonna Be Alright" (performed by Aaron Hall featuring Charlie Wilson)	Scott Parker; Louis Brown; Wilson	Shavoni and Buster	5:34
3.	"Tonight Is Right" (performed by Keith Washington)	Babyface; Reid; Simmons	Reid; Babyface; Simmons^{[a]}	4:28
4.	"I'd Die Without You" (performed by P.M. Dawn)	Attrell Cordes	P.M. Dawn	4:11
5.	"7 Day Weekend" (performed by Grace Jones)	Jones; Dallas Austin; Satch	Austin; Randy Ran^{[a]}	4:56
6.	"End of the Road" (performed by Boyz II Men)	Babyface; Reid; Simmons	Reid; Babyface; Simmons^{[a]}	5:48
7.	"Reversal of a Dog" (performed by Damian Dame, Highland Place Mobsters, TLC and Toni Braxton)	Reid; Babyface; Simmons; Lisa Lopes; Melvin Davis	Reid; Babyface	5:45
8.	"Love Shoulda Brought You Home" (performed by Toni Braxton)	Watson; Babyface; Simmons	Reid; Babyface; Simmons^{[a]}	4:56
9.	"There U Go" (performed by Johnny Gill)	Babyface; Reid; Simmons	Reid; Babyface; Simmons^{[a]}	5:16
10.	"Don't Wanna Love You" (performed by Shanice)	Babyface; Reid; Simmons	Reid; Babyface; Simmons^{[a]}	4:32
11.	"Feels Like Heaven" (performed by Kenny Vaughan and The Art of Love)	Vaughan	Vaughan	2:04
12.	"Hot Sex" (performed by A Tribe Called Quest)	Ali Shaheed Muhammad; Jonathan Davis; Malik Taylor	A Tribe Called Quest	2:45
Total length:				55:24

=== Notes ===
- ^{^[a]} signifies a co-producer

== Personnel ==
Information taken from AllMusic.

- Bass – Kayo, Debra Killings
- Coordination – Constance Armstrong, Sharliss Ashbury
- Drums – L.A. Reid
- Executive production – L.A. Reid
- Keyboards – Babyface, Bo Watson
- Mastering – Chris Gehringer
- Music supervision – Bill Stephney
- Percussion – L.A. Reid
- Performer – Babyface, Boyz II Men, Toni Braxton, Damian Dame, Johnny Gill, Aaron Hall, Highland Place Mobsters, Grace Jones, P.M. Dawn, Shanice, TLC, A Tribe Called Quest, Keith Washington, Charlie Wilson
- Piano – Jim Lunarci, Vance Taylor
- Production – Dallas Austin, Babyface, Buster, P.M. Dawn, Randy Ran, L.A. Reid, Shavoni, Daryl Simmons, A Tribe Called Quest, Kenny Vaughan
- Technical assistance – Donald Parks
- Vocals – Babyface, Boo Boo, Boyz II Men, Toni Braxton, Damian Dame, Johnny Gill, Aaron Hall, Grace Jones, LaFace Cartel, Lisa "Left Eye" Lopes, P.M. Dawn, Shanice, T-Boz, A Tribe Called Quest, Kenny Vaughan, Keith Washington
- Background vocals – Babyface, Toni Braxton, Deah Dame, Kevon Edmonds, Melvin Edmonds, Debra Killings, Maniac, Keith Michell, Tye-V, Charlie Wilson

== Charts ==
=== Weekly charts ===
Weekly chart performance for Boomerang: Original Soundtrack Album
Chart (1992)	Peak position
Australian Albums (ARIA)	29
Dutch Albums (Album Top 100)	58
German Albums (Offizielle Top 100)	54
Hungarian Albums (MAHASZ)	34
New Zealand Albums (RMNZ)	22
US Billboard 200	4
US Top R&B/Hip-Hop Albums (Billboard)	1

=== Year-end charts ===
1992 year-end chart performance for Boomerang: Original Soundtrack Album
Chart (1992)	Position
US Billboard 200	39
US Top R&B/Hip-Hop Albums (Billboard)	20

1993 year-end chart performance for Boomerang: Original Soundtrack Album
Chart (1993)	Position
US Billboard 200	66
US Top R&B/Hip-Hop Albums (Billboard)	27

== Certifications ==
Certifications for Boomerang: Original Soundtrack Album
Region	Certification	Certified units/sales
Canada (Music Canada)	Gold	50,000^{^}
United States (RIAA)	3× Platinum	3,000,000^{^}
^{^} Shipments figures based on certification alone.

== See also ==
- List of Billboard number-one R&B albums of 1992
