= Love Shoulda Brought You Home =

Single by Toni Braxton

from the album Boomerang: Original Soundtrack Album and Toni Braxton
- Released: September 28, 1992
- Genre: R&B
- Length: 4:56
- Label: LaFace
- Songwriters: Kenneth "Babyface" Edmonds; Daryl Simmons; Bo Watson
- Producers: L.A. Reid; Kenneth "Babyface" Edmonds; Daryl Simmons

Toni Braxton singles chronology
"Give U My Heart" (1992)	"Love Shoulda Brought You Home" (1992)	"Another Sad Love Song" (1993)

Music video
- "Love Shoulda Brought You Home" on YouTube

"Love Shoulda Brought You Home" is the debut solo single by American singer Toni Braxton. It was written by Kenneth "Babyface" Edmonds, Daryl Simmons, and Bo Watson and produced by Edmonds and Simmons along with L.A. Reid. Originally written for singer Anita Baker, who had to decline due to her pregnancy, it was eventually recorded by Braxton and featured on the soundtrack to Reginald Hudlin's romantic comedy film Boomerang (1992). The song was later also included on Braxton's self titled debut album (1993). Lyrically, the slow-groove R&B song is saga of betrayal and infidelity that depicts a heartbroken Braxton.

The song was one out of several songs from the Boomerang soundtrack that were issued as a single by LaFace Records. Released in October 1992, "Love Shoulda Brought You Home" became Braxton's second consecutive top 40 hit on the US Billboard Hot 100, following "Give U My Heart," her duet with Babyface, charting at number thirty-three. It also reached the top five on Billboard's Hot R&B/Hip-Hop Songs, peaking at number four, and entered the top 40 of the UK Singles Chart. An accompanying music video for "Love Shoulda Brought You Home" was directed by Ralph Ziman.

== Background and release ==
"Love Shoulda Brought You Home" was written by Kenneth "Babyface" Edmonds, Daryl Simmons, and Bo Watson, and originally to be recorded by Anita Baker. Production on the track was overseen by Edmonds and Simmons along with L.A. Reid, while mixing was handled by Reid and Barney Perkins. Background vocals were provided by Braxton, Edmonds, Debra Killings, and Trina Broussard, with Watson playing keyboards and Vance Taylor playing acoustic piano. Reid and Edmonds also served as executive producers on "Love Shoulda Brought You Home".

The song served as the follow-up to Braxton's duet with Babyface, titled "Give U My Heart", her debut as a solo singer, which was also included on the soundtrack of Eddie Murphy's film, Boomerang (1992). Both songs "Give U My Heart" and "Love Shoulda Brought You Home" were originally to be recorded by Baker, but due to Baker's pregnancy, she had to decline. The title of the song is a direct line from Boomerang. In the film, Halle Berry's character, Angela Lewis, angrily tells her man, Marcus Graham, played by Murphy, after he spent the night with another woman, "Love should've brought your ass home last night."

== Critical reception ==
Marisa Fox from Entertainment Weekly said that "Love Shoulda Brought You Home" "is a bit too much of an Anita Baker 'Real Love' clone". James Hamilton from Music Week's RM Dance Update described the song as a "pleasant rolling 87.8bpm sultry swayer" in his weekly dance column.

== Commercial performance ==
In the United States, "Love Shoulda Brought You Home" peaked number five on the Billboard's Hot R&B Singles chart on December 5, 1992. The song spent a total of twenty nine weeks on the chart. A months later, on January 16, 1993, it peaked at number nineteen on Billboard's Rhythmic Songs chart and number thirty-three on the Billboard Hot 100 chart. "Love Shoulda Brought You Home" also peaked at number thirty six on the Radio Songs chart.

In the United Kingdom, on November 27, 1994, "Love Shoulda Brought You Home" debuted at number thirty three on the UK Singles Chart. In its second and third week the song fell to numbers forty six and seventy five. On January 14, 1995, the song re-entered the UK Singles Chart, charting at number ninety three before falling out the top 100.

== Music video ==
The music video for "Love Shoulda Brought You Home", directed by Ralph Ziman, shows an angry Braxton—alternating between a long sweater, worn as a dress, and a suit complete with tie. She is fed up with her boyfriend and testifies that if he really cared, then love should have brought him home last night.

== Track listing and formats ==
- US CD single
1. "Love Shoulda Brought You Home" (Radio Edit) – 4:16
2. "Love Shoulda Brought You Home" (Album Version) – 4:56
3. "Love Shoulda Brought You Home" (Slow Sensual Mix) – 3:33
- UK CD single
1. "Love Shoulda Brought You Home" (Radio Edit) – 4:16
2. "How Many Ways" (R. Kelly Radio Edit) – 4:02
3. "How Many Ways" (Radio Edit Album Version) – 4:20
4. "The Christmas Song" – 3:25
- UK 7" Vinyl single

A. "Love Shoulda Brought You Home" – 4:16
B. "How Many Ways" (R. Kelly Radio Edit) – 4:02

- US Cassette single

A1. "Love Shoulda Brought You Home" (Album Version) – 4:55
A2. "Love Shoulda Brought You Home" (Slow Sensual Mix) – 3:33
B1. "Love Shoulda Brought You Home" (Album Version) – 4:55
B2. "Love Shoulda Brought You Home" (Slow Sensual Mix) – 3:33

== Credits and personnel ==
Credits lifted from the single's liner notes.

- Carlton Batts – mastering
- Toni Braxton – vocals
- Vance Taylor - acoustic piano
- Fil Brown – recording engineering
- Milton Chan – mixing engineering
- Babyface – production, writing
- L.A. Reid – mixing, production
- Steve Schwartzberg – recording engineering
- Daryl Simmons – production, writing
- Bo Watson – writing
- Matt Westfield – recording engineering
- Sean Young – recording engineering
- Jim Zumpano – recording engineering
- Barney Perkins – engineering

== Charts ==
=== Weekly charts ===
Chart (1992–1994)	Peak position
Iceland (Íslenski Listinn Topp 40)	36
Scottish Singles Sales (Official Charts)	69
UK Singles (Official Charts)	33
UK Hip Hop/R&B (Official Charts)	4
UK Airplay (Music Week)	37
US Billboard Hot 100	33
US Hot R&B/Hip-Hop Songs (Billboard)	4
US Rhythmic Airplay (Billboard)	19
US Top 100 Pop Singles (Cash Box)	30

=== Year-end charts ===
Chart (1993)	Position
US Hot R&B Singles (Billboard)	31

== Release history ==
List of release dates, showing region, release format, label catalog number, and reference
Region	Date	Format(s)	Label(s)	Ref.
United States	September 28, 1992	Cassette	LaFace	
United States	December 4, 1992	CD	LaFace	
United Kingdom	November 21, 1994	7-inch vinyl; 12-inch vinyl; CD; cassette	Arista; LaFace	
