= Toni Braxton (album) =

1993 studio album by Toni Braxton

Studio album by Toni Braxton
- Released: July 13, 1993
- Recorded: May 1992; November 1992–1993
- Studios: LaCoCo (Atlanta) (Note: Tracks 1–7 and 10); Doppler (Atlanta) (Note: Tracks 1, 2, 4, 6 and 7); Bosstown (Atlanta) (Note: Track 4); Elumba (Los Angeles) (Note: Track 5); Encore (Burbank, California); Summa Music Group (Los Angeles) (Note: Track 7); Oasis (North Hollywood, California) (Note: Engineering on track 8); Newark Sound (Newark, New Jersey) (Note: Track 9); Central (Bladensburg, Maryland) (Note: Track 11)
- Genres: R&B; pop; soul
- Length: 53:18
- Labels: LaFace; Arista
- Producers: Babyface; Vassal Benford; Bo & McArthur; Vincent Herbert; Ernesto Phillips; L.A. Reid; Daryl Simmons; Tim & Ted

Toni Braxton chronology
Toni Braxton (1993)	Secrets (1996)

Singles from Toni Braxton
- 1. "Another Sad Love Song" Released: June 11, 1993; 2. "Breathe Again" Released: October 6, 1993; 3. "Seven Whole Days" Released: October 8, 1993; 4. "You Mean the World to Me" Released: April 21, 1994; 5. "I Belong to You"/"How Many Ways" Released: June 10, 1994

Toni Braxton is the debut studio album by American singer Toni Braxton, released on July 13, 1993, by LaFace Records and Arista Records. The album was primarily produced by L.A. Reid, Babyface, and Daryl Simmons.

The album has sold 5,135,000 copies in the United States and 10 million copies worldwide. It earned Braxton several awards, including three Grammy Awards (for Best New Artist and two consecutive awards for Best Female R&B Vocal Performance in 1994 and 1995). She also won two American Music Awards (for Favorite Soul/R&B New Artist and Favorite New Adult Contemporary Artist) in 1994 and another one in 1995 (for Favorite Soul/R&B Album).

== Background ==
Braxton and her four sisters—Traci, Towanda, Trina, and Tamar—signed with Arista Records as the Braxtons in 1989. The following year, the group released their debut single, "Good Life". Though the song was commercially unsuccessful, it attracted the attention of record executive Antonio "L.A." Reid and record producer Kenneth "Babyface" Edmonds, who were shopping around for talent for their new label LaFace Records. Instead of signing the quintet, they opted to offer Braxton a contract as a solo artist. With only one year to finish at Bowie State University, where she was studying to become a music teacher, she relocated to Atlanta to pursue a singing career.

== Release ==
The first single, "Another Sad Love Song", peaked at numbers seven and two on the Billboard Hot 100 and Hot R&B/Hip-Hop Songs charts, respectively. The album's second single, "Breathe Again", reached the top five of both the Hot 100 and R&B charts and at number two on the UK Singles Chart. Other singles were released from Toni Braxton in 1994, including "You Mean the World to Me", "Seven Whole Days", and the double A-side "I Belong to You"/"How Many Ways".

In Japan, the album was released as Love Affair, also a song on the album. The Japanese edition contains the same track listing as the standard version; the only difference is the Obi strip and the bonus lyrics booklet written in Japanese.

== Critical reception ==
Professional ratings
Review scores
Source	Rating
AllMusic	4.5/5 stars
Chicago Tribune	2.5/4 stars
Entertainment Weekly	C
Los Angeles Times	3/4 stars
The Philadelphia Inquirer	2/4 stars
Q	3/5 stars
Rolling Stone	2/5 stars
The Rolling Stone Album Guide	3/5 stars
The Tampa Tribune	3/4 stars
USA Today	3.5/4 stars

Toni Braxton received positive reviews from music critics. Ron Wynn from AllMusic said that the album showcased Braxton as "an elegant and earthy songstress, nicely balancing those seemingly divergent sentiments [...] Braxton's husky, enticing voice sounds hypnotic, dismayed, and disillusioned [...] but she's never out of control, indignant, or so anguished and hurt that she fails to retain her dignity." Los Angeles Times critic Connie Johnson wrote: "Sounding like an unlikely hybrid of Phyllis Hyman, Anita Baker and Tracy Chapman, Braxton's sultry, earthy delivery makes her a standout in today's R&B arena." Similarly, People found that "when Braxton slides into her lower register she echoes Anita Baker, and when she skips around the higher notes there's also a hint of Whitney Houston. The influences are there, but Toni Braxton is most definitely her own woman. On this sophisticated, stylish and soulful album, she slates her case."

Mitchell May, writing for the Chicago Tribune, noted that "Braxton wisely lets the mood of a tune dictate her approach, allowing her to supply an emotional depth that perhaps even the songwriters didn't know was there." He also found, however, that "the disc loses steam around midpoint." In a mixed review, Rolling Stone journalist John McAlley felt that "Braxton has got chops and spunk... And, yes, there are a handful of songs in which she gets to do the do. But there's not a poet in the house among LaFace's family of writer-producers – no Smokey Robinson, no Linda Creed. And for all its polish, too much of the music on Toni Braxton mistakes melodrama for passion and set pieces for soul." Marisa Fox of Entertainment Weekly found much of the album "generic" and concluded that Braxton "can sing, but there's nothing in her songs or delivery to set her apart from any number of wine-cooler R&B divas." Village Voice critic Robert Christgau gave the album a "neither" rating in his Consumer Guide book.

=== Accolades ===
The album earned Braxton several awards, including three Grammy Awards (for Best New Artist and two consecutive awards for Best Female R&B Vocal Performance in 1994 and 1995). She also won two American Music Awards (for Favorite Soul/R&B New Artist and Favorite New Adult Contemporary Artist) in 1994 and another one in 1995 (for Favorite Soul/R&B Album).

== Commercial performance ==
Toni Braxton debuted at number 36 on the Billboard 200 for the week ending July 31, 1993. Following Braxton's appearance at the American Music Awards of 1994, the album rose from number seven to number one in its 31st week on the chart, on the issue dated February 26, 1994, becoming the first number-one album for LaFace Records. It spent a second non-consecutive week atop the Billboard 200 for the week ending March 19, 1994, following the 36th Annual Grammy Awards. To date, it is Braxton's sole chart-topping album in the US. The album has sold 5,135,000 copies in the United States and 10 million copies worldwide.

== Track listing ==
No.	Title	Writer(s)	Producer(s)	Length
1.	"Another Sad Love Song"	Babyface; Daryl Simmons	L.A. Reid; Babyface; Simmons	5:01
2.	"Breathe Again"	Babyface	Reid; Babyface; Simmons	4:29
3.	"Seven Whole Days"	Babyface; Antonio Reid	Reid; Babyface; Simmons	6:22
4.	"Love Affair"	Tim Thomas; Ted Bishop	Tim & Ted	4:28
5.	"Candlelight"	Gaylor D; John Barnes	Reid; Babyface; Simmons	4:36
6.	"Spending My Time with You"	Bo & McArthur	Bo & McArthur	4:08
7.	"Love Shoulda Brought You Home"	Babyface; Simmons; Bo Watson	Reid; Babyface; Simmons	4:56
8.	"I Belong to You"	Vassal Benford (also music); Ronald Spearman	Benford	3:53
9.	"How Many Ways"	Vincent Herbert (also music); Toni Braxton; Ben Garrison (music); Noel Goring (music); Keith Miller^{[a]}; Philip Field^{[a]}; Anthony Beard^{[a]}	Herbert	4:45
10.	"You Mean the World to Me"	Reid; Babyface; Simmons	Reid; Babyface; Simmons	4:53
11.	"Best Friend"	Braxton; Vance Taylor	Ernesto Phillips; Braxton^{[b]}	4:28
12.	"Breathe Again" (Reprise)	Babyface	Reid; Babyface; Simmons	1:19
Total length:				53:18

European edition bonus track
No.	Title	Writer(s)	Producer(s)	Length
13.	"Give U My Heart" (Mad Ball Mix)	Watson; Babyface; Reid; Simmons	Reid; Babyface; Simmons; Herbert^{[c]}	6:11
Total length:				59:29

Spanish edition bonus track
No.	Title	Writer(s)	Producer(s)	Length
14.	"Breathe Again" (Spanish version)	Babyface	Reid; Babyface; Simmons; K. C. Porter^{[d]}	4:30
Total length:				63:59

=== Notes ===
- ^{^[a]} Despite not being credited as songwriters of "How Many Ways" in the album's liner notes, Keith Miller, Philip Field, and Anthony Beard are listed as songwriters by ASCAP and BMI.
- ^{^[b]} signifies a co-producer
- ^{^[c]} signifies a remixer and additional producer
- ^{^[d]} signifies a remix producer

== Personnel ==
Credits adapted from the liner notes of Toni Braxton.

=== Musicians ===
- Toni Braxton – lead vocals (all tracks); background vocals (tracks 1–6, 8–12)
- Kayo – bass (tracks 1, 5–7, 10)
- Babyface – keyboards (tracks 1–3, 5, 7, 10, 12); background vocals (track 7)
- L.A. Reid – drums (tracks 1–3, 5–7, 10, 12)
- Debra Killings – background vocals (tracks 1, 7)
- DeRock – percussion (tracks 2, 3, 10)
- Vance Taylor – keyboards (tracks 3, 5, 10); acoustic piano (track 7)
- Pamela Copeland – background vocals (tracks 3, 4)
- Tammy Davis – background vocals (track 3)
- Keisha Jackson – background vocals (track 3)
- Tim & Ted – drums, keyboards (track 4)
- Skip Pruitt – saxophone (track 4)
- Tim Thomas – background vocals (track 4)
- Tye-V – background vocals (track 4)
- Bo Watson – keyboards (tracks 6, 7); synthesizer programming, vocal arrangement, rhythm arrangement (track 6)
- McArthur – guitar (track 6)
- Tomi M – guitar (track 6)
- Trina Broussard – background vocals (track 7)
- Valerie Davis – background vocals (track 8)
- Rex Rideout – keyboards, programming (track 11)
- Ernesto Phillips – guitar (track 11)
- Orlando Phillips – bass guitar (track 11)

=== Technical ===
- L.A. Reid – production (tracks 1–3, 5, 7, 10, 12); mixing (tracks 1–7, 12); executive production
- Babyface – production (tracks 1–3, 5, 7, 10, 12); executive production
- Daryl Simmons – production (tracks 1–3, 5, 7, 10, 12)
- Jim "Z" Zumpano – engineering (tracks 1–7, 10, 12)
- John Rogers – engineering (track 1)
- Barney Perkins – mixing (tracks 1, 7); engineering (track 7)
- Dave Way – mixing (tracks 2–5, 12)
- John Frye – mixing assistance (tracks 2–6, 12); additional MIDI programming (tracks 2, 3, 10, 12); engineering assistance (track 6)
- Tim & Ted – production (track 4)
- Ron Horvath – engineering (track 4)
- Phil Tan – engineering (track 4)
- Thom Kidd – engineering (track 4)
- Ted Bishop – engineering (track 4)
- Brad Gilderman – engineering (track 5)
- Randy Walker – technician (track 5)
- Bo & McArthur – production (track 6)
- Jason Schablik – engineering assistance (track 6)
- Jon Gass – mixing (track 6)
- Fil Brown – engineering (track 7)
- Steve Schwartzberg – engineering (track 7)
- Matt Westfield – engineering (track 7)
- Sean Young – engineering (track 7)
- Milton Chan – mixing assistance (track 7)
- Vassal Benford – production (track 8)
- Victor Flores – engineering, mixing (track 8)
- Vincent Herbert – production, mixing (track 9)
- Ben Garrison – engineering, mixing (track 9)
- Ernesto Phillips – production, mixing (track 11)
- Toni Braxton – co-production (track 11)
- Bill Plummer – engineering (track 11)
- Bob Rosa – mixing (track 11)
- Dana Vlcek – mix engineering assistance (track 11)
- Herb Powers Jr. – mastering
- Constance Armstrong – album coordination
- Davett Singletary – project coordination

=== Artwork ===
- Susan Mendola – art direction
- Daniela Federici – photography

== Charts ==
=== Weekly charts ===
Weekly chart performance for Toni Braxton
Chart (1993–1997)	Peak position
Australian Albums (ARIA)	6
Canada Top Albums/CDs (RPM)	4
Dutch Albums (Album Top 100)	11
European Albums (Music & Media)	21
German Albums (Offizielle Top 100)	7
Hungarian Albums (MAHASZ)	39
Japanese Albums (Oricon)	79
New Zealand Albums (RMNZ)	2
Norwegian Albums (VG-lista)	14
Scottish Albums (Official Charts)	36
Spanish Albums (AFYVE)	17
Swedish Albums (Sverigetopplistan)	24
UK Albums (Official Charts)	4
UK R&B Albums (Official Charts)	19
US Billboard 200	1
US Top R&B/Hip-Hop Albums (Billboard)	1

=== Year-end charts ===
1993 year-end chart performance for Toni Braxton
Chart (1993)	Position
US Billboard 200	69
US Top R&B/Hip-Hop Albums (Billboard)	10

1994 year-end chart performance for Toni Braxton
Chart (1994)	Position
Australian Albums (ARIA)	56
Canada Top Albums/CDs (RPM)	17
Dutch Albums (Album Top 100)	34
European Albums (Music & Media)	58
German Albums (Offizielle Top 100)	83
New Zealand Albums (RMNZ)	19
UK Albums (OCC)	49
US Billboard 200	7
US Top R&B/Hip-Hop Albums (Billboard)	3

1995 year-end chart performance for Toni Braxton
Chart (1995)	Position
US Billboard 200	172
US Top R&B/Hip-Hop Albums (Billboard)	82

1997 year-end chart performance for Toni Braxton
Chart (1997)	Position
German Albums (Offizielle Top 100)	52

=== Decade-end charts ===
Decade-end chart performance for Toni Braxton
Chart (1990–1999)	Position
US Billboard 200	68

=== All-time charts ===
All-time chart performance for Toni Braxton
Chart	Position
US Billboard 200 (Women)	94

== Certifications and sales ==
Certifications and sales for Toni Braxton
Region	Certification	Certified units/sales
Australia (ARIA)	Gold	35,000^{^}
Canada (Music Canada)	2× Platinum	200,000^{^}
Japan (RIAJ)	Gold	100,000^{^}
Netherlands (NVPI)	Gold	50,000^{^}
New Zealand (RMNZ)	Platinum	15,000^{^}
United Kingdom (BPI)	Gold	100,000^{^}
United States (RIAA)	8× Platinum	6,107,000 (Note: As of April 2011, Toni Braxton had sold 5,135,000 copies in the United States according to Nielsen SoundScan, with an additional 972,000 copies sold at BMG Music Club. Nielsen SoundScan does not count albums sold through clubs like the BMG Music Service, which were significantly popular in the 1990s.)
Summaries
Worldwide	—	10,000,000
^{^} Shipments figures based on certification alone.

== Release history ==
Release history for Toni Braxton
Region	Date	Label	Ref.
United States	July 13, 1993	LaFace; Arista	
Japan	September 22, 1993	BMG	
United Kingdom	September 27, 1993	Arista	

== See also ==
- List of Billboard 200 number-one albums of 1994
- List of Billboard 200 number-one R&B albums of 1993
