= Daryl Simmons =

American record producer

- Born: Daryl L. Simmons; Indianapolis, Indiana, U.S.
- Genres: R&B; soul; pop; new jack swing; dance-pop; soft rock
- Occupations: Record producer; songwriter; music consultant
- Years active: 1977–present
- Labels: LaFace; Silent Partner Productions; Warner Chappell Music
- Website: www.darylsimmons.com

Daryl L. Simmons (born April 11, 1957) is an American R&B record producer and songwriter. Best known for his production work with L.A. Reid and Kenneth "Babyface" Edmonds, Simmons was credited on most albums by their label LaFace Records and several of Edmonds' solo albums. In 1977, he formed the R&B collective Manchild, which recorded two soul and funk albums and became known for their hit song, "Especially for You," released that same year by Chi Sound Records. Edmonds, Reggie Griffin, and Charles "Chuckie" Bush were among Manchild's revolving members.

He has written and composed songs such as "End Of The Road" (Boyz II Men), "Super Woman" (Karyn White), "Breathe Again" (Toni Braxton), "Why I Love You So Much" (Monica), "I'm Ready" (Tevin Campbell), "Baby Baby Baby" (TLC), "My My My" (Johnny Gill), "We're Not Making Love No More" (Dru Hill) and "Queen of the Night" (Whitney Houston).

== Discography ==
=== Additional Vocals ===
- Bobby Brown – "On Our Own" (1989)

=== Studio albums ===
- Christmas With You (2022)

=== Singles ===
- "What Does It Take" (as Murfee De'Rock) (1985)

== Awards and nominations ==
Grammy Awards

Year	Nominated work	Award	Result
1989	"Don't Be Cruel"	Best R&B Song	Nominated
1990	"Superwoman"	Best R&B Song	Nominated
1991	"My, My, My"	Best R&B Song	Nominated
1993	"End of the Road"	Best R&B Song	Won
1994	"Can We Talk"	Best R&B Song	Nominated
1995	"You Mean the World to Me"	Best R&B Song	Nominated
