= Artist Collection: Toni Braxton =

Greatest hits album by Toni Braxton
- Released: October 12, 2004
- Recorded: 1992–2003
- Genre: R&B
- Label: LaFace, BMG Heritage Records

Toni Braxton chronology
Platinum & Gold Collection (2003)	Artist Collection: Toni Braxton (2004)	Un-Break My Heart: The Remix Collection (2005)

Artist Collection: Toni Braxton is the third greatest hits compilation by American R&B singer Toni Braxton, released in 2004 by BMG Heritage Records, exclusively released for South America. The compilation was released at the same time that "Platinum & Gold Collection" was released. In addition to her most famous hits, such as "Un-Break My Heart", "Breathe Again", "He Wasn't Man Enough" and others, the album collects some of Braxton's random tracks from her latest albums, "The Heat" (2000), "Snowflakes of Love" (2001) and "More Than a Woman" (2002).

== Background and content ==
"Artist Collection: Toni Braxton" is Braxton's third compilation of greatest hits, released at the same time "Platinum & Gold Collection" was released, on October 12, 2004, being released specifically for South America. The compilation collects some of Braxton's biggest hits, such as "Love Shoulda Brought You Home", "Breathe Again", "Un-Break My Heart" and "He Wasn't Man Enough", while many other songs are not singles, being found on her last three albums, "The Heat" (such as "The Art of Love"), "Snowflakes" (such as Snowflakes of Love) and "More Than a Woman" (such as "Lies, Lies, Lies", "Me and My Boyfriend" and others).

== Critical reception ==
Professional ratings
Review scores
Source	Rating
Allmusic	3/5 stars

Andy Kellman of Allmusic states that the compilation "is an alternative to the more widely available Ultimate Toni Braxton. On the surface, it appears to only be a shortened version of Ultimate Toni Braxton, with four less tracks, but a deeper look reveals a very different compilation. This set is recommendable only if you'd prefer to do without 'Another Sad Love Song,' 'I Love Me Some Him,' 'Hit the Freeway,' 'I Don't Want To,' and another handful of Braxton's U.S. chart hits. A comparison of the two discs does help show how the perception of an artist's best material can differ from territory to territory."

== Track listing ==
Disc one
No.	Title	Writer(s)	Producer(s)	Length
1.	"He Wasn't Man Enough"	LaShawn Daniels; Fred Jerkins III; Rodney Jerkins; Harvey Mason, Jr.	Darkchild	4:02
2.	"Un-Break My Heart"	Diane Warren	David Foster	4:32
3.	"Lies, Lies, Lies"	Keri Lewis; Stokley Williams	Lewis	5:11
4.	"Let It Flow"	Babyface	Babyface	4:24
5.	"Just Be a Man About It"	Johntá Austin; Teddy Bishop; Braxton; Bryan-Michael Cox	Bishop; Braxton; Cox	4:16
6.	"Love Shoulda Brought You Home"	Babyface; Simons; Bo Watson	Babyface; Reid; Simmons	4:53
7.	"There's No Me Without You"	Babyface	Babyface	4:21
8.	"Give It Back" (featuring Big Tymers)	Tamar Braxton; Toni Braxton; Byron Thomas; Bryan Williams	Mannie Fresh	3:40
9.	"I'm Still Breathing"	Warren	Foster	4:17
10.	"Tell Me"	Anita Baker; Anthony Bias; Toni Braxton; Louis Johnson; Keri Lewis	Lewis	4:11
11.	"Breathe Again"	Babyface	Babyface; Reid; Simmons	4:16
12.	"The Art of Love"	Braxton, Lewis	Braxton, Lewis	3:48
13.	"Me & My Boyfriend"	Tamar Braxton; Toni Braxton; Darryl Harper; Irving Lorenzo; Andre Parker; Ricky Rouse; Tupac Shakur; Tyrone Wrice	Irv Gotti; Chink Santana	3:44
14.	"Snowflakes of Love"	Braxton; Isaac Hayes; Lewis	Braxton, Lewis	4:26
