= From Toni with Love... The Video Collection =

From Toni With Love... The Video Collection

Video by Toni Braxton
- Released: November 20, 2001
- Recorded: 1992–2000
- Genre: Pop; R&B; Soul
- Length: 67 mins (only the music videos)
- Label: La Face

Toni Braxton chronology
Toni Braxton: The Hit Video Collection (1994)	From Toni With Love... The Video Collection (2001)

"From Toni with Love... The Video Collection is a greatest videos VHS/DVD compilation by American recording artist Toni Braxton, released by La Face Records on November 20, 2001. The collection contained all of Braxton's music videos from 1992 to 2001, including 2 alternate version videos, 4 remixes, and 2 Spanish videos. It also includes behind-the-scenes clips and two different video biographies of the singer.

== Background and content ==
"From Toni with Love... The Video Collection" is the second greatest videos VHS/DVD compilation released by Toni Braxton, following her 1994 compilation, "The Hit Video Collection". The compilation contains Braxton's videos since her beginning in 1992, until the videos from "The Heat", in 2000. In addition to her 14 official videos, which also includes commentary from Braxton for each of the videos, the collection features 2 alternate version videos (the "unreleased" black and white version of "Another Sad Love Song" and the "European version of "Breathe Again"), 4 remixes ("How Many Ways", "You're Makin' Me High", "Un-Break My Heart" and "Spanish Guitar", 2 Spanish videos ("Breathe Again" and "Un-Break My Heart") and also the unreleased video of "Maybe". It also includes behind-the-scenes clips, live performances and two different video biographies of the singer.

== Reception ==
Rotten Tomatoes wrote that "'From Toni with Love' is so chock full of music videos, rare interviews, and previously unreleased remixes that it does seem like the singer is sending a love letter to her fans."

== Chart performance ==
"From Toni With Love... The Video Collection" was certified gold in Brazil, in 2009, for selling over 15,000 copies.

== Track listing ==
No.	Title	Writer(s)	Director(s)	Length
1.	"Love Shoulda Brought You Home"	Bo Watson; Daryl Simmons; Kenneth "Babyface" Edmonds	Ralph Ziman	4:27
2.	"Another Sad Love Song"	Babyface; Simmons	Antoine Fuqua; Ziman	4:00
3.	"Breathe Again"	Babyface	Randee St. Nicholas	4:29
4.	"Seven Whole Days"	Babyface; LA Reid	Lionel C. Martin	4:32
5.	"You Mean the World to Me"	Babyface; Simmons; Reid	Martin	4:00
6.	"How Many Ways"	Toni Braxton; Philip Field; Noel Goring; Vincent Herbert; Keith Miller	Martin	4:24
7.	"Let It Flow"	Babyface	Herb Ritts	3:48
8.	"You're Makin' Me High"	Babyface; Braxton; Wilson	Billie Woodruff	3:54
9.	"Un-Break My Heart"	Diane Warren	Woodruff	4:33
10.	"I Don't Want To"	R. Kelly	Woodruff	4:18
11.	"How Could an Angel Break My Heart"	Babyface; Braxton	Iain Softley	4:18
12.	"He Wasn't Man Enough"	LaShawn Daniels; Fred Jerkins III; Rodney "Darkchild" Jerkins; Harvey Mason, Jr.	Woodruff	4:39
13.	"Just Be a Man About It"	Johntá Austin; Teddy Bishop; Braxton; Bryan-Michael Cox	Woodruff	4:48
14.	"Spanish Guitar"	Warren	Woodruff	4:56

Extras - Special Features by Album (Toni Braxton)
No.	Title	Director(s)	Length
1.	"Another Sad Love Song [unreleased]"	Antoine Fuqua; Ralph Ziman	4:05
2.	"Breathe Again [European Version]"	Randee St. Nicholas	4:30
3.	"Breathe Again [Spanish Version]"	Nicholas	4:30
4.	"How Many Ways [Remix Video]"	Lionel C. Martin	4:03
5.	"Interview"		3:48

Extras - Special Features by Album (Secrets)
No.	Title	Director(s)	Length
1.	"You're Makin' Me High [Remix Video]"	Video remix created by Back2Back	3:40
2.	"Un-Break My Heart [Remix Video]"	Video remix created by Promo Only	5:27
3.	"Un-Break My Heart [Spanish Version]"	Billie Woodruff	4:30
4.	"Bio '97"		5:02

Extras - Special Features by Album (Heat)
No.	Title	Director(s)	Length
1.	"Spanish Guitar [Royal Garden's Flamenco Mix]"	Video remix created by Back2Back	4:41
2.	"Spanish Guitar [Live in UK]"		5:01
3.	"He Wasn't Man Enough [Live in UK]"		4:46
4.	"He Wasn't Man Enough [The Making of the Video]"		7:00
5.	"Album Teaser"		2:55
6.	"Bio 2000"		6:00
7.	"The Heat [TV Spot]"		0:30
8.	"Maybe [The Unreleased Video]"		1:14
