= Platinum & Gold Collection (Toni Braxton album) =

Greatest hits album by Toni Braxton
- Released: October 12, 2004
- Recorded: 1992–2003
- Genre: R&B
- Length: 75:23
- Label: LaFace; BMG Heritage

Toni Braxton chronology
Ultimate Toni Braxton (2003)	Platinum & Gold Collection (2004)	Un-Break My Heart: The Remix Collection (2005)

Platinum & Gold Collection, released in 2004, is the second greatest hits compilation by Toni Braxton, following Ultimate Toni Braxton released in 2003. It is a budget CD with fewer songs than Ultimate, but it has the remix versions of some songs. Although the album was not given a proper release in the United States and is considered an international release, it has sold 281,518 copies in the US as of February 2012.

== Background and content ==
After failing to spawn any substantial hits of her last two albums, "Snowflakes" (2001) and "More Than a Woman" (2002), Braxton released her first compilation album, "Ultimate Toni Braxton", in 2003. Later, in 2004, BMG Heritage Records released her second greatest hits compilation, titled Platinum & Gold compilation. The collection includes 12 tracks, such as her hits "He Wasn't Man Enough", "Another Sad Love Song," "Breathe Again," "You Mean the World to Me," "Un-Break My Heart," but not "You're Makin' Me High". The album also features the non-single "A Better Man", taken from "More Than a Woman".

== Critical reception ==
Professional ratings
Review scores
Source	Rating
AllMusic	3.5/5 stars

Jason Birchmeier of AllMusic wrote, "Platinum & Gold Collection rounds up and remasters most of substantial hits from Braxton's past, in the process showcasing just how many great songs she'd recorded back in the mid-'90s, when she was among the biggest of big stars. However, he didn't like the inclusion of A Better Man and Hit the Freeway, writing that, "these songs are good, but they're not great, especially relative to songs like, say, 'You're Makin' Me High,' one of Braxton's best and one that's unfortunately missing here (a very glaring omission). So while Braxton's Platinum & Gold Collection is a nice compilation -- one that includes many of her most memorable hits and does so in first-rate fashion, in terms of remastering as well as packaging -- it's a compilation that is sure to leave you unsatisfied. You'd be better off spending the extra money to pick up a more definitive collection like the 18-track Ultimate Toni Braxton from 2003 than this 50-minute budget-line CD."

== Chart performance ==
Platinum & Gold Collection peaked at number 78 on the US Billboard Top R&B/Hip-Hop Albums chart, spending five weeks on the chart, while selling over 281,518 copies in the US as of February 2012.

== Track listing ==
Platinum & Gold Collection track listing
No.	Title	Writer(s)	Producer(s)	Length
1.	"Another Sad Love Song"	Kenneth "Babyface" Edmonds; Daryl Simmons	Babyface; L.A. Reid; Simmons	3:51
2.	"Breathe Again"	Babyface	Babyface; Reid; Simmons	4:18
3.	"How Could an Angel Break My Heart" (remix)	Babyface; Toni Braxton	Babyface	4:21
4.	"I Belong to You"	Vassal Benford; Ronald Spearman	Benford	3:53
5.	"You Mean the World to Me"	Babyface; Reid; Simmons	Babyface; Reid; Simmons	4:00
6.	"Un-Break My Heart"	Diane Warren	David Foster	4:29
7.	"How Many Ways" (R. Kelly remix)	Braxton; Philip Field; Noel Goring; Vincent Herbert; Keith Miller	Herbert	5:47
8.	"He Wasn't Man Enough"	LaShawn Daniels; Fred Jerkins III; Rodney Jerkins; Harvey Mason Jr.	Darkchild	4:01
9.	"Maybe" (radio edit remix)	Braxton; Keith Crouch; Samuel Gause; Mechalie Jamison; John Smith	Crouch	3:59
10.	"A Better Man"	Gerrard C. Baker; Andrea Martin; Ivan Matias	Martin; Matias	4:00
11.	"Hit the Freeway" (featuring Loon)	Chauncey Hawkins; Pharrell Williams	The Neptunes	3:48
12.	"Spanish Guitar" (HQ2 Radio Edit)	Warren	Foster	4:10

== Charts ==
Chart performance for Platinum & Gold Collection
Chart (2004)	Peak position
US Top R&B/Hip-Hop Albums (Billboard)	78
