= Un-Break My Heart: The Remix Collection =

Remix album by Toni Braxton
- Released: April 12, 2005
- Recorded: 1996–2005
- Label: LaFace; Legacy; SBMG Records
- Producer: Joe Claussell; Hosh Gureli; Hex Hector; Frankie Knuckles; David Morales; Peter Rauhofer; Junior Vasquez

Toni Braxton chronology
Platinum & Gold (2004)	Un-Break My Heart: The Remix Collection (2005)	Breathe Again: Toni Braxton at Her Best (2005)

Un-Break My Heart: The Remix Collection is the first remix album by American R&B singer Toni Braxton, released on April 12, 2005, by Sony BMG Music Entertainment in association with La Face Records and Legacy Recordings, while on iTunes, it was released a month later, on March 31, 2005. It takes its name from Braxton's signature ballad, "Un-Break My Heart".

Un-Break My Heart: The Remix Collection features ten club mixes by Hex Hector, David Morales, Frankie Knuckles, Peter Rauhofer and Junior Vasquez among others, with the track list consisting of songs from her albums Secrets, The Heat, and More Than a Woman. It is formatted as a continuous club mix. The compilation received a favorable review from Allmusic, which praised it for being a welcome change of pace and praised Hex Hector's remixes.

== Background and content ==
"Un-Break My Heart: The Remix Collection" is Braxton's first remix album, being released on April 12, 2005, in the United States by Sony BMG Music Entertainment. It was released on March 31, 2005, on iTunes. The album includes remixes only from "Secrets" (1996) and "The Heat" (2000).

Hex Hector remixed the songs "Spanish Guitar", "Maybe" and "Hit the Freeway", while Frankie Knuckles provided remixes for "I Don't Want To" and "Un-Break My Heart". David Morales remixed "You're Makin' Me High", while Junior Vasquez providing a remix for "He Wasn't Man Enough".

== Critical reception ==
Professional ratings
Review scores
Source	Rating
AllMusic	3/5 stars

Andy Kellman of AllMusic gave the album 3 out of 5 stars, writing that, "'Un-Break My Heart: The Remix Collection' is a nice change of pace from the typical patched-together cash-in compilation of remixes," praising Hex Hector for "allowing enough room for the bulk of each track to play, rather than showing off quick-wristed skills that would likely knock the wind out of the selections." Kellman picked "the 'HQ2' mix of 'Hit the Freeway,' Frankie Knuckles mix of 'Un-Break My Heart,' and Peter Rauhofer's mix of 'He Wasn't Man Enough' as the highlights."

== Track listing ==
No.	Title	Writer(s)	Mixer(s)	Length
1.	"Intro"	Diane Warren	Soul Solution; Hex Hector	1:18
2.	"Un-Break My Heart" (Soul Hex Anthem Vocal Mix)	Warren	Solution; Hector	5:51
3.	"Spanish Guitar" (HQ2 Club Mix)	Warren	Hector; Mac Quayle	7:48
4.	"You're Makin' Me High" (David Morales Classic Mix)	Bryce Wilson; Kenneth Edmonds	David Morales	8:17
5.	"I Don't Want To" (Frankie Knuckles Franktified Club Mix)	R. Kelly	Frankie Knuckles	7:32
6.	"Hit the Freeway" (HQ2 Club Mix)	Pharrell Williams; Chauncey Hawkins	Hector; Quayle	4:25
7.	"He Wasn't Man Enough" (Peter Rauhofer NYC Club Mix)	Rodney Jerkins; Fred Jerkins III; LaShawn Daniels; Harvey Mason Jr.	Peter Rauhofer	6:38
8.	"He Wasn't Man Enough" (Junior Vasquez Marathon Mix)	Jerkins; Jerkins III; Daniels; Mason Jr.	Junior Vasquez	3:45
9.	"Maybe" (HQ2/Dynamix NYC Club Mix)	Braxton; Keith Crouch; Samuel Gause; Mechalie Jamison; John Smith	Hector; Quayle; Eddie Cumana; Beppe Savoni	4:20
10.	"Un-Break My Heart" (Frankie Knuckles Franktidrama Club Mix)	Warren	Knuckles	8:28
11.	"Spanish Guitar" (Joe Claussell Main Mix)	Warren	Joaquin Claussell	6:21

== Personnel ==
- Audio Remixers: Joaquin "Joe" Claussell, Eddie Cumana, J-Dub, Hex Hector, Frankie Knuckles, David Morales, Mac Quayle, Peter Rauhofer, Beppe Savoni, Soul Solution.
- Photographer: Daniela Federici.
- Arrangers: Toni Braxton, Keith Crouch, David Foster, R. Kelly.

== Charts ==
The album charted on the US Top Electronic Albums chart, peaking at number 20.

Chart performance for Un-Break My Heart
Chart (2001)	Peak position
US Top Dance/Electronic Albums (Billboard)	20

== Release history ==
Release dates and formats for Un-Break My Heart
Region	Date	Label	Ref.
United States	April 12, 2005	Sony BMG Music Entertainment	
United States	March 31, 2005 (iTunes)	Sony BMG Music Entertainment	
