= Hit the Freeway =

2002 single by Toni Braxton featuring Loon

Single by Toni Braxton featuring Loon

from the album More Than a Woman
- Released: October 21, 2002
- Studio: The Record Plant (Hollywood, California); Circle House (Miami, Florida)
- Genre: R&B; hip-hop
- Length: 3:48
- Label: Arista
- Songwriters: Pharrell Williams; Chauncey Hawkins
- Producer: The Neptunes

Toni Braxton singles chronology
"Christmas in Jamaica" (2001)	"Hit the Freeway" (2002)	"Please" (2005)

"Hit the Freeway" is a song by American singer Toni Braxton from her fifth studio album, More Than a Woman (2002). The song, which features American rapper Loon, was written by Pharrell Williams and Loon himself, while production was handled by Pharrell's production duo the Neptunes. It is a hip-hop and R&B song, with lyrics about an ex trying to rekindle with Braxton, but Braxton claims she's not interested in him anymore. It was released on October 21, 2002, to rhythmic and urban contemporary radio as the lead and only single from the album.

The song received generally favorable reviews from music critics, who praised its catchiness and contagiousness, and picked it as a stand-out track. However, the song proved to be a failure on the charts, reaching the top-forty in Canada, Sweden, Switzerland, and the United Kingdom while reaching number 86 on the US Billboard Hot 100 chart. A music video, directed by Charles Infante and Dave Meyers, was released in October 2002 and features Braxton being chased by her ex.

== Background ==
After the success of her third studio album, The Heat (2000) and its lead single "He Wasn't Man Enough", which led her to win a Grammy for Best Female R&B Vocal Performance, Braxton promised an upbeat new album, saying, "People like the slow, miserable love songs of Toni Braxton, but maybe the Prozac is working now, so let's give 'em some happier songs." She started recording the album in March 2001, claiming that after a few tough years, she had a new personal happiness to bring to her music, part of that, she said, stems from her engagement to Keri Lewis of Mint Condition.

In late 2002, Braxton revealed in a statement, "I'm ready to show other sides of what I can do musically. My first love has always been R&B, and I've been into hip-hop since it first started. On each of my albums I've done things to introduce people to other aspects of what I'm about musically. Sometimes, artists can get confined by what they've done in the past. When people hear I'm working with the Neptunes, they're like 'I wonder what that will sound like?' I'm just being a part of my own generation — and we grew up with rap and hip-hop as well as R&B!"

== Release and composition ==
"Hit the Freeway" was released in early October 2002, and was the first and only single taken from More Than a Woman, due to Braxton's second pregnancy announced in the same month. The CD single features the radio edit and the extended version of the song, as well as a previously unreleased track called "And I Love You", which would later be featured on More Than a Woman, and a remix of her single "Maybe". The CD also contains an enhanced video, featuring "Hit the Freeway"'s music video. The song is featured on her compilations, Ultimate Toni Braxton (2003), Platinum & Gold Collection (2004), Un-Break My Heart: The Remix Collection (2005), The Essential Toni Braxton (2007) and Playlist: The Very Best of Toni Braxton (2008).

"Hit the Freeway" was written by Pharrell Williams and Loon, while production was handled by Pharrell's production duo the Neptunes. Pharrell also provides additional vocals. "Hit the Freeway" is a "saucy", uptempo and synth-driven hip-hop and R&B song, in which Braxton serves a flame his walking papers. Loon raps before the first verse and only lists all the things he bought her, "shoes from Milan, Louis Vuitton, animal arm bag and jewels on your arm". Then, Braxton talks about receiving a phone call from an ex-boyfriend, who she is not interested in hearing from anymore. Later he pipes in during the verses to respond to her point of view. In the chorus, Braxton sings, "Farewell my lonely one, nothing else here can be done, I don't ever wanna see you again".

== Critical reception ==
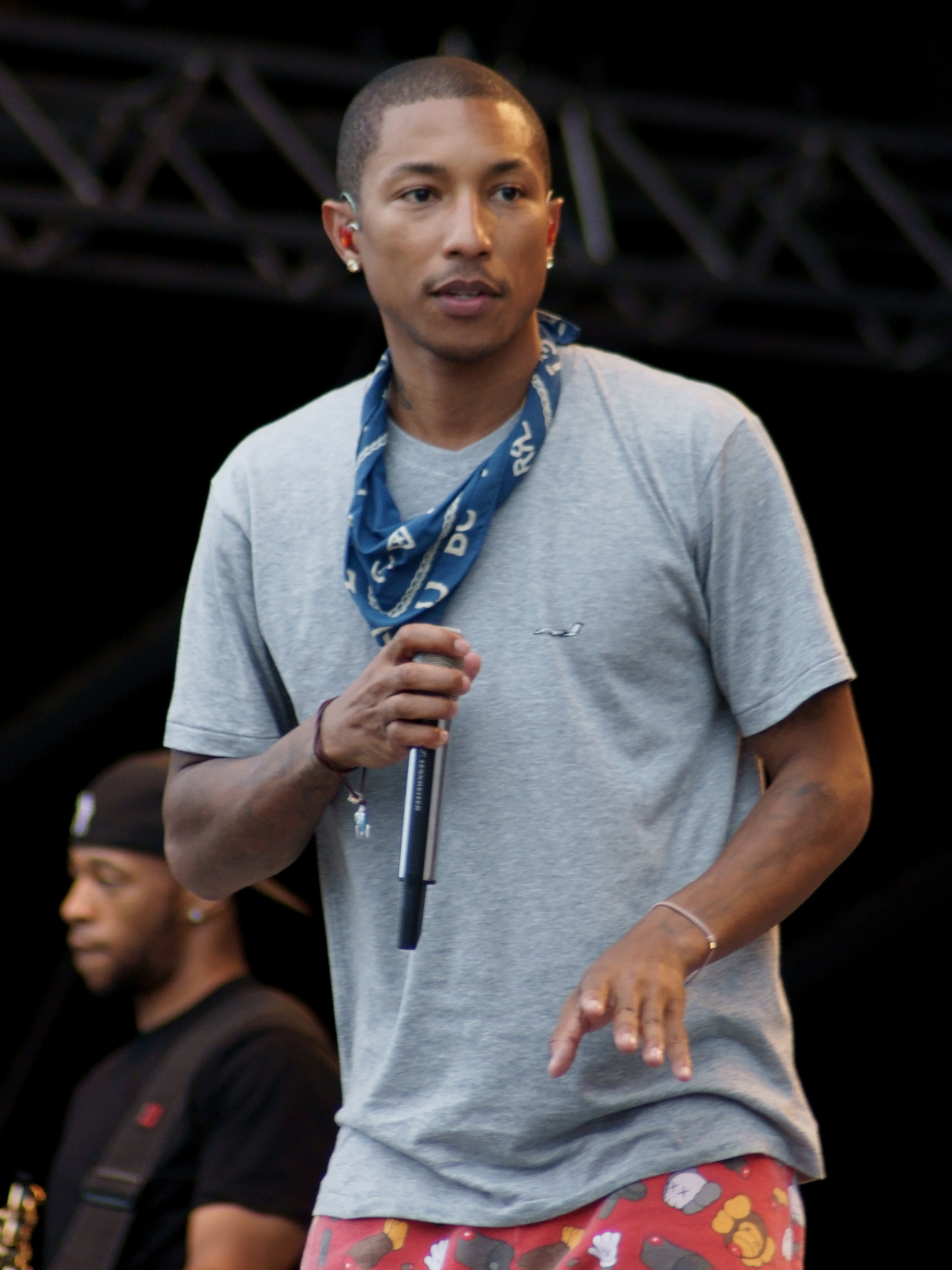
Pharrell Williams' production on "Hit the Freeway" received generally positive reviews.

The song received mostly favorable reviews from music critics. Stephen Thomas Erlewine of AllMusic picked the song as a stand-out track of the album. Keysha Davis of BBC Music called the chorus "eagerly contagious", writing that, "What at first sounds like a quintessential Neptunes track - melodic synthesiser, staged handclaps and funky drum patterns - later transpires into an impressive slice of pop R&B. Revenge has never sounded sweeter." Sal Cinquemani of Slant Magazine called it a "catchy and edgy hip-hop-flavored fare." Tracy E. Hopkins of Barnes & Noble wrote that the song "reveals Braxton's fondness for beats and rhymes."

Dan Gennoe of Yahoo! Music was less favorable, writing that, "The Neptunes muster a slack handful of their trademark bleeps and hope for the best with 'Hit The Freeway', leaving Braxton sounding, bizarrely, like the product of any number of Neptunes imitators." A Bland Is Out There review was also mixed, writing that "Loon's appearance is insignificant and poor", while "The Neptunes overpower the music with their beats, leaving her buried underneath." The review concluded, stating, "'Hit the Freeway' is a great, but flawed single. It could've been better if it wasn't so focused on the Neptunes-based production."

== Commercial performance ==
In the United States, "Hit the Freeway" peaked at number 86, becoming Braxton's lowest charting-single since "Spanish Guitar" (2000). On Billboard's Hot R&B/Hip-Hop Singles & Tracks chart, the song debuted at number 77 before moving to number 67. It peaked at number 32, being her third consecutive single to miss the top 20 on the R&B chart. It fared better on the Dance Club Play chart, where its remix peaked at number two. In the United Kingdom, the song entered the UK Singles Chart at number 29 on March 8, 2003.

In Australia, the song debuted and peaked at number 46 on the ARIA Singles Chart, only remaining on the chart for two weeks. It was also her lowest charting-single since "You Mean the World to Me" and her last single to chart in Australia. In Sweden, the song was her second-lowest-charting single, peaking at number 40, and was her last single to chart. In Switzerland, the song peaked at number 38, becoming her lowest-charting single ever there.

== Music video ==
The music video for "Hit the Freeway", directed by Charles Infante and Dave Meyers, was shot in Los Angeles, in September 2002. It tells the story of a woman leaving her cheating boyfriend. There are several shots of Braxton driving down the freeway while her ex follows her, trying to rekindle the relationship.

== Track listing ==
CD maxi single
No.	Title	Writer(s)	Producer(s)	Length
1.	"Hit the Freeway" (Radio Edit)	Pharrell Williams; Chauncey Hawkins	The Neptunes	3:48
2.	"Hit the Freeway" (Extended Version)	Williams; Hawkins	The Neptunes	6:27
3.	"And I Love You"	Kenneth Edmonds; Daryl Simmons	Babyface	4:02
4.	"Maybe" (HQ² Radio Mix)	Toni Braxton; Keith Crouch; John Smith; Mechallie Jamison; Samuel Gause	Crouch; Hex Hector^{[a]}	3:19
5.	"Hit the Freeway" (Enhanced Video)			4:47

CD single
No.	Title	Writer(s)	Producer(s)	Length
1.	"Hit the Freeway" (Radio Edit)	Williams; Hawkins	The Neptunes	3:48
2.	"Hit the Freeway" (Goldtrix Full Vocal Edit)	Williams; Hawkins	The Neptunes; Jamie Quinn & Daniel Goldstein^{[a]}	7:16
3.	"Hit the Freeway" (Beatzworkin' Remix)	Williams; Hawkins	The Neptunes; Beatzworkin'^{[a]}	5:58
4.	"Hit the Freeway" (Enhanced Video)			4:47

Notes

- ^{^[a]} signifies an additional producer

== Personnel ==
Personnel are adapted from the liner notes of More Than a Woman.

- Toni Braxton – vocals
- Andrew Coleman – recording
- Chad Hugo – arrangements, instruments, producing
- Loon – rap, songwriting
- Phil Tan – mixing
- Pharrell Williams – additional vocals, arrangements, instruments, producing

== Charts ==
=== Weekly charts ===
Weekly chart performance for "Hit the Freeway"
Chart (2002–2003)	Peak position
Australia (ARIA)	46
Australian Urban (ARIA)	13
Belgium (Ultratip Bubbling Under Flanders)	3
Belgium (Ultratip Bubbling Under Wallonia)	1
Canada (Nielsen SoundScan)	31
Denmark (Tracklisten)	17
Europe (Eurochart Hot 100)	85
Germany (GfK)	56
Ireland (IRMA)	40
Scotland Singles (OCC)	58
Sweden (Sverigetopplistan)	40
Switzerland (Schweizer Hitparade)	38
UK Singles (OCC)	29
UK Hip Hop/R&B (OCC)	4
US Billboard Hot 100	86
US Dance Club Songs (Billboard)	2
US Hot R&B/Hip-Hop Songs (Billboard)	32
US Urban (Radio & Records)	27

=== Year-end charts ===
Year-end chart performance for "Hit the Freeway"
Chart (2002)	Position
Canada (Nielsen SoundScan)	184
UK Urban (Music Week)	22

== Release history ==
Release dates and formats for "Hit the Freeway"
Region	Date	Format(s)	Label(s)	Ref.
United States	October 21, 2002	Rhythmic contemporary; urban radio	Arista	
Australia	November 18, 2002	CD	Arista; BMG	
United Kingdom	February 24, 2003	CD; cassette	Arista; BMG	
