= Breathe Again: Toni Braxton at Her Best =

Greatest hits album by Toni Braxton
- Released: April 26, 2005
- Recorded: 1993–2002
- Genre: R&B
- Length: 44:59
- Label: Sony BMG Music Entertainment
- Producer: Babyface; Keith Crouch; David Foster; Rodney "Darkchild" Jerkins; Keri Lewis; L.A. Reid; Daryl Simmons; Robert "Big Bert" Smith; Starpoint; Bryce Wilson

Toni Braxton chronology
Un-Break My Heart: The Remix Collection (2005)	Breathe Again: Toni Braxton at Her Best (2005)	Libra (2005)

Breathe Again: Toni Braxton at Her Best is the fourth greatest hits compilation album by American R&B singer Toni Braxton, released on April 26, 2005, through Sony BMG Music Entertainment. The compilation includes Braxton's hits, such as "Un-Break My Heart", "Breathe Again", "You're Makin' Me High", along with some non-singles from her debut album and "More Than a Woman".

== Background and content ==
"Breathe Again: Toni Braxton at Her Best" is the fourth compilation (and third greatest hits compilation) released by Braxton, following the remix compilation "Un-Break My Heart: The Remix Collection", also released in 2005. The compilation was released on April 26, 2005, by Sony BMG Music Entertainment. The compilation consists in ten tracks, including the hit singles "Un-Break My Heart," "Breathe Again," and "You're Makin' Me High", while the other half features songs that were included on her self-titled album (1993), such as "Best Friend" and "Candlelight", and on her fourth studio album "More Than a Woman" (2002), such as "Rock Me, Roll Me" and "Always".

== Critical reception ==
Andy Kellman of Allmusic says, "it's a budget-priced compilation, making it worthwhile for a very small percentage of the singer's most casual fans." However, Kellman complained that, "Instead of 'Another Sad Love Song' or 'He Wasn't Man Enough,' you get 'Candlelight' and 'Always.' This makes no sense." He concluded the review, stating that, "There's no reason why Sony BMG should've formatted the compilation in this manner. It's of no help to anyone."

== Track listing ==
Disc one
No.	Title	Writer(s)	Producer(s)	Length
1.	"Un-Break My Heart"	Diane Warren	David Foster	4:30
2.	"Breathe Again"	Kenneth "Babyface" Edmonds	Babyface; L.A. Reid; Daryl Simmons	4:30
3.	"You're Makin' Me High"	Babyface; Bryce Wilson	Babyface; Wilson	4:28
4.	"You Mean the World to Me"	Babyface; Reid; Simmons	Babyface; Reid; Simmons	4:56
5.	"Best Friend"	Toni Braxton; Vance Taylor	Braxton; Starpoint	4:28
6.	"Candlelight"	John Barnes; Gaylor D	Babyface; Reid; Simmons	4:40
7.	"Spanish Guitar"	Warren	Foster	4:50
8.	"Maybe"	Braxton; Keith Crouch; Samuel Gause; Mechalie Jamison; John Smith	Crouch	3:10
9.	"Rock Me, Roll Me"	Tamar Braxton; Toni Braxton; Keri Lewis	Lewis	4:58
10.	"Always"	Tamar Braxton; Toni Braxton; Blake English; Kenisha Pratt; Brady Smith; Robert "Big Bert" Smith	Smith	4:29

== Charts ==
"Breathe Again: Toni Braxton at Her Best" charted at number 84 on the U.S. Billboard Top R&B Albums.

Chart (2001)	Peak position
U.S. Billboard Top R&B Albums	84
