= Unbreak My Heart (disambiguation) =

"Un-Break My Heart" is a 1996 song by Toni Braxton.

Unbreak My Heart may also refer to:

- Un-Break My Heart: The Remix Collection, a 2005 remix album
- Toni Braxton: Unbreak My Heart, a 2016 film
- Unbreak My Heart (TV series), a 2023 Philippine television series
