= Artist Collection =

Artist Collection may refer to:

- Artist Collection: Luther Vandross
- Artist Collection: Rick Astley
- Artist Collection: Toni Braxton
- Artist Collection (Kylie Minogue album)
