= Christmas in Jamaica =

Single by Toni Braxton featuring Shaggy

from the album Snowflakes
- B-side: "Snowflakes of Love"
- Released: December 8, 2001
- Studio: KL Productions (Atlanta, Georgia); Big Yard Studios (New York City, New York)
- Genre: R&B; Christmas
- Length: 4:22
- Label: Arista
- Songwriter(s): Toni Braxton; Donnie Scantz; Keri Lewis; Orville Burrell; Craig Love; Dave Kelly
- Producer(s): Toni Braxton; Keri Lewis; Donnie Scantz; Shaggy (co.)

Toni Braxton singles chronology
"Snowflakes of Love" (2001)	"Christmas in Jamaica" (2001)	"Hit the Freeway" (2002)

"Christmas in Jamaica" is a song recorded by American R&B singer Toni Braxton. It was written by Braxton along with her former husband Keri Lewis, Donnie Scantz, Craig Love, Dave Kelly and Shaggy, for her first Christmas album, Snowflakes (2001), with Braxton, Lewis and Scantz producing the song and Shaggy co-producing and having featured vocals. The song was released as the album's second and final single on December 8, 2001, by Arista Records. Following the previous single "Snowflakes of Love", the island-flavored Christmas song charted at number three on the US Billboard Bubbling Under R&B/Hip-Hop Singles chart, but failed to chart elsewhere. The song was issued without a music video.

== Commercial performance ==
On January 5, 2002, the song peaked at number three on Billboard's Bubbling Under R&B/Hip-Hop Singles chart, In total the song spent a total of three weeks on the chart.

== Formats and track listings ==
- US Promo CD single
1. "Christmas in Jamaica" (Remix) - 3:39
2. "Christmas in Jamaica" (Radio Edit) - 4:01
3. "Christmas in Jamaica" (Remix Instrumental) - 3:38
4. "Christmas in Jamaica" (Radio Edit Instrumental) - 4:00
- Europe CD Single
1. "Christmas In Jamaica" (feat. Shaggy)- 4:01
2. "Christmas In Jamaica" (Remix) (feat. Shaggy)- 3:39
3. "Snowflakes of Love" - 4:06

== Charts ==
Chart (2002)	Peak position
Netherlands (Dutch Top 40 Tipparade)	22
US Bubbling Under R&B/Hip-Hop Singles (Billboard)	3

== Release history ==
Region	Date	Format	Label	Ref
United States	2001	CD	Arista Records	
Europe	2001	CD	Arista Records	
