= I Love Me Some Him =

- US CD maxi-single; US standard CD single uses different background color

Single by Toni Braxton

from the album Secrets
- A-side: "I Don't Want To"
- B-side: "Un-Break My Heart" (Billboard Award Show Version)
- Released: March 11, 1997
- Recorded: 1996
- Studio: Middle Ear Studio (Miami Beach, FL)
- Genre: R&B
- Length: 5:09
- Label: LaFace
- Songwriters: Andrea Martin, Gloria Stewart, Kenneth Karlin, Carsten Schack
- Producer: Soulshock & Karlin

Toni Braxton singles chronology
"Un-Break My Heart" (1996)	"I Don't Want To" / "I Love Me Some Him" (1997)	"How Could an Angel Break My Heart" (1997)

"I Love Me Some Him" is a song by American R&B singer Toni Braxton from her second studio album, Secrets (1996). Written by Andrea Martin and Gloria Stewart and produced by the Danish duo Soulshock & Karlin, the song was released as the flipside to the album's third single, "I Don't Want To", solely in the United States, while international versions of "I Don't Want To" did not include "I Love Me Some Him".

"I Love Me Some Him" was a major R&B airplay hit during the course of 1997, reaching the top position of Billboard's R&B/Hip-Hop Airplay chart, and while there was no music video filmed for it, it has become one of Braxton's most requested singles. As such, it was included on her 2003 singles collection Ultimate Toni Braxton.

== Track listings and formats ==
U.S. double A-side CD single with "I Don't Want To" / Cassette Single

1. "I Don't Want To" (Album Version) – 4:17
2. "I Love Me Some Him" (Album Version) – 5:09

U.S. double A-side CD maxi single with "I Don't Want To"

1. "I Don't Want To" (Album Version) – 4:17
2. "I Don't Want To" (Frankie Knuckles Club Mix) – 10:57
3. "I Don't Want To" (Instrumental) – 4:19
4. "I Love Me Some Him" (Album Version) – 5:09
5. "Un-Break My Heart" (Billboard Award Show Version) – 4:12

== Charts ==
=== Weekly charts ===
Weekly chart performance for "I Love Me Some Him"
Chart (1997)	Peak position
US Billboard Hot 100 with "I Don't Want To"	19
US Dance Singles Sales (Billboard) with "I Don't Want To"	2
US Hot R&B/Hip-Hop Songs (Billboard) with "I Don't Want To"	9
US Pop Airplay (Billboard) with "I Don't Want To"	28
US Rhythmic Airplay (Billboard) with I Don't Want To"	33

=== Year-end charts ===
Year-end chart performance for "I Love Me Some Him"
Chart (1997)	Position
US Billboard Hot 100	59
