= Secrets (Toni Braxton album) =

Studio album by Toni Braxton
- Released: June 18, 1996
- Recorded: January 1995 – May 1996
- Studios: LaCoCo (Atlanta) (Note: Track 1); Bosstown (Atlanta); The Record Plant (Hollywood) (Note: Tracks 2–4, 6–9 and 12); DARP (Atlanta) (Note: Track 2); The Tracken Place (Beverly Hills, California) (Note: Tracks 3, 6–9 and 12); Ocean Way (Hollywood) (Note: Tracks 3, 6 and 12); Chartmaker (Malibu, California) (Note: Track 4); Studio 56 (Hollywood) (Note: Track 5); The Hit Factory (New York City) (Note: Tracks 6 and 8); Middle Ear (Miami Beach, Florida) (Note: Track 10)
- Genre: R&B
- Length: 54:56
- Labels: LaFace; Arista
- Producers: Babyface; Keith Crouch; David Foster; R. Kelly; L.A. Reid; Tony Rich; Soulshock & Karlin; Bryce Wilson

Toni Braxton chronology
Toni Braxton (1993)	Secrets (1996)	The Heat (2000)

Singles from Secrets
- 1. "You're Makin' Me High"/"Let It Flow" Released: May 21, 1996; 2. "Un-Break My Heart" Released: October 7, 1996; 3. "I Don't Want To"/"I Love Me Some Him" Released: March 11, 1997; 4. "How Could an Angel Break My Heart" Released: October 21, 1997

Secrets is the second studio album by American singer Toni Braxton, released on June 18, 1996, by LaFace Records and Arista Records. The album was nominated for Best Pop Album at the 1997 Grammy Awards. Secrets has been certified eight-times platinum by the Recording Industry Association of America (RIAA). Worldwide, the album has sold over 15 million copies. In support of the album, Braxton embarked on the Secrets Tour, playing dates in North America and Europe from August 1996 to October 1997.

== Composition ==
The album's first song "Come On Over Here" is a "finger-poppingly upbeat", sultry groove track produced by Tony Rich. It was described as "a neo-Motown composition". The second track and lead single, the airily funky "You're Makin' Me High", was produced by Babyface and Bryce Wilson. It was also nominated for a Grammy Award for Best R&B Song. The third track "There's No Me Without You" is a romantic song. The fourth track and second single "Un-Break My Heart" is a ballad written by Diane Warren. Warren played the finished song to Arista Records president Clive Davis, who thought it would be perfect for Braxton. With background vocals by Shanice Wilson and production by David Foster, the song spent 11 weeks at number one on pop radio stations and 14 weeks at number one on adult contemporary radio in late 1996. It also won a Grammy Award for Best Female Pop Vocal Performance in 1997. It is a song of blistering heartbreak, as Braxton sings to her former lover, begging him to return to her and undo all the pain he has caused. The fifth track "Talking in His Sleep" is about adultery.

The sixth track "How Could an Angel Break My Heart" was co-written by Babyface and Braxton and features saxophonist Kenny G. Over a "lulling" ballad melody, the lyrics detail a lover's wayward behavior. "Let It Flow", included on the soundtrack to Waiting to Exhale, eventually became a staple of urban contemporary radio. The song is a sultry tune that requires the singer to reach down to her lowest register. On "Why Should I Care", Braxton ascends to a high, breathy croon, while on "I Don't Want To", R. Kelly provides the soft bump-and-grind sound, in a song about a romance in denial, and "I Love Me Some Him" was written by Andrea Martin and Gloria Stewart and produced by Soulshock & Karlin.

== Singles ==
The album's lead single, "You're Makin' Me High", earned Braxton her first number-one single on both the Billboard Hot 100 and the Billboard Hot R&B/Hip-Hop Songs charts. Its B-side, "Let It Flow", was an airplay success and was featured on the soundtrack to the 1995 film Waiting to Exhale. The second single, "Un-Break My Heart", became a commercial success worldwide, peaking at number one on the Hot 100 for 11 consecutive weeks, number one on the Hot Dance Club Play, and number two on the Hot R&B/Hip-Hop Songs, while topping the charts in several other countries. The third single from the album, "I Don't Want To", reached the top 20 of the Hot 100 and the top 10 of the R&B chart. Its B-side, "I Love Me Some Him", was a major airplay success domestically. The fourth official single, "How Could an Angel Break My Heart", which features Kenny G on the saxophone, became another top-40 entry in the United Kingdom, while failing to enter the charts in the US.

== Critical reception ==
Professional ratings
Review scores
Source	Rating
AllMusic	4.5/5 stars
Entertainment Weekly	A−
Los Angeles Times	3/4 stars
Muzik	3.5/5 stars
The Philadelphia Inquirer	3/4 stars
Pitchfork	8.0/10
The Rolling Stone Album Guide	4/5 stars
Spin	7/10
USA Today	4/4 stars
The Village Voice	A−

Secrets received generally positive reviews from music critics. Stephen Thomas Erlewine from AllMusic wrote that Braxton's "vocal talent is what unites Secrets and makes it into a first-rate contemporary R&B collection. Braxton is a singer who can cross over into the smooth confines of adult contemporary radio without losing or betraying the soul that lies at the foundation of her music, and her talent burns at its brightest on Secrets." Ken Tucker of Entertainment Weekly praised the "core Braxton/Babyface collaborations" on the album as "diverse, witty, and exquisitely modulated", noting Braxton's "technical range" and "ability to deliver Secrets' sermons of sensuality—little gospels of good and bad loving—with unusual eloquence." Robert Christgau, writing in The Village Voice, stated, "The apprentice diva of the debut was modest, composed, virtually anonymous. I'll take the right It Girl anytime—especially one who insists on getting her props." David Fricke from Rolling Stone commented, "As designer champagne 'n' anguish R&B goes, Secrets goes down nice and easy."

== Commercial performance ==
Secrets debuted at number two on the Billboard 200 (behind Metallica's Load) and at number one on the Top R&B/Hip-Hop Albums chart, selling 170,000 copies in its first week. The album was certified eight-times platinum by the Recording Industry Association of America (RIAA) on October 3, 2000, and as of April 2011, it had sold 5,364,000 copies in the United States, according to Nielsen SoundScan. It sold an additional 927,000 copies through BMG Music Club. In Canada, the album peaked at number four on RPM's albums chart, and was certified septuple platinum by the Canadian Recording Industry Association (CRIA) on December 31, 1997, denoting shipments in excess of 700,000 units.

The album debuted at number 54 on the UK Albums Chart for the week ending June 29, 1996, before peaking at number 10 in its 30th week on the chart, on January 25, 1997. On April 1, 1997, the British Phonographic Industry (BPI) certified Secrets double platinum for shipments of over 600,000 copies. In continental Europe, the album topped the charts in Denmark, the Netherlands, Norway, and Switzerland, while reaching the top five in Austria, Belgium, Finland, Germany, and Sweden, and the top 10 in Ireland. In Oceania, the album reached number 11 in both Australia and New Zealand; it has been certified double platinum by the Australian Recording Industry Association (ARIA) and gold by the Recording Industry Association of New Zealand (RIANZ). By May 2010, Secrets had sold 15 million copies worldwide.

== Track listing ==
No.	Title	Lyrics	Music	Producer(s)	Length
1.	"Come On Over Here"	Tony Rich; Marc Nelson; Darrell Spencer	Rich	Rich; L.A. Reid	3:36
2.	"You're Makin' Me High"	Babyface; Bryce Wilson	Babyface; Wilson	Babyface; Wilson	4:26
3.	"There's No Me Without You"	Babyface	Babyface	Babyface	4:19
4.	"Un-Break My Heart"	Diane Warren	Warren	David Foster	4:30
5.	"Talking in His Sleep"	Toni Braxton	Keith Crouch	Crouch	5:33
6.	"How Could an Angel Break My Heart"	Babyface; Braxton	Babyface; Braxton	Babyface	4:20
7.	"Find Me a Man"	Babyface	Babyface	Babyface	4:27
8.	"Let It Flow"	Babyface	Babyface	Babyface	4:21
9.	"Why Should I Care"	Babyface	Babyface	Babyface	4:25
10.	"I Don't Want To"	R. Kelly	Kelly	Kelly	4:17
11.	"I Love Me Some Him"	Soulshock & Karlin; Andrea Martin; Gloria Stewart	Soulshock & Karlin	Soulshock & Karlin	5:09
12.	"In the Late of Night" (includes hidden track "Toni's Secrets" at 5:19)	Babyface; Jonathan Buck	Babyface; Buck	Babyface	5:33
Total length:					54:56

Japanese edition, Brazilian platinum edition, and international special edition bonus tracks
No.	Title	Lyrics	Music	Producer(s)	Length
13.	"You're Makin Me High" (T'empo Mix)	Babyface; Wilson	Babyface; Wilson	Babyface; Wilson; Tim Lennow^{[a]}^{[b]}; Andrew Clough^{[a]}^{[b]}; Colin Thorpe^{[a]}^{[b]}	4:13
14.	"Un-Break My Heart" (Classic Radio Mix)	Warren	Warren	Foster; Frankie Knuckles^{[c]}; Satoshi Tomiie^{[a]}	4:27
15.	"I Don't Want To" (Frankie Knuckles Radio Edit)	Kelly	Kelly	Kelly; Knuckles^{[a]}^{[b]}; Tomiie^{[a]}	3:56

Latin American edition bonus track
No.	Title	Lyrics	Music	Producer(s)	Length
13.	"Regresa a Mi" ("Un-Break My Heart" Spanish version)	Warren; Marco Flores	Warren	Foster; K. C. Porter^{[b]}	4:30

20th Anniversary bonus tracks – disc one
No.	Title	Lyrics	Music	Producer(s)	Length
13.	"Toni's Secret" (Interlude)	Braxton		Braxton	0:15
14.	"Un-Break My Heart" (Frankie Knuckles Classic Radio Mix)	Warren	Warren	Foster; Knuckles; Tomiie	4:27
15.	"I Don't Want To" (Frankie Knuckles Radio Edit)	Kelly	Kelly	Knuckles	4:17
16.	"You're Makin' Me High" (Classic Edit)	Babyface; Wilson	Babyface; Wilson; David Morales	Babyface; Wilson; Morales	3:35
17.	"How Could an Angel Break My Heart" (Cuca True Radio Edit)	Babyface	Babyface	DJ Cuca	4:08
18.	"You're Makin' Me High" (Radio Edit)	Babyface; Wilson	Babyface; Wilson	Babyface; Wilson	4:07
19.	"Un-Break My Heart" (Diva Mix)	Warren	Warren	Foster	5:18

20th Anniversary – disc two
No.	Title	Lyrics	Music	Producer(s)	Length
1.	"You're Makin' Me High" (Classic Dub)	Babyface; Wilson	Babyface; Wilson	Morales	6:12
2.	"Un-Break My Heart" (Spanish Version)	Warren; Flores	Warren	Foster; Porter	4:17
3.	"How Could an Angel Break My Heart" (Remix Version)	Babyface; Braxton	Babyface; Braxton	Babyface	4:20
4.	"I Don't Want To" (Dance Extended Mix)	Kelly	Kelly	Knuckles	5:50
5.	"You're Makin' Me High" (Classic Mix)	Babyface; Wilson	Babyface; Wilson	Morales	9:41
6.	"I Don't Want To" (Classic Club Mix)	Kelly	Kelly	Knuckles; Tomiie	10:54
7.	"Un-Break My Heart" (Soul Hex Anthem Vocal)	Warren	Warren	Soul Solution; Hex Hector	9:31
8.	"You're Makin' Me High" (Tempo's Private Club Mix)	Babyface; Wilson	Babyface; Wilson	Adam Clough; Tim Lennox; Colin Thorpe	8:50
9.	"I Don't Want To" (Disco Radio)	Kelly	Kelly	Knuckles; Tomiie	3:59
10.	"You're Makin' Me High" (Groove Remix)	Babyface; Wilson	Babyface; Wilson	Morales	4:34
11.	"How Could an Angel Break My Heart" (Cuca True Club Mix)	Babyface; Braxton	Babyface; Braxton	DJ Cuca	6:12
12.	"You're Makin' Me High" (Instrumental)	Babyface; Wilson	Babyface; Wilson	Babyface; Wilson	4:27

=== Notes ===
- ^{^[a]} signifies an additional producer
- ^{^[b]} signifies a remixer
- ^{^[c]} signifies a remix producer

== Personnel ==
Credits adapted from the liner notes of Secrets.

=== Musicians ===
- Toni Braxton – lead vocals, background vocals (tracks 1, 2, 4, 5, 7, 9–11); all vocals (tracks 3, 6, 8, 12); vocal arrangement (track 5)
- Tony Rich – arrangement, all instruments, background vocals (track 1)
- Marc Nelson – background vocals (tracks 1, 2, 9)
- Shanice Wilson – background vocals (tracks 1, 4)
- Randy Walker – MIDI programming (tracks 2, 3, 6–9, 12)
- Bryce Wilson – drum programming, keyboard programming (track 2)
- Babyface – keyboards (tracks 2, 3, 6, 7–9, 12); guitar (tracks 2, 8); background vocals (tracks 2, 7, 9); drum programming (tracks 3, 6, 7, 9, 12); acoustic guitar, electric guitar (tracks 3, 9); synthesizers (track 8)
- Chanté Moore – background vocals (tracks 2, 7, 9)
- Jakkai Butler – background vocals (track 2)
- Reggie Hamilton – bass (track 3)
- Luis Conte – percussion (tracks 3, 7, 12)
- Jeremy Lubbock – string arrangement, string conducting (tracks 3, 6, 12)
- David Foster – arrangement, keyboard programming (track 4)
- Simon Franglen – Synclavier programming (track 4)
- Dean Parks – acoustic guitar (track 4)
- Michael Thompson – electric guitar (track 4); guitar (track 12)
- L.A. Reid – background vocal arrangement (track 4)
- Tim Thomas – background vocal arrangement (track 4)
- Keith Crouch – arrangement, B3 organ, all other instruments, vocal arrangement (track 5)
- Sherree Ford-Payne – background vocals (track 5)
- Greg Phillinganes – piano (tracks 6, 7, 12); Rhodes (track 6)
- Nathan East – bass (tracks 6, 12)
- Kenny G – saxophone (tracks 6, 12)
- Reggie Griffin – guitar (track 8)
- R. Kelly – arrangement, background vocals, all instruments (track 10)
- Soulshock & Karlin – arrangement (track 11)
- Andrea Martin – background vocals (track 11)

=== Technical ===
- Tony Rich – production (track 1)
- L.A. Reid – production (track 1); executive production
- NealHPogue – recording (track 1)
- Leslie Brathwaite – recording (track 1)
- John Frye – recording assistance (track 1)
- Jon Gass – mixing (tracks 1, 3, 7, 8, 11, 12)
- Babyface – production (tracks 2, 3, 6–9, 12); executive production
- Bryce Wilson – production (track 2)
- Brad Gilderman – recording (tracks 2, 3, 6–9, 12)
- Russell Elevado – recording (track 2)
- Paul Boutin – recording assistance (tracks 2, 3, 6–9, 12)
- Robbes Stieglitz – recording assistance (tracks 2, 3, 6–9, 12)
- Bryan Reminic – recording assistance (track 2)
- "Bassy" Bob Brockmann – mixing (tracks 2, 9)
- Kyle Bess – recording assistance (tracks 3, 6–8, 12)
- Brandon Harris – recording assistance (tracks 3, 4, 6, 7, 12)
- Richard Huredia – recording assistance (tracks 3, 6, 12)
- Ivy Skoff – production coordination (tracks 3, 6–9, 12)
- David Foster – production (track 4)
- Felipe Elgueta – recording (track 4)
- Mick Guzauski – mixing (track 4)
- Marnie Riley – mixing assistance (track 4)
- Keith Crouch – production, recording (track 5)
- Eugene Lo – recording (track 5)
- Booker T. Jones III – mixing (track 5)
- Jin Choi – recording assistance (track 6)
- Jon Shrive – recording assistance (track 6)
- Bill Kinsley – recording assistance (track 6)
- Brad Haehnel – recording assistance (track 6)
- Al Schmitt – string engineering (track 6)
- Glen Marchese – recording assistance (track 8)
- Larry Schalit – recording assistance (track 8)
- R. Kelly – production, mixing (track 10)
- Peter Mokran – recording, mixing (track 10)
- John Merchant – recording assistance (track 10)
- Frank Gonzales – recording assistance (track 10)
- Ron Lowe – mixing assistance (track 10)
- Soulshock & Karlin – production (track 11)
- Manny Marroquin – recording (track 11)
- Dave Reitzas – string engineering (track 12)
- Herb Powers Jr. – mastering
- Toni Braxton – executive production

=== Artwork ===
- Toni Braxton – creative direction
- Davett Singletary – art direction
- D.L. Warfield – design
- Nigel Sawyer – design assistance
- Randee St. Nicholas – photography

== Charts ==
=== Weekly charts ===
Weekly chart performance for Secrets
Chart (1996–1997)	Peak position
Australian Albums (ARIA)	11
Austrian Albums (Ö3 Austria)	2
Belgian Albums (Ultratop Flanders)	4
Belgian Albums (Ultratop Wallonia)	6
Canada Top Albums/CDs (RPM)	4
Canadian Albums (Billboard)	5
Danish Albums (Hitlisten)	1
Dutch Albums (Album Top 100)	1
European Albums (Music & Media)	3
Finnish Albums (Suomen virallinen lista)	3
French Albums (SNEP)	22
German Albums (Offizielle Top 100)	2
Greek Albums (IFPI)	2
Hungarian Albums (MAHASZ)	5
Icelandic Albums (Tónlist)	5
Irish Albums (IFPI)	7
Italian Albums (FIMI)	15
Japanese Albums (Oricon)	65
Malaysian Albums (RIM)	7
New Zealand Albums (RMNZ)	11
Norwegian Albums (VG-lista)	1
Portuguese Albums (AFP)	3
Scottish Albums (Official Charts)	27
Spanish Albums (AFYVE)	25
Swedish Albums (Sverigetopplistan)	2
Swiss Albums (Schweizer Hitparade)	1
Taiwanese International Albums (IFPI)	2
UK Albums (Official Charts)	10
UK R&B Albums (Official Charts)	2
US Billboard 200	2
US Top R&B/Hip-Hop Albums (Billboard)	1

=== Year-end charts ===
1996 year-end chart performance for Secrets
Chart (1996)	Position
Canada Top Albums/CDs (RPM)	11
Dutch Albums (Album Top 100)	12
European Albums (Music & Media)	46
German Albums (Offizielle Top 100)	65
Swedish Albums & Compilations (Sverigetopplistan)	25
UK Albums (OCC)	26
US Billboard 200	23
US Top R&B/Hip-Hop Albums (Billboard)	9

1997 year-end chart performance for Secrets
Chart (1997)	Position
Australian Albums (ARIA)	36
Austrian Albums (Ö3 Austria)	11
Belgian Albums (Ultratop Flanders)	19
Belgian Albums (Ultratop Wallonia)	30
Canadian Albums (SoundScan)	23
Canadian R&B Albums (SoundScan)	2
Dutch Albums (Album Top 100)	10
European Albums (Music & Media)	5
German Albums (Offizielle Top 100)	9
Norwegian Albums (VG-lista)	9
Swedish Albums & Compilations (Sverigetopplistan)	51
Swiss Albums (Schweizer Hitparade)	6
UK Albums (OCC)	28
US Billboard 200	9
US Top R&B/Hip-Hop Albums (Billboard)	14

1998 year-end chart performance for Secrets
Chart (1998)	Position
Canadian R&B Albums (SoundScan)	58

2000 year-end chart performance for Secrets
Chart (2000)	Position
Finnish Albums (Suomen virallinen lista)	110

=== Decade-end charts ===
Decade-end chart performance for Secrets
Chart (1990–1999)	Position
US Billboard 200	51

=== All-time charts ===
All-time chart performance for Secrets
Chart	Position
US Billboard 200 (Women)	72

== Certifications and sales ==
Certifications and sales for Secrets
Region	Certification	Certified units/sales
Australia (ARIA)	2× Platinum	140,000^{^}
Austria (IFPI Austria)	Platinum	50,000^{*}
Belgium (BRMA)	Platinum	50,000^{*}
Brazil	—	400,000
Canada (Music Canada)	7× Platinum	700,000^{^}
Finland (Musiikkituottajat)	Gold	35,227
France (SNEP)	Gold	100,000^{*}
Germany (BVMI)	Platinum	500,000^{^}
Iceland	—	2,802
Japan (RIAJ)	Platinum	200,000^{^}
Netherlands (NVPI)	2× Platinum	200,000^{^}
New Zealand (RMNZ)	Gold	7,500^{^}
Norway (IFPI Norway)	Platinum	50,000^{*}
Poland (ZPAV)	Platinum	100,000^{*}
Spain (Promusicae)	Gold	50,000^{^}
Sweden (GLF)	Platinum	100,000^{^}
Switzerland (IFPI Switzerland)	2× Platinum	100,000^{^}
United Kingdom (BPI)	2× Platinum	600,000^{^}
United States (RIAA)	8× Platinum	6,291,000 (Note: As of April 2011, Secrets had sold 5,364,000 copies in the United States according to Nielsen SoundScan, with an additional 927,000 sold at BMG Music Club. Nielsen SoundScan does not count albums sold through clubs like the BMG Music Service, which were significantly popular in the 1990s.)
Summaries
Europe (IFPI)	3× Platinum	3,000,000^{*}
Worldwide	—	15,000,000
^{*} Sales figures based on certification alone.^{^} Shipments figures based on certification alone.

== Release history ==
Release dates and formats for Secrets
Region	Date	Format	Edition	Label	Ref.
United States	June 18, 1996	CD	Standard	LaFace; Arista	
Germany	June 24, 1996	CD	Standard	BMG	
Japan	July 10, 1996	CD	Standard	BMG	
United Kingdom	July 15, 1996	CD; LP; cassette	Standard	Arista	
United Kingdom	July 1, 2016	CD	20th Anniversary	Funkytowngrooves	
Japan	July 20, 2016	CD	20th Anniversary	Solid	
