= Snowflakes of Love =

Single by Toni Braxton

from the album Snowflakes
- Released: November 13, 2001
- Studio: Studio A Recording (Dearborn Heights, Michigan); Abbey Road Studios (London, England); KL Productions (Atlanta, Georgia)
- Genre: Pop; Christmas
- Length: 4:24
- Label: Arista
- Songwriter(s): Toni Braxton; Keri Lewis; Isaac Hayes
- Producer(s): Toni Braxton; Keri Lewis

Toni Braxton singles chronology
| "Maybe" (2001) | "Snowflakes of Love" (2001) | "Christmas in Jamaica" (2001) |

"Snowflakes of Love" is a song recorded by American R&B singer Toni Braxton. Written and produced by Braxton and her then-husband Keri Lewis, it also samples the instrumental of Earl Klugh's "Now We're One", leading to the song's writer, Isaac Hayes, getting a co-writer's credit on this track. The track first impacted US urban adult contemporary radio on November 13, 2001, as the lead single to Braxton's fourth studio album and first Christmas album, Snowflakes (2001) via Arista Records.

The track did not have much success, only hitting number 25 on the US Adult Contemporary chart. No video was made for the song.

== Commercial performance ==
On January 5, 2002, the song peaked at number twenty-five on the Adult Contemporary chart. The song spent a total of one week on the chart.

== Formats and track listings ==
US CD single
| No. | Title | Length |
|---|---|---|
| 1. | "Snowflakes of Love" | 4:06 |
| 2. | "Snowflakes of Love" (Instrumental) | 4:06 |

== Credits and personnel ==
Album credits taken from Discogs.

Performers and musicians

- Toni Braxton – vocals, background vocals

Technical personnel

- Ashley Alexander - engineering assistant
- Antonio "LA" Reid - executive producer
- Craig Taylor - engineering mixing assistant
- Darren Goodwin - engineering assistant
- Dave Palmer - recording, mixing
- Don Sebesky - arrangement, conductor
- Keri Lewis - executive producer, mixing, producer
- Randy Poole – engineering assistant
- Toni Braxton - executive producer, producer

== Charts ==
| Chart (2002) | Peak position |
|---|---|
| US Adult Contemporary (Billboard) | 25 |

== Release history ==
Release dates and formats for "Snowflakes of Love"
| Region | Date | Format | Label | Ref |
|---|---|---|---|---|
| United States | November 13, 2001 | Urban adult contemporary radio | Arista Records | |
| United States | December 3, 2001 | Adult contemporary radio | Arista Records | |
