= Just Be a Man About It =

2000 single by Toni Braxton

Single by Toni Braxton

from the album The Heat
- Released: June 19, 2000
- Studio: Noontime (Atlanta, Georgia)
- Length: 4:50 (album version); 4:10 (radio edit)
- Label: LaFace; Arista
- Songwriters: Toni Braxton; Johntá Austin; Teddy Bishop; Bryan-Michael Cox
- Producer: Teddy Bishop

Toni Braxton singles chronology
"He Wasn't Man Enough" (2000)	"Just Be a Man About It" (2000)	"Spanish Guitar" (2000)

Music video
- "Toni Braxton - Just Be A Man About It (Official Video)" on YouTube

"Just Be a Man About It" is a song by American singer Toni Braxton from her third studio album, The Heat (2000). It was released on June 19, 2000, as the album's second single.

== Background ==
"Just Be a Man About It" is a telephone breakup song, where Braxton questions the status of a partner's manhood and Dr. Dre plays the wayward lover breaking the news to her. According to producer Teddy Bishop, Martin Lawrence and Will Smith were originally considered to perform the speaking parts of the song. However, due to scheduling conflicts, it never happened. Dr. Dre was asked to appear on the song due to being in the studio next door while the song was being recorded.

== Critical reception ==
The song received mostly positive reviews from music critics. Stephen Thomas Erlewine from AllMusic called it "an instant classic" and picked it one of the best songs of the album, alongside "He Wasn't Man Enough" and "Spanish Guitar". CD Universe wrote that "[e]ven Dr. Dre's guest appearance on 'Just Be a Man About It' nods to the sensual recitatives and bedside manners of '70s love men like Barry White." Bog Roget wrote for Amazon that Braxton "delivers a tough take on reality with 'Just Be a Man About It,' which pits her against Dr. Dre in a breakup scenario that carries much more force than weightless trifles".

== Music video ==
The music video for "Just Be a Man About It", directed by Bille Woodruff, opens with Braxton's boyfriend (played by rapper Dr. Dre, who also provides additional vocals to the track) leaving a Hawthorne, California, strip club named Bare Elegance, accompanied by a woman. He stops at a payphone to call up Braxton, who is in their apartment. She looks happy at first, but as he tells her not to wait up for him that night alleging he needs space, her facial expression suddenly changes. The following scenes show Braxton wandering about the apartment, talking on the phone, standing next to the balcony, lying on a couch, and throwing objects such as vases and a picture frame containing a photo of Dre. At one point, Dre hangs up on Braxton, which infuriates her. Toward the end of the video, a man (Q-Tip) shows up to visit Braxton; they hug each other and proceed to cuddle on the couch, much to Dre's annoyance by the time he arrives home. When Dre questions Braxton about the man, she remains indifferent, causing him to give her the finger and leave.

== Track listing ==
- DVD single
1. "Just Be a Man About It" (music video)
2. "Spanish Guitar" (music video)

== Charts ==
=== Weekly charts ===
Weekly chart performance for "Just Be a Man About It"
Chart (2000)	Peak position
Canada (Nielsen SoundScan)	34
US Billboard Hot 100	32
US Hot R&B/Hip-Hop Songs (Billboard)	6
US Rhythmic Airplay (Billboard)	36

=== Year-end charts ===
2000 year-end chart performance for "Just Be a Man About It"
Chart (2000)	Position
US Hot R&B/Hip-Hop Singles & Tracks (Billboard)	24

2001 year-end chart performance for "Just Be a Man About It"
Chart (2001)	Position
Canada (Nielsen SoundScan)	180

== Release history ==
Release dates and formats for "Just Be a Man About It"
Region	Date	Format	Label(s)	Ref.
United States	June 19, 2000	Urban radio	LaFace; Arista	
United States	June 20, 2000	Urban adult contemporary radio	LaFace; Arista	
United States	November 21, 2000	DVD single	LaFace; Arista	
France	February 27, 2001	DVD single	BMG	
