= I Don't Want To =

1997 single by Toni Braxton

- Artwork for US CD maxi-single. US CD single and non-US releases use this artwork with different background color; non-US releases omit "I Love Me Some Him" on the front cover

Single by Toni Braxton

from the album Secrets
- B-side: "I Love Me Some Him"
- Released: March 7, 1997
- Recorded: May 1996
- Studio: Middle Ear (Miami Beach, Florida)
- Genre: R&B
- Length: 4:17
- Label: LaFace
- Songwriter: R. Kelly
- Producer: R. Kelly

Toni Braxton singles chronology
"Un-Break My Heart" (1996)	"I Don't Want To" / "I Love Me Some Him" (1997)	"How Could an Angel Break My Heart" (1997)

Music video
- "I Don't Want To'" on YouTube

"I Don't Want To" is a song recorded by American R&B singer Toni Braxton for her second studio album, Secrets (1996). It was released as the third single from the album on March 7, 1997; in the United States it was released as a double A-side with "I Love Me Some Him". Written and produced by R. Kelly, the R&B ballad describes the agony of a break-up. The song was well received by music critics, who were complimentary about Kelly's production.

The single reached the top-ten in Iceland, Ireland and the United Kingdom, and the top-twenty in six countries, including Canada and the United States, where it shot to number 19 on the Billboard Hot 100 and number nine on the Billboard Hot R&B Singles chart in mid-1997. It became Braxton's third consecutive chart-topper on the Billboard Dance Club Play chart in July 1997, following "You're Makin' Me High" and "Un-Break My Heart".

The accompanying music video was shot during a hectic time in Braxton's career. After the commercial success from the preceding singles and co-headlining a tour with Kenny G, Braxton was exhausted. The time schedule for a video was roughly one day for director Bille Woodruff. A simple video featured Braxton wandering around in a white room wearing a white tanktop, blue jeans and a built up shoe.

== Composition ==
"I Don't Want To" was written and produced by R. Kelly, who was also responsible for all instruments, background vocals and mixing. Braxton provided both lead and background vocals. It was recorded at Middle Ear Studio, Miami Beach, Florida. According to the sheet music published at Musicnotes.com by Universal Music Publishing Group, "I Don't Want To" is written in the key of B major with a moderate tempo of 109 beats per minute. Braxton's vocal range spans from the low note of F3 to the high note of G4. It follows in the chord progression of B–B9-G♯7sus4-G♯7–C♯m-C♯m(maj7)-C♯m7-F♯7. The midtempo R&B ballad talks about the agony of heartbreak. It also touches upon themes of loss and abstinence.

== Critical reception ==
Stephen Thomas Erlewine of AllMusic praised R. Kelly's composition, noting that he "demonstrate[s] why [he is] considered [one] of the top songwriters in '90s R&B and soul." Larry Flick of Billboard magazine praised its groove, which according to him, "is masterfully woven by R. Kelly," adding: "He smartly keeps the musical melodrama to a minimum, opting instead for a smooth and subtle jeep-soul setting that leaves plenty of room for La B to flex her rich vocal range. A reviewer from Music Week rated the song three out of five, complimenting it as "another surefire hit ballad" from the Secrets album. The magazine's Alan Jones described it as "another stately ballad performed with grace and style. Braxton is A Real Singer, but prefers to take the most direct route between two notes, unlike many of her ability. Another monster hit." David Fricke of Rolling Stone also praised Kelly, noting that "the unruffled tenor of the music, however, puts the focus squarely on Braxton, and she's up to it." He described the song as "a quiet groan of loss and abstinence." Ian Hyland from Sunday Mirror gave it eight out of ten, commenting, "Another aching soul-searcher from the most beautiful woman in America. It should be almost as successful as 'Un-Break My Heart' but it's a bit too slow for a dance remix. Not that anyone cares about the song anyway - we just want to see her in that video." David Sinclair from The Times declared it as a "plush power ballad" from the soul diva, and "a guaranteed smash." Richard Harrington from The Washington Post wrote, "With a slow, deliberate pulse and anguished mood reminiscent of 'Breathe Again', it stirs the ashes of emotional burnout for someone who is taking separation as hard as it can be taken."

== Release and commercial performance ==
"I Don't Want To" was released as the album's third single on March 7, 1997. In the United States, the song was released as a double A-side with "I Love Me Some Him". On March 31, 1997, the song was released in the United Kingdom. Commercially, "I Don't Want To" proved to be moderately successful in the United States, reaching number 19 on the US Billboard Hot 100 while peaking at number nine on the Billboard Hot R&B Singles chart. The song also became her third consecutive chart-topper on the Billboard Dance Club Play chart in July 1997, following "You're Makin' Me High" and "Un-Break My Heart". In the United Kingdom, "I Don't Want To" became Braxton's third consecutive top-ten single from Secrets, peaking at number nine. In New Zealand, the song debuted at number 31, and two weeks later climbed to number 21, becoming its peak position. In Sweden, the song debuted at number 57, climbing to number 29 in the second week. Two weeks later, the song peaked at number 15, falling on the two following weeks until it climbed to its peak position once again. It later remained for further six weeks on the charts.

== Music video ==
The accompanying music video for the song was directed by Bille Woodruff and shot on March 4, 1997. The video was filmed during a hectic time in Braxton's career, and after the commercial success from the preceding singles and co-headlining a tour with Kenny G, Braxton was exhausted and it was shot in one day. The video was considered simple, featuring Braxton wandering around in a white room wearing a white tanktop, blue jeans and a built up shoe. The original treatment for the video was a one-take version. Woodruff told MTV News that he shot multiple takes and at the end of the day, the best version would be picked. The video had Braxton walking around a house, trying on various wigs and scrubbing her feet in a bathtub. However, Braxton made a "creative decision to scrap the first shoot in favor of a simpler, non-bathroom video," after MTV News staff mentioned while interviewing Braxton that Jewel, Tony Rich, and No Doubt had recently used bathrooms as music video backdrops (in "Who Will Save Your Soul", "Nobody Knows", and "Just a Girl" respectively).

The video for "I Don't Want To" was published on Braxton's official YouTube channel in October 2009. It has amassed more than 54 million views as of October 2025.

== Track listings and formats ==
- US double A-side CD single and cassette single with "I Love Me Some Him"
1. "I Don't Want To" (Album Version) – 4:17
2. "I Love Me Some Him" (Album Version) – 5:09
- US double A-side CD maxi single with "I Love Me Some Him"
1. "I Don't Want To" (Album Version) – 4:17
2. "I Don't Want To" (Frankie Knuckles Club Mix) – 10:57
3. "I Don't Want To" (Instrumental) – 4:19
4. "I Love Me Some Him" (Album Version) – 5:09
5. "Un-Break My Heart" (Billboard Award Show Version) – 4:12
- UK CD 1
1. "I Don't Want To" (Album Version) – 4:15
2. "I Don't Want To" (Frankie Knuckles Radio Edit) – 4:17
3. "You're Makin' Me High" (Hot Ice Dancehall Mix featuring Mad Cobra) – 4:50
4. "I Don't Want To" (Franktified Club Mix) – 10:57
- UK CD 2
1. "I Don't Want To" (Album Version) – 4:15
2. "I Don't Want To" (Classic Club Mix) – 10:54
3. "I Don't Want To" (Deep Jays Delight) – 9:02

- European CD single
1. "I Don't Want To" (Album Version) – 4:15
2. "I Don't Want To" (Frankie Knuckles Radio Edit) – 4:17
3. "I Don't Want To" (Franktified Club Mix) – 10:57

== Charts ==
=== Weekly charts ===
Chart (1997)	Peak position
Austria (Ö3 Austria Top 40)	11
Belgium (Ultratop 50 Flanders)	16
Belgium (Ultratop 50 Wallonia)	13
Canada (Nielsen SoundScan) with "I Love Me Some Him"	13
Canada Top Singles (RPM)	38
Europe (Eurochart Hot 100)	23
Germany (GfK)	37
Iceland (Íslenski Listinn Topp 40)	7
Ireland (IRMA)	10
Israel (Israeli Singles Chart)	10
Netherlands (Dutch Top 40)	33
Netherlands (Single Top 100)	41
New Zealand (Recorded Music NZ)	21
Scottish Singles Sales (Official Charts)	9
Sweden (Sverigetopplistan)	15
UK Singles (Official Charts)	9
UK Hip Hop/R&B (Official Charts)	2
US Billboard Hot 100 with "I Love Me Some Him"	19
US Adult Contemporary (Billboard)	4
US Dance Club Songs (Billboard)	1
US Dance Singles Sales (Billboard) with "I Love Me Some Him"	2
US Hot R&B/Hip-Hop Songs (Billboard) with "I Love Me Some Him"	9
US Pop Airplay (Billboard)	28
US Rhythmic Airplay (Billboard)	33

=== Year-end charts ===
Chart (1997)	Position
Belgium (Ultratop 50 Flanders)	96
Belgium (Ultratop 50 Wallonia)	59
Brazil Airplay (Crowley)	15
Romania (Romanian Top 100)	49
US Billboard Hot 100	59
US Adult Contemporary (Billboard)	24
US Hot R&B Singles (Billboard)	33

== Certifications ==
Region	Certification	Certified units/sales
Belgium (BRMA)	Gold	25,000^{*}
United States (RIAA)	Gold	600,000
^{*} Sales figures based on certification alone.

== Release history ==
Region	Date	Format(s)	Label(s)	Ref.
United States	February 25, 1997	Rhythmic contemporary; contemporary hit radio	LaFace	
United States	March 7, 1997	Commercial	LaFace	
Sweden	April 21, 1997	CD	LaFace; Arista; BMG	
United Kingdom	May 12, 1997	CD; cassette	LaFace; Arista; BMG	
Japan	June 4, 1997	CD	BMG	

== See also ==
- List of number-one dance singles of 1997 (U.S.)
