= Snowflakes (album) =

Studio album by Toni Braxton
- Released: October 23, 2001
- Recorded: 2000–2001
- Studios: KL Productions (Atlanta) (Note: Tracks 1, 2 and 5; vocals on tracks 3 and 7); Big Yard (New York City) (Note: Shaggy's vocals on track 2); Studio A (Dearborn Heights, Michigan) (Note: Track 3); Abbey Road (London); Silent Sound (Atlanta) (Note: Tracks 4 and 8); Signet (Los Angeles) (Note: Strings on tracks 5 and 7; orchestra on track 10); The Tracken Place (Beverly Hills, California) (Note: Track 8); The Record Plant (Hollywood) (Note: Track 8; strings on track 8); Doppler (Atlanta) (Note: Track 9)
- Genres: Christmas; R&B
- Length: 43:33
- Label: Arista
- Producers: Babyface; Toni Braxton; Keri Lewis; L.A. Reid; Donnie Scantz; Daryl Simmons

Toni Braxton chronology
The Heat (2000)	Snowflakes (2001)	More Than a Woman (2002)

Singles from Snowflakes
- 1. "Snowflakes of Love" Released: November 10, 2001; 2. "Christmas in Jamaica" Released: December 8, 2001

Snowflakes is the fourth studio album by American singer and songwriter Toni Braxton, released on October 23, 2001, by Arista Records. Her first Christmas album, it is a follow-up to her 2000 studio album The Heat. Snowflakes consists of 11 tracks, featuring five R&B-led original songs co-penned with her former husband Keri Lewis and longtime collaborator Babyface, as well as several remixes and cover versions of Christmas standards and carols, one of which is a collaboration with Jamaican musician Shaggy. Throughout the creation process, Braxton also collaborated with L.A. Reid, Poke & Tone, Daryl Simmons and her younger sister Tamar Braxton.

The album received mixed reviews from critics, many of whom compared its nature to Braxton's other work but found the stylized production and original material too contemporary to conjure images of Christmas. Upon its release, Snowflakes debuted at number 119 on the US Billboard 200, and at number 57 on Billboard's Top R&B/Hip-Hop Albums chart. While it remains her lowest-charting album as of 2018, it eventually earned a gold certification by the Recording Industry Association of America (RIAA). Singles such as "Snowflakes of Love" and "Christmas in Jamaica" became a minor success on the adult contemporary charts.

== Critical reception ==
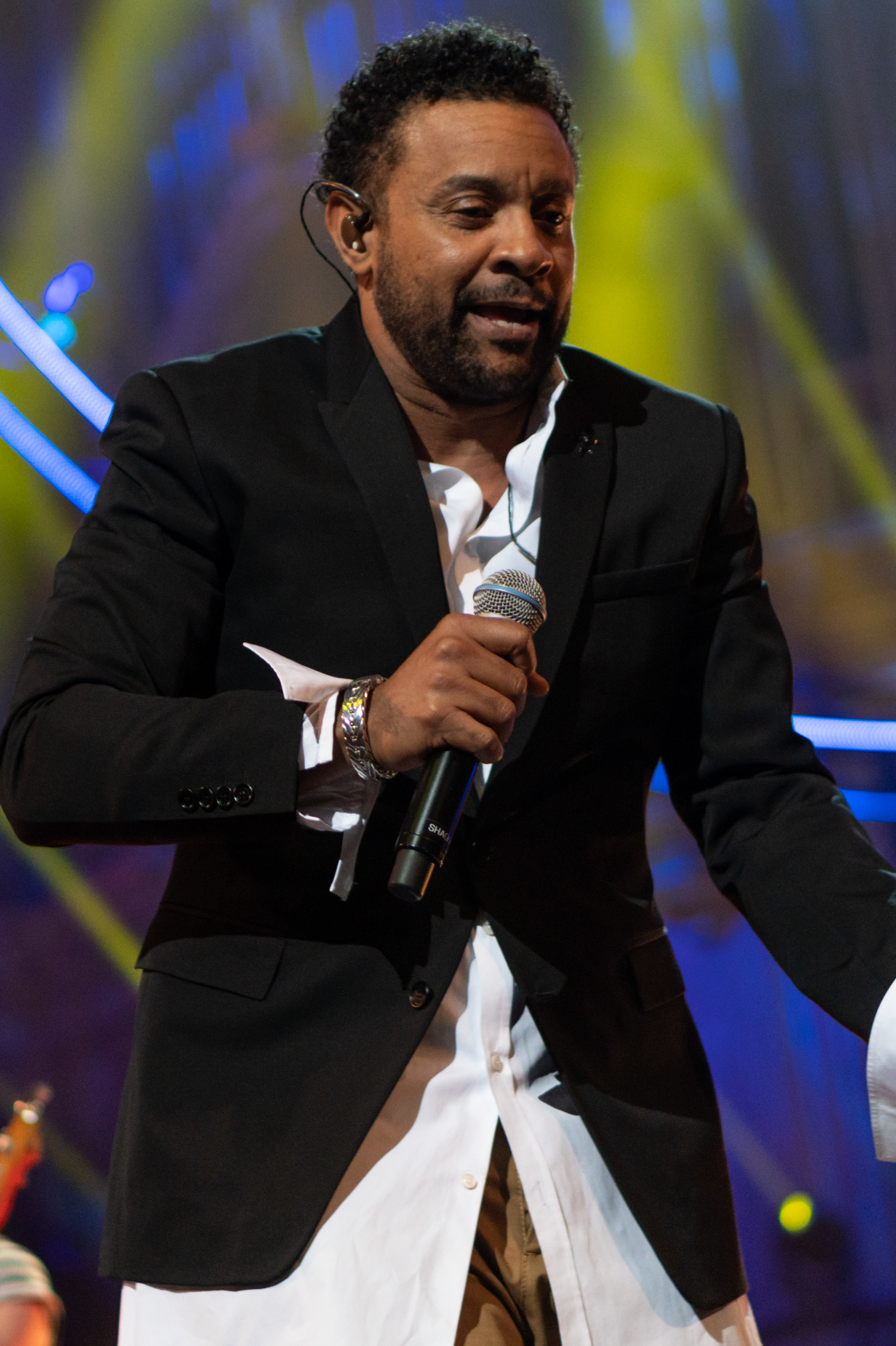
Jamaican musician Shaggy appears on the album's second single, "Christmas in Jamaica".

Professional ratings
Review scores
Source	Rating
AllMusic	3/5 stars
Entertainment Weekly	C+
Rolling Stone	Favorable
The Rolling Stone Album Guide	2/5 stars
Slant Magazine	1.5/5 stars

AllMusic editor Stephen Thomas Erlewine found Snowflakes to be "something that's very similar to a proper Toni Braxton record, only with an appropriately hushed tone and the sultriness replacing the overt sexiness. Some of the originals are pretty good [...] and the rest that don't make much of an impact are nevertheless pleasant and add to the mood. And that pretty much summarizes the record – it's not remarkable, but it's nice, providing a nice, romantic soundtrack for an evening of cuddling in front of the tree and a roaring fire." Rolling Stone critic K.G. Roth called Snowflakes a "Christmas album that is sometimes cozy, often seductive and always strictly R&B. New songs [...] ooze with the same languid, lush vocals and mellow, hip-swiveling beats that pervade Braxton's other work. Even the standards [...] get glazed with Braxton's sensuality. Her smooth alto lingers on each note and nearly reinvents the classic. A little bit naughty and a whole lot of nice, Snowflakes encourages listeners put the mistletoe to good use this year."

In a less impressed review for Entertainment Weekly, Chris Willmann wrote: "Ever since Elvis sang 'Santa Bring My Baby Back (To Me),' singers have assumed that Saint Nick has nothing better to do than find their ex-lovers and give 'em a ride back to their bereft apartments on Christmas Eve. Toni Braxton picks up the thread on [...] Snowflakes. Braxton needs to work harder at getting her man back herself: She sounds uncharacteristically wan here, frequently drowned out by powerful string arrangements. Alexa Camp from Slant Magazine felt that "like Carey wouldn't be able to pull off another pristine Christmas album at this skanky stage in her career, Braxton's Snowflakes would have worked better pre-'You're Makin' Me High'." Highly critical with "the excruciatingly banal" lead single "Christmas in Jamaica", she noted that "there's nary a festive note in original songs like 'Santa Please' and 'Holiday Celebrate' [...] More classic-sounding tunes [...] lift the collection's spirit, but (call me old-fashioned) faithful renditions of 'Have Yourself a Merry Little Christmas' and 'The Christmas Song' are the only moments that conjure images of Christmas."

== Commercial performance ==
In the United States, Snowflakes peaked at number 119 on the Billboard 200 in its fifth week on chart. It also reached number 57 on the Top R&B/Hip-Hop Albums chart and number five on the Top Holiday Albums chart. The album was certified gold by the Recording Industry Association of America (RIAA) on November 28, 2001, and sold 243,000 according to Nielsen soundscan. Elsewhere, Snowflakes debuted and peaked at number 92 on the German Albums Chart, making it the only country outside the United States to chart.

Two singles were released from the album. "Snowflakes of Love", which samples the instrumental of Earl Klugh's "Now We're One", written by Isaac Hayes for the soundtrack to the 1974 film Truck Turner, served as the album's lead single. The song peaked at number 25 on Billboard's Adult Contemporary chart on January 5, 2002. The remix version of "Christmas in Jamaica" featuring Jamaican musician Shaggy was released as the second and final single in 2001. The song reached number three on the Billboard Bubbling Under R&B/Hip-Hop Singles chart, while failing to chart elsewhere.

== Track listing ==
No.	Title	Writer(s)	Producer(s)	Length
1.	"Holiday Celebrate"	Toni Braxton; Keri Lewis; Tamar Braxton	Lewis; Toni Braxton	3:59
2.	"Christmas in Jamaica" (featuring Shaggy)	Toni Braxton; Donnie Scantz; Lewis; Orville Burrell; Craig Love; Dave Kelly	Lewis; Toni Braxton; Scantz; Shaggy^{[a]}; Love^{[b]}	4:23
3.	"Snowflakes of Love"	Toni Braxton; Lewis; Isaac Hayes	Lewis; Toni Braxton	4:25
4.	"Christmas Time Is Here"	Vince Guaraldi; Lee Mendelson	Daryl Simmons; Toni Braxton^{[a]}	4:11
5.	"Santa Please..."	Toni Braxton; Lewis	Lewis; Toni Braxton	4:33
6.	"...Pretty Please" (Interlude)			1:01
7.	"Have Yourself a Merry Little Christmas"	Ralph Blane; Hugh Martin	Lewis; Toni Braxton	4:35
8.	"This Time Next Year"	Babyface; David Foster; Toni Braxton	Simmons; Babyface; Toni Braxton^{[a]}	4:23
9.	"The Christmas Song"	Mel Tormé; Robert Wells	L.A. Reid; McArthur^{[a]}	3:23
10.	"Snowflakes of Love" (Brent Fischer Instrumental)	Toni Braxton; Lewis; Hayes	Lewis; Toni Braxton	4:37
11.	"Christmas in Jamaica" (Remix) (featuring Shaggy)	Toni Braxton; Scantz; Lewis; Burrell; Love; Kelly	Lewis; Toni Braxton; Scantz; Shaggy^{[a]}; Poke & Tone^{[b]}^{[c]}	3:39

=== Notes ===
- ^{^[a]} signifies a co-producer
- ^{^[b]} signifies an additional producer
- ^{^[c]} signifies a remixer

=== Sample credits ===
- "Snowflakes of Love" contains elements and samples from "Now We're One" by Earl Klugh.

== Charts ==
Chart performance for Snowflakes
Chart (2001–2003)	Peak position
German Albums (Offizielle Top 100)	92
US Billboard 200	119
US Top Holiday Albums (Billboard)	5
US Top R&B/Hip-Hop Albums (Billboard)	57

== Certifications ==
Certifications for Snowflakes
Region	Certification	Certified units/sales
United States (RIAA)	Gold	500,000^{^}
^{^} Shipments figures based on certification alone.

== Release history ==
Release dates and formats for Snowflakes
Region	Date	Format	Label	Ref.
United States	October 21, 2001	CD; cassette	Arista	
