= BMG Heritage Records =

BMG Heritage Records was the record label of the BMG Strategic Marketing Group reissue division of Sony BMG Music Entertainment which handled the reissue of recordings first issued on the RCA Victor, Arista, Buddah, Windham Hill and Jive Records (when BMG bought Zomba in 2003), as well as other labels BMG or predecessor companies acquired over the years. It was founded in November 2001 and formally established on January 1, 2002 as the successor company to the Buddha Records reissue label. In 2005, Sony BMG folded BMG Heritage into Legacy Recordings.

== See also ==
- List of record labels
