= The Heat (Toni Braxton album) =

Studio album by Toni Braxton
- Released: April 25, 2000
- Recorded: 1999–2000
- Studios: Larrabee North (Universal City, California) (Note: Track 1); The Village Recorder (Los Angeles) (Note: Tracks 2 and 9); The Point (Saint Paul, Minnesota) (Note: Tracks 2, 8 and 9); Flyte Tyme (Edina, Minnesota) (Note: Tracks 2, 8 and 9); Chartmaker (Malibu, California) (Note: Tracks 3 and 6); Noontime (Atlanta) (Note: Tracks 4 and 11); Brandon's Way (Los Angeles) (Note: Tracks 5 and 7); Human Rhythm (Los Angeles) (Note: Track 10); Music Grinder (Hollywood) (Note: Strings on track 10); Silent Sound (Atlanta) (Note: Track 12)
- Genres: R&B; pop
- Length: 48:35
- Label: LaFace
- Producers: Teddy Bishop; Keith Crouch; David Foster; Jazze Pha; Rodney "Darkchild" Jerkins; Keri; Daryl Simmons; Toni Braxton

Toni Braxton chronology
Secrets (1996)	The Heat (2000)	Snowflakes (2001)

Singles from The Heat
- 1. "He Wasn't Man Enough" Released: February 29, 2000; 2. "Just Be a Man About It" Released: June 20, 2000; 3. "Spanish Guitar" Released: September 11, 2000; 4. "Maybe" Released: February 6, 2001

The Heat is the third studio album by American singer Toni Braxton, released on April 25, 2000, by LaFace Records. The album marked Braxton's departure from her ballads in favor of a more urban sound. Most of the songs (including the nearly instrumental "The Art of Love") were written and produced by Braxton and her husband Keri Lewis (a former member of Mint Condition); two ballads were penned by Diane Warren, and collaborations featured rappers Dr. Dre and Lisa "Left Eye" Lopes.

The Heat opened at number two on the Billboard 200 with 199,000 copies sold in its first week. It was certified double platinum by the Recording Industry Association of America (RIAA) on October 13, 2000, with sales of over two million copies in the United States. Additionally, the album was nominated for Best R&B Album at the 2001 Grammy Awards, while lead single "He Wasn't Man Enough" won Best Female R&B Vocal Performance and was nominated for Best R&B Song.

== Background and production ==
After the success of her second studio album, Secrets (1996), which spawned Braxton's signature song and biggest commercial success of her career, "Un-Break My Heart", and sold over 15 million copies worldwide, Braxton filed a suit to be released from her contract with Arista and LaFace Records in Los Angeles Superior Court, citing a law that states employers may not enforce labor or service after seven years. After a year of legal issues, Braxton settled her lawsuit with LaFace Records, with plans to release a new album in May 1999.

In February 1999, Babyface told MTV News, "We're getting ready head back in the studio with Braxton and we've got everything worked out, and we're really excited about getting back into the studio, getting back to the music." However, only in January 2000, during an interview with CNN, Braxton revealed that the album was going to be released in March 2000, while stating, "Some of the producers on the album are, of course Babyface, R. Kelly, David Foster, Keith Crouch and Keri Lewis of Mint Condition, just to name a few", while also revealing collaborations with Lisa "Left Eye" Lopes from TLC and Dr. Dre.

== Music and lyrics ==
"The Heat" is built on solid ballads and smoldering, mid-tempo dance numbers, as noted by AllMusic's Stephen Thomas Erlewine. Colin Ross of PopMatters noted that, "By taking a more active role in the writing and production of the set, Toni's material begins to be constructed around her voice rather than the latest producer's sound."

The album's first single and opening track, "He Wasn't Man Enough", was written and produced by Rodney Jerkins. The R&B song, with synth-funk bassline and Jerkins' taut beats and harp, has Braxton warning a female friend not to marry a man the singer knows all too well and that came back begging for forgiveness. On the title track, "The Heat", co-written by Keri Lewis, was described as "an infectious mid-tempo groove." Lyrically, the song talks about wanting to "get it on" and enjoying coed skinny-dipping. Third track, "Spanish Guitar", was written by Diane Warren (who wrote "Un-Break My Heart") and was considered a "latin ballad", inspired by "Un-Break My Heart". Lyrically, the song has the singer inviting an alluring stranger to play her "through the night" like a "Spanish Guitar." The fourth track "Just Be a Man About It" is a telephone breakup song, with Braxton once again questioning the status of a partner's manhood and Dr. Dre playing the wayward lover breaking the news to her, while the fifth track, "Gimme Some", features Lisa "Left Eye" Lopes and was named "an R&B/summer 'jerky funker' track", with Braxton demanding intercourse and oral sex from a man; the music track for "Gimme Some" was originally used for the demo "Can't Do It Alone" by singer Aaliyah, but she decided not to use it.

"I'm Still Breathing" is another song written by Diane Warren and talks about a woman stung by a painful breakup who summons strength, while "Fairy Tale", co-written and produced by Babyface, is an "acoustic piece" where the singer implies that being "just friends" may be healthier than a "love affair." Pillow talk and ecstatic moaning characterize "The Art of Love", a track that features no discernible lyrics, Braxton's sighs and moans over undulating rhythms". On "Speaking in Tongues", a "sensual affair" with warm harmonies, spiritual expressions are co-opted and woven amid passionate propositions including, "Talk dirty to me." The tenth track "Maybe" has rapid-fire lyrics, informed by hip-hop vocal rhythms and lyrically discuss the singer debating —in rapturous detail— whether or not to have drinks and sex again with her boyfriend ("Should I give him some/Will he make me hot/Will he hit the spot I love a lot", she sings). The eleventh track "You've Been Wrong" was considered "plodding", while the twelfth and final track, "Never Just For a Ring", finds Braxton questioning her lovers lack of fidelity the song features the embittered choral hook "Why?, when?, where?, how?, who?, what?", made you go off and do this crazy thing.

== Singles ==
The album's lead single, "He Wasn't Man Enough", was released on March 17, 2000, to critical acclaim, and won a Grammy Award for Best Female R&B Vocal Performance. It was also a success on the charts, where it peaked at number two on the Billboard Hot 100 chart and topped the Hot R&B/Hip-Hop Singles & Tracks. Elsewhere, it topped the Canadian Singles Chart, while reaching the top 10 in Australia, New Zealand, Netherlands, Sweden, Switzerland and the United Kingdom. The album's second single in the US was the song "Just Be a Man About It". It reached number 36 on the Billboard Hot 100 and number six on the Hot R&B/Hip-Hop Singles & Tracks.

Outside of the US, "Spanish Guitar" was released as the album's second single on September 11, 2000. Initially, LaFace Records did not release it as a single due to the promotion of "Just Be a Man About It". It achieved moderate success on the charts around the world, reaching the top 40 in Austria, Belgium, Netherlands and Switzerland. In the US, when it was released as the album's third single, "Spanish Guitar" only managed to reach number 98 on the Billboard Hot 100, number 20 on the Adult Contemporary and topped the Dance Music/Club Play Singles. The album's final single, "Maybe", achieved minor success on the R&B and dance charts, due to the cancelled racy video.

== Critical reception ==
Professional ratings
Review scores
Source	Rating
AllMusic	4/5 stars
Entertainment Weekly	B+
The Guardian	3/5 stars
MTV Asia	7/10
PopMatters	7/10
Q	4/5 stars
Rolling Stone	3/5 stars

The Heat received mixed to positive reviews from most music critics. Stephen Thomas Erlewine of AllMusic described the album as "a confident, assured, sexy effort that reaffirms Braxton's status as one of the finest contemporary mainstream soul singers." He praised the singles "He Wasn't Man Enough", "Spanish Guitar", and "Just Be a Man About It", noting that while "The Heat slightly runs out of momentum toward the end, there aren't many dull spots on the record -- it's all stylish, sultry, seductive, appealing urban contemporary soul that confirms Braxton's prodigious talents." Barry Walters of Rolling Stone wrote that the album "updates and diversifies her stylistic surroundings while delivering the expected boudoir soundtrack," adding that "Braxton radiates sublimely sensual romance" throughout. Jim Farber of Entertainment Weekly called the album "tasteful, well-performed, and – best of all – consistent stuff, throwing the lovelorn a reliable lifeline."

Collin Ross of PopMatters described the album as "a mixed bag," but acknowledged that "despite being largely formulaic, The Heat offers some moments of quality." He also expressed hope that the Keri Lewis/Braxton collaborations would play a more substantial role on her next album. People noted that "much of the material on The Heat never rises to the heights of previous hits like "Breathe Again" and "Love Shoulda Brought You Home"," singling out "The Art of Love" as a standout track that is "sinewy and seductive" and showcases Braxton's mature elegance. Evelyn Tan of MTV Asia felt that while Braxton's vocals remained strong, the album "suffered from a lack of energy and originality," with many songs feeling bland or run-of-the-mill despite top-tier producers; only tracks like "Gimme Some," "Maybe," and "Just Be a Man About It" provided notable variety. Bob Waliszewski of Plugged In observed that Braxton has a "sultry knack for conveying romantic agony," but cautioned that on this album she sometimes seems "about to explode from repressed erotic intensity," recommending listeners "better turn down The Heat."

=== Accolades ===
At the 43rd Annual Grammy Awards, the album's lead single, "He Wasn't Man Enough", was nominated for Best R&B Song and eventually won a Grammy Award for Best Female R&B Vocal Performance, while the album itself was nominated for Best R&B Album. Braxton was also nominated for Best R&B/Soul Album, Female at the 2001 Soul Train Music Awards, but lost to Who Is Jill Scott?: Words and Sounds Vol. 1 by Jill Scott. Braxton won two American Music Awards for Favorite Soul/R&B Female Artist and Favorite Soul/R&B Album (The Heat).

== Commercial performance ==
The Heat debuted at number two on the Billboard 200, selling 199,000 copies in its first week. It debuted at number one on the magazine's Top R&B/Hip-Hop Albums chart, while the album's lead single, "He Wasn't Man Enough", held onto the top spot of the Hot R&B/Hip-Hop Songs chart for the second week in a row. In its third week, the album fell to number seven with 101,000 copies sold. The Heat was certified double platinum by the Recording Industry Association of America (RIAA), and as of April 2011, it had sold 2,093,000 copies in the US, according to Nielsen Soundscan.

The album topped the Canadian Albums Chart, while it reached number three on the UK Albums Chart, staying 19 weeks on the latter. The album also reached the top 10 in many countries, such as Austria, Belgium, France, Germany, the Netherlands, Norway, Sweden and Switzerland. As of December 2002, the album had sold four million copies worldwide.

== Track listing ==
No.	Title	Writer(s)	Producer(s)	Length
1.	"He Wasn't Man Enough"	Rodney Jerkins; Fred Jerkins III; LaShawn Daniels; Harvey Mason Jr.	Rodney "Darkchild" Jerkins; LaShawn "Big Shiz" Daniels^{[a]}	4:21
2.	"The Heat"	Keri Lewis; Toni Braxton	Keri; Braxton	3:30
3.	"Spanish Guitar"	Diane Warren	David Foster	4:47
4.	"Just Be a Man About It"	Braxton; Johntá Austin; Teddy Bishop; Bryan-Michael Cox	Bishop; Braxton^{[b]}; Cox^{[b]}	4:50
5.	"Gimme Some" (featuring Lisa "Left Eye" Lopes)	Jazze Pha; Braxton; Babyface; Lopes	Babyface; Jazze Pha; Braxton^{[b]}	4:03
6.	"I'm Still Breathing"	Warren	Foster	4:15
7.	"Fairy Tale"	Marc Harris; Tommy Sims; Babyface	Babyface	4:22
8.	"The Art of Love"	Braxton; Lewis	Lewis; Braxton	3:47
9.	"Speaking in Tongues"	Braxton	Lewis; Braxton	3:46
10.	"Maybe"	Braxton; Keith Crouch; John Smith; Mechallie Jamison; Samuel Gause	Crouch; Braxton^{[b]}	3:08
11.	"You've Been Wrong"	Braxton; Brian Casey; Brandon Casey; Bishop; Kevin Hicks; Thom Bell; Linda Creed	Bishop; Hicks^{[b]}	3:45
12.	"Never Just for a Ring"	Daryl Simmons; Braxton; Pure Soul	Simmons	4:01
Total length:				48:35

=== Notes ===
- ^{^[a]} signifies a vocal producer
- ^{^[b]} signifies a co-producer

=== Sample credits ===
- "You've Been Wrong" contains re-sung elements from "Stop, Look, Listen (To Your Heart)" written by Thom Bell and Linda Creed.

== Personnel ==
Credits adapted from the liner notes of The Heat.

=== Musicians ===
- Toni Braxton – lead vocals (tracks 1–7, 9–12); background vocals (tracks 1, 2, 4, 5, 7–12); arrangement (tracks 2, 8–10); vocal arrangements (tracks 4, 10, 11); keyboards (track 9)
- Rodney Jerkins – arrangement, background vocals, all instruments (track 1)
- Fred Jerkins III – arrangement (track 1)
- LaShawn Daniels – arrangement (track 1)
- Nora Payne – background vocals (track 1)
- Sharlotte Gibson – background vocals (track 1)
- Keri – arrangement, all instruments (tracks 2, 8, 9)
- David Foster – arrangement, keyboards (tracks 3, 6)
- Simon Franglen – Synclavier programming (track 3)
- Dean Parks – guitars (track 3); acoustic guitars (track 6)
- Andrés de Léon – background vocals (track 3)
- Sue Carwell – background vocals (tracks 3, 6)
- Felipe Elgueta – Spanish lyrics adaptation (track 3); synth programming (track 6)
- Teddy Bishop – drum programming, keyboards, vocal arrangements (tracks 4, 11); all instruments (track 4); all other instruments (track 11)
- Debra Killings – background vocals (track 4)
- Sara Martin – background vocals (track 4)
- Dr. Dre – additional vocals (track 4)
- Johntá Austin – vocal arrangements (track 4)
- Babyface – keyboards (tracks 5, 7); guitar, vocoder (track 5); drum programming, acoustic guitar, background vocals (track 7)
- Jazze Pha – drum programming (track 5)
- Nathan East – bass (tracks 5, 7)
- Greg Phillinganes – piano (tracks 5, 7)
- Sherree Ford-Payne – background vocals (tracks 5, 10)
- Lisa "Left Eye" Lopes – rap (track 5)
- Chris Jennings – drum programming (track 6)
- Michael Thompson – electric guitars (track 6)
- Keith Crouch – arrangement, vocal arrangements, all other instruments (track 10)
- John Smith – guitar (track 10)
- Benjamin Wright – string arrangements, string conducting (track 10)
- Charles Veal Jr. – concertmaster (track 10)
- South Central Chamber Orchestra – strings (track 10)
- Kevin Hicks – guitar (track 11)
- Tamar Braxton – background vocals (track 11)
- Trina Braxton – background vocals (tracks 11, 12)
- Towanda Braxton – background vocals (tracks 11, 12)
- Brian Casey – vocal arrangements (track 11)
- Brandon Casey – vocal arrangements (track 11)
- Ray Edwards – keyboards (track 12)
- Dorian "Soul Dog" Daniels – keyboards, bass (track 12)
- Daryl Simmons – keyboards, background vocals (track 12)
- Tony Williams – drum programming (track 12)
- Pamela Cork – additional (bridge) background vocals (track 12)
- Tamecia Simpson – additional (bridge) background vocals (track 12)

=== Technical ===
- Rodney "Darkchild" Jerkins – production, mixing (track 1)
- Harvey Mason Jr. – recording, Pro Tools (track 1)
- Steve Baughman – recording assistance (track 1)
- Dexter Simmons – mixing (track 1)
- Tyson Leeper – mixing assistance (track 1)
- Roger Lopez – mixing assistance (track 1)
- LaShawn "Big Shiz" Daniels – vocal production (track 1)
- Keri – production, mixing (tracks 2, 8, 9); recording (tracks 8, 9)
- Toni Braxton – production (tracks 2, 8, 9); co-production (tracks 4, 5, 10); album production
- Claude Achille – recording (track 2)
- Xavier "X-Man" Smith – recording assistance (tracks 2, 8); mixing assistance (tracks 2, 8, 9)
- Michael Zainer – recording assistance (track 2)
- Steve Hodge – mixing (tracks 2, 8, 9)
- Brad Yost – mixing assistance (tracks 2, 9)
- David Foster – production (tracks 3, 6)
- Felipe Elgueta – recording (tracks 3, 6)
- Mick Guzauski – mixing (tracks 3, 6)
- Tom Bender – mixing assistance (tracks 3, 6)
- Teddy Bishop – production (tracks 4, 11)
- Bryan-Michael Cox – co-production (track 4)
- Arnold "AJ" Wolfe – recording (tracks 4, 11)
- Manny Marroquin – mixing (tracks 4, 5, 11, 12)
- Dylan Vaughan – mixing assistance (tracks 4, 11)
- Jazze Pha – production (track 5)
- Babyface – production (tracks 5, 7); album production
- Paul Boutin – recording (tracks 5, 7)
- Victor McCoy – mixing assistance (track 5)
- Ivy Skoff – production coordinator (tracks 5, 7)
- Jon Gass – mixing (track 7)
- E'lyk – mixing assistance (track 7)
- Keith Crouch – production, recording (track 10)
- Reggie Dozier – string recording (track 10)
- Brent Riley – string recording assistance (track 10)
- Booker T. Jones III – mixing (track 10)
- Joe Brown – mixing assistance (track 10)
- Kevin Hicks – co-production (track 11)
- Daryl Simmons – production (track 12)
- Thom "TK" Kidd – recording (track 12)
- Kevin Lively – mixing assistance (track 12)
- Stephanie Vonarx – mixing assistance (track 12)
- Herb Powers Jr. – mastering
- L.A. Reid – album production

=== Artwork ===
- Jeffrey Schulz – design
- Daniela Federici – photography

== Charts ==
=== Weekly charts ===
Weekly chart performance for The Heat
Chart (2000)	Peak position
Australian Albums (ARIA)	14
Austrian Albums (Ö3 Austria)	7
Belgian Albums (Ultratop Flanders)	9
Belgian Albums (Ultratop Wallonia)	9
Canadian Albums (Billboard)	1
Canadian R&B Albums (Nielsen SoundScan)	1
Danish Albums (Hitlisten)	3
Dutch Albums (Album Top 100)	3
European Albums (Music & Media)	2
Finnish Albums (Suomen virallinen lista)	27
French Albums (SNEP)	9
German Albums (Offizielle Top 100)	3
Hungarian Albums (MAHASZ)	26
Irish Albums (IRMA)	15
Italian Albums (FIMI)	18
Japanese Albums (Oricon)	25
New Zealand Albums (RMNZ)	30
Norwegian Albums (VG-lista)	4
Scottish Albums (Official Charts)	24
Singaporean Albums (SPVA)	2
Spanish Albums (AFYVE)	28
Swedish Albums (Sverigetopplistan)	6
Swiss Albums (Schweizer Hitparade)	2
UK Albums (Official Charts)	3
UK R&B Albums (Official Charts)	2
US Billboard 200	2
US Top R&B/Hip-Hop Albums (Billboard)	1

=== Year-end charts ===
Year-end chart performance for The Heat
Chart (2000)	Position
Belgian Albums (Ultratop Flanders)	77
Belgian Albums (Ultratop Wallonia)	45
Canadian Albums (Nielsen SoundScan)	54
Danish Albums (Hitlisten)	84
Dutch Albums (Album Top 100)	45
European Albums (Music & Media)	35
German Albums (Offizielle Top 100)	36
South Korean International Albums (MIAK)	31
Swiss Albums (Schweizer Hitparade)	32
US Billboard 200	41
US Top R&B/Hip-Hop Albums (Billboard)	11

Chart (2001)	Position
Canadian R&B Albums (Nielsen SoundScan)	116

=== Decade-end charts ===
Decade-end chart performance for The Heat
Chart (2000–2009)	Position
US Top R&B/Hip-Hop Albums (Billboard)	53

== Certifications and sales ==
Certifications and sales for The Heat
Region	Certification	Certified units/sales
Australia (ARIA)	Gold	35,000^{^}
Belgium (BRMA)	Gold	25,000^{*}
Brazil (Pro-Música Brasil)	Gold	100,000^{*}
Denmark	—	15,940
France (SNEP)	Gold	100,000^{*}
Germany (BVMI)	Gold	150,000^{^}
Japan (RIAJ)	Gold	100,000^{^}
Netherlands (NVPI)	Gold	40,000^{^}
Switzerland (IFPI Switzerland)	Gold	25,000^{^}
United Kingdom (BPI)	Gold	100,000^{^}
United States (RIAA)	2× Platinum	2,000,000
Summaries
Worldwide	—	4,000,000
^{*} Sales figures based on certification alone.^{^} Shipments figures based on certification alone.
