= How Could an Angel Break My Heart =

1997 single by Toni Braxton

Single by Toni Braxton with Kenny G

from the album Secrets
- Released: October 21, 1997
- Studio: The Record Plant, Ocean Way Recording (Hollywood, California); The Tracken Place (Beverly Hills, California); The Hit Factory (New York City)
- Length: 4:20
- Label: LaFace
- Songwriters: Babyface; Toni Braxton
- Producer: Babyface

Toni Braxton singles chronology
"I Don't Want To" / "I Love Me Some Him" (1997)	"How Could an Angel Break My Heart" (1997)	"He Wasn't Man Enough" (2000)

Music video
- "Toni Braxton - How Could An Angel Break My Heart (Official HD Video)" on YouTube

"How Could an Angel Break My Heart" is a song by American singer and songwriter Toni Braxton, released in October 1997 as the fourth and final single from her second studio album, Secrets (1996). The song, co-written by Braxton and Babyface and produced by Babyface, features Kenny G on the saxophone. At the time of this single's release, Secrets had reached five-time Platinum status by the RIAA.

== Critical reception ==
British magazine Music Week gave "How Could an Angel Break My Heart" three out of five, adding that "Braxton looks to a big ballad to return her to the Top 10 with this fourth radio-friendly cut". In a retrospective review, Pop Rescue described the song as "a-wash with luxurious strings and haunting saxophone, as Toni’s somewhat sad vocals weave their way through this gentle ballad." Richard Harrington from The Washington Post complimented it as a "fine cut".

== Music video ==
A music video was produced to promote the single, directed by Iain Softley. It follows the lyrical content of the relationship between Braxton and her lover. He has left her for another woman and she is left to pick up the pieces.

The remix version of the song has the storyline laid out a little differently, with Babyface singing back to her and duetting with her from the second verse. Babyface's vocals replace Kenny G's saxophone parts.

== Track listings and formats ==
- UK CD 1 and European CD single
1. "How Could an Angel Break My Heart" (Album Version) – 4:20
2. "How Could an Angel Break My Heart" (Remix Version featuring Babyface) – 4:21
3. "How Could an Angel Break My Heart" (Album Instrumental) – 4:21
4. "How Could an Angel Break My Heart" (Remix Instrumental) – 4:21
- UK CD 2
1. "How Could an Angel Break My Heart" – 4:20
2. "Breathe Again" – 4:29
3. "Another Sad Love Song" – 5:01
4. "Love Shoulda Brought You Home" – 4:56

== Personnel ==
Personnel are adapted from album liner notes.

- Toni Braxton: lead vocals, background vocals, writer
- Kenneth "Babyface" Edmonds: writer, producer, keyboards, programming
- Kenny G: saxophone
- Greg Phillinganes: piano, Rhodes
- Nathan East: bass
- Jeremy Lubbock: arrangement and conducting (strings)
- Brad Gilderman: recording
- Al Schmitt: recording (strings)
- Mick Guzauski: mixing
- Paul Boutin, Robbes Stieglietz, Kyle Bess, Brandon Harris: assistant engineering
- Richard Huredia, Jin Choi, Jon Shrive, Bill Kinsley, Brad Haehnel: assistant engineering
- Randy Walker: midi programming
- Ivy Skoff: production coordination

== Charts ==
Chart (1997)	Peak position
Belgium (Ultratop 50 Flanders)	50
Europe (Eurochart Hot 100)	83
Ireland (IRMA)	16
Netherlands (Dutch Top 40)	36
Netherlands (Single Top 100)	34
Scotland Singles (OCC)	37
UK Singles (OCC)	22
UK Hip Hop/R&B (OCC)	5
US Adult Contemporary (Billboard)	12
