= Spanish Guitar (song) =

2000 single by Toni Braxton

Single by Toni Braxton

from the album The Heat
- Released: September 11, 2000
- Recorded: 1999
- Studio: Chartmarker (Los Angeles)
- Genre: Latin pop; R&B
- Length: 4:47
- Label: LaFace; Arista
- Songwriter: Diane Warren
- Producer: David Foster

Toni Braxton singles chronology
"Just Be a Man About It" (2000)	"Spanish Guitar" (2000)	"Maybe" (2001)

Music video
- "Spanish Guitar" on YouTube

"Spanish Guitar" is a song by American singer Toni Braxton from her third studio album, The Heat (2000). It was released on September 11, 2000, as the album's third single by LaFace Records and Arista Records. The song was written by Diane Warren and produced by David Foster. The song reached number 98 on the Billboard Hot 100.

== Critical reception ==
The song received mixed reviews from music critics. Stephen Thomas Erlewine from AllMusic called it "an effective ballad" and picked it one of the best songs of the album, alongside "He Wasn't Man Enough" and "Just Be a Man About It". CD Universe was largely positive, writing that "the appropriately titled 'Spanish Guitar' marks an interruption of the other songs' predominantly electronic textures while remaining consistent with the sensuous, romantic mood." Barry Walters wrote favorably for Rolling Stone, stating that "Braxton's supple alto rests easily within mainstream R&B's smooove sonic furniture, her croons displaying husky quirks as the track goes through the multiplatinum motions on 'Spanish Guitar,' a Latin-conscious 'Un-Break My Heart' clone." Writing for PopMatters Colin Ross called the song is "overly dramatic" and "fairly uninspiring."

== Music video ==
The music video for "Spanish Guitar" opens with Braxton floating on top of the water. The scene quickly changes to a crowded cafe and centers on a man (portrayed by Kamar de los Reyes) playing the guitar. The scene changes to a modern white and red room where Braxton, wearing a red dress, sings her longing to be in his arms. There are several shots of him playing the guitar with the guitar morphing into Braxton in his arms. Towards the end, he and Braxton have a dance scene together. The video ends into a fade-out of Braxton in bed, with a guitar. The video was directed by Billie Woodruff, who also directed the videos for "Un-Break My Heart", "He Wasn't Man Enough", and "Just Be a Man About It".

== Track listings ==
- German and Australian CD maxi single
1. "Spanish Guitar" (radio mix) – 4:30
2. "Spanish Guitar" (Mousse T.'s radio mix) – 4:07
3. "Spanish Guitar" (HQ² radio edit) – 4:11
4. "Spanish Guitar" (Royal Garden Flamenco mix) – 4:35
5. "Spanish Guitar" (Eiffel 65 radio edit) – 4:30
- German and Australian CD maxi single (The Remixes)
1. "Spanish Guitar" (radio mix) – 4:30
2. "Spanish Guitar" (Mousse T.'s extended mix) – 6:53
3. "Spanish Guitar" (HQ² Mix) – 8:54
4. "Spanish Guitar" (Mousse T.'s Deep Vocal mix) – 8:32
5. "Spanish Guitar" (Eiffel 65 extended mix) – 6:54
- German CD single
1. "Spanish Guitar" (radio mix) – 4:20
2. "Spanish Guitar" (Royal Garden's Flamenco mix) – 4:35
- US 12-inch single set

A1. "Spanish Guitar" (HQ² mix) – 8:54
A2. "Spanish Guitar" (HQ² radio edit) – 4:10
B3. "Spanish Guitar" (Mousse T.'s Deep Vocal mix) – 8:32
B4. "Spanish Guitar" (Mousse T.'s radio edit) – 4:02
C5. "Spanish Guitar" (Eiffel 65 extended mix) – 6:54
C6. "Spanish Guitar" (Eiffel 65 TV edit) – 6:53
D7. "Spanish Guitar" (Mousse T.'s extended mix) – 6:53
D8. "Spanish Guitar" (Royal Garden Flamenco mix) – 4:34
D9. "Spanish Guitar" (album version) – 4:25

== Charts ==
=== Weekly charts ===
Chart (2000–2001)	Peak position
Australia (ARIA)	44
Austria (Ö3 Austria Top 40)	28
Belgium (Ultratop 50 Flanders)	46
Belgium (Ultratop 50 Wallonia)	32
Canada Dance/Urban (RPM)	15 (Note: "Spanish Guitar" reached number 15 when RPM ceased publication in November 2000.)
Canada (Nielsen SoundScan)	22
Croatia (HRT)	1
Czech Republic (IFPI)	24
Europe (European Hot 100 Singles)	57
France (SNEP)	37
Germany (GfK)	45
Italy (FIMI)	38
Netherlands (Dutch Top 40)	17
Netherlands (Single Top 100)	19
Poland Airplay (Music & Media)	5
Poland (Polish Airplay Charts)	3
Romania (Romanian Top 100)	12
Sweden (Sverigetopplistan)	49
Switzerland (Schweizer Hitparade)	36
US Billboard Hot 100	98
US Adult Contemporary (Billboard)	20
US Dance Club Songs (Billboard)	1
US Dance Singles Sales (Billboard)	18
US Hot R&B/Hip-Hop Songs (Billboard)	75

=== Year-end charts ===
Chart (2000)	Position
Romania (Romanian Top 100)	94
US Dance Club Play (Billboard)	17

Chart (2001)	Position
Canada (Nielsen SoundScan)	138
US Adult Contemporary (Billboard)	46

== Release history ==
Region	Date	Format(s)	Label(s)	Ref(s).
Australia	September 11, 2000	CD	LaFace; Arista	
Germany	September 25, 2000	CD maxi single; CD maxi single (The Remixes)	LaFace; Arista	
Sweden	September 25, 2000	CD	LaFace; Arista	
Australia	October 3, 2000	CD (The Remixes)	LaFace; Arista	
United States	October 24, 2000	12-inch single	LaFace; Arista	
United States	November 7, 2000	Rhythmic contemporary; urban; urban adult contemporary radio	LaFace; Arista	
