= Maybe (Toni Braxton song) =

2001 single by Toni Braxton

Single by Toni Braxton

from the album The Heat
- Released: January 30, 2001
- Studio: Human Rhythm (Los Angeles); Music Grinder (Hollywood, California)
- Length: 3:08
- Label: LaFace; Arista
- Songwriters: Toni Braxton; Keith Crouch; John Smith; Mechallie Jamison; Samuel Gause
- Producer: Keith Crouch

Toni Braxton singles chronology
"Spanish Guitar" (2000)	"Maybe" (2001)	"Snowflakes of Love" (2001)

"Maybe" is a song by American singer Toni Braxton from her third studio album, The Heat (2000). It was released to urban adult contemporary radio in the United States on January 30, 2001, as the album's fourth and final single.

== Music video ==
The music video for "Maybe", directed by Chris Robinson, remained unreleased as Braxton felt it was too risqué. The treatment saw Braxton arriving home from the 2001 Grammy Awards ceremony after winning the award for Best Female R&B Vocal Performance for "He Wasn't Man Enough". She enters in the infamous dress and begins to undress while a peeper (played by James C. Mathis III) looks in. Although the video was never released, Braxton shows a clip of the never-before-seen video on her DVD From Toni with Love: DVD Collection. A shortened clip featured in a television program was later uploaded onto YouTube with the unreleased video for "The Heat" following it.

== Charts ==
Chart (2001)	Peak position
US Dance Club Songs (Billboard)	11
US Hot R&B/Hip-Hop Songs (Billboard)	74

== Release history ==
Region	Date	Format(s)	Label(s)	Ref.
United States	January 30, 2001	Urban radio	LaFace; Arista	
United States	February 6, 2001	Urban adult contemporary radio	LaFace; Arista	
