= He Wasn't Man Enough =

2000 single by Toni Braxton

Single by Toni Braxton

from the album The Heat
- Released: February 29, 2000
- Recorded: January–February 2000
- Studio: Larrabee North (Universal City, California)
- Genre: R&B
- Length: 4:21
- Label: LaFace; Arista
- Songwriters: Rodney Jerkins; Fred Jerkins III; LaShawn Daniels; Harvey Mason, Jr.
- Producer: Rodney "Darkchild" Jerkins

Toni Braxton singles chronology
"How Could an Angel Break My Heart" (1997)	"He Wasn't Man Enough" (2000)	"Just Be a Man About It" (2000)

Music video
- "He Wasn't Man Enough" on YouTube

"He Wasn't Man Enough" is a song by American singer Toni Braxton. It was written by Rodney "Darkchild" Jerkins, Fred Jerkins III, LaShawn Daniels, and Harvey Mason, Jr. for her third studio album, The Heat (2000), while production was helmed by the former. "He Wasn't Man Enough" is an uptempo R&B song that differs from Braxton's previous ballads. The song was released by LaFace Records on February 29, 2000, as the lead single from the album.

The song received generally positive reviews from music critics, many of whom praised it as one of Braxton's best works. "He Wasn't Man Enough" had international success and became one of Braxton's signature songs, peaking at number two on the Billboard Hot 100, where the single stood for several weeks, and number one on the Hot R&B/Hip-Hop Singles & Tracks chart for four weeks. As of 2025, this song is her last solo top 10 appearance on the Billboard Hot 100. An accompanying music video was released for the single. The song earned Braxton her fourth Grammy Award for Best Female R&B Vocal Performance and was nominated for Best R&B Song in 2001.

== Background and composition ==
"He Wasn't Man Enough" was released as the lead single from Toni Braxton's third studio album, The Heat. The song was written by Rodney Jerkins, Fred Jerkins III, LaShawn Daniels, and Harvey Mason, Jr., while it was produced by Jerkins. The song was recorded in the United States during the production of Braxton's third studio album, between January and February 2000. During its production, L.A. Reid said "It's very strong, and very personal to her".

All instruments on "He Wasn't Man Enough" are played by Jerkins and the background vocals are sung by Braxton, Nora Payne, Sharlotte Gibson, and Jerkins. The song was recorded in a key signature of E minor. Popmatters praised Braxton, saying "the track seems to be an attempt to make some headway within the lucrative urban R&B market."

The song earned Braxton her sixth Grammy Award for Best Female R&B Vocal Performance in 2001. According to Billboard.com, this song is her last Top 10 appearance on the Billboard Hot 100 to date.

== Critical reception ==
"He Wasn't Man Enough" was widely acclaimed by contemporary music critics. Stephen Thomas Erlewine from AllMusic highlighted the track along with "Gimme Some" as having a "skimmering beat". David Browne from Entertainment Weekly gave it a positive review, certificating it with a B rating. He said "From producer Rodney Jerkins' cushiony pulse to its premise (one woman warning another about her ex-beau), the amenable single "He Wasn't Man Enough" sounds mightily familiar. But it's still no "Scrubs", largely thanks to Braxton's husky, mumbly delivery." NME gave it a positive review, saying that for the track, "Braxton can probably claim the best set of tonsils in soul-pop". Rolling Stone ranked the song number 17 on its list of "The 100 Greatest R&B Songs of the 21st Century".

== Chart performance ==
"He Wasn't Man Enough" peaked at number two on the Billboard Hot 100 for two weeks in May 2000, becoming Braxton's sixth and last top-10 single. The song spent 37 weeks on the chart. The song also peaked at number one on the Hot R&B/Hip-Hop Singles & Tracks chart for four weeks. The song debuted at number five on the UK Singles Chart on its issue date of April 29, 2000. The song debuted at number six on the Australian Singles Chart and peaked at number five in that country. The song debuted at number 36 on the New Zealand Singles Chart and later rose to number five after seven weeks on the charts. The song received platinum by the Recording Industry Association of New Zealand (RIANZ), selling over 15,000 copies there. The song debuted at number 99 on the French Singles Chart before falling out, then re-entering at number 74 on the charts and eventually peaked at number fifteen, becoming the biggest jump of the issue date of July 1, 2000. The song debuted at number 21 on the Single Top 100, peaked at number five and stayed on the charts for seventeen weeks.

== Music video ==
The music video, directed by Bille Woodruff from February 25–26, 2000, begins with Braxton as an animated superhero who unzips her shirt to ward off villains. Next, she is shown dancing in a red cylinder-like hallway. The shot turns to a club where her ex (portrayed by Braxton's former husband Keri Lewis of R&B group Mint Condition) and his current wife (portrayed by Robin Givens) walk in. Givens looks Braxton up and down and flashes her wedding ring at her. Braxton scoffs as she knows of his infidelity.

The video flashes between Braxton dancing in the hallway and the club scene. At one point, the two women are in the club's bathroom, and Braxton informs the new wife why she dumped her husband. They set up an act, wherein Braxton goes into a private room with him and gets him to drop his pants; all the while he is on camera, and everyone at the club, including his current wife, is watching. At the end, Givens busts in and throws the ring at him, and the two women give each other a high five.

The video also features cameo appearances by Rodney Chester and Braxton's sister Tamar. Originally cast to play the husband, actor Michael Jai White ended up dropping out before the video shoot because Givens allegedly took issue with White resembling her former husband Mike Tyson, whom White played in the HBO film Tyson five years earlier. He would appear in the video for Braxton's "Hands Tied" a decade later.

== Track listings ==
US CD and cassette single

1. "He Wasn't Man Enough" (album version) – 4:21
2. "He Wasn't Man Enough" (instrumental) – 4:19

US and Japanese DVD single

1. "He Wasn't Man Enough" (video)
2. "Un-Break My Heart" (video)
3. Special feature: Interview with Toni

European CD single

1. "He Wasn't Man Enough" (radio edit) – 3:58
2. "He Wasn't Man Enough" (extended version) – 5:35

UK and Australian CD single

1. "He Wasn't Man Enough" (radio edit) – 3:58
2. "You're Makin' Me High" (classic edit) – 3:45
3. "He Wasn't Man Enough" (extended version) – 5:35
4. "He Wasn't Man Enough" (video version) – 4:38

UK cassette single

1. "He Wasn't Man Enough" (radio edit) – 3:58
2. "You're Makin' Me High" (classic edit) – 3:45
3. "He Wasn't Man Enough" (extended version) – 5:35

== Credits and personnel ==
Credits are lifted from The Heat album booklet.

Studios

- Recorded at Larrabee North (Universal City, California)
- Mixed at Enterprise Studios (North Hollywood, California)
- Mastered at Powers House of Sound (New York City)

Personnel

- Rodney Jerkins – writing, background vocals, all instruments, production, arrangement, mixing
- Fred Jerkins III – writing, arrangement
- LaShawn Daniels – writing, vocal production, arrangement
- Harvey Mason, Jr. – writing, recording, Pro Tools
- Toni Braxton – vocals, background vocals
- Nora Payne – background vocals
- Sharlotte Gibson – background vocals
- Steve Baughman – recording assistant
- Dexter Simmons – mixing
- Tyson Leeper – mixing assistant
- Roger Lopez – mixing assistant
- Herb Powers – mastering

== Charts ==
=== Weekly charts ===
Chart (2000)	Peak position
Australia (ARIA)	5
Belgium (Ultratop 50 Flanders)	14
Belgium (Ultratop 50 Wallonia)	8
Canada (Nielsen SoundScan)	1
Canada Top Singles (RPM)	2
Canada Adult Contemporary (RPM)	27
Canada Dance/Urban (RPM)	1
Croatia International (HRT)	1
Denmark (IFPI)	5
Europe (Eurochart Hot 100)	5
France (SNEP)	14
Germany (GfK)	20
Iceland (Íslenski Listinn Topp 40)	5
Ireland (IRMA)	12
Italy Airplay (Music & Media)	9
Netherlands (Dutch Top 40)	4
Netherlands (Single Top 100)	5
New Zealand (Recorded Music NZ)	5
Norway (VG-lista)	13
Poland Airplay (Music & Media)	1
Poland (Polish Airplay Charts)	1
Romania (Romanian Top 100)	5
Scottish Singles Sales (Official Charts)	20
Spain (Promusicae)	6
Sweden (Sverigetopplistan)	10
Switzerland (Schweizer Hitparade)	7
UK Singles (Official Charts)	5
UK Hip Hop/R&B (Official Charts)	3
US Billboard Hot 100	2
US Dance Club Songs (Billboard)	16
US Hot R&B/Hip-Hop Songs (Billboard)	1
US Pop Airplay (Billboard)	7
US Rhythmic Airplay (Billboard)	10

=== Year-end charts ===
Chart (2000)	Position
Australia (ARIA)	72
Belgium (Ultratop 50 Flanders)	62
Belgium (Ultratop 50 Wallonia)	22
Europe (Eurochart Hot 100)	44
France (SNEP)	83
Iceland (Íslenski Listinn Topp 40)	15
Netherlands (Dutch Top 40)	25
Netherlands (Single Top 100)	42
New Zealand (RIANZ)	9
Romania (Romanian Top 100)	42
Sweden (Hitlistan)	99
Switzerland (Schweizer Hitparade)	33
UK Singles (OCC)	80
UK Urban (Music Week)	5
US Billboard Hot 100	10
US Hot R&B/Hip-Hop Singles & Tracks (Billboard)	16
US Mainstream Top 40 (Billboard)	29
US Rhythmic Top 40 (Billboard)	29

Chart (2001)	Position
Canada (Nielsen SoundScan)	91

== Certifications and sales ==
Region	Certification	Certified units/sales
Australia (ARIA)	Gold	35,000^{^}
Belgium (BRMA)	Gold	25,000^{*}
New Zealand (RMNZ) Physical sales	Platinum	10,000^{*}
New Zealand (RMNZ) Digital sales + streaming	Platinum	30,000^{‡}
United Kingdom (BPI)	Platinum	600,000^{‡}
United States (RIAA)	Gold	600,000
^{*} Sales figures based on certification alone.^{^} Shipments figures based on certification alone.^{‡} Sales+streaming figures based on certification alone.

== Release history ==
Region	Date	Format(s)	Label(s)	Ref(s).
United States	February 29, 2000	Rhythmic contemporary; urban AC; urban radio	LaFace; Arista	
United States	April 4, 2000	Contemporary hit radio	LaFace; Arista	
Sweden	April 10, 2000	CD	LaFace; Arista; BMG	
United Kingdom	April 17, 2000	CD; cassette	LaFace; Arista; BMG	
Japan	April 24, 2000	CD	LaFace; Arista; BMG	

== Samples ==
In 2022, Nigerian singer Burna Boy sampled the song's instrumental introduction for his hit song "Last Last".
