= Un-Break My Heart =

1996 single by Toni Braxton

Single by Toni Braxton

from the album Secrets
- Written: 1995
- Released: October 7, 1996
- Studio: The Record Plant (Hollywood, California); Chartmaker (Malibu, California)
- Genre: Pop; R&B
- Length: 4:30 (album version); 4:26 (remix version)
- Label: LaFace
- Songwriter: Diane Warren
- Producer: David Foster

Toni Braxton singles chronology
"You're Makin' Me High" / "Let It Flow" (1996)	"Un-Break My Heart" (1996)	"I Don't Want To" / "I Love Me Some Him" (1997)

"Un-Break My Heart" is a song by American singer Toni Braxton for her second studio album, Secrets (1996). The song was written by Diane Warren and produced by David Foster. It was released as the second single from the album on October 7, 1996, through LaFace Records. The song is a ballad about a "blistering heartbreak" in which the singer begs a former lover to return and undo the pain he has caused. It won Best Female Pop Vocal Performance at the 39th Annual Grammy Awards in 1997. It has sold over 10 million copies worldwide and nearly 3 million in the United States alone, making it one of the best selling singles of all time.

"Un-Break My Heart" attained commercial success worldwide. In the United States, the song reached number one on the Billboard Hot 100, where it stayed a total of eleven weeks, while reaching the same position on the Dance Club Play and Adult Contemporary component charts. When Billboard celebrated their 40 years charting from 1958 to 1998, the song was declared as the most successful song by a solo artist in the Billboard Hot 100 history. In Europe, the song reached the top-five in more than ten countries while peaking at number one in Austria, Belgium (Wallonia), Romania, Sweden, and Switzerland.

Bille Woodruff directed the accompanying video for "Un-Break My Heart". It portrays Braxton mourning the death of her lover and reminiscing the good times they had together. Braxton performed the song on the opening ceremony of the 1996 Billboard Music Awards. "Un-Break My Heart" has been covered by several artists, including American rock band Weezer on the album Death to False Metal.

== Background ==
Diane Warren wrote "Un-Break My Heart" in 1995. When asked about her songwriting process, she said that song ideas usually come to her from a title, a chorus, or a drum beat. "Un-Break My Heart" was conceived from its title, and, according to Warren, "it popped into my head, and I thought, 'I don't think I've heard that before, that's kind of interesting.' I started playing around on the piano with these chords and did a key change, and then I knew, 'OK, this is magic.'" Warren further explained that she wrote "Un-Break My Heart" as a ballad and dance song, because that was the way she heard it. She said: "some people only know it as a – gay – dance song!"

When Warren played the finished song to Arista Records' future president (2000-2004) L.A. Reid, he thought it would fit Braxton's then upcoming album. When "Un-Break My Heart" was sent to Braxton, she expressed dislike for the song. According to Warren, "Toni hated the song. She didn't want to do it." Reid was able to convince Braxton to record it, and it later became her signature song. Following the recording sessions of the song, Braxton approached Warren and explained why she was skeptical about recording it, further explaining that she didn't want another "heartbreak track".

Recording sessions occurred at The Record Plant and Chartmaker Studios in Los Angeles, California in the same year. "Un-Break My Heart" was released as the second single from Secrets on November 11, 1996.

== Composition ==
"Un-Break My Heart"
A 27-second sample of the song's chorus, which features Braxton singing about a heartbreak over a R&B background.

Produced by David Foster, "Un-Break My Heart" is a four minute-25 second pop and R&B power ballad. The song's theme alludes to a "blistering heartbreak" in which the singer begs a former lover to return and undo the pain he has caused. David Willoughby, author of The World of Music (2009), said a few phrases such as "Don't leave me in all this pain" are sufficient to reveal the "sadness and the longing" in the song.

Warren showcased Braxton's contralto voice with a low vocal range. The song's sheet music shows the key of B minor, with the chorus in D minor. It is set in a time signature of common time with a moderately slow tempo of 55 beats per minute. Braxton's vocal range spans from the low note of D_{3} to the high note of D_{5}.

The song was remixed by several DJs such as Hex Hector, Frankie Knuckles and Soul Solution. As noted by Jose F. Promis of AllMusic, the song

in its original form, was a massive adult contemporary and pop hit, and, with its larger-than-life chorus, worked equally well as an unstoppable dance number, even if the vocals were never re-recorded.

The "Soul-Hex Vocal Anthem" remix, with a length over nine minutes, was influenced by tribal house music; while the "Classic Radio Mix" is a piano-driven house music edit. A Spanish version of "Un-Break My Heart", titled "Regresa a Mi", was included as a bonus track on Secrets. The CD-single of "Un-Break My Heart" also contained that version, titled "Un-Break My Heart (Spanish Version)". It was adapted to Spanish by Marco Flores and sung by Braxton herself. MusicOMH contributor Laura McKee considered it "an easy listen" version "that encapsulates the passion and meaning of the original but opens it up to a wider audience."

== Reception ==
=== Critical response ===
In 1997, "Un-Break My Heart" won a Grammy Award for Best Female Pop Vocal Performance. About.com reviewer Mark Edward Nero named it one of the best R&B break-up songs and considered it Braxton's "finest moment". He further commented, "damn, this song is so sad it can make people cry for hours at a time." Larry Flick from Billboard magazine described it as "a pop/R&B ballad that casts her in the role she plays best—as the forlorn heroine in a romance on the rocks." He added, "She maximizes the melodrama of David Foster's savvy blend of stately strings and soulful rhythms, móving from a dewy-eyed whisper to a diva-like belt with theatrical ease. Hit-machine tunesmith Diane Warren has not written a song this lyrically potent and heartfelt in a long time." Bob McCann, author of Encyclopedia of African American actresses in film and television (2010), considered it "simply one of the most haunting R&B records ever made", while Robert Christgau named it "miraculous" and explained "the miracle being that it's by Diane Warren and you want to hear it again."

Dave Sholin from the Gavin Report commented: "Most who hear this Diane Warren composition, which was produced with skillful guidance by David Foster, will need to take a few seconds before breathing normally again." Insider said that the song "showcased her show-stopping voice". In a 2015 retrospective review, Pop Rescue wrote that Braxton's vocals "really shine and she's given a real range from very low to powerful highs." The reviewer added that "the music here, aside from the acoustic guitar, is absolutely secondary behind Toni's vocal prowess and the tender lyrics." Spin journalist Charles Aaron positively reviewed the song and joked: "this exquisitely crafted, heart-pumping l-u-v song has been droning in the produce department of my grocery store for about a year now, but I'd just like to go on record as saying that if it ever stops, I'll really be heartbroken." Richard Harrington from The Washington Post felt it's "less sung than confessed as Braxton slips into whispered regrets and second thoughts. This beautiful song becomes a bit cinematic as it goes along and, sure enough, it turns out to be a Warren composition with a Foster production."

While reviewing the album, Stephen Thomas Erlewine of AllMusic said the songs produced by David Foster are too predictable due to their "slick commercial appeal". However, Erlewine noted that Braxton "manages to infuse the songs with life and passion that elevates them beyond their generic confines" due to her vocal ability. Ken Tucker of Entertainment Weekly considered the track "a tearjerker so grandiose and yet so intrinsically, assuredly hit-bound, it's the kind of mass-appeal grabber that's probably already sent a jealous Diana Ross diving for a comfort gallon of Häagen-Dazs." Tucker also named it the worst track on Secrets, and further stated: "Un-Break My Heart" is "one of those the-verses-exist-only-for-the-swelling-chorus showstoppers that allude to emotions without ever actually embodying them. Braxton does her darnedest to plug some life into the song, to no avail". J. D. Considine of The Baltimore Sun described "Un-Break My Heart" as "overblown".

=== Chart performance ===
In the United States, "Un-Break My Heart" managed to peak at number one on the Billboard Hot 100 for eleven weeks, from the week of December 7, 1996, to the week of February 15, 1997, and stayed in the same position on the Adult Contemporary chart for fourteen weeks. The song was later ranked as the fourth-most popular song of the decade on the 1990-1999 Decade-End Hot 100 chart. In 2018, "Un-Break My Heart" was ranked as the 15th-most popular song of all time by Billboard. Despite its success on the Hot 100, the song would not reach the number-one position of the Hot R&B Singles chart, remaining at number two for four weeks behind "I Believe I Can Fly" by R. Kelly. It sold 2.4 million copies domestically and was certified platinum by the Recording Industry Association of America (RIAA). "Un-Break My Heart" also achieved commercial success worldwide, reaching number one in Austria, Belgium (Wallonia), the European Hot 100 Singles, Sweden, and Switzerland, while reaching the top five in several European countries.

In the week of November 4, 1996, the song debuted at number four in the UK Singles Chart, reaching a peak at number two after seven weeks on the chart. According to the British Phonographic Industry (BPI), it has sold and streamed over 1,200,000 units there, being certified double platinum. In Australia, the song peaked at number six, and was later certified platinum by the Australian Recording Industry Association (ARIA), for shipments of more than 70,000 units of the single.

== Music video ==
=== Background ===
LaFace Records commissioned a music video to be directed by American director Bille Woodruff. The concept is a melodramatic tearjerker that evolves around Braxton grieving the sudden death of her lover, played by model Tyson Beckford.

=== Synopsis ===
As the video begins, Beckford is seen leaving their home in a motorbike, with Braxton giving him a goodbye wave, then going to check the mailbox. After he leaves the garage, a car suddenly appears and the careless driver causes an accident, killing him on impact. A shocked Braxton runs to his side, trying to revive him and then cradles his lifeless body while tearfully crying over him. She then walks around the house, remembering the happy times she had with him, such as swimming in the pool, having passionate sex with him in the shower, shaving his beard and playing Twister. During the bridge and final chorus, Braxton is seen singing the song during a live concert, an allusion to the film A Star Is Born. As applause rises, the video fades to black. The music video premiered on September 10, 1996, on MTV. The video received nominations for Best Female Video and Best R&B Video at the 1997 MTV Video Music Awards.

=== Live performances ===
"Un-Break My Heart" was performed during the opening of the 1996 Billboard Music Awards. During the up-tempo rendition of the track, Braxton sported an outfit similar to the ones of theatrical productions Ziegfeld Follies. She also performed it as the closing number of the Libra Tour (2006).

== Track listings ==
- US CD single
1. "Un-Break My Heart" (Album Version) – 4:30
2. "Un-Break My Heart" (Spanish Version) – 4:32
- US CD maxi single
1. "Un-Break My Heart" (Album Version) – 4:30
2. "Un-Break My Heart" (Soul-Hex Anthem Vocal) – 9:36
3. "Un-Break My Heart" (Classic Radio Mix) – 4:26
4. "Un-Break My Heart" (Album Instrumental) – 4:44
- US 12-inch single

A1. "Un-Break My Heart" (Soul-Hex Anthem Vocal) – 9:38
A2. "Un-Break My Heart" (Soul-Hex No Sleep Beats) – 3:56
A3. "Un-Break My Heart" (Acappella) – 3:50
B1. "Un-Break My Heart" (Frankie Knuckles - Franktidrama Club Mix) – 8:40
B2. "Un-Break My Heart" (Frankie Knuckles - Classic Radio Mix) – 4:26

- European CD single
1. "Un-Break My Heart" (Album Version) – 4:30
2. "You're Makin' Me High" (Radio Edit) – 4:07
- UK CD single
1. "Un-Break My Heart" (Album Version) – 4:30
2. "You're Makin' Me High" (Norfside Remix) – 4:19
3. "How Many Ways" (R. Kelly Remix) – 5:46
4. "Un-Break My Heart" (Spanish Version) – 4:32
- European CD maxi single
1. "Un-Break My Heart" (Album Version) – 4:30
2. "Un-Break My Heart" (Frankie Knuckles Radio Mix) – 4:29
3. "Un-Break My Heart" (Frankie Knuckles Franktidrama Mix) – 8:38
4. "Un-Break My Heart" (Soul-Hex Anthem Vocal) – 9:36
5. "Un-Break My Heart" (Soul-Hex No Sleep Beats) – 3:56
- Australian CD maxi single
1. "Un-Break My Heart" (Album Version) – 4:30
2. "You're Makin' Me High" (Norfside Remix) – 4:19
3. "How Many Ways" (R. Kelly Remix) – 5:46
4. "Un-Break My Heart" (Classic Radio Mix) – 4:26
5. "Un-Break My Heart" (Soul-Hex Sleep Beats) – 3:56

== Personnel ==
- Toni Braxton: lead and background vocals
- Diane Warren: songwriter
- David Foster: producer, arranger, keyboard programming
- Felipe Elgueta: engineer
- Mick Guzauski: mixing
- Simon Franglen: Synclavier programming
- Michael Thompson: electric guitar
- Dean Parks: acoustic guitar
- L.A. Reid: background vocal arranger
- Tim Thomas: background vocal arranger
- Shanice Wilson: background vocals

== Charts ==
=== Weekly charts ===
Weekly chart performance for "Un-Break My Heart"
Chart (1996–1997)	Peak position
Australia (ARIA)	6
Austria (Ö3 Austria Top 40)	1
Belgium (Ultratop 50 Flanders)	2
Belgium (Ultratop 50 Wallonia)	1
Belgium Dance (Ultratop Flanders)	13
Canada Top Singles (RPM)	5
Canada Adult Contemporary (RPM)	1
Canada Dance/Urban (RPM)	15
Canada (Nielsen SoundScan)	2
Canada CHR/Top 40 (BDS)	2
Czech Republic (IFPI CR)	4
Denmark (IFPI)	2
Europe (Eurochart Hot 100)	1
Europe (European Dance Radio)	1
Finland (Suomen virallinen lista)	5
France (SNEP)	8
Germany (GfK)	2
Hungary (Mahasz)	5
Iceland (Íslenski Listinn Topp 40)	2
Ireland (IRMA)	2
Israel (Israeli Singles Chart)	1
Italy (Musica e dischi)	7
Italy Airplay (Music & Media)	3
Netherlands (Dutch Top 40)	2
Netherlands (Single Top 100)	2
New Zealand (Recorded Music NZ)	18
Norway (VG-lista)	2
Romania (Romanian Top 100)	1
Scotland (Official Charts Company)	5
Spain (AFYVE)	2
Sweden (Sverigetopplistan)	1
Switzerland (Schweizer Hitparade)	1
Taiwan (IFPI)	1
UK Singles (OCC)	2
UK R&B (OCC)	1
US Billboard Hot 100	1
US Adult Contemporary (Billboard)	1
US Adult Pop Airplay (Billboard)	4
US Dance Club Songs (Billboard)	1
US Dance Singles Sales (Billboard)	1
US Hot R&B/Hip-Hop Songs (Billboard)	2
US Pop Airplay (Billboard)	2
US Rhythmic Airplay (Billboard)	1
US Cash Box Top 100	6

=== Year-end charts ===
1996 year-end chart performance for "Un-Break My Heart"
Chart (1996)	Position
Europe (Eurochart Hot 100)	80
Israel (Israeli Singles Chart)	9
Netherlands (Dutch Top 40)	15
Netherlands (Single Top 100)	10
Norway (VG-lista)	17
Sweden (Topplistan)	9
UK Singles (OCC)	13
UK Airplay (Music Week)	35
US Billboard Hot 100	81
US Hot R&B Singles (Billboard)	87
US Top 40/Rhythm-Crossover (Billboard)	62

1997 year-end chart performance for "Un-Break My Heart"
Chart (1997)	Position
Australia (ARIA)	34
Austria (Ö3 Austria Top 40)	6
Belgium (Ultratop 50 Flanders)	13
Belgium (Ultratop 50 Wallonia)	8
Brazil Airplay (Crowley)	1
Canada Top Singles (RPM)	32
Canada Adult Contemporary (RPM)	2
Europe (Eurochart Hot 100)	6
France (SNEP)	29
Germany (Media Control)	13
Norway (VG-lista)	7
Romania (Romanian Top 100)	5
Sweden (Topplistan)	17
Switzerland (Schweizer Hitparade)	7
UK Singles (OCC)	68
US Billboard Hot 100	4
US Adult Contemporary (Billboard)	1
US Adult Top 40 (Billboard)	21
US Dance Club Play (Billboard)	1
US Hot R&B Singles (Billboard)	18
US Maxi-Singles Sales (Billboard)	2
US Rhythmic Top 40 (Billboard)	6
US Top 40/Mainstream (Billboard)	14

=== Decade-end charts ===
Decade-end chart performance for "Un-Break My Heart"
Chart (1990–1999)	Position
Austria (Ö3 Austria Top 40)	83
Netherlands (Dutch Top 40)	61
US Billboard Hot 100	4

=== All-time charts ===
All-time chart performance for "Un-Break My Heart"
Chart (1958–2018)	Position
US Billboard Hot 100	15

== Certifications and sales ==
Certifications and sales for "Un-Break My Heart"
Region	Certification	Certified units/sales
Australia (ARIA)	Platinum	70,000^{^}
Austria (IFPI Austria)	Gold	25,000^{*}
Belgium (BRMA)	Platinum	50,000^{*}
Denmark (IFPI Danmark)	Gold	45,000^{‡}
France (SNEP)	Gold	250,000^{*}
Germany (BVMI)	Platinum	500,000^{^}
Netherlands (NVPI)	Platinum	75,000^{^}
New Zealand (RMNZ) Physical sales	Gold	5,000^{*}
New Zealand (RMNZ) Digital sales + streaming	Gold	15,000^{‡}
Norway (IFPI Norway)	2× Platinum	
Sweden (GLF)	Platinum	30,000^{^}
Switzerland (IFPI Switzerland)	Gold	25,000^{^}
United Kingdom (BPI)	2× Platinum	1,200,000^{‡}
United States (RIAA)	Platinum	2,400,000
Summaries
Worldwide	—	10,000,000
^{*} Sales figures based on certification alone.^{^} Shipments figures based on certification alone.^{‡} Sales+streaming figures based on certification alone.

== Release history ==
Release dates and formats for "Un-Break My Heart"
Region	Date	Format(s)	Label	Ref.
United States	September 24, 1996	Rhythmic contemporary radio	LaFace	
United States	October 1, 1996	Contemporary hit radio	LaFace	
Europe	October 7, 1996	CD single	LaFace	
Europe	October 7, 1996	Maxi single	LaFace	
United Kingdom	October 14, 1996	CD; cassette	LaFace	
Sweden	November 11, 1996	CD	LaFace	
United States	November 11, 1996	Remix EP	LaFace	
Japan	November 21, 1996	CD	LaFace	

== Cover versions ==
Italian group Il Divo's cover of the Spanish version of the track, "Regresa a mí", received positive appreciation from critics, who said the cover "has the potential to be a hit and to open doors for many of opera's most acclaimed stars."

American alternative rock band Weezer also covered "Un-Break My Heart" in 2005. Their version was released on the album Death to False Metal in 2010. Lead vocalist Rivers Cuomo explained why the band covered the track:

"I loved that song. It was actually Rick Rubin's suggestion. We both loved that song and we both thought it would be great for Weezer, and for my voice, and it'd be great to do like a rock version of it with more of an alternative aesthetic. And you know, just the way I would sing it versus in the way Toni Braxton would sing it. And I love the way it came out, and I think probably the rest of the band really does not like it, and that's probably why it didn't make our fifth record, in 2005 when we were recording it."

=== Il Divo version ===
"Regresa a mí"

Single by Il Divo

from the album Il Divo
- Language: Spanish
- English title: "Return to Me"
- Released: 2004
- Recorded: 2004
- Studio: Metropolis (London, England)
- Length: 4:36
- Label: Syco; Columbia
- Songwriters: Diane Warren, Marco Flores (Spanish adaptation) (uncredited)
- Producer: Steve Mac

Il Divo singles chronology
"Regresa a mí" (2004)	"My Way (A mi manera)" (2005)

Music video
- "Regresa a Mí" on YouTube

A cover version of Toni Braxton's Spanish-language version of the song, "Regresa a mí" (Come Back To Me) was recorded and published as a power ballad by the multi-national UK-based quartet Il Divo. It was released in 2004 as the first single from their debut self-titled album.

Il Divo manager Simon Cowell bought the rights of the song from Warren. The song was released as the first single from the group's first album Il Divo, released in 2004. The song was recorded at the beginning of 2004 at the Studies Rokstone in London, under the production of the British producer Steve Mac. On April 5, 2005, Il Divo appeared on the American television program The Oprah Winfrey Show to perform the song.

==== Charts ====
Weekly chart performance for "Regresa a mí"
Chart (2004–2005)	Peak position
France (SNEP)	88
US Adult Contemporary (Billboard)	33

== See also ==
- List of Billboard Adult Contemporary number ones of 1997

== Bibliography ==
- Willoughby, David (2009). The World of Music. McGraw-Hill Higher Education. ISBN 9780073401416.
- McCan, Bob (2010). Encyclopedia of African American actresses in film and television. McFarland. ISBN 9780786437900.
