= Libra Tour =

2006 concert tour by Toni Braxton

- Tour by Toni Braxton
- Associated album: Libra
- Start date: March 10, 2006
- End date: July 3, 2006
- Legs: 1
- No. of shows: 29 in North America

Toni Braxton concert chronology
- Secrets Tour (1996–97); Libra Tour (2006); Toni Braxton: Revealed (2006–08)

The Libra Tour was the second concert tour by American pop-R&B singer Toni Braxton. The tour, which was in support of her RIAA gold-selling album Libra, kicked off in Atlantic City, New Jersey, on March 10 and continued through mid-summer. Braxton played to sold-out shows across the US, performing in venues such as theaters, instead of arenas.

The tour included a selection of songs from the new album, and featured hit songs from Toni Braxton, Secrets, The Heat and More Than a Woman. Toni's sisters, Tamar Braxton and Trina Braxton, joined the tour as background singers.

== Opening act ==
- James Stephens III (select dates)

== Set list ==
1. "Overture" (Instrumental)
2. "Please"
3. "Spanish Guitar"
4. "He Wasn't Man Enough"
5. "Take This Ring"
6. "How Many Ways"
7. "You're Makin' Me High"
8. "Suddenly"^{1}
9. "Shadowless"
10. "Just Be a Man About It"
11. "I Don't Want To"
12. "Love Shoulda Brought You Home"
13. "Seven Whole Days"
14. "Another Sad Love Song"
15. "You Mean the World to Me"
16. "How Could an Angel Break My Heart"
17. "Let It Flow"
18. "Trippin' (That's the Way Love Works)"
19. "I Wanna Be (Your Baby)"

Encore

20. "Breathe Again"
21. "Un-Break My Heart"

^{1} performed only at selected dates

== Additional notes ==
- On select dates, as Toni performed one of her signature ballads; she would choose a lucky gentleman to bring on stage, as she sat on his lap and sang. One of the many highlights throughout the show, and a rousing ovation from the crowd.

== Shows ==
Date	City	Country	Venue
North America
March 10, 2006	Atlantic City	United States	Tropicana Showroom
March 11, 2006	Washington, D.C.	United States	DAR Constitution Hall
March 12, 2006	Westbury	United States	North Fork Theatre
March 15, 2006	Red Bank	United States	Count Basie Theatre
March 16, 2006	Verona	United States	Turning Stone Resort Showroom
March 17, 2006	Boston	United States	Orpheum Theatre
March 18, 2006	Ledyard	United States	Foxwoods Theatre
March 21, 2006	Milwaukee	United States	Northern Lights Theater
March 22, 2006	Chicago	United States	House of Blues
March 23, 2006	Oneida	United States	Radisson Three Clans Ballroom
March 25, 2006	Kansas City	United States	Star Pavilion
March 26, 2006	St. Louis	United States	Pageant Concert NightClub
March 29, 2006	Morristown	United States	Mayo Performing Arts Center
March 30, 2006	Rama	Canada	Rama Entertainment Centre
April 2, 2006	New York City	United States	Nokia Theatre Times Square
April 3, 2006	Baltimore	United States	Modell Performing Arts Center
April 6, 2006	Indio	United States	Fantasy Springs Special Events Center
April 7, 2006	Pala	United States	Pala Events Center
April 8, 2006	Reno	United States	Grand Exposition Hall
April 11, 2006	Friant	United States	Table Mountain Casino Event Center
April 12, 2006	Oxnard	United States	Oxnard Performing Arts Center
April 13, 2006	Oakland	United States	Paramount Theatre
June 21, 2006	Sunrise	United States	Sinatra Theatre
June 22, 2006	Orlando	United States	Hard Rock Live
June 23, 2006	Atlanta	United States	Chastain Park Amphitheater
June 25, 2006^{[A]}	Hampton	United States	Hampton Coliseum
June 30, 2006^{[B]}	Memphis	United States	Memphis Botanic Gardens
July 1, 2006	Grand Prairie	United States	Nokia Live at Grand Prairie
July 3, 2006^{[C]}	Houston	Reliant Stadium	

Festivals and other miscellaneous performances
^{A} Hampton Jazz Festival
^{B} Live at the Garden Summer Concert Series
^{C} Essence Music Festival

=== Box office score data ===
Venue	City	Tickets sold / available	Gross revenue
Nokia Theatre Times Square	New York City	948 / 1,187 (79%)	$73,349
