= Toni Braxton: Revealed =

First concert residency by American Singer Toni Braxton

- Residency by Toni Braxton
- Location: Las Vegas, Nevada, U.S.
- Venue: Flamingo Showroom
- Start date: August 3, 2006
- End date: April 7, 2008
- No. of shows: 249

Toni Braxton concert chronology
- Libra Tour (2006); Toni Braxton: Revealed (2006–08); 2013 Summer Tour (2013)

Toni Braxton: Revealed was the first concert residency by American singer Toni Braxton. It was performed in the Flamingo Showroom at the Flamingo Las Vegas until the announcement of its cancellation in May 2008.

== Background and development ==
On May 19, 2006, the Flamingo Hotel and Casino in Las Vegas announced that Braxton would replace Wayne Newton as the casino's new headlining act from December 3, 2006. The show, entitled Toni Braxton: Revealed, was to be performed six nights a week and was scheduled to run through to March 2007. Braxton later confirmed that she was extending her show through to August 2007. Due to its success, it was reported that Braxton would extend her show through to August 2010. The show was later cancelled in order for Braxton to focus on her health. The production featured nine dancers with choreography, along with a specially designed set with an LED screen and costumes designed by Dolce & Gabbana.

== Reception ==
The Las Vegas Sun gave a mixed review of three out of five stars, saying "Toni Braxton: Revealed" continues to be plagued with some pesky problems, both technical and artistic. Mikes keyed too softly sometimes make it difficult to understand her words. Sometimes, her words are overpowered by the band. But the biggest let-down is the lip-syncing."

Mike Weatherford of the Las Vegas Review-Journal gave the show a mixed review, complaining about "the anticlimactic treatment of her best-known songs. They just don’t have the resonance they should." But he favorably compared the show to Celine Dion's Las Vegas engagement, saying, "Amid all the hoopla surrounding Celine Dion’s final shows last weekend, Las Vegas’ other working pop-star mom forged on with 'Revealed,' a revue that runs on a fraction of the budget of 'A New Day ...' but likewise has become a smoother, more graceful showcase over time."

In June 2008, Mike Weatherford of the Las Vegas Review-Journal referred to Braxtons show as an "unqualified success". The Flamingo president, Don Marrandino stated "It was very profitable. There was never a weekend when we weren't full."

== Legal issues ==
In August 2007, Anthony Franco, who designed the entire wardrobe for the show sued Braxton claiming she had agreed to pay him $35,000. Franco said he received a check, but it was returned for insufficient funds. He alleged Braxton and co-defendant Liberty Entertainment put a stop-payment on the check. Franco claimed he was eventually paid $20,000, leaving an outstanding balance of $15,000.

== Set list ==
This set list is representative of the performance on August 3, 2006. It does not represent all concerts for the duration of the residency.

1. "You're Makin' Me High"
2. "Take This Ring"
3. "How Many Ways"
4. "Love Shoulda Brought You Home"
5. "Another Sad Love Song"
6. "You Mean the World to Me"
7. "Seven Whole Days"
8. "Just Be a Man About It"
9. "I Love Me Some Him"
10. "I Don't Want To"
11. "How Could an Angel Break My Heart"
12. "Please"
13. "Spanish Guitar"
14. "I Wanna Be (Your Baby)"
15. "Trippin' (That's the Way Love Works)"
16. "Let It Flow"
17. "Breathe Again"
18. "He Wasn't Man Enough"
19. "Un-Break My Heart"

Note: The setlist may have changed their order as they advanced the dates.

== Shows ==
2006 shows
August 3, 2006
August 22, 2006
August 23, 2006
August 24, 2006
August 25, 2006
August 26, 2006
August 29, 2006
August 30, 2006
August 31, 2006
September 1, 2006
September 2, 2006
September 5, 2006
September 6, 2006
September 7, 2006
September 8, 2006
September 9, 2006
September 12, 2006
September 13, 2006
September 14, 2006
September 15, 2006
November 7, 2006
November 8, 2006
November 9, 2006
November 10, 2006
November 11, 2006
November 14, 2006
November 15, 2006
November 16, 2006
November 17, 2006
November 18, 2006
November 21, 2006
November 22, 2006
November 23, 2006
November 24, 2006
November 25, 2006
December 12, 2006
December 13, 2006
December 14, 2006
December 15, 2006
December 16, 2006
December 19, 2006
December 20, 2006
December 21, 2006
December 22, 2006
December 23, 2006
December 26, 2006
December 27, 2006
December 28, 2006
December 29, 2006
December 30, 2006

2007 shows
January 9, 2007
January 10, 2007
January 11, 2007
January 12, 2007
January 13, 2007
January 16, 2007
January 17, 2007
January 18, 2007
January 19, 2007
January 20, 2007
January 23, 2007
January 24, 2007
January 25, 2007
January 26, 2007
February 13, 2007
February 14, 2007
February 15, 2007
February 16, 2007
February 17, 2007
February 20, 2007
February 21, 2007
February 22, 2007
February 23, 2007
February 24, 2007
March 6, 2007
March 7, 2007
March 8, 2007
March 9, 2007
March 10, 2007
March 13, 2007
March 14, 2007
March 15, 2007
March 16, 2007
March 17, 2007
March 20, 2007
March 21, 2007
March 22, 2007
March 23, 2007
March 24, 2007
May 9, 2007
May 10, 2007
May 11, 2007
May 12, 2007
May 15, 2007
May 16, 2007
May 17, 2007
May 18, 2007
May 19, 2007
May 22, 2007
May 23, 2007
May 24, 2007
May 25, 2007
May 26, 2007
May 29, 2007
May 30, 2007
May 31, 2007
June 1, 2007
June 2, 2007
June 5, 2007
June 7, 2007
June 8, 2007
June 9, 2007
June 12, 2007
June 13, 2007
June 14, 2007
June 15, 2007
June 16, 2007
June 19, 2007
June 20, 2007
June 21, 2007
June 22, 2007
June 23, 2007
June 26, 2007
June 27, 2007
June 28, 2007
June 29, 2007
June 30, 2007
July 3, 2007
July 4, 2007
July 10, 2007
July 11, 2007
July 12, 2007
July 13, 2007
July 14, 2007
July 17, 2007
July 18, 2007
July 19, 2007
July 20, 2007
July 21, 2007
July 24, 2007
July 25, 2007
July 26, 2007
July 27, 2007
July 28, 2007
July 31, 2007
August 1, 2007
August 2, 2007
August 3, 2007
August 4, 2007
August 21, 2007
August 22, 2007
August 23, 2007
August 24, 2007
August 25, 2007
August 28, 2007
August 29, 2007
August 30, 2007
August 31, 2007
September 1, 2007
September 4, 2007
September 5, 2007
September 6, 2007
September 7, 2007
September 8, 2007
September 11, 2007
September 12, 2007
September 13, 2007
September 14, 2007
September 15, 2007
October 10, 2007
October 11, 2007
October 12, 2007
October 13, 2007
October 16, 2007
October 17, 2007
October 18, 2007
October 19, 2007
October 20, 2007
October 23, 2007
October 24, 2007
October 25, 2007
October 26, 2007
October 27, 2007
October 30, 2007
October 31, 2007
November 1, 2007
November 2, 2007
November 3, 2007
November 6, 2007
November 7, 2007
November 8, 2007
November 9, 2007
November 10, 2007
November 13, 2007
November 14, 2007
November 15, 2007
November 16, 2007
November 17, 2007
November 20, 2007
November 21, 2007
November 22, 2007
November 23, 2007
November 24, 2007
November 27, 2007
November 28, 2007
November 29, 2007
November 30, 2007
December 1, 2007
December 11, 2007
December 12, 2007
December 14, 2007
December 15, 2007
December 18, 2007
December 19, 2007
December 21, 2007
December 22, 2007

2008 shows
January 15, 2008
January 16, 2008
January 18, 2008
January 19, 2008
January 22, 2008
January 23, 2008
January 24, 2008
January 25, 2008
January 29, 2008
January 30, 2008
February 1, 2008
February 2, 2008
February 5, 2008
February 6, 2008
February 7, 2008
February 8, 2008
February 9, 2008
February 12, 2008
February 13, 2008
February 14, 2008
February 15, 2008
February 16, 2008
March 4, 2008
March 5, 2008
March 6, 2008
March 7, 2008
March 8, 2008
March 11, 2008
March 12, 2008
March 13, 2008
March 14, 2008
March 15, 2008
April 7, 2008
