= 2013 Summer Tour (Toni Braxton) =

2013 concert tour by Toni Braxton

- Tour by Toni Braxton
- Start date: August 9, 2013
- End date: August 31, 2013
- Legs: 1
- No. of shows: 13 in North America

Toni Braxton concert chronology
- Toni Braxton: Revealed (2006–08); 2013 Summer Tour (2013); Toni Braxton & Babyface Live (2015)

The 2013 Summer Tour was the third concert tour by American pop/R&B singer Toni Braxton. The tour kicked off in Las Vegas on August 9, 2013 and ended in Atlanta on August 31, 2013. Toni's sisters, Trina and Towanda Braxton, were featured on the tour as background singers.

== Setlist ==
1. "I Heart You"
2. "How Many Ways"
3. "Seven Whole Days"
4. "You Mean the World to Me"
5. "Another Sad Love Song"
6. "Love Shoulda Brought You Home"
7. "How Could an Angel Break My Heart"
8. "Yesterday"
9. "Just Be a Man About It"
10. "I Love Me Some Him"
11. "There's No Me Without You" / "Trippin' (That's the Way Love Works)" / "I Don't Want To"
12. "Spanish Guitar"
13. "Let It Flow"
14. "Breathe Again"
15. "Party or Go Home" (performed by Trina Braxton)
16. "Please" / "Take This Ring" / "Hit the Freeway"
17. "He Wasn't Man Enough"

Encore

18. "You're Makin' Me High"
19. "Between the Sheets"
20. "Un-Break My Heart"

== Band ==
- Musical Director/Piano: Davy Nathan
- Keyboards: Kevin Randolph
- Guitar: Roy Kariok
- Bass: Dammo Farmer
- Drums: Donald Barrett
- Background vocalists: Trina Braxton, Towanda Braxton

== Shows ==
Date	City	Country	Venue
North America
August 9, 2013	Las Vegas	United States	Pearl Concert Theater
August 12, 2013^{[A]}	New York City	United States	Wingate Field
August 14, 2013	New Brunswick	United States	State Theatre
August 16, 2013	Rama	Canada	Casino Rama Entertainment Centre
August 17, 2013	Detroit	United States	Chene Park Amphitheatre
August 18, 2013	Durham	United States	Durham Performing Arts Center
August 21, 2013	Baltimore	United States	Pier Six Pavilion
August 23, 2013	Lincoln	United States	Twin River Event Center
August 24, 2013	Atlantic City	United States	Etess Arena
August 25, 2013	Westbury	United States	NYCB Theatre at Westbury
August 28, 2013	St. Petersburg	United States	Mahaffey Theater
August 29, 2013	Miami	United States	James L. Knight Center
August 31, 2013	Atlanta	United States	Chastain Park Amphitheater

Festivals and other miscellaneous performances
^{A} 31st annual Martin Luther King Jr. Concert Series

Cancellations and rescheduled shows

August 10, 2013	Coquitlam, Canada	Red Robinson Show Theatre	Cancelled

=== Box office score data ===
Venue	City	Tickets sold / available	Gross revenue
Durham Performing Arts Center	Durham	1,904 / 2,712 (70%)	$91,503
