= Secrets Tour =

1996–97 concert tour by Toni Braxton

- Tour by Toni Braxton
- Associated album: Secrets
- Start date: August 18, 1996
- End date: October 1, 1997
- Legs: 4
- No. of shows: 119 in North America; 31 in Europe; 150 Total

Toni Braxton concert chronology
- Secrets Tour (1996–97); Libra Tour (2006)

The Secrets Tour was the debut concert tour by American pop/R&B singer Toni Braxton. The tour was in support of her album, Secrets. The tour began during the summer of 1996 in theatres. Jazz saxophonist Kenny G joined the tour September 18, 1996. Remaining shows in the U.S. were billed as An Evening with Kenny G & Toni Braxton. According to Pollstar's 1997 Mid-Year Report, the tour was the fourth highest grossing in the U.S., with $15.8 million grossed across 45 shows.

== Opening act ==
- The Braxtons (North America, select dates)
- Kenny G (North America, select dates) (special guest)

== Setlist ==
This setlist is from the concert held at the United Center in Chicago, Illinois, January 18, 1997. It is not representative of all shows during the tour.

1. "Overture"
2. "Seven Whole Days"
3. "Another Sad Love Song"
4. "Love Shoulda Brought You Home"
5. "There's No Me Without You"
6. "Talking In His Sleep"
7. "Find Me a Man"
8. "I Love Me Some Him"
9. "Instrumental Sequence" (contains elements of "I Want You Back" / "Breakin' My Heart (Pretty Brown Eyes)" / "What Kind of Man Would I Be?")
10. "Breathe Again"
11. "You Mean the World to Me"
12. "Why Should I Care"
13. "Let It Flow"
14. "I Don't Want To"
15. "In the Late of Night"
16. "Come on Over Here"
17. "Dance Sequence"
18. "How Could an Angel Break My Heart" (performed with Kenny G)

Encore

19. "Un-Break My Heart"
20. "You're Makin' Me High"

Notes

During the September 12, show at Wembley Arena in London, Toni dedicated her performance of "Un-Break My Heart" to Princess Diana, who died two weeks prior.

== Shows ==
Date	City	Country	Venue
North America
August 18, 1996	Washington, D.C.	United States	DAR Constitution Hall
August 19, 1996	Washington, D.C.	United States	DAR Constitution Hall
August 20, 1996	Pittsburgh	United States	Benedum Center
August 21, 1996	Columbus	United States	Palace Theatre
August 23, 1996	Chicago	United States	Chicago Theatre
August 24, 1996	Chicago	United States	Chicago Theatre
August 25, 1996	Chicago	United States	Chicago Theatre
August 27, 1996	Detroit	United States	Fox Theatre
August 29, 1996	St. Louis	United States	Fox Theatre
August 31, 1996	Memphis	United States	Orpheum Theatre
September 5, 1996	New Orleans	United States	Saenger Theatre
September 6, 1996	Birmingham	United States	Alabama Theatre
September 7, 1996	Atlanta	United States	Fox Theatre
September 8, 1996	Atlanta	United States	Fox Theatre
September 10, 1996	Atlanta	United States	Fox Theatre
September 11, 1996	Atlanta	United States	Fox Theatre
September 13, 1996	Orlando	United States	Bob Carr Performing Arts Centre
September 14, 1996	Miami	United States	James L. Knight Center
September 15, 1996	Miami	United States	James L. Knight Center
September 18, 1996	New York City	United States	Radio City Music Hall
September 19, 1996	New York City	United States	Radio City Music Hall
September 20, 1996	New York City	United States	Radio City Music Hall
September 21, 1996	New York City	United States	Radio City Music Hall
September 24, 1996	New York City	United States	Radio City Music Hall
September 26, 1996	New York City	United States	Radio City Music Hall
September 29, 1996	Boston	United States	Boston Opera House
September 30, 1996	Wallingford	United States	SNET Oakdale Theatre
October 1, 1996	Westbury	United States	Westbury Music Fair
October 2, 1996	Atlantic City	United States	Circus Maximus Showroom
October 3, 1996	Upper Darby Township	United States	Tower Theater
October 6, 1996	Richmond	United States	Landmark Theater
October 8, 1996	Louisville	United States	Palace Theatre
October 9, 1996	Nashville	United States	Ryman Auditorium
October 11, 1996	Raleigh	United States	Raleigh Memorial Auditorium
October 12, 1996	Greenville	United States	Peace Concert Hall
October 13, 1996	Charleston	United States	McAlister Field House
October 15, 1996	Augusta	United States	Bell Auditorium
October 16, 1996	Savannah	United States	Mercer Theatre
October 17, 1996	Jacksonville	United States	Florida Theatre
October 19, 1996	Tallahassee	United States	Tallahassee-Leon County Civic Center
October 21, 1996	Tampa	United States	Morsani Hall
October 23, 1996	Mobile	United States	Mobile Civic Center Theater
October 24, 1996	Jackson	United States	Mississippi Coliseum
October 25, 1996	Shreveport	United States	Strand Theatre
October 28, 1996	Houston	United States	Jones Hall
October 29, 1996	Dallas	United States	Majestic Theatre
November 2, 1996	Tempe	United States	Gammage Memorial Auditorium
November 3, 1996	Las Vegas	United States	Circus Maximus Showroom
November 4, 1996	Las Vegas	United States	Circus Maximus Showroom
November 6, 1996	Los Angeles	United States	Hollywood Palladium
November 7, 1996	Los Angeles	United States	Hollywood Palladium
November 8, 1996	Los Angeles	United States	Hollywood Palladium
November 17, 1996	New York City	United States	Radio City Music Hall
November 18, 1996	New York City	United States	Radio City Music Hall
November 19, 1996	New York City	United States	Radio City Music Hall
December 15, 1996	Seattle	United States	KeyArena
December 17, 1996	Portland	United States	Rose Garden
December 20, 1996	San Jose	United States	San Jose Arena
December 21, 1996	Anaheim	United States	Arrowhead Pond of Anaheim
December 22, 1996	Fresno	United States	Selland Arena
December 27, 1996	Los Angeles	United States	Universal Amphitheatre
December 28, 1996	Los Angeles	United States	Universal Amphitheatre
December 30, 1996	Los Angeles	United States	Universal Amphitheatre
December 31, 1996	Sacramento	United States	ARCO Arena
January 5, 1997	Salt Lake City	United States	Delta Center
January 6, 1997	Denver	United States	McNichols Sports Arena
January 8, 1997	Las Vegas	United States	MGM Grand Garden Arena
January 9, 1997	Phoenix	United States	America West Arena
January 12, 1997	Minneapolis	United States	Target Center
January 13, 1997	Milwaukee	United States	Bradley Center
January 15, 1997	St. Louis	United States	Kiel Center
January 17, 1997	Auburn Hills	United States	The Palace of Auburn Hills
January 18, 1997	Chicago	United States	United Center
January 21, 1997	Cleveland	United States	Gund Arena
January 23, 1997	Philadelphia	United States	CoreStates Center
January 24, 1997	Pittsburgh	United States	Civic Arena
January 29, 1997	New York City	United States	Radio City Music Hall
January 31, 1997	New York City	United States	Radio City Music Hall
February 1, 1997	New York City	United States	Radio City Music Hall
February 2, 1997	New York City	United States	Radio City Music Hall
February 3, 1997	New York City	United States	Radio City Music Hall
February 4, 1997	New York City	United States	Radio City Music Hall
February 7, 1997	Boston	United States	FleetCenter
February 11, 1997	Buffalo	United States	Marine Midland Arena
February 14, 1997	Albany	United States	Pepsi Arena
February 16, 1997	Charlotte	United States	Charlotte Coliseum
February 17, 1997	Hampton	United States	Hampton Coliseum
February 19, 1997	Atlanta	United States	Omni Coliseum
February 20, 1997	Nashville	United States	Nashville Arena
February 21, 1997	Greensboro	United States	Greensboro Coliseum
February 27, 1997	Orlando	United States	Orlando Arena
February 28, 1997	Miami	United States	Miami Arena
March 1, 1997	West Palm Beach	United States	Coral Sky Amphitheatre
March 2, 1997	Tampa	United States	Ice Palace
March 5, 1997	New Orleans	United States	UNO Lakefront Arena
March 6, 1997	Birmingham	United States	BJCC Coliseum
March 8, 1997	Dallas	United States	Reunion Arena
March 10, 1997	Auburn Hills	United States	The Palace of Auburn Hills
March 12, 1997	Cleveland	United States	Gund Arena
March 13, 1997	Indianapolis	United States	Market Square Arena
March 14, 1997	Chicago	United States	United Center
June 1, 1997	Chicago	United States	United Center
June 2, 1997	Grand Rapids	United States	Van Andel Arena
June 3, 1997	Auburn Hills	United States	The Palace at Auburn Hills
June 5, 1997	Worcester	United States	Centrum in Worcester
June 9, 1997	Toronto	Canada	Maple Leaf Gardens
June 10, 1997	Toronto	Canada	Maple Leaf Gardens
June 12, 1997	Montreal	Canada	Molson Centre
June 15, 1997	Uniondale	United States	Nassau Veterans Memorial Coliseum
June 16, 1997	East Rutherford	United States	Continental Airlines Arena
June 17, 1997	Atlantic City	United States	Boardwalk Hall
June 20, 1997	Baltimore	United States	Baltimore Arena
June 21, 1997	Richmond	United States	Richmond Coliseum
June 23, 1997	Fairborn	United States	Nutter Center
June 24, 1997	Peoria	United States	Carver Arena
June 25, 1997	Kansas City	United States	Kemper Arena
June 28, 1997	Houston	United States	The Summit
June 29, 1997	San Antonio	United States	Freeman Coliseum
July 1, 1997	San Diego	United States	San Diego Sports Arena
Europe
August 16, 1997	Glasgow	Scotland	SECC Concert Hall 4
August 18, 1997	Belfast	Ireland	King's Hall
August 20, 1997	Newcastle	England	Telewest Arena
August 24, 1997	Antwerp	Belgium	Sportpaleis
August 25, 1997	Cologne	Germany	Sporthalle Köln
August 26, 1997	Amsterdam	Netherlands	Sporthallen Zuid
August 28, 1997	Copenhagen	Denmark	Valby-Hallen
August 30, 1997	Stockholm	Sweden	Stockholm Globe Arena
August 31, 1997	Oslo	Norway	Oslo Spektrum
September 2, 1997	Berlin	Germany	Deutschlandhalle
September 4, 1997	Vienna	Austria	Wiener Stadthalle
September 5, 1997	Munich	Germany	Olympiahalle
September 6, 1997	Zürich	Switzerland	Hallenstadion
September 8, 1997	Sheffield	England	Sheffield Arena
September 9, 1997	Birmingham	England	NEC Arena
September 10, 1997	Manchester	England	NYNEX Arena
September 12, 1997	London	England	Wembley Arena
September 13, 1997	London	England	Wembley Arena
September 14, 1997	London	England	Wembley Arena
September 15, 1997	Dublin	Ireland	Point Theatre
September 17, 1997	Rotterdam	Netherlands	Rotterdam Ahoy Sportpaleis
September 18, 1997	Rotterdam	Netherlands	Rotterdam Ahoy Sportpaleis
September 20, 1997	Brussels	Belgium	Forest National
September 21, 1997	Paris	France	Zénith de Paris
September 23, 1997	Düsseldorf	Germany	Philips Halle
September 24, 1997	Erfurt	Germany	Mehrzweckhalle
September 25, 1997	Oberhausen	Germany	Arena Oberhausen
September 27, 1997	Frankfurt	Germany	Festhalle Frankfurt
September 28, 1997	Hamburg	Germany	Alsterdorfer Sporthalle
September 30, 1997	Milan	Italy	FilaForum di Assago
October 1, 1997	Lyon	France	Halle Tony Garnier

=== Box office score data ===
Venue	City	Tickets sold / available	Gross revenue
KeyArena	Seattle	10,829 / 12,023 (90%)	$493,285
San Jose Arena	San Jose	13,347 / 13,347 (100%)	$537,665
Selland Arena	Fresno	7,690 / 9,012 (85%)	$211,955
Universal Amphitheatre	Los Angeles	22,270 / 22,270 (100%)	$1,161,343
ARCO Arena	Sacramento	8,157 / 10,500 (78%)	$428,490
Target Center	Minneapolis	6,995 / 10,000 (70%)	$294,030
Kiel Center	St. Louis	12,172 / 13,000 (94%)	$517,588
The Palace of Auburn Hills	Auburn Hills	15,678 / 15,678 (100%)	$531,245
United Center	Chicago	27,175 / 27,175 (100%)	$999,463
Gund Arena	Cleveland	13,276 / 14,600 (91%)	$428,090
CoreStates Center	Philadelphia	12,957 / 13,500 (96%)	$411,320
Civic Arena	Pittsburgh	12,475 / 12,475 (100%)	$381,988
Radio City Music Hall	New York City	35,226 / 35,226 (100%)	$2,623,390
FleetCenter	Boston	13,900 / 13,900 (100%)	$448,324
Marine Midland Arena	Buffalo	10,758 / 15,000 (72%)	$444,983
Pepsi Arena	Albany	11,124 / 11,124 (100%)	$366,025
Charlotte Coliseum	Charlotte	9,298 / 12,000 (77%)	$322,370
Nashville Arena	Nashville	9,663 / 12,000 (80%)	$298,718
Ice Palace	Tampa	10,999 / 14,660 (75%)	$447,219
BJCC Coliseum	Birmingham	9,205 / 12,000 (77%)	$341,685
TOTAL		273,194 / 299,490 (91%)	$11,689,176

== Band ==
- Musical Director: Bo Watson & Vance Taylor
- Drums: Stokley Williams
- Guitar: Homer O'Dell
- Bass: Ricky Kinchen
- Keyboards: Keri Lewis
- Saxophone: Jeffrey Allen
- Keyboards: Larry Waddell
- Percussion: Chris Dave
- Background vocals: Cha'n Andre', Dee Coupe, Valerie Davis, Julio Hanson, Dyron D. Wade, Gregory Ringo, Mario Johnson, Rodney Day, Gromyko Collins
- Dancers: Rosero McCoy, Jamal Sims, Omar Lopez, Jermaine Montell
