= Toni Braxton & Babyface Live =

2015 concert tour by Toni Braxton and Babyface

- Tour by Babyface & Toni Braxton
- Associated album: Love, Marriage & Divorce
- Start date: August 28, 2015
- End date: September 3, 2015
- Legs: 1
- No. of shows: 4 in Africa; 4 in total
Babyface tour chronology
Toni Braxton & Babyface Live (2015)
Toni Braxton tour chronology
2013 Summer Tour (2013)	Toni Braxton & Babyface Live (2015)	The Hits Tour (2016)

Toni Braxton & Babyface Live was a 4-day co-headlining concert tour in Africa by American recording artists Toni Braxton and Babyface, in support of their duet album, Love, Marriage & Divorce. The outing started on August 28, in Zimbabwe and ended on September 3, in Johannesburg. This marked the first time both singers embarked on a tour together. Highlights of the tour, included performing together their Grammy winning duet single "Hurt You".

== Set list ==
Babyface

1. "For the Cool in You"
2. "Every Time I Close My Eyes"
3. "Never Keeping Secrets"
4. "Soon as I Get Home"
5. "Slow Jams"
6. "Rocky Steady"
7. "Two Occasions"
8. "Whip Appeal"

Toni Braxton

1. "He Wasn't Man Enough"
2. "You're Makin' Me High"
3. "I Heart You"
4. "Seven Whole Days"
5. "You Mean the World to Me"
6. "Another Sad Love Song"
7. "Love Shoulda Brought You Home"
8. "Just Be a Man About It"
9. "Breathe Again"
10. "Hurt You" (performed with Babyface)
11. "Un-Break My Heart"

== Shows ==
Date	City	Country	Venue
Africa
August 28, 2015	Harare	Zimbabwe	Borrowdale Racecourse
August 30, 2015	Durban	South Africa	Moses Mabhida Stadium
September 1, 2015	Cape Town	South Africa	Grand Arena Grandwest
September 3, 2015	Johannesburg	South Africa	Ticketpro Dome
