= The Hits Tour (Toni Braxton) =

2016 concert tour by Toni Braxton

- Tour by Toni Braxton
- Start date: October 8, 2016
- End date: November 14, 2016
- Legs: 1
- No. of shows: 17 in North America

Toni Braxton concert chronology
- Toni Braxton & Babyface Live (2015); The Hits Tour (2016); As Long as I Live Tour (2019)

The Hits Tour was the fourth concert tour by American R&B/pop singer Toni Braxton. The 17-date outing kicked off on October 12 in Detroit, at the MotorCity Casino Hotel, visiting major cities in the United States, and completed its final night in Ohio on November 14, 2016. The tour featured R&B singer Ro James and select dates included special guests Joe, Tank and After 7.

== Background ==
Braxton announced she will start a US tour in the fall, performing in varies states, and will perform all of her chart-topping singles during The Hits Tour. Braxton shared the news via Instagram on July 25, which also included an additional link on her website with detailed information on dates and cities. Braxton says the 18-date tour will be "One unforgettable night of songs you love". The Hits Tour will arrive in her hometown of Baltimore, Maryland on October 29, at the Lyric Theater.

Originally the tour was set to start on October 8, 2016, but due to health issues, this date and October 9, 2016, were rescheduled for January 28 and 29, 2017. The tour will kick off in Detroit, will hits Baltimore and Houston among other cities, and will finish in Northfield, Ohio on November 14, 2016. "So excited to announce my new tour starting in October!" the Grammy-winning singer wrote on Instagram. "Can’t wait to see you all."

Originally the tour was set to finish on January 29, 2017, after rescheduling the original dates October 8 and 9, 2016 due to health issues. On December 1, 2016, Braxton announced a short statement via Twitter that the January dates for The Hits Tour had been cancelled, that a new album would be coming soon, and that she would be back touring in the summer: "Hey Guys, Unfortunately, Under doctor's recommendation, I'm going to have to cancel my shows in Oakland on January 28th and Los Angeles on January 29th, 2017. I'm feeling better and better every day and I want to be at my best when performing for you all. I'm excited to say that I will be completing my new record this spring / summer of 2017 and can't wait to share it with you. Stay tuned for more details. I look forward to seeing everyone back on tour in the summer of 2017!!!"

== Synopsis ==
Pre-sale and VIP tickets went on sale Wednesday July 27, 2016, and Thursday July 28, 2016. Standard tickets went on sale to the general public between Friday July 29, 2016, at 10 am and Saturday November 12, 2016, at 6 am. Standard ticket prices ranged from $50 - $90. VIP package prices ranged from $169 to $409. The age suitability was 21 and up for selected dates, with the event beginning between 7:00 and 9:00 at night.

Each event includes four different VIP Meet and Greet Packages. The VIP Ticket & Merch Package includes one premium reserved seat, one 8X10 photograph, one exclusive lyrical print, early entry, first access merchandise shopping and one commemorative VIP laminate. The Silver VIP Meet & Greet Experience includes one premium reserved seat in the first 7 rows, meet & greet with Toni Braxton, an individual photo with Toni Braxton, one autographed 8x10 photograph, one exclusive signed lyrical print, early entry, first access merchandise shopping and one commemorative VIP laminate.

The Gold VIP Meet & Greet Experience includes one premium seat within the first 2 rows, Meet & Greet with Toni Braxton, individual photograph with Toni Braxton, intimate Q&A with Toni Braxton, one autographed 8x10 photograph, one exclusive signed lyrical print, one scented candle (scent chosen by Toni Braxton exclusive to VIP buyers), early entry, first access merchandise shopping and one commemorative VIP laminate. The Ultimate On-Stage VIP Experience includes one first row seat to the event, watch Toni Braxton’s set from your own seat on stage, Meet & Greet with Toni Braxton, individual photograph with Toni Braxton, intimate Q&A with Toni Braxton, one autographed 8x10 photograph, one exclusive signed lyrical print, one scented candle (scent chosen by Toni Braxton exclusive to VIP buyers), early entry, first access merchandise shopping and one commemorative VIP laminate. On October 11, 2016, it was announced that the first show was sold out.

== Opening acts ==
- Ro James

== Set list ==
The following setlist is from the concert held at Sprint Center, in Kansas City, Missouri. It does not represent all shows during the tour.

1. "Un-Break My Heart"
2. "Love Shoulda Brought You Home"
3. "Breathe Again"
4. "Another Sad Love Song"
5. "Seven Whole Days"
6. "Just Be a Man About It"
7. "Yesterday"
8. "You Mean the World to Me"
9. "Spanish Guitar"
10. "I Wish"
11. "How Could an Angel Break My Heart"
12. "Let It Flow"
13. "I Love Me Some Him"
14. "How Many Ways"
15. "You're Makin' Me High"
16. "He Wasn't Man Enough"

== Shows ==
Date	City	Country	Venue	Special guest(s)
North America
October 12, 2016	Detroit	United States	MotorCity Casino Hotel	
October 14, 2016	Kansas City	United States	Sprint Center	After 7, Ro James
October 16, 2016	Chicago	United States	Arie Crown Theater	Joe, Ro James
October 20, 2016	Tupelo	United States	BancorpSouth Arena	Tank
October 21, 2016	Tunica	United States	Horseshoe Tunica	Ro James
October 22, 2016	Savannah	United States	Johnny Mercer Theatre	Ro James
October 26, 2016	Hollywood	United States	Seminole Hard Rock Casino	Ro James
October 28, 2016	Charles Town	United States	Hollywood Casino at Charles Town	Ro James
October 29, 2016	Baltimore	United States	Lyric Theatre	Ro James
October 30, 2016	New Brunswick	United States	State Theatre	Ro James
November 2, 2016	San Antonio	United States	Tobin Center for the Performing Arts	Ro James
November 4, 2016	Houston	United States	Arena Theatre	Ro James
November 5, 2016	Thackerville	United States	WinStar World Casino	Ro James
November 9, 2016	Englewood	United States	Bergen Performing Arts Center	Ro James
November 10, 2016	Westbury	United States	NYCB Theatre at Westbury	Ro James
November 12, 2016	Atlantic City	United States	Circus Maximus	Ro James
November 14, 2016	Northfield	United States	Hard Rock Live	Ro James

== Cancelled and rescheduled shows ==
October 8, 2016	Oakland, California	Paramount Theatre	Rescheduled for January 28, 2017, canceled, due to health issues.
October 9, 2016	Los Angeles, California	Microsoft Theater	Rescheduled for January 29, 2017, canceled, due to health issues.
October 16, 2016	Northfield, Ohio	Hard Rock Live	Rescheduled to November 14, 2016, due to health issues.
