= Please (Toni Braxton song) =

Single by Toni Braxton

from the album Libra
- Released: May 30, 2005
- Studio: The Hit Factory Criteria (Miami, Florida)
- Genre: R&B; hip hop
- Length: 3:59
- Label: Blackground
- Songwriters: Scott Storch; Makeba Riddick; Vincent Herbert; Kameron Houff
- Producer: Scott Storch

Toni Braxton singles chronology
| "Hit the Freeway" (2002) | "Please" (2005) | "Trippin' (That's the Way Love Works)" (2005) |

"Please" is a song by American singer Toni Braxton. It was written by Scott Storch, Makeba Riddick, Vincent Herbert, and Kameron Houff for Braxton's sixth studio album, Libra (2005), while production was chiefly helmed by Storch. One out of several songs on the album to feature a more hard-edged production, "Please" is a spare, mid-tempo R&B and hip hop song with a heavy bottom and zippy strings. Lyrically, it talks about how to handle a temptation in a relationship.

The track was released as the album's lead single to US rhythmic and urban AC radio formats on May 30, 2005 by Blackground Records. "Please" reached number thirty-six on Billboard's Hot R&B/Hip-Hop Songs chart and number four on the Bubbling Under Hot 100 Singles chart. "Please" was the only single from Libra for which a music video, directed by Chris Robinson, was shot.

== Background ==
In September 2002, while gearing up for the release of her album More Than a Woman, Braxton discovered she was pregnant with her second child and she was subsequently forced to cancel many scheduled performances due to complications. Executives at Arista Records were reportedly frustrated with the timing of her second pregnancy since it prevented her from doing the extensive promotion for More Than A Woman, and though Braxton asked to push the album's release to 2003, the label refused. Released in November 2002, More Than A Woman garnered lackluster sales and failed to produce a hit single. Disappointed by its performance, which Braxton attributed to the little promotion activities that the Arista management had arranged for her due to her second pregnancy, she requested her manager Barry Hankerson to obtain a release for her from any future recording obligations to the label.

In March 2003, Braxton issued a press statement saying she was leaving Arista for Hankerson's Universal-distributed Blackground Records. Soon after, she began recording her Blackground debut with her then-husband Keri Lewis. The pair worked on several tracks for Libra, about seven or eight songs which made the first record they turned in to Blackground and requested the singer to make significant changes to Libra, prompting them to book additional recording sessions with producers, including musician Scott Storch, to place it in more hard-edged productions.

== Composition and lyrics ==
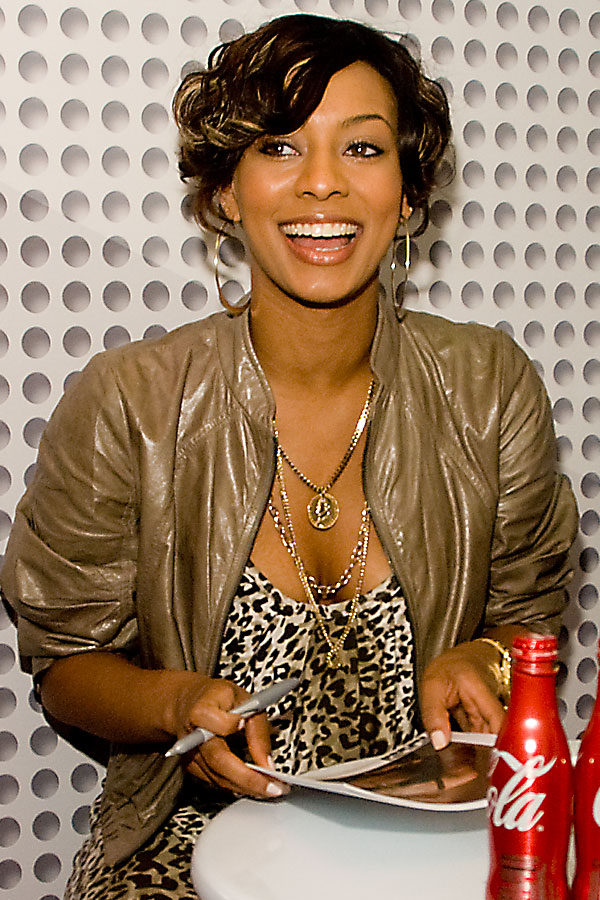
R&B singer Keri Hilson provided background vocals on "Please".

"Please" was written by Storch along with Makeba Riddick, Kameron Houff, and Vincent Herbert, with production being handled by Storch. A frequent collaborator, Herbert had co-written and produced her 1994 hit "How Many Ways. Vocal production was overseen by Keri Lewis, while Braxton's younger sister Tamar, Riddick, Kim Johnson and Keri Hilson all provided background vocals on "Please". Musically, "Please" is an upbeat R&B and hip-hop song that talks about how to handle a temptation in a relationship. Braxton starts the song singing, "I know you watching all over here, trying to find a way to come into my situation, because you should know that it is so good to be cool."

== Release and reception ==
In May 2005, MTV News reported that a new single by Braxton was coming and that the song was produced by Scott Storch. On May 30, 2005, "Please" was released to US rhythmic and urban AC radio formats. While a promotional CD was released during 2005, Blackground and its distributor Universal Records produced no physical CD single in support of the "Please". In Europe, a different promo CD was also released. To promote the single, Braxton visited The Ellen Show where she performed "Please" along with her sisters. She also performed the song on the Tom Joyner Morning Show and on Live with Regis and Kelly. In concert, Braxton performed the song on her 2006 Libra Tour and her 2013 Summer Tour, in a groove-oriented medley with fellow Libra single "Take This Ring."

Upon its release, the song received generally mixed reviews from music critics. The Baltimore Sun found that the song "hasn't exactly been a runaway hit." Sal Cinquemani of Slant Magazine called it "forgettable," and wrote that it "picks up where the edgy More Than a Woman left off." Allmusic editor Andy Kellman picked "Please" as a standout track of Libra. Commercially, "Please" only charted inside the top-forty on the R&B/Hip-Hop Songs chart, topping the Billboard's Bubbling Under R&B/Hip-Hop Singles chart and later debuting at number 78 on the Hot R&B/Hip-Hop Songs chart. Later, the song climbed to number 40, before peaking at number 36. It marked Braxton's lowest-charting lead single then.

== Music video ==
An accompanying music video for the song, directed by Chris Robinson, was released in late June 2005. It features Braxton wearing different clothes and wigs, while also dancing with backup dancers.

== Track listing ==
Promo single
| No. | Title | Length |
|---|---|---|
| 1. | "Please" (Album Version) | 3:58 |
| 2. | "Please" (Instrumental) | 3:58 |
| 3. | "Please" (Call Out Hook) | 0:18 |

== Personnel ==
Credits adapted from liner notes of Libra.

- Toni Braxton – vocals, backing vocals
- Tamar Braxton – backing vocals
- Chris Gehringer – mastering
- Keri Hilson – backing vocals
- Kameron Houff – engineer
- Kim Johnson – backing vocals
- Keri Lewis – vocal producer
- Makeba Riddick – backing vocals
- Dave "Natural Love" Russell – mixing
- Scott Storch – producer

== Charts ==
Chart performance for "Please"
| Chart (2005) | Peak position |
|---|---|
| CIS Airplay (TopHit) | 199 |
| Netherlands (Urban Top 100) | 53 |
| US Adult R&B Songs (Billboard) | 7 |
| US Bubbling Under Hot 100 (Billboard) | 4 |
| US Hot R&B/Hip-Hop Songs (Billboard) | 36 |

== Release history ==
Release dates and format(s) for "Please"
| Region | Date | Format(s) | Label(s) | Ref. |
|---|---|---|---|---|
| United States | May 30, 2005 | Rhythmic contemporary radio | Blackground | |
| United States | May 30, 2005 | Urban adult contemporary radio | Blackground | |
| United States | August 8, 2005 | Contemporary hit radio | Blackground | |
| United States | August 8, 2005 | Adult contemporary radio | Blackground | |
