= List of awards and nominations received by Toni Braxton =

This is a list of awards and nominations received by Toni Braxton, an American R&B/pop singer.

== American Music Awards ==
Year	Nominee / work	Award	Result
1994	Toni Braxton	Favorite Adult Contemporary New Artist	Won
1994	Toni Braxton	Favorite Soul/R&B New Artist	Won
1994	Toni Braxton	Favorite Soul/R&B Female Artist	Nominated
1995	Toni Braxton	Favorite Soul/R&B Female Artist	Nominated
1995	Toni Braxton	Favorite Soul/R&B Album	Won
1997	Secrets	Favorite Soul/R&B Album	Won
1997	Toni Braxton	Favorite Soul/R&B Female Artist	Won
1998	Toni Braxton	Favorite Soul/R&B Female Artist	Nominated
1998	Toni Braxton	Favorite Pop/Rock Female Artist	Nominated
2001	Toni Braxton	Favorite Soul/R&B Female Artist	Won
2001	The Heat	Favorite Soul/R&B Album	Won

== Billboard Music Awards ==
Year	Category	Result
1996	Best R&B Single ("You're Makin' Me High")	Won
1997	R&B Artist of the Year, Female	Won
1997	Adult Contemporary Artist of the Year, Female	Won
1997	Adult Contemporary Single of the Year ("Un-Break My Heart")	Won
2000	R&B Artist of the Year, Female	Won

== BRIT Awards ==
Year	Nominee / work	Award	Result
1997	Toni Braxton	Best International Female	Nominated

== Echo Awards ==
Year	Nominee / work	Award	Result
1998	Toni Braxton	Best International Pop/Rock Female Artist	Won

== End of the Year Billboard history ==
1994

- Top R&B Artist – Female (singles & albums)
- Top R&B Album Artist – Female

1997

- Top Hot 100 Singles Artist – Female
- Top R&B Artist – Female (singles & albums)
- Top Hot R&B Singles Artist – Female
- Top Hot Dance Club Play Artist
- Top Hot Dance Club Play Single (Un-break My Heart)
- Top Hot Adult Contemporary Artist
- Top Hot Adult Contemporary Track (Un-Break My Heart)

2000

- Top R&B/Hip-Hop Artist – Female
- Top R&B/Hip-Hop Album Artist – Female,
- Top Hot R&B/Hip-Hop Singles & Tracks Artist – Female

== Grammy Awards ==
The Grammy Awards are awarded annually by the National Academy of Recording Arts and Sciences. Braxton has won seven awards from thirteen nominations, including Best New Artist.

Year	Nominee / work	Award	Result
1994	Toni Braxton	Best New Artist	Won
1994	"Another Sad Love Song"	Best R&B Vocal Performance, Female	Won
1995	"Breathe Again"	Best Female R&B Vocal Performance	Won
1996	"I Belong to You"	Best Female R&B Vocal Performance	Nominated
1997	"You're Makin' Me High"	Best Female R&B Vocal Performance	Won
1997	"Un-Break My Heart"	Best Female Pop Vocal Performance	Won
1997	Secrets	Best Pop Vocal Album	Nominated
2001	"He Wasn't Man Enough"	Best Female R&B Vocal Performance	Won
2001	The Heat	Best R&B Album	Nominated
2015	Love, Marriage & Divorce (with Babyface)	Best R&B Album	Won
2019	Sex & Cigarettes	Best R&B Album	Nominated
2019	"Long as I Live"	Best R&B Performance	Nominated
2019	"Long as I Live"	Best R&B Song	Nominated

== MTV Europe Music Awards ==
Year	Nominee / work	Award	Result
1996	Toni Braxton	Best Female	Nominated
1997	Toni Braxton	Best Female	Nominated
1997	Toni Braxton	Best R&B	Nominated

== MTV Video Music Awards ==
Year	Nominee / work	Award	Result
1994	"Breathe Again"	Best R&B Video	Nominated
1996	"You're Makin' Me High"	Best R&B Video	Nominated
1997	"Un-Break My Heart"	Best R&B Video	Nominated
1997	"Un-Break My Heart"	Best Female Video	Nominated
2000	"He Wasn't Man Enough"	Best Female Video	Nominated
2000	"He Wasn't Man Enough"	Best R&B Video	Nominated

== NAACP Image Awards ==
Year	Nominee / work	Award	Result
1994	Toni Braxton	Outstanding Female Artist	Nominated
1997	Toni Braxton	Outstanding Female Artist	Won
1997	"Un-Break My Heart"	Outstanding Music Video	Nominated
2001	Toni Braxton	Outstanding Female Artist	Nominated
2006	Toni Braxton	Outstanding Female Artist	Nominated
2015	Toni Braxton and Babyface	Outstanding Duo or Group	Nominated
2015	Love, Marriage & Divorce	Outstanding Album	Nominated
2019	Toni Braxton	Outstanding Actress in a Television Movie, Limited-Series or Dramatic Special	Nominated
2019	"Long as I Live"	Outstanding Song – Traditional	Won
2021	"Live Out Your Love"	Outstanding Duo or Group or Collaboration (Traditional)	Nominated

== Soul Train Music Awards ==
Year	Nominee / work	Award	Result
1993	"Love Shoulda Brought You Home"	Best R&B/Soul Single, Female	Nominated
1994	Toni Braxton	Best R&B Album of the Year, Female	Won
1994	"Breathe Again"	Best R&B/Soul Song of the Year	Nominated
1994	"Breathe Again"	Best R&B/Soul Music Video	Nominated
1994	"Breathe Again"	Best R&B/Soul Single, Female	Won
1995	"You Mean the World to Me"	Best R&B/Soul Single, Female	Nominated
1997	"You're Makin' Me High/Let It Flow"	Best R&B/Soul Single, Female	Won
1997	Secrets	Best R&B Album of the Year, Female	Won
2001	The Heat	Best R&B Album of the Year, Female	Nominated
2017	Toni Braxton	Legend Award	Won

== VH1/Vogue Fashion Awards ==
Year	Nominee / work	Award	Result
2000	Toni Braxton	Most Fashionable Female Artist	Nominated
