= Voices from the FIFA World Cup =

Compilation album by Various Artists
- Released: June 6, 2006
- Genre: Pop
- Label: Sony BMG

Various Artists chronology
The Official Album of the 2002 FIFA World Cup (2002)	Voices from the FIFA World Cup (2006)	Listen Up! The Official 2010 FIFA World Cup Album (2010)

Singles from Voices from the FIFA World Cup
- 1. "Celebrate the Day" Released: 1 June 2006; 2. "The Time of Our Lives" Released: 9 June 2006

Professional ratings
Review scores
Source	Rating
Allmusic	2/5 stars

Voices from the FIFA World Cup is a compilation album with various artists, released on June 6, 2006 by Sony BMG. This album is the official music album of the 2006 FIFA World Cup in Germany.

== Track listing (International) ==
Disc 1

1. "The Time of Our Lives" - Il Divo and Toni Braxton (The Official 2006 FIFA World Cup Song)
2. "Hips Don't Lie" (Bamboo) (2006 FIFA World Cup Mix) - Shakira featuring Wyclef Jean
3. "Your Song" - Elton John
4. "Thank You" - Dido
5. "Woman in Love" - Barbra Streisand
6. "Because Of You" - Kelly Clarkson
7. "Truly Madly Deeply" - Savage Garden
8. "Why" - Annie Lennox
9. "Just the Way You Are" - Billy Joel
10. "Hero" - Mariah Carey
11. "I'll Stand By You" - The Pretenders
12. "Reach" - Gloria Estefan

Disc 2

1. "Will You Be There" - Michael Jackson
2. "Free Your Mind" - En Vogue
3. "By Your Side" - Sade
4. "I Believe In You" - Il Divo and Celine Dion
5. "Bridge Over Troubled Water" - Simon & Garfunkel
6. "Un-Break My Heart" - Toni Braxton
7. "Ev'ry Time We Say Goodbye" - Rod Stewart
8. "Bad Day" - Daniel Powter
9. "Wind Beneath My Wings" - Bette Midler
10. "One Moment in Time" - Whitney Houston
11. "Always on My Mind" - Elvis Presley
12. "Celebrate the Day (Zeit, Dass Sich Was Dreht, in Germany, Switzerland, Liechtenstein and Austria)" - Herbert Grönemeyer and Amadou et Mariam (The Official 2006 FIFA World Cup Anthem)

Bonus tracks:

1. "Earth Song" - Michael Jackson
2. "Praying for time" - George Michael
3. "Wonderwall" - Oasis
4. "You Raise Me Up" - Westlife
5. "Born to Try" - Delta Goodrem
6. "Here's to the Heroes" - Kane Alexander
7. "One Day in Your Life" - Anastacia
8. "Believer" - Rogue Traders
9. "Learn to Fly" - Shannon Noll
10. "I Believe I Can Fly" - R. Kelly
11. "Another Day in Paradise" - Phil Collins
12. "Private Emotion" - Ricky Martin
13. "Rush" - Aly & AJ
14. "Let's Do It Again" - TLC
15. "Maria Maria" - Carlos Santana
16. "Nessun dorma" - Amici Forever
17. "Più bella cosa" - Eros Ramazzotti
18. "You and Me" - Lifehouse
19. "If I Ain't Got You" - Alicia Keys
20. "Sunrise" - Simply Red
21. "7 Seconds" - Youssou N'Dour feat Neneh Cherry
22. "The Closest Thing to Crazy" - Katie Melua
23. "Life" - Des'ree
24. "Shiver" - Natalie Imbruglia
25. "Your Game" - Will Young
26. "Everyday" - Bon Jovi
27. "Elevation" - U2

== Chart positions ==
Country	Chart Position
Germany	6
Switzerland	8
Norway	16
Austria	24

== See also ==
- List of FIFA World Cup songs and anthems
