= Tout près du bonheur =

Single by Marc Dupré and Celine Dion

from the album Refaire le monde
- Language: French
- Released: 11 April 2006
- Studio: Blueroom Inc; Piccolo (Las Vegas)
- Genre: Pop
- Length: 3:59 (album version); 3:51 (radio remix)
- Label: Novem Musique
- Songwriters: Nelson Minville; Marc Dupré; Celine Dion
- Producer: Tino Izzo

Celine Dion singles chronology
"Tous les secrets" (2006)	"Tout près du bonheur" (2006)	"I Believe in You (Je crois en toi)" (2006)

Music video
- "Tout près du bonheur" on YouTube

"Tout près du bonheur" (lit. 'So close to happiness') is a duet between Marc Dupré and Celine Dion, released as a digital download on 11 April 2006 in Quebec, Canada. It is the fourth single from Dupré's debut album, Refaire le monde, issued on 18 October 2005.

== Background and release ==
"Tout près du bonheur" was composed in 2000 by Dion for the wedding of Dupré and Anne-Marie Angelil, and she performed it after the ceremony. While recording his debut album in 2005, Dupré asked Dion for permission to include the song. She agreed and recorded background vocals. The track was produced by Tino Izzo. Dupré later wrote music for "On s'est aimé à cause", included on Dion's 2007 album D'elles, which was also produced by Izzo.

Dupré had worked with Dion before. He opened her concerts at the Olympia in Paris in 1994, and in April 2002 they performed a live duet of "Sous le vent" on the Quebec karaoke game show La fureur, held at the Bell Centre in Montreal and broadcast on Canadian Broadcasting Corporation.

Two studio versions of "Tout près du bonheur" were recorded. The first appears on Dupré's 2005 album. The second, a rock version, was issued as a radio single and digital download in Quebec in 2006. A third version exists only as a live performance. It was sung by both artists on 30 April 2006 at the Gala Artists in Quebec and included an expanded vocal part from Dion (a full second verse). On 22 December 2006, Dion and Dupré performed this version again during his concert at the Lionel-Groulx Theater in Sainte-Thérèse, Quebec, and later during Dion's performance before 250,000 spectators celebrating Quebec's 400th anniversary, which was included on the Céline sur les Plaines DVD. The promotional CD single contains a radio remix and a rock remix.

== Commercial performance ==
"Tout près du bonheur" topped the Quebec radio charts in June 2006 for three consecutive weeks.

== Music video ==
The music video was originally planned to be filmed in the Mojave Desert in Nevada, but because of Dion's health condition it was shot at The Colosseum at Caesars Palace on 8 May 2006 and directed by Ivan Grbovic.

== Accolades ==
On 23 October 2006, Dion and Dupré received a SOCAN Award as composers of "Tout près du bonheur".

== Charts ==
Chart performance
Chart (2006)	Peak position
Quebec Radio Songs (ADISQ)	1
