= Libra (Toni Braxton album) =

Studio album by Toni Braxton
- Released: September 27, 2005
- Recorded: 2003–2004
- Studios: The Hit Factory Criteria (Miami) (Note: Track 1); Doppler (Atlanta) (Note: Track 2); Upstairs (Atlanta) (Note: Tracks 2 and 3); Encore (Burbank, California) (Note: Track 4); Soulpower (Los Angeles) (Note: Track 5); Ocean Way (Los Angeles); The Underlab (Los Angeles) (Note: Tracks 6, 7 and 9); Silent Sound (Atlanta) (Note: Track 7); The Village (Los Angeles) (Note: Tracks 8 and 10); The Poolhouse (New York City) (Note: Track 8); DenDiezel (Los Angeles); Westlake Recording (Daly City, California) (Note: Overdubs on track 10)
- Genres: R&B; pop; soul
- Length: 40:00
- Labels: Blackground; Universal
- Producers: Keri Lewis; Babyface; Bryan-Michael Cox; Antonio Dixon; Rich Harrison; Steve Mac; Richard Marx; Cory Rooney; Dan Shea; Soulshock & Karlin; Scott Storch; The Underdogs

Toni Braxton chronology
Breathe Again: Toni Braxton at Her Best (2005)	Libra (2005)	The Essential Toni Braxton (2007)

Singles from Libra
- 1. "Please" Released: May 30, 2005; 2. "Trippin' (That's the Way Love Works)" Released: September 26, 2005; 3. "Take This Ring" Released: December 2005; 4. "Suddenly" Released: February 2006; 5. "The Time of Our Lives" Released: June 15, 2006

Libra is the sixth studio album by American singer Toni Braxton, released on September 27, 2005, by Blackground Records and Universal Records. It marked Braxton's debut on the label, following her split with longtime record company Arista Records in 2003 after the release of her album More Than a Woman (2002), which was commercially less successful than its predecessors. The album's title is a reference to Braxton's astrological sign, Libra.

Upon its release, the album debuted at number four on the Billboard 200 and at number two on the Top R&B/Hip-Hop Albums album, selling 114,000 copies in its first week. It has been certified gold by the Recording Industry Association of America (RIAA) on November 4, 2005, having sold over 441,000 copies in the United States to date. Singles such as "Please" and "Trippin' (That's the Way Love Works)" failed to sell or chart noticeably on both the pop and the R&B charts, although "The Time of Our Lives", Braxton's collaboration with the group Il Divo for the 2006 FIFA World Cup, prompted her German label Edel Records to re-release the album in continental Europe in June 2006.

In August 2021, Blackground rebranded as Blackground 2.0, with Barry Hankerson remaining as founder. Blackground 2.0 signed a distribution deal with Empire Distribution, which will re-release the label's catalogue onto digital download sites and streaming services for the first time ever, including Libra.

== Background ==
In 1992, Braxton signed a solo recording contract with LaFace Records, a joint venture between the producing duo Antonio "L.A." Reid and Kenneth "Babyface" Edmonds from former recording group the Deele, and distributor Arista Records. Her subsequently released first two albums Toni Braxton (1993) and Secrets (1996) became critical and commercial hits and sold a combined 21 million copies, earning $170 million in worldwide sales. By late 1996, Braxton was still waiting for fair financial rewards. Her recording contract with LaFace was substantially below those of other recording artists and bound her to refund all kinds of expenses the label had financed in advance. In December 1997, after learning that she had accumulated more than $1 million in debts, Braxton became embroiled in a legal dispute with LaFace, when she filed a lawsuit asking to be freed from her long-term contractual obligations to the label. After then being counter-sued by the label for breach of contract, the singer eventually filed for bankruptcy protection in 1998. In 1999, Braxton mended her relationship with LaFace and the lawsuit was settled. Soon thereafter, she released her third album The Heat (2000). A breakaway from the ballad-heavy and adult contemporary-oriented material on her previous albums, it sold four million copies worldwide and spawned the commercially successful, Grammy Award-winning single "He Wasn't Man Enough."

The following year, Braxton released the Christmas album Snowflakes (2001) and began work on her next album More Than a Woman. A continuation of The Heat, it saw her reteaming with a variety of hip-hop producers and rappers such as Irv Gotti, the Neptunes, Mannie Fresh, and Loon in favor of a "harder sound." In September 2002, while gearing up for the release of the album, Braxton discovered she was pregnant with her second child and she was subsequently forced to cancel many scheduled performances due to complications. Executives at Arista Records were reportedly frustrated with the timing of her second pregnancy since it prevented her from doing the extensive promotion for More Than A Woman, and though Braxton asked to push the album's release to 2003, the label refused. Released in November 2002, More Than A Woman garnered lackluster sales and failed to produce a hit single. Disappointed by its underperformance, which Braxton attributed to the little promotion activities that the Arista management had arranged for her due to her second pregnancy, she requested her manager Barry Hankerson to obtain a release for her from any future recording obligations to the label, and in March 2003, Braxton issued a press statement saying she was leaving Arista for Hankerson's Universal-distributed Blackground Records.

== Recording and conception ==
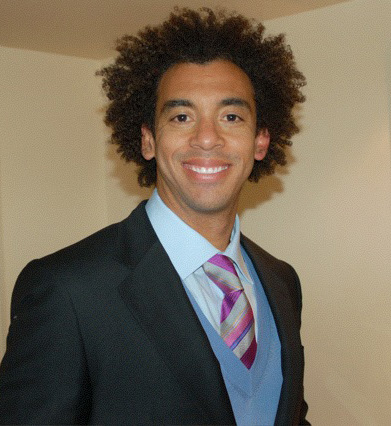
Blackground consulted Harvey Mason Jr. of the Underdogs to work with Braxton on Libra.

Breaking away from her usual formula which saw her setting up projects with a variety of music producers, Braxton began recording her Blackground Records debut exclusively with husband Keri Lewis, who she had married in 2001. The former Mint Condition member had been involved to varying degrees in all of Braxton's three prior albums, also serving as an executive producer alongside Braxton and L.A. Reid on previous effort More Than a Woman (2002). Together, the pair worked on several tracks for Libra, about seven or eight songs which made the first record they turned in to Blackground and was majorly done by her and Lewis. However, Universal Records, Blackground's distributor in the United States at this time, was reportedly dissatisfied with the material and refused to consider releasing it. Similarly, Blackground's international partners questioned the commercial appeal of the couple's ballad-heavy work. While Braxton insisted on Lewis' further involvement with the album, Blackground CEO Barry Hankerson requested the singer to make significant changes to Libra, prompting them to book additional recording sessions with producers such as Scott Storch, Rich Harrison and the Underdogs to place it in more hard-edged productions.

Commenting on the album's modification process, Braxton expressed her uncertainty about whether her music should follow trends. With the record company trying to make her sound more commercially viable, she felt pressured to approach a more uptempo, hip-hop-oriented sound with the songs. In an interview with The Baltimore Sun, Braxton admitted that she was forced to put her artistry on the back burner to be more commercial on some songs: "We tried to be clever and incorporate new sounds in my old sound. It was hard at first", she said, though she also conceded: "I do wish the album had a few more slow songs. Overall, I'm satisfied." While promoting Libra, she further elaborated on how her cast as a particular sort of artist influenced the genre of the album: "I'm trying to incorporate my style and still make it current, which is really, really hard with a lot of things being so hip-hop [...] When you're an African American artist, you're R&B and hip-hop, and so that's the category they put you in based on your color first. So how do I do my mainstream style of music, still be who I am without being hip-hop? Because there's not a hip-hop bone in my body." With Braxton also experiencing a happy family life during the album's production, she became less involved with the songwriting on the album: "They like [to] hear a little bit more controversy, and that's not necessarily my lifestyle [...] I don't have to be seen at every party, because that's not me. I'm not an industry person. I'm not a taste-maker person. I just make a living at singing. So it's what I love. But the after-party thing, they pretty much gotta make me go."

The album was pulled from streaming services on an unknown date. However, Blackground Records, the label Libra was released on would be revived in August 2021. It was later announced that the album, along with the rest of their missing albums would be put on streaming services, with Libra being re-released on October 1, 2021.

== Songs ==
The album's first track and lead-single "Please" is produced by Scott Storch and it's an arresting danceable ballad recalling the glory moments of her early days. The second track, the ballad "Trippin' (That's the Way Love Works)", is sung in a rapping way, with fast talking where the melody isn't lost and harmonizing is inserted at the right moments. The album's third track "What's Good" is a decidedly traditional ballad, Isley Brothers-esque throwback and uses a clip from Joe Sample's "In My Wildest Dreams". The fourth track "Take This Ring" produced by Rich Harrison, is an upbeat heavily percussion driven record. An aggressive song that is balanced by well managed vocal arrangements led by unapologetic lyrics. It was compared to Amerie's 1 Thing, also produced by Harrison. It has drum-and-bass-heavy accusational fire.

"Suddenly", which only appears on the European edition of the album, is a relatively jazzy track. It's easily comparable to How Could an Angel Break My Heart" and it features the trumpeter Chris Botti. "I Wanna Be (Your Baby)" is a ballad written by Babyface and Daryl Simmon. "Sposed to Be" is a "tranquil song" with a finger snapping groove. The self-recriminating "Stupid" was compared to the work of Anita Baker. "Finally" makes lyrical references to past hits like "Breathe Again". "Shadowless" is an acoustic guitar ballad in which she sings about a love lost and a plea to win it back.

== Critical reception ==
Professional ratings
Review scores
Source	Rating
AllMusic	3/5 stars
Entertainment Weekly	B+
People	3/4 stars
Slant Magazine	2.5/5 stars
Sputnikmusic	3.5/5 stars
USA Today	3/4 stars

Upon release, Libra earned generally mixed reviews from music critics, who complimented Braxton vocal performance and her return to form on the album's ballads, but were critical towards its uptempo material. In his review for USA Today, Steve Jones noted that Libra broadens "her perspective while growing increasingly feisty [...] Still, the more mature Braxton is no longer waiting around for someone else to un-break her heart." Sputnikmusic was very positive with Libra, finding it "rich with serene mellow tunes", while declaring it "an album worthy of a place in your R&B collection." People called it "sumptuous", complimenting its balance between contemporary R&B and Braxton's "own classic sound." He added that she "is still at her husky-voiced best on signature slow jams." Margeaux Watson, writing for Vibe Vixen, compared Libra to Mariah Carey's highly successful comeback album The Emancipation of Mimi (2005) and summed the album as a "welcome return to form."

AllMusic editor Andy Kellman felt that "Libra offers no surprises. It's lean and balanced, just like all other Braxton albums, though too many songs are tepid and merely functional for background listening, so it winds up a safe distance from the likes of the self-titled debut and Secrets." Similarly, Billboard wrote that the album "finds the singer doing what she does best: tapping into her R&B siren muse. Braxton still owns the road when it comes to slow jams [but] it's when she veers into the fast lane that things become a little uneven." In a mixed review, Sal Cinquemani of Slant Magazine wrote that "while Braxton meshed impeccably with her hip-hop counterparts on More Than A Woman, her collaboration with Rich Harrison sounds forced, even desperate. And with the Babyface and Daryl Simmons-penned "I Wanna Be (Your Baby)", the team that once delivered multiple R&B classics all on one Braxton record struggles to produce just one for their old friend here."

== Commercial performance ==
Libra debuted at number four on the US Billboard 200 for the issue dated ending October 5, with 114,000 copies sold. Braxton's fourth top-five entry, it marked a significant lift for the singer, whose previous release More Than a Woman (2002) had opened at number 13 with first-week sales of 98,000 copies. In addition, Libra opened at number two on Billboard's Top R&B/Hip-Hop Albums chart. The album sold 355,000 copies within its first five months on release, and has since sold 441,000 units in the United States. On November 4, 2005, it was certified gold by the Recording Industry Association of America (RIAA) for the shipments in excess of 500,000 copies in the United States.

The album would remain Braxton's only release with Blackground Records. In January 2007, she sued label head Barry Hankerson, claiming that he owed her at least $10 million for maneuvering to have her abandon her longtime relationship with Arista and jump to his own record label. He reportedly duped Braxton into signing a multi-album deal with Blackground, only to deprive the singer of her rights under the recording agreement by failing to send her accounting statements and by lying about deals he had made. The lawsuit was settled in February 2007 after Braxton's agreed on returning a $375,000 advance and paying royalties from her next album to Hankerson. In a 2012 interview with ABC News, Braxton expressed discontentment with the project when asked about the commercial failure of her albums from the mid-to-late 2000s, including Libra: "Those albums – that's like that one-night stand that you don't want to talk about," she said. "You don't want anyone to know about those records that didn't do well. I had a few of those. Definitely a few."

== Track listing ==
Standard edition
No.	Title	Writer(s)	Producer(s)	Length
1.	"Please"	Scott Storch; Makeba Riddick; Vincent Herbert; Kameron Houff	Storch; Keri Lewis^{[a]}	3:57
2.	"Trippin' (That's the Way Love Works)"	Bryan-Michael Cox; Kendrick Dean; Johntá Austin; Toni Braxton	Cox; Lewis^{[b]}; Kendrick "WyldCard" Dean^{[c]}	4:05
3.	"What's Good"	Cox; Austin; Braxton; Joe Sample	Cox; Lewis^{[b]}	4:14
4.	"Take This Ring"	Rich Harrison	Harrison	4:35
5.	"Midnite"	Soulshock; Kenneth Karlin; Harold Lilly	Soulshock & Karlin	4:11
6.	"I Wanna Be (Your Baby)"	Harvey Mason Jr.; Damon Thomas; Kenneth Edmonds; Daryl Simmons	The Underdogs; Babyface	3:48
7.	"Sposed to Be"	Antonio Dixon; Keri Lynn Hilson; J. Que; Mason; Thomas	Dixon; Lewis^{[a]}	4:07
8.	"Stupid"	Cory Rooney; Braxton; Lewis	Rooney; Lewis; Dan Shea	3:36
9.	"Finally"	Mason; Thomas; Dixon; Eric Dawkins; Durrell Babbs	Dixon; Lewis^{[a]}; Dawkins^{[a]}	3:30
10.	"Shadowless"	Alex Cantrall; Phillip White	Lewis	3:57

Walmart bonus track
No.	Title	Writer(s)	Producer(s)	Length
11.	"Places"	Schack; Karlin; Cantrell; Lindy Robbins; Robert Math	Soulshock & Karlin	4:02

Circuit City digital download bonus track
No.	Title	Writer(s)	Producers(s)	Length
11.	"Happily Unhappy"	James Harris III; Terry Lewis; Braxton	Jimmy Jam & Terry Lewis	6:18

European edition
No.	Title	Writer(s)	Producer(s)	Length
1.	"Please"	Storch; Riddick; Herbert; Houff	Storch; Lewis^{[a]}	3:57
2.	"Trippin' (That's the Way Love Works)"	Cox; Dean; Austin; Braxton	Cox; Lewis^{[b]}; Dean^{[c]}	4:05
3.	"What's Good"	Cox; Austin; Braxton; Sample	Cox; Lewis^{[b]}	4:14
4.	"Suddenly"	Richard Marx	Marx	4:43
5.	"Take This Ring"	Harrison	Harrison	4:35
6.	"Midnite"	Schack; Karlin; Lilly	Soulshock & Karlin	4:11
7.	"I Wanna Be (Your Baby)"	Mason; Thomas; Edmonds; Simmons	The Underdogs; Babyface	3:48
8.	"Sposed to Be"	Dixon; Hilson; Smith; Mason; Thomas	Dixon; Lewis^{[a]}	4:07
9.	"Stupid"	Rooney; Braxton; Lewis	Rooney; Lewis; Shea	3:36
10.	"Finally"	Mason; Thomas; Dixon; Dawkins; Babbs	Dixon; Lewis^{[a]}; Dawkins^{[a]}	3:30
11.	"I Hate You"	Mason; Thomas; Dixon; Dawkins; Edmonds	The Underdogs	4:01
12.	"Shadowless"	Cantrell; White	Lewis	3:57
13.	"Long Way Home"	Schack; Karlin; Cantrell; White	Soulshock & Karlin	4:32

European reissue bonus track
No.	Title	Writer(s)	Producer(s)	Length
14.	"The Time of Our Lives" (with Il Divo)	Jörgen Elofsson	Steve Mac	4:39

=== Notes ===
- ^{^[a]} signifies a vocal producer
- ^{^[b]} signifies a co-producer
- ^{^[c]} signifies an additional producer

=== Sample credits ===
- "What's Good" contains a sample of "In All My Wildest Dreams" by Joe Sample.

== Personnel ==
Credits adapted from the liner notes of Libra.

=== Musicians ===
- Toni Braxton – vocals (all tracks); background vocals (tracks 1–3, 5–9)
- Tamar Braxton – background vocals (tracks 1–3, 5–9)
- Makeba Riddick – background vocals (track 1)
- Kim Johnson – background vocals (tracks 1, 9)
- Keri Lynn Hilson – background vocals (tracks 1, 7)
- Siete – guitar (track 2)
- Kendrick Dean – strings (track 2)
- Johntá Austin – background vocals (tracks 2, 3)
- Bryan-Michael Cox – all instruments (track 3)
- Rich Harrison – all instruments (track 4)
- Soulshock & Karlin – arrangement, all instruments (track 5)
- Eric Dawkins – background vocals (track 6)
- Tavia Ivy – background vocals (track 6)
- Latrelle Simmons – background vocals (track 6)
- Babyface – background vocals (track 6)
- Greg Phillinganes – piano (track 6)
- Cory Rooney – arrangement, programming, piano (track 8)
- Dan Shea – programming, piano, guitar (track 8)
- Keri Lewis – programming, additional keyboards (track 8)
- Nuno Bettencourt – guitar (track 10)

=== Technical ===
- Scott Storch – production (track 1)
- Keri Lewis – vocal production (tracks 1, 7, 9); co-production (tracks 2, 3); production (tracks 8, 10); mixing (track 8); executive production
- Kameron Houff – recording (track 1)
- Dave Russell – mixing (tracks 1, 4, 6, 7, 9); recording, editing (tracks 6, 9)
- Sara Lyn Killion – mixing assistance (tracks 1, 4, 6, 9)
- Chris Gehringer – mastering (track 1)
- Bryan-Michael Cox – production (tracks 2, 3)
- Kendrick "WyldCard" Dean – additional production (track 2)
- Sam Thomas – recording (track 2); mixing (tracks 2, 3)
- Mike Guidotti – recording assistance (track 2)
- Morgan Garcia – recording assistance (track 2); recording (track 3)
- Rick DeVarona – mixing assistance (track 2)
- Terrence Cash – recording assistance (track 3)
- Tony Terrebonne – mixing assistance (track 3)
- Rich Harrison – production (track 4)
- Paul Foley – recording (track 4); engineering (track 10)
- Soulshock & Karlin – production (track 5)
- Manny Marroquin – mixing (tracks 5, 10)
- Soulshock – mixing (track 5)
- The Underdogs – production (track 6)
- Babyface – production (track 6)
- Dabling "Hobby Boy" Harward – recording, editing (tracks 6, 9)
- Antonio Dixon – production (track 7, 9)
- Kelly – recording, editing (track 7)
- Thom "TK" Kidd – recording, editing (track 7)
- Rob Skipworth – recording assistance, editing assistance (track 7)
- Kevin Mahoney – recording assistance, editing assistance (track 7)
- Cory Rooney – production (track 8)
- Dan Shea – production (track 8)
- Eric Dawkins – vocal production (track 9)
- Toni Braxton – executive production
- Jomo Hankerson – executive production
- Vincent Herbert – executive production
- Barry Hankerson – executive production
- Gene Grimaldi – mastering

=== Artwork ===
- Heather Hankerson – creative direction
- Swade – art design
- Jonathan Mannion – photography
- Daniela Federici – photography
- John Ricard – photography
- Michael Muller – photography

== Charts ==
=== Weekly charts ===
Weekly chart performance for Libra
Chart (2005)	Peak position
German Albums (Offizielle Top 100)	60
Swiss Albums (Schweizer Hitparade)	25
US Billboard 200	4
US Top R&B/Hip-Hop Albums (Billboard)	2

=== Year-end charts ===
2005 year-end chart performance for Libra
Chart (2005)	Position
US Top R&B/Hip-Hop Albums (Billboard)	68

2006 year-end chart performance for Libra
Chart (2006)	Position
US Top R&B/Hip-Hop Albums (Billboard)	99

== Certifications ==
Certifications for Libra
Region	Certification	Certified units/sales
United States (RIAA)	Gold	500,000^{^}
^{^} Shipments figures based on certification alone.

== Release history ==
Release history for Libra
Region	Date	Edition	Label
United States	September 27, 2005	Standard	Blackground
Europe	October 21, 2005	Standard	Edel
Europe	June 23, 2006	Reissue	Edel
