= The Time of Our Lives (Il Divo and Toni Braxton song) =

Single by Il Divo with Toni Braxton

from the album Voices from the FIFA World Cup and Libra (European reissue)
- B-side: "Isabel"; "Heroe"
- Released: 9 June 2006
- Studio: Rokstone (London)
- Genre: Operatic pop
- Length: 4:39
- Label: Sony BMG; Syco
- Songwriter(s): Jörgen Elofsson
- Producer(s): Steve Mac

Il Divo singles chronology
"I Believe in You (Je crois en toi)" (2006)	"The Time of Our Lives" (2006)	"Wicked Game" (2011)

Toni Braxton singles chronology
"Suddenly" (2006)	"The Time of Our Lives" (2006)	"Yesterday" (2009)

Music video
- "The Time of Our Lives" on YouTube

"The Time of Our Lives" is a song recorded by multinational operatic pop quartet Il Divo and American singer Toni Braxton to serve as the official song of the 2006 FIFA World Cup held in Germany. Written by Jörgen Elofsson and produced by Steve Mac, the song appears on the compilation album Voices from the FIFA World Cup (2006) and on the 2006 European reissue of Braxton's sixth studio album, Libra.

Il Divo and Braxton performed "The Time of Our Lives" during the 2006 FIFA World Cup opening festivities at Allianz Arena in Munich on 9 June 2006. That same day it was released as a single in continental Europe, reaching the top 10 in Switzerland, the top 20 in Germany and Norway, and the top 30 in Italy and Austria, as well as number 52 on the European Hot 100 Singles chart.

== Music video ==
The single's music video, directed by Nigel Dick, takes place on a football field at night; the Il Divo members are standing on the turf while Braxton is seen on a screen. It is intercut with scenes from FIFA World Cup matches over the years.

== Track listings ==
- European CD single
1. "The Time of Our Lives" (radio edit) – 3:17
2. "Isabel" – 4:14
- European CD maxi single
1. "The Time of Our Lives" (radio edit) – 3:17
2. "Isabel" – 4:14
3. "The Time of Our Lives" (original version) – 4:39
4. "Heroe" – 4:17
5. "The Time of Our Lives" (video) - 5:07

== Personnel ==
=== Musicians ===
- Il Divo – vocals
- Toni Braxton – vocals
- Steve Mac – keyboards
- Dave Arch – piano
- Friðrik "Frissy" Karlsson – guitar
- Chris Laws – drums
- Isobel Griffiths – orchestra fixer
- Gavyn Wright – orchestra leader
- John Baker – copyist

=== Technical ===
- Steve Mac – producer, arranger
- Chris Laws – engineer, Pro Tools operator
- Dan Pursey – assistant engineer
- Ren Swan – mix engineer
- Dave Arch – string arrangements
- Geoff Foster – string engineer
- Jake Jackson – assistant
- Braddon Williams – engineer
- Keri Lewis – vocal producer for Toni Braxton
- Dave Russell – vocal engineer for Toni Braxton
- Dick Beetham – mastering

== Charts ==
Chart performance for "The Time of Our Lives"
Chart (2006)	Peak position
Austria (Ö3 Austria Top 40)	24
Belgium (Ultratip Bubbling Under Wallonia)	9
Europe (European Hot 100 Singles)	52
Germany (GfK)	17
Italy (FIMI)	24
Norway (VG-lista)	16
Switzerland (Schweizer Hitparade)	8
