= Suddenly (Toni Braxton song) =

Single by Toni Braxton

from the album Libra
- Released: February 2006
- Studio: Renegade, Chicago; Capitol, Hollywood; Ocean Way, Nashville; Tree Sound, Atlanta
- Length: 4:43
- Label: Edel
- Songwriter(s): Richard Marx
- Producer(s): Richard Marx

Toni Braxton singles chronology
"Take This Ring" (2005)	"Suddenly" (2006)	"The Time of Our Lives" (2006)

"Suddenly" is a song by American R&B singer–songwriter Toni Braxton, released internationally in February 2006 as the lead single from the European edition of her sixth studio album, Libra (2005). Written and produced by Richard Marx, it failed to make the charts anywhere. The track features Chris Botti on the trumpet, and was originally planned to appear on his 2005 album To Love Again: The Duets. Marx recorded this song as a duet with Braxton for his 2008 studio release Sundown and would later release it as a solo track on Now And Forever: The Ballads (2014) and yet as a different version on Beautiful Goodbye (2014).

== Track listing ==
All tracks written and produced by Richard Marx.

CD single
No.	Title	Length
1.	"Suddenly" (Radio Edit)	3:37
2.	"Suddenly" (Album Version)	4:43

== Personnel ==
Credits adapted from liner notes of Libra.

Performers and musicians

- Toni Braxton – vocals
- Richard Marx – bass, keyboards, piano, backing vocals
- Heitor Pereira – acoustic guitar
- Bruce Gaitsch – guitar solo
- Chris Botti – trumpet

Technical

- Richard Marx – producer, arranger, drum programming
- David Cole – engineer
- Mat Prock – engineer
- Chip Matthews – engineer, mixing
- Al Schmidt – engineer
- Brian Gill – assistant engineer

== Charts ==
Chart performance for "Suddenly"
Chart (2006)	Peak position
CIS Airplay (TopHit)	109
