= I Believe in You (Je crois en toi) =

Single by Celine Dion and Il Divo

from the album On ne change pas and Ancora
- Language: English; French
- B-side: "Hasta Mi Final"
- Released: 1 May 2006
- Studio: A Side Productions; Piccolo; Sveriges Radio 2
- Genre: Pop
- Length: 4:00
- Label: Columbia
- Songwriters: Jörgen Elofsson; Per Magnusson; David Kreuger; Matteo Saggese; Luc Plamondon
- Producers: Per Magnusson; David Kreuger

Celine Dion singles chronology
"Tout près du bonheur" (2006)	"I Believe in You (Je crois en toi)" (2006)	"Et s'il n'en restait qu'une (je serais celle-là)" (2007)

Il Divo singles chronology
"Mama" (2005)	"I Believe in You (Je crois en toi)" (2006)	"The Time of Our Lives" (2006)

Audio
- "I Believe in You (Je crois en toi)" on YouTube

"I Believe in You (Je crois en toi)" is a duet by Celine Dion and Il Divo, released as the third and final single from Dion's On ne change pas (2005) and as the lead single from Il Divo's Ancora (2005). On 23 January 2006, "I Believe in You" was issued to US radio, followed by a commercial single in May 2006 in France and Switzerland.

== Background and release ==
During her career, Dion recorded with opera singers Luciano Pavarotti on "I Hate You Then I Love You" in 1997 and Andrea Bocelli on "The Prayer" in 1998. In 2005, she collaborated with the classical crossover group Il Divo on "I Believe in You". The song was written by Jörgen Elofsson, Per Magnusson, David Kreuger, and Matteo Saggese, with English lyrics. Luc Plamondon, who had worked with Dion on her 1991 album Dion chante Plamondon, wrote the French text. The English-French duet, titled "I Believe in You (Je crois en toi)", appeared on Dion's On ne change pas in September 2005 and on Il Divo's Ancora in November 2005.

On Dion's album, the line "Someday I'll find you" is sung by Swiss tenor Urs Buhler, while on Il Divo's album it is performed by Spanish baritone Carlos Marín. This difference results from a swap of vocal lines, including part of the harmony in Dion's second verse. An English-only version was completed but never released; however, Il Divo performed it in concert, with tenor David Miller singing Dion's parts.

"I Believe in You (Je crois en toi)" was issued to US radio on 23 January 2006. The commercial single followed on 1 May 2006 in France and on 12 May 2006 in Switzerland. It was also sent to Canadian radio in May 2006.

On 20 May 2006, the duet was included on the official 2006 FIFA World Cup album, Voices from the FIFA World Cup.

== Critical reception ==
Reviewing Ancora, James Christopher Monger of AllMusic wrote: "They fawn over Celine Dion—who can barely contain her own affections..." Rob Theakston, assessing Dion's On ne change pas for AllMusic, noted that the addition of new material, including the duet, was a "plus side" of the compilation.

== Commercial performance ==
The single reached number 30 in France and number 35 in Switzerland. In the US, it peaked at number 31 on the Hot Adult Contemporary Tracks. Nearly three years after its release, the song climbed to number eight on Billboard's Portuguese Singles Chart.

== Live performances ==
Dion and Il Divo promoted "I Believe in You" on French television, performing it on Les 500 Choristes Ensemble in November 2005 and on Vivement Dimanche and Symphonic Show in December 2005.

== Formats and track listing ==
- French CD single
1. "I Believe in You (Je crois en toi)" – 4:00
2. "Hasta Mi Final" – 3:36
- US CD single
1. "I Believe in You (Je crois en toi)" – 4:00

== Charts ==
Chart performance
Chart (2006–2008)	Peak position
European Hot 100 Singles (Billboard)	90
France (SNEP)	30
Portugal Digital Songs (Billboard)	8
Quebec Radio Songs (ADISQ)	29
Switzerland (Schweizer Hitparade)	35
US Adult Contemporary (Billboard)	31

== Release history ==
Release history
Region	Date	Format	Label	Ref.
France	1 May 2006	CD	Columbia	
Switzerland	12 May 2006	CD	Columbia	
