= Celebrate the Day =

Single by Herbert Grönemeyer featuring Amadou et Mariam

from the album Voices from the FIFA World Cup
- Released: 1 June 2006
- Recorded: 2006
- Genre: Pop
- Length: 4:50
- Label: Sony BMG
- Songwriters: Amadou Bagayoko; Mariam Doumbia; Herbert Grönemeyer; Alex Silva
- Producers: Herbert Grönemeyer; Alex Silva

Herbert Gronemeyer singles chronology
"Zum Meer" (2003)	"Celebrate the Day" (2006)	"Stück vom Himmel" (2007)

Amadou singles chronology
"Celebrate the Day" (2006)

Mariam singles chronology
"Celebrate the Day" (2006)

"Celebrate the Day" is a single by Herbert Grönemeyer featuring duo Amadou et Mariam that was served as the official anthem of the 2006 FIFA World Cup held in Germany. Next to English version, Grönemeyer also recorded a German-language version called "Zeit, dass sich was dreht" (in Germany, Switzerland, Liechtenstein, Austria and Italy (Trentino-Alto Adige/Südtirol); English translation: Time that something turns) with a slightly different text and meaning. The song appears on the CD Zeit, dass sich was dreht.

== Charts ==
2006 weekly chart performance for "Celebrate the Day"
Chart (2006)	Peak position
Austria (Ö3 Austria Top 40)	2
Germany (GfK)	1
