= Circus Maximus Showroom =

- Location: Caesars Atlantic City; Atlantic City, New Jersey

Construction
- Opened: 1985; 41 years ago

Circus Maximus Showroom is a theater located in Atlantic City, New Jersey. It is the main entertainment venue for Caesars Atlantic City.

== Facility ==
The theater opened in 1985. Joan Rivers was the first performer.

From 1990–2015 (part of her last tour and to congratulate for 30 year building), Aretha Franklin headlines 12 shows.

In 2007, the theater was recreated.
