= Trippin' (That's the Way Love Works) =

Single by Toni Braxton

from the album Libra
- Released: September 26, 2005
- Studio: Doppler Studios (Atlanta, Georgia); Upstairs Studio (Atlanta, Georgia)
- Genre: R&B
- Length: 4:05
- Label: Blackground
- Songwriters: Bryan-Michael Cox; Kendrick Dean; Johntá Austin; Toni Braxton
- Producer: Bryan-Michael Cox

Toni Braxton singles chronology
"Please" (2005)	"Trippin' (That's the Way Love Works)" (2005)	"Take This Ring" (2005)

"Trippin' (That's the Way Love Works)" is a song by American singer Toni Braxton. It was written by Braxton, Johntá Austin, Bryan-Michael Cox and Kendrick "WyldCard" Dean for Braxton's sixth studio album, Libra (2005), while production was overseen by Cox, with co-production from Keri Lewis and additional production by Dean. Selected as the album's second single, the piano-heavy R&B ballad was released to US radios on September 26, 2005 by Blackground Records, followed by a European release in fall 2005. Commercially, it missed the US Billboard Hot 100 and charted outside the top sixty of the Hot R&B/Hip-Hop Songs. No music video was made for the song.

== Critical reception ==
Billboard's Chuck Taylor found that "Trippin' (That's the Way Love Works)" seems "like a track designed for Ciara, Ashanti or some other minor talent. It is not displeasing, but Braxton comes across as more of a response singer to the chorus of background singers [...] This one just doesn't measure up."

== Track listing ==
CD single
No.	Title	Writer(s)	Producer(s)	Length
1.	"Trippin' (That's the Way Love Works)" (Radio Edit)	Bryan-Michael Cox; Kendrick Dean; Johntá Austin; Toni Braxton	Cox; Keri Lewis^{[a]}; WyldCard^{[b]}	4:08
2.	"Trippin' (That's the Way Love Works)" (Instrumental)	Cox; Dean; Austin; Braxton	Cox; Lewis^{[a]}; WyldCard^{[b]}	4:06
3.	"Trippin' (That's the Way Love Works)" (Album Version)	Cox; Dean; Austin; Braxton	Cox; Lewis^{[a]}; WyldCard^{[b]}	4:05
4.	"I Hate You"	Harvey Mason Jr.; Damon Thomas; Antonio Dixon; Eric Dawkins; Kenneth Edmonds	The Underdogs	4:02

CD maxi single
No.	Title	Writer(s)	Producer(s)	Length
1.	"Trippin' (That's the Way Love Works)" (Radio Edit)	Cox; Dean; Austin; Braxton	Cox; Lewis^{[a]}; WyldCard^{[b]}	4:08
2.	"I Hate You"	Mason; Thomas; Dixon; Dawkins; Edmonds	The Underdogs	4:02

Notes

- ^{^[a]} signifies a co-producer
- ^{^[b]} signifies an additional producer

== Personnel ==
Credits adapted from liner notes of Libra.

- Toni Braxton – vocals, backing vocals
- Siete – guitar
- Tamar Braxton – backing vocals
- Johnta Austin – backing vocals
- Bryan-Michael Cox – producer
- Keri Lewis – co-producer
- Kendrick "WyldCard" Dean – additional producer, strings
- Sam Thomas – engineer, mixing

== Charts ==
Chart performance for "Trippin' (That's the Way Love Works)"
Chart (2005)	Peak position
US Adult R&B Songs (Billboard)	19
US Hot R&B/Hip-Hop Songs (Billboard)	67

== Release history ==
Release history for "Trippin' (That's the Way Love Works)"
Region	Date	Format	Label	Ref
United States	September 26, 2005	Airplay	Blackground	
Germany	November 18, 2005	Digital EP	Edel	
Germany	December 9, 2005	CD single	Edel	
