= Barry Hankerson =

American record executive and manager

- Born: August 3, 1947 (age 79); New York City, U.S.
- Occupations: Talent manager; record executive; record producer
- Years active: 1985–present
- Label: Blackground
- Spouses: Gladys Knight (m. 1974; div. 1979); Kathy Hankerson (m. 2007)

Barry Hankerson (born August 3, 1947) is an American record producer, record executive, and talent manager. He is the founder of Blackground Records, and the uncle of late singer and actress Aaliyah.

== Career ==
Born and raised in Harlem, New York City, Hankerson attended Central State University in Ohio, where he majored in sociology and played on the football team. After trying out unsuccessfully for the New York Jets, he moved to Detroit, Michigan, where he worked as a community organizer in the office of mayor Coleman Young in the early 1970s. Later in the decade, Hankerson moved into the entertainment industry, helping to produce the 1976 film Pipe Dreams, which he also costarred in with his then-wife Gladys Knight. He produced Ron Milner's play Don't Get God Started in 1988.

Hankerson formed Blackground in 1993, as a result of unsuccessful efforts to sign his niece, Aaliyah, to big record labels. Using his connection with singer R. Kelly, whom he managed at the time, Hankerson obtained a contract with Jive to distribute the release of Aaliyah's debut album Age Ain't Nothing but a Number. Initially named Blackground Enterprises, the label switched its name to Blackground Entertainment and later Blackground Records in 2000. It cooperated with a publishing company founded by Hankerson, named Black Fountain Music. Hankerson served as Aaliyah's manager until 1995, when her father, Michael Haughton, took over as manager. Aaliyah remained on his label until her death on August 25, 2001. Additionally, Hankerson managed and produced The Winans, and was a percussionist on their albums Let My People Go and Decisions. He also managed Toni Braxton.

Hankerson has been a strong supporter of Barack Obama, contributing heavily to both campaigns and producing a movie on him in 2012 titled The Obama Effect for the newly launched Blackground Pictures. It was directed by Charles S. Dutton and stars him, Katt Williams and Meagan Good.

== Personal life ==
Hankerson married Gladys Knight in October 1974; after four years, the couple divorced. He has one daughter and two sons; one with Knight, Shanga-Ali Hankerson and Jomo Hankerson, his oldest son, from a previous marriage. Hankerson married his current wife, Kathy, in June 2007, and they have four children together: three sons, Jibreel Ali, River Ali, and Che Ali Hankerson, and one daughter, Suhana Noor Hankerson. Hankerson is the brother of Diane Haughton and uncle to her and Michael Haughton's two children, American R&B singer Aaliyah and Rashad Haughton.

== Controversies ==
=== Toni Braxton ===
In 2007, Braxton filed a $10 million lawsuit against her former manager, Hankerson, alleging "fraud, deception and double dealing," in addition to mismanaging her relationship with Arista Records. According to Braxton's lawsuit, Hankerson placed his personal financial interests ahead of hers by using 'double-talk' to compromise the relationship between Braxton and her former label, with Hankerson allegedly telling Arista that "Braxton no longer wanted to record for Arista," and telling Braxton that "Arista was not interested in working with her anymore". The suit was settled with Braxton being forced to return a $375,000 advance to Hankerson, who would also receive a percentage of the sales of her next album, and Hankerson releasing Braxton from her contract with him. The settlement also temporarily limited the companies with which Braxton could sign. Hankerson claimed that the problems initially arose due to a number of disputes with Braxton and her wish to include her husband in her music.

=== Kyme Dang ===
In 2007, Kyme Dang sued the defunct Blackground Records for a $5.8 million settlement, alleging breach of written guaranty. According to Dang's lawsuit, Hankerson went so far as to buy and rename the salon she worked at as a hair stylist, took to the internet to accuse her of having AIDS, and then blew up her car in front of the Oceanside home she shared with her family. Dang claimed that Hankerson's private investigator was outside watching when the car exploded and "had the incident reported to the local police in such a manner as to deflect attention away from Hankerson as having involvement in the incident." On January 1, 2012, Blackground Records agreed to act as guarantor for the settlement agreement, but failed to pay Hankerson's debt after he defaulted on the agreement.

=== JoJo ===
On July 30, 2013, it was reported that JoJo had filed a lawsuit against Blackground Records for "irreparable damages to her professional career". Minors cannot sign contracts that last more than seven years under New York State law and thus she claims that as her contract was signed in 2004, her deal should have expired in 2011. In December 2013, both of JoJo's and Blackground's attorneys agreed to drop the case as both parties came to an agreement outside court. JoJo had claimed her manager and label wouldn't release her from contract, but were also refusing to allow her to release any music.

=== Aaliyah ===
In August 2021, it was reported that Blackground had rebranded as Blackground Records 2.0 and that former artists' discographies would be re-released on physical, digital, and streaming services in a deal between the record label and Empire Distribution. However, Aaliyah's estate, run by her mother and brother Rashad, issued a statement preempting Blackground 2.0's announcement, denouncing an "unscrupulous endeavor to release Aaliyah's music without any transparency or full accounting to the estate". Aaliyah's One In A Million was reissued on August 20, 2021. Her self titled album was released a few weeks later. Albums from Tank, Timbaland & Magoo, JoJo, Toni Braxton and Ashley Parker Angel and soundtracks to Romeo Must Die and Exit Wounds were also re-released.

In August 2026, Hankerson's son, Jomo, sued his father, for breaching a settlement over music rights. Specifically, he cites Aaliyah’s recording masters and music publishing copyrights. Not just her, though, but also for artists such as DMX, Toni Braxton, and Timbaland. Jomo claims that, per an alleged settlement deal, he’s owed 12% of the money Barry made from the aforementioned music assets. However, he says that his dad used Blackground Records to hide the money. Jomo also alleges Barry used the label to “manufacture expenses that have nothing to do with the music assets, all for the purpose of pressuring [Jomo] into accepting less than what he is owed.” Jomo is seeking over $1.2 million in damages. In response, Barry has said that the settlement in question was executed under fraud. Therefore, Jomo would not be entitled to any of it. He’s also alleged that his son has previously threatened vindictive action over the settlement money claims. Barry said that Jomo warned he would release unreleased Aaliyah music if his demands for financial compensation were not met. The documents also show that Barry blamed Jomo for Aaliyah's death, stating that Jomo "failed in his responsibility” to make adequate travel plans, which resulted in a plane crash that “may have been avoided had [Jomo] followed through on his compensated task of travel coordination.”
