= Take This Ring =

Single by Toni Braxton

from the album Libra
- Released: December 2005
- Studio: Encore (Burbank, California)
- Genre: Funk; R&B; hip hop
- Length: 4:35
- Label: Blackground
- Songwriter(s): Rich Harrison
- Producer(s): Rich Harrison

Toni Braxton singles chronology
"Trippin' (That's the Way Love Works)" (2005)	"Take This Ring" (2005)	"Suddenly" (2006)

"Take This Ring" is a song by American singer Toni Braxton. It was written and produced by Rich Harrison for Braxton's sixth studio album, Libra (2005). A subdued go go track, it features an uncredited sample from the song "Here Comes the Meter Man" (1969) by The Meters. Lyrically, it has Braxton singing about her plans to be free from a night of matrimonial responsibilities. "Take This Ring was released as the album's third and final stateside single but failed to enter the Hot R&B/Hip-Hop Songs chart, though it peaked at number 12 on the Bubbling Under R&B/Hip-Hop Songs. No music video was made for the song.

== Critical reception ==
Critics compared "Take This Ring" to singer Amerie's "1 Thing" (2005). Miami New Times critic Rich Juzwiak found that "Harrison gives Toni Braxton exactly what she needs to get her groove back on "Take This Ring," which counts as her best track since 2000's "He Wasn't Man Enough." Against subdued go-go that would befuddle Amerie, Brax takes off her wedding ring and approaches her inner hoochie with finesse." Doug Rule from Metro Weekly called the song "a party band jam, featuring festive live percussion. But it earns distinction as the album’s wildest track even more because of its lyrics."

== Chart performance ==
Similarly to Braxton's two previous singles from Libra, "Take This Ring" was shadowed by lack of promotion from her record company, Blackground Records, causing the single to miss the US Billboard Hot 100. It debuted at number 23 on the Bubbling Under R&B/Hip-Hop Singles chart in November 2005 based on radio airplay only, peaking at number 12 three months later.

== Personnel ==
Credits adapted from liner notes of Libra.

- Tamar Braxton – background vocals
- Toni Braxton – vocals
- Paul Foley – engineer
- Rich Harrison – instrumentation, producer, writer
- Dave "Natural Love" Russell – mixing

== Charts ==
Chart performance for "Take This Ring"
Chart (2006)	Peak position
US Bubbling Under R&B/Hip-Hop Songs (Billboard)	12
