= Toni Braxton =

American singer (born 1967)

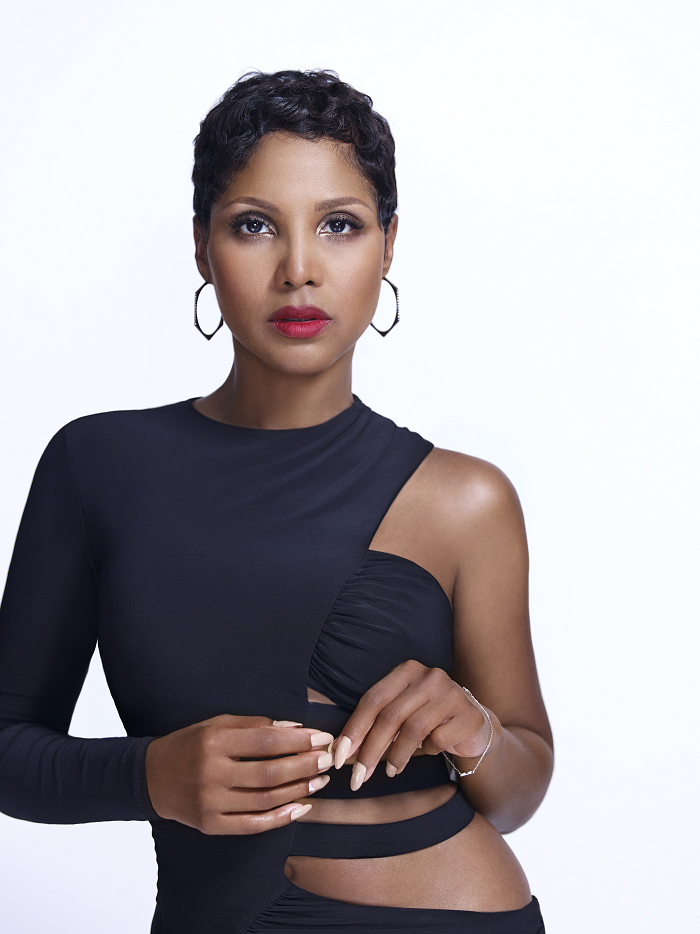
- Braxton in 2015
- Born: Toni Michele Braxton; October 7, 1967 (age 58); Severn, Maryland, U.S.
- Occupations: Singer; songwriter; actress; television personality
- Years active: 1989–present
- Spouse(s): Keri Lewis (m. 2001; div. 2013) Birdman (m. 2024)
- Children: 2
- Relatives: Traci Braxton (sister); Towanda Braxton (sister); Trina Braxton (sister); Tamar Braxton (sister)
- Awards: Full list
- Musical career
- Genres: R&B; pop
- Instrument: Vocals
- Labels: LaFace; Arista; Blackground; Atlantic; Inot; Motown; Def Jam; Island
- Member of: The Braxtons

Toni Michele Braxton (born October 7, 1967) is an American singer, songwriter, actress and television personality. Braxton has won seven Grammy Awards, nine Billboard Music Awards, seven American Music Awards, and numerous other accolades. In 2011, Braxton was inducted into the Georgia Music Hall of Fame. In 2017, she was honored with the Legend Award at the Soul Train Music Awards.

In the late 1980s, Braxton began performing with her sisters in the R&B group the Braxtons; the group was signed to Arista Records. After attracting the attention of producers Antonio "L.A." Reid and Kenneth "Babyface" Edmonds, she signed with their label LaFace Records as a solo artist to release her self-titled debut studio album (1993). The album reached number one on the Billboard 200 chart, sold 10 million copies worldwide, and spawned the international hit singles "Another Sad Love Song" and "Breathe Again". Also a critical success, the album yielded Braxton three Grammy Awards, including for Best New Artist. Her success continued with the album Secrets (1996), which included the Billboard Hot 100-number one singles "You're Makin' Me High/Let It Flow" and "Un-Break My Heart".

Braxton's third studio album, The Heat (2000), debuted at number two on the Billboard 200, spawning the international top-five single "He Wasn't Man Enough". Braxton's subsequent studio albums, Snowflakes (2001), More Than a Woman (2002), Libra (2005) and Pulse (2010), were released amid contractual disputes and health issues. In 2014, Braxton and former label boss Babyface released the duet album Love, Marriage & Divorce (2014), which won Best R&B Album at the 57th Annual Grammy Awards. Further label changes saw the release of Sex & Cigarettes (2018) under Def Jam Recordings and Spell My Name (2020) under Island.

Braxton is also active in television production and presentation. She competed in the seventh season of the reality competition series Dancing with the Stars. She executive produced and starred in Braxton Family Values, a reality television series that aired on We TV from 2011 to 2020. Braxton was also an executive producer of Tamar & Vince, a spinoff reality series starring her younger sister, Tamar.

== Early life ==
Toni Michele Braxton was born in Severn, Maryland, on October 7, 1967. Her father, Michael Conrad Braxton Sr., was a Methodist clergyman and power company worker, and her mother, Evelyn Jackson, a native of South Carolina, was a former opera singer and cosmetologist, as well as a pastor. Braxton's maternal grandfather was also a pastor. Braxton later said that her religious upbringing had given her an advantage musically, saying it gave her "a finer-tuned ear. [...] The church pulpit is the stage. You got the congregation, that's your audience. And so we were comfortable performing".

Braxton is the eldest of six siblings. She has a younger brother Michael Jr. (born 1968) and four younger sisters Traci Renee (1971 - 2022), Towanda Chloe (born 1973), Trina Evette (born 1974), and Tamar Estine (born 1977). They were raised in a strict religious household, and Braxton's first performing experience was singing in her church choir.

Braxton attended Bowie State University to obtain a teaching degree, but decided to sing professionally after she was discovered by William E. Pettaway Jr., who reportedly heard her singing to herself while pumping gas.

On her appearance May 24, 2014, broadcast of NPR's Wait Wait... Don't Tell Me!, she stated that she was not singing to herself at the gas station. Pettaway, working as an attendant at the Annapolis service station where she was refueling, recognized her from local performances and introduced himself, saying he wanted to produce her. Although skeptical, Braxton decided to, in her words, "take a chance" and accepted.

== Career ==
=== 1989–1995: The Braxtons, Toni Braxton and breakthrough ===
Braxton and her four sisters Traci, Towanda, Trina, and Tamar began performing as The Braxtons in the late 1980s and were signed to Arista Records in 1989. Their first single, "Good Life", was released in 1990. Though the song was not successful, it attracted the attention of record executive Antonio "L.A." Reid and record producer Kenneth "Babyface" Edmonds. Reid and Babyface recruited her to record a demo of "Love Shoulda Brought You Home", a song that they had written for Anita Baker for the soundtrack of Eddie Murphy's film, Boomerang. Baker, who was pregnant at the time, did not record the song but suggested that Braxton record it. Her recording was later included on the soundtrack along with "Give U My Heart", a duet by Braxton and Babyface. Braxton, meanwhile, was signed to Reid and Edmonds' Arista-distributed imprint, LaFace Records, and immediately began recording her solo debut album.

In July 1993, LaFace released Braxton's self-titled debut album. Primarily produced by Reid, Babyface, and Daryl Simmons, it peaked at number one on the US Billboard 200 and entered the top ten of the albums chart in Australia, Canada, Germany, New Zealand, and the United Kingdom. The first single, "Another Sad Love Song", peaked at number seven and number two on the Billboard Hot 100 and R&B Singles charts respectively. The album's second single, "Breathe Again", peaked in the top five of both the Hot 100 and R&B singles charts and no 2 in the UK. More singles from Toni Braxton were released in 1994, including "You Mean the World to Me", "Seven Whole Days", and "I Belong to You/How Many Ways".

Braxton's debut album won her several awards, including three Grammy Awards (for Best New Artist and two consecutive awards for Best Female R&B Vocal Performance in 1994 and 1995). She won two American Music Awards (for Favorite Soul/R&B New Artist and Favorite New Adult Contemporary Artist) in 1994 and another one in 1995 (for Favorite Soul/R&B Album). Toni Braxton was certified 8× platinum in USA and has sales of over 10 million worldwide.

=== 1996–1999: Secrets and financial issues ===
In June 1996, Braxton released her second album Secrets. Motivated "to include a little bit of everything", Braxton reteamed with Babyface, but also worked with R. Kelly, Tony Rich, and David Foster on the album, which she co-produced. A major success, it peaked at number two on the Billboard 200 and reached the top ten on most international charts. After 92 weeks in the charts, Secrets was certified 8× platinum, becoming Braxton's second straight 8 million-seller. Internationally, Secrets sold more than 15 million copies, further cementing Braxton's superstar status. The album's lead single, "You're Makin' Me High", became Braxton's first number-one hit on the US Billboard Hot 100. Its follow-up, the Diane Warren-penned ballad "Un-Break My Heart", achieved even greater global success, ultimately becoming the biggest hit of her career.

As a result, Braxton topped several of Billboard's year-end charts, and won two Grammy Awards; one for Best Female Pop Vocal Performance for "Un-Break My Heart" and Best Female R&B Vocal Performance for "You're Makin' Me High" as well as two American Music Awards for Favorite Female Soul/R&B Artist and Favorite Soul/R&B Album. Still waiting on her financial rewards, Braxton eventually launched an unsuccessful lawsuit against Arista and LaFace Records. Soon after, she filed for chapter 7 bankruptcy. Public reaction to these events was very harsh, having been expressed most clearly in an interview on The Oprah Winfrey Show.

Braxton has appeared in two Disney Broadway shows: She made her Broadway debut as Belle in Beauty and the Beast beginning September 9, 1998, when she replaced Kim Huber. During her run in the show Alan Menken wrote and composed a new song for the musical, titled "A Change in Me", which he specially wrote and composed for Braxton, and was still being used in the musical as of late July 2014. She left the production on February 28, 1999, and was succeeded by Andrea McArdle. Her role in Beauty and the Beast marked the first (and only) time a black woman commanded the leading role of Belle on Broadway. (In the UK, Michelle Gayle played the role in the West End.) It also marked the first time a black woman would star in a Disney musical on Broadway. In 1999, the lawsuit against LaFace Records was settled and Braxton was given back all her possessions, giving her time to record The Heat, her first album in four years.

=== 2000–2002: The Heat, More Than a Woman, and acting debut ===
After her three-year-long dispute with LaFace and Arista had been settled, Braxton signed a new $20 million contract. In April 2000, her third studio album, The Heat was released. Braxton took a more hands-on approach, co-writing and co-producing a handful of the tracks which saw her adapting a more urban sound. It opened at number two on the US Billboard 200 with 199,000 copies sold in its first week, eventually going double platinum in the United States, while selling over 4 million copies worldwide. Additionally, the album was nominated for Best R&B Album at the 2001 Grammy Awards, while uptempo lead single "He Wasn't Man Enough", a worldwide top ten hit, won for Best Female R&B Vocal Performance and was nominated for Best R&B Song.

In 2001, Braxton made her movie acting debut in director Doug McHenry's comedy film Kingdom Come opposite an ensemble also starring LL Cool J, Jada Pinkett Smith, and Whoopi Goldberg. A modest box-office success, it grossed $23.4 million worldwide. The same year, Braxton recorded and released the Christmas album Snowflakes which consisted R&B–led original songs co-penned with Keri Lewis and Babyface as well as several remixes and cover versions of Christmas standards and carols. It received a mixed reception by critics, many of whom compared its nature to Braxton's other work but found the stylized production and original material too contemporary to conjure images of Christmas, and failed to reach the upper half of the Billboard 200, eventually going gold in the United States.

In 2002, while gearing up for the release of her fourth studio album, Braxton discovered she was pregnant with her second child. Knowing that she would be unable to promote the album properly, she unsuccessfully lobbied Arista Records to get the label to postpone its release until after she was to give birth. In November 2002, More Than a Woman was released. Opening to an instant commercial disappointment, the album peaked at number 13 on the US Billboard 200, but was less successful internationally. The first single "Hit the Freeway" failed to impact, resulting in lackluster sales in general and the release of no further singles. More Than a Woman was eventually certified gold in the United States and sold more than 800,000 copies worldwide.

=== 2003–2007: Libra and Las Vegas residency ===
In April 2003, Braxton abruptly left Arista Records, having been there for 14 years, and immediately signed with Blackground Records, headed by Barry Hankerson, her manager at the time. She then starred in Aida as Aida beginning June 30, 2003, when she replaced actress Simone, until she left the cast on November 16, 2003. In April 2005, Braxton's new label, Blackground/Universal, released "Please", the first single from her fifth album, Libra. The album was originally planned for a June release, but it was pushed back several times and was finally issued on September 27. Libra peaked at number four on the US Billboard 200, selling 114,593 copies in the first week, and peaked at number two on the Top R&B/Hip-Hop Albums. The album was certified gold in late 2005 and has since sold 679,000 copies worldwide.

In May 2005, Braxton made an appearance on the season finale of American Idol 5, where she performed Elvis Presley's "In the Ghetto" with soon-to-be winner Taylor Hicks. A month later, "The Time of Our Lives", a duet with classical crossover vocal group Il Divo, was released as a single, serving as the official 2006 FIFA World Cup anthem. Braxton performed the song, which entered the top ten in Switzerland, at the opening ceremony in Berlin on June 9, 2005. In August 2006, Braxton replaced singer Wayne Newton as the Flamingo Las Vegas's new headlining act. The show, entitled Toni Braxton: Revealed, was to be performed six nights a week and was scheduled to run through to March 2007. Braxton later confirmed that she was extending her show through to August 2007. Due to its success, it was reported that Braxton would extend her show through to August 2008, though the show was later cancelled in order for Braxton to focus on her health after being diagnosed with microvascular angina.

On January 12, 2007, Braxton filed a $10 million lawsuit against her former manager Barry Hankerson, alleging "fraud, deception and double dealing", in addition to mismanaging her relationship with Arista Records. According to Braxton's lawsuit, Hankerson placed his personal financial interests ahead of hers by using 'double-talk' to compromise the relationship between Braxton and her former label, with Hankerson allegedly telling Arista that "Braxton no longer wanted to record for Arista", and telling Braxton that "Arista was not interested in working with her anymore". The suit was settled with Braxton being forced to return a $375,000 advance to Hankerson, who would also receive a percentage of the sales of her next album, and Hankerson releasing Braxton from her contract with him. The settlement also temporarily limited the companies with which Braxton could sign. Hankerson claimed that the problems initially arose due to a number of disputes with Braxton and her wish to include her husband in her music.

=== 2008–2012: Pulse and television ===
Following the abrupt cancellation of her Toni Braxton: Revealed show, Braxton experienced financial difficulties when insurance agency Lloyd's of London refused to honor her policy that she purchased for upwards of $70,000 that included financial compensations for financial losses. Lloyd's responded with a counter-suit seeking damages against her because of an unrelated heart condition that the company was not made aware of at the time the application was filed. When Braxton acknowledged that she did not disclose her full medical history at the time, she got on the hook for all damages because of the cancelled shows, being sued by multiple companies, and had to once again file for bankruptcy. In September 2008, Braxton appeared on the seventh season of American dance competition series Dancing with the Stars; her partner was Alec Mazo. They were voted off in the fifth week of the competition.

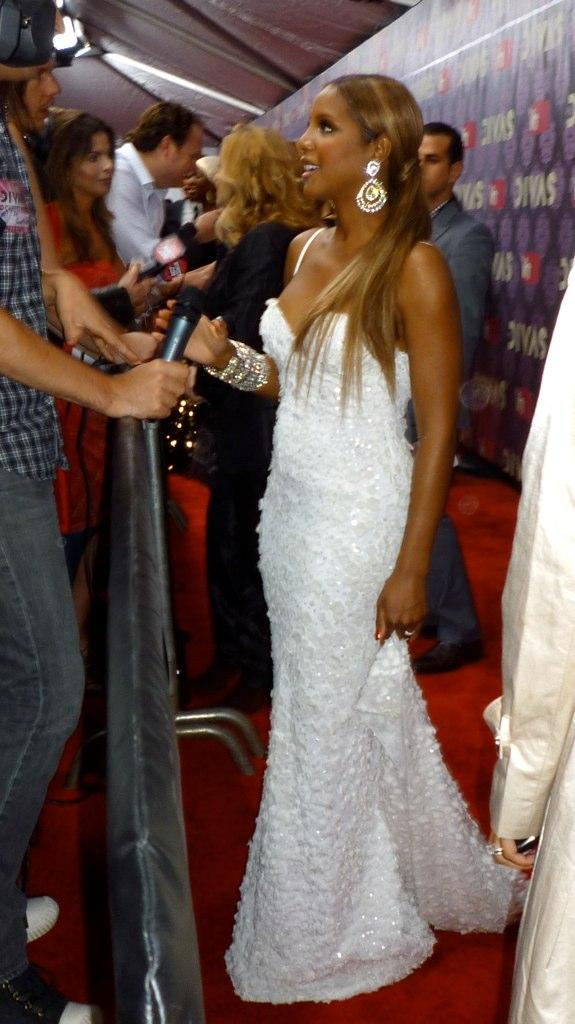
Braxton at the VH1 Divas 2009 red carpet

In 2009, Braxton signed to Atlantic Records and began work on her next studio album. In February 2010, she was part of the supergroup Artists for Haiti who recorded "We Are the World 25 for Haiti", a remake of the 1985 hit "We Are the World", to help benefit the people of Haiti following the magnitude 7.0 M_{w} earthquake. Three months later, Pulse, her seventh studio album, was released. A collection of up-tempo songs and R&B ballads with production varying from smooth to dance-based styles, it debuted at number nine on the US Billboard 200, selling 54,000 copies in its first week, and topped the R&B/Hip-Hop Albums, becoming Braxton's fifth US top-ten album. A moderate chart success elsewhere, it reached the top ten in Switzerland, and the top 20 in Germany and Greece. While critical reception of Pulse was generally positive, its singles "Yesterday", "Hands Tied" and "Make My Heart" achieved moderate chart success.

In 2011, Braxton signed with WE tv for a reality series, Braxton Family Values. Chronicling the lives of Braxton and her sisters Tamar, Traci, Towanda, and Trina, plus their mother Evelyn, the series debuted on April 12, 2011. It received favorable reviews from critics who recognized it as a "guilty pleasure" and spawned several seasons and spin-offs. In September 2011, Braxton parted ways with her long-time manager Vincent Herbert, husband of sister Tamar, and signed a new management deal with Los Angeles-based entertainment/production company The Collective. In March 2012, she released the standalone single "I Heart You", a dance-pop, EDM and house song that peaked at number one on the US Dance Club Songs. Also that year, Braxton played Rosalie Rosebud, a singer with an over-the-top personality, in the children's musical adventure comedy film The Oogieloves in the Big Balloon Adventure alongside Jaime Pressly and Cloris Leachman, and began filming a lead role in the Lifetime Movie Network film Twist of Faith which premiered the following year.

=== 2013–2014: Love, Marriage and Divorce, Broadway return, and biographical film ===
In 2013, Braxton and longtime creative music partner Babyface began work on their collaborative studio album Love, Marriage & Divorce which was released in February 2014 under Motown Records. It received favorable reviews from music critics, who labeled it as "high-quality R&B", and debuted at number 4 on the Billboard 200 and the top of the R&B/Hip-Hop Albums with first-week sales of 67,000 copies. Love, Marriage & Divorce was nominated for World's Best Album at the 2014 World Music Awards and won for Best R&B Album at the 57th Grammy Awards. Lead single "Hurt You" reached number one on the US Adult R&B Songs, becoming Braxton's first song to do so since her 2000 release "Just Be a Man About It". The song also hit number 16 on Billboard Hot R&B/ Hip Hop Airplay chart.

Braxton, alongside Babyface, made her return to Broadway in the musical After Midnight in March 2014. The third in rotation in the role of "Special Guest Star" following Fantasia Barrino and KD Lang, they performed from March 18 to 31, 2014 at the Brooks Atkinson Theatre. In May 2014, Braxton published a memoir, Unbreak My Heart: A Memoir, through Harper Collins Publishers. In it, Braxton discusses her career success and struggles and the self-healing she took charge of after her own diagnosis with the auto-immune disease lupus and her son's diagnosis with autism. In October 2015, Toni along with The Braxtons released the holiday album Braxton Family Christmas on Def Jam Recordings. Comprising cover versions of Christmas standards and carols as well as several original songs, it debuted and peaked at number 27 on the US Billboard R&B/Hip-Hop Albums.

Lifetime premiered the biographical film Toni Braxton: Unbreak My Heart, based on Braxton's memoir, in January 2016; actress Lex Scott Davis portrayed Braxton in the film. The biopic's premiere generated 3.6 million viewers. In July, Braxton announced that she would embark on a concert tour, titled The Hits Tour, that October. She was hospitalized on October 3, five days before the tour was scheduled to begin, due to complications with lupus, resulting in the cancellation of the tour's first two dates. Braxton was admitted to hospital again on October 15, leading to another tour date cancellation, which was later rescheduled. In December, she announced that the January 2017 concert dates had been canceled.

=== 2017–2019: Sex & Cigarettes, touring, and other ventures ===
In January 2018, Braxton starred in the Lifetime film Faith Under Fire. In March, her eighth studio album Sex & Cigarettes, her first solo album in eight years, was released on Def Jam Recordings. An adult contemporary R&B album with production from Fred Ball, Babyface, Dapo Torimiro, and Tricky Stewart, it debuted at number 22 on the US Billboard 200 and number one on the Top R&B/Hip-Hop Albums chart. Sex & Cigarettes received mainly positive reviews from music critics, and was nominated for Best R&B Album at the 61st Annual Grammy Awards. Second single "Long as I Live" topped the US Adult R&B Songs, becoming Braxton's eighth chart topper, while breaking a tie with singers Maxwell and R. Kelly to give her sole possession of the second-most number-ones in the chart's 24-year history. It also received Grammy Award nomination for Best R&B Performance and Best R&B Song.

Also in 2018, Braxton and Uncle Bud's Hemp products created a joint marketing campaign for the latter's products, which Braxton noted as helpful in her battle against lupus. In April 2018, Braxton and her sisters Trina and Towanda appeared on their sister Traci's single "Broken Things". In November, Braxton and Towanda appeared in the holiday film Every Day is Christmas, which premiered on Lifetime. The same month, she announced her As Long as I Live Tour, a joint concert tour with SWV, which took her to South Africa and the United Kingdom. In June 2019, Braxton headlined the 2019 Pittsburgh Pride festival.

=== 2020–present: New record label and Spell My Name ===
In April 2020, it was announced that Braxton had signed with Island Records. She released the single, "Do It", her first song under the new deal on April 6, 2020. In May, Braxton released a remix EP for her second single "Dance". On June 26, 2020, Missy Elliott appeared on the official remix to the single "Do It". Elliott co-produced the track alongside Hannon Lane. On August 4, 2020, Braxton released the music video for "Dance", directed by Mike Ho. On August 27, 2020, Braxton released the song "Nothin'". Braxton's tenth studio Spell My Name was released on August 28, 2020. On October 23, 2020, Braxton released a video for her song "Gotta Move On".

In 2021, Braxton competed on season six of The Masked Singer as "Pufferfish". She was the third to be eliminated during the two-night premiere alongside Dwight Howard as "Octopus" and Vivica A. Fox as "Mother Nature". Despite being unmasked, Braxton kept on a glittered KN95 cloth face mask over her mouth due to her lupus condition. Braxton is an executive producer and star in the 2022 Lifetime movie The Fallen Angels Murder Club.

== Artistry ==
Braxton has been recognized for her distinctive contralto voice. Her voice has been called "husky, sultry, elegant and sexy". Due to the huskiness of her voice, Braxton often used male singers such as Michael McDonald, Luther Vandross and Stevie Wonder as vocal style models. Chaka Khan and Anita Baker were two of the few female singers that she could stylize. Steve Huey of AllMusic cites a key to Braxton's success is the versatility of her voice, which he states as being "soulful enough for R&B audiences, but smooth enough for adult contemporary; sophisticated enough for adults, but sultry enough for younger listeners; strong enough in the face of heartbreak to appeal to women, but ravishing enough to nab the fellas." In 2023, Rolling Stone ranked Braxton at No. 48 on their list of the 200 Greatest Singers of All Time.

Braxton began her career singing traditional R&B and soft rock ballads and love songs on her debut and second albums. However, hip-hop soul and dance music elements begun to get spun into her sound on The Heat, More Than a Woman, and Pulse. She also showcased her classical training while performing in Broadway plays Beauty and the Beast and Aida as well as her duet with Il Divo, "The Time of Our Lives".

== Legacy ==
Toni Braxton became an R&B superstar after the release of her first album. LA Reid stated during an interview with VH1: "We called her the first lady of LaFace. She was our Diva. Clive had Whitney, Tommy had Mariah and we had Toni." BBC called the album "spiritedly, mature soul at its best – and just urban enough to make it the bedroom album for the hip hop generation." Her hit "Un-Break My Heart", the Diane Warren-penned ballad, spent 11-weeks at number 1. Bob McCann, author of Encyclopedia of African American Actresses in Film and Television (2010), considered it "simply one of the most haunting R&B records ever made." Reviewer Mark Edward Nero named it one of the best R&B break-up songs and considered it Braxton's "finest moment". He further commented, "damn, this song is so sad it can make people cry for hours at a time." She has been cited as an influence by various artists, such as Beyoncé, sister Tamar Braxton, Billie Godfrey, Kelly Clarkson, Leela James, Keyshia Cole, Teyana Taylor, Kehlani, Sevyn Streeter, Ari Lennox and Anja Nissen.

Braxton's career, she made several impacts on fashion, mostly for her high splits in her dresses. In 2011, Braxton topped the list for the Grammy Award's best dressed of the decade. "I've always gone a little risque with all my other award show outfits." In 2012, Braxton made the list for VH1's 50 Greatest Women in Music. Braxton's 2000 performance at Super Bowl XXXIV is ranked as one of the most memorable Super Bowl performances. Braxton is featured alongside other R&B and pop divas as a primary character on the popular web parody Got 2B Real: The Diva Variety Show. Braxton also made headlines for her Giantto Million Dollar Microphone that she performed every show with. Braxton said: "I think it's a great element to the show. You have to have a little sprinkle of Liberace and this is my little sprinkle of that." Braxton's prop was made up of white gold and encrusted with 650 karats of diamonds.

Braxton has also been seen as a gay icon, with some of her songs becoming gay anthems, such as "Un-Break My Heart", "He Wasn't Man Enough" and "Make My Heart". The singer stated that after the release of "Un-Break My Heart", she "recognized all the support. And it was really wonderful." When asked about her gay fans, Braxton said "I love my boys because my boys help me be a better girl. My choreographer and my video director are gay, and they've been my best friends since I started in the industry. They're my favorite part of the whole industry".

== Personal life ==
=== Relationships ===
Braxton met musician Keri Lewis when his group, Mint Condition, opened for her on tour; they married on April 21, 2001. In December 2001, she gave birth to their first child, a son. In 2002, while gearing up for the release of her fourth studio album, Braxton discovered she was pregnant with her second child; the complicated pregnancy confined her to bed rest. The couple's second son was born in 2003. As he has been diagnosed with autism, Braxton has become involved with Autism Speaks, serving as their International Spokesperson. In November 2009, Braxton announced that she and her husband had separated. The couple later divorced in July 2013.

In her early 30s, Braxton had an abortion after discovering she was pregnant by then-boyfriend Keri Lewis. In her memoir Unbreak My Heart, Braxton discusses her abortion and guilt, saying that her second son's autism was "God's payback". In an October 2006 concert at the Flamingo Las Vegas, Braxton broke down in tears while announcing to the audience that just before the concert began she had been told that her son had been diagnosed with autism. Braxton has been outspoken regarding her doctor's failure to diagnose his condition earlier, contending that if he had been diagnosed earlier he could have received treatment earlier. As well as becoming a spokeswoman for Autism Speaks, she is also a spokeswoman for the American Heart Association.

On July 8, 2015, Braxton's attorney, Antavius Weems, announced that Braxton had settled her contentious child support case with her former husband, Keri Lewis. On June 2, 2016, the city and county officials of Atlanta, Georgia, named June 2 as Toni Braxton Day.

Braxton began dating rapper Birdman in May 2016, and the couple announced their engagement in February 2018. In January 2019, the couple called off the engagement. In April 2019, both Braxton and Birdman confirmed that they were still together, however, they broke up later that year. In November 2023, Braxton posted that they were dating again. On August 8, 2024, the couple got married. Two weeks later, Braxton filed for divorce. She later dismissed the filing in January 2025.

=== Health problems ===
In August 2007, rumors surfaced that Braxton had been diagnosed with breast cancer. She stated to Access Hollywood that the breast cancer rumors were false and that her health was very good. However, in 2008, she had a benign lump removed from her breast. On April 8, 2008, near the end of her two-year run at the Flamingo Hotel, Braxton was briefly hospitalized and the remaining dates on the show, which was scheduled to end on August 23, 2008, were cancelled. Later, while appearing on Season 7 of Dancing with the Stars, she stated, that she has been diagnosed with microvascular angina (small vessel disease).

On November 18, 2010, Braxton revealed to CBS News that she had been diagnosed with systemic lupus erythematosus (SLE), a potentially life-threatening autoimmune disease.

Braxton's uncle died of complications from lupus. While taping her reality series Braxton Family Values, she went into hospital for surgery. Braxton was hospitalized in Los Angeles in December 2012 because of "minor health issues" related to lupus.

== Discography ==
Studio albums

- Toni Braxton (1993)
- Secrets (1996)
- The Heat (2000)
- Snowflakes (2001)
- More Than a Woman (2002)
- Libra (2005)
- Pulse (2010)
- Sex & Cigarettes (2018)
- Spell My Name (2020)

Collaborative albums

- Love, Marriage & Divorce (with Babyface) (2014)

== Tours and residencies ==
Headlining

- Secrets Tour (1996–1997)
- Libra Tour (2006)
- 2013 Summer Tour (2013)
- The Hits Tour (2016)
- As Long as I Live Tour (2019)

Co-headlining

- Toni Braxton & Babyface Live (2015)
- The New Edition Way Tour (with New Edition and Boyz II Men) (2026)

Residencies

- Toni Braxton: Revealed (2006–08)
- Love & Laughter (with Cedric the Entertainer) (2024–2025)

== Filmography ==
=== Film ===
Year	Title	Role	Notes
2001	Kingdom Come	Juanita Slocumb	
2002	Play'd: A Hip Hop Story	Shonda	Television film
2012	The Oogieloves in the Big Balloon Adventure	Rosalie Rosebud	
2013	Twist of Faith	Nina Jones	Television film
2016	Toni Braxton: Unbreak My Heart	Herself	Television film
2018	Faith Under Fire: The Antoinette Tuff Story	Antoinette Tuff	Television film
2018	Every Day Is Christmas	Alexis Taylor	Television film
2022	Fallen Angels Murder Club	Hollis Morgan	Television film
2025	He Wasn't Man Enough	Mel Montgomery	Television film
2026	Breathe Again	Jennifer	Television film

=== Television ===
Year	Title	Role	Notes
1994	Roc	Herself	Episode: "The Concert"
2000	Mad TV	Herself	Episode: "6.10"
2004	Blue's Clues	Herself	Episode: "Bluestock"
2005	Kevin Hill	Terry Knox	3 episodes
2008	Dancing with the Stars	Herself	Season 7 contestant
2011–2020, 2024	Braxton Family Values	Herself	Main role; 142 episodes
2021	The Masked Singer	Herself/Pufferfish	Season 6 contestant
2024	The Neighborhood	Herself	Episode: "Welcome to the World"

=== Music videos ===
Title	Year	Artist	Notes
"Miss You"	2002	Aaliyah	
"Last Call"	2014	Traci Braxton	

== See also ==
- Honorific nicknames in popular music
- List of artists who reached number one in the United States
- List of artists who reached number one on the U.S. dance chart
- List of best-selling music artists
