= Seven Whole Days =

Single by Toni Braxton

from the album Toni Braxton
- B-side: "The Christmas Song"
- Released: October 8, 1993
- Studio: LaCoCo (Atlanta, Georgia)
- Length: 6:22
- Label: LaFace
- Songwriters: Antonio "L.A." Reid; Babyface
- Producers: L.A. Reid; Babyface; Daryl Simmons

Toni Braxton singles chronology
"Breathe Again" (1993)	"Seven Whole Days" (1993)	"You Mean the World to Me" (1994)

Music video
- "Seven Whole Days" on YouTube

"Seven Whole Days" is a song performed by American singer Toni Braxton. It serves as the third single from her self-titled debut album (1993). It was released on October 8, 1993, by LaFace and Arista Records. Written and produced by Kenneth Edmonds, Antonio Reid and Daryl Simmons, the track describes a romance that was fading. As the single was not commercially released in the United States, it was ineligible to chart on the Billboard Hot 100, and it peaked on the Hot 100 Airplay chart at number 48 in early March 1994. It also topped the Hot R&B Airplay chart in late January 1994. "Seven Whole Days" is included on The Essential Toni Braxton and Playlist: The Very Best of Toni Braxton.

== Critical reception ==
In his review of Toni Braxton, John Martinucci from the Gavin Report found that Braxton "creates steamy sensuality" with "Seven Whole Days". Caroline Sullivan from The Guardian noted the singer's "a boys-beware growl" on the "easy-going" track. Pan-European magazine Music & Media wrote that it "could melt even the North Pole." Ralph Tee from Music Week's RM Dance Update stated that it is "the closest Toni gets to Anita Baker territory vocally." Mike Joyce from The Washington Post felt the song "have a depth".

== Music video ==
The official music video for "Seven Whole Days" was shot while Braxton was on tour with her four sisters Traci, Towanda, Trina and Tamar featured as background singers. It was released in 1993 and directed by Lionel C. Martin.

== Track listing ==
- US 12-inch single

A1 "Seven Whole Days" (Ghetto Vibe) – 6:35
A2 "Seven Whole Days" (Ghetto Vibe instrumental) – 6:36
B1 "Seven Whole Days" (album version) – 6:22
B2 "Seven Whole Days" (live version) – 6:15
B3 "The Christmas Song" – 3:25

== Personnel ==
Performers and musicians

- Toni Braxton – Vocals, Background
- Keisha Jackson – Background (tracks 1–6)
- Pamela Copeland – Background (tracks 1–6)
- Tammy Davis – Background (tracks 1–6)

Technical personnel

- A&R – Bryant Reid
- Engineer – Jim "Z" Zumpano
- Engineer, Mixing and Programming – John Frye (tracks 1–6)
- Executive Producer – L.A Reid and Babyface (tracks 1–6)
- Written by – L.A Reid and Babyface (tracks 1–6)
- Published By – ECAF, Sony Songs Inc., Cuff Link Music, Edwin H. Morris & Co.

== Charts ==
Chart (1994)	Peak position
US R&B/Hip-Hop Airplay (Billboard)	1
US Rhythmic Airplay (Billboard)	23

== Cover versions ==
In 2002, bassist Michael Manson presented his version from his album "The Bottom Line." Saxophonist Steve Cole is a special guest on this song.
