= You Mean the World to Me (Toni Braxton song) =

1994 single by Toni Braxton

Single by Toni Braxton

from the album Toni Braxton
- B-side: "Seven Whole Days" (live)
- Released: April 21, 1994
- Studio: LaCoCo (Atlanta, Georgia)
- Genre: Pop-soul
- Length: 4:56
- Label: LaFace
- Songwriters: Antonio "L.A." Reid; Babyface; Daryl Simmons
- Producers: L.A. Reid; Babyface; Daryl Simmons

Toni Braxton singles chronology
"Seven Whole Days" (1993)	"You Mean the World to Me" (1994)	"I Belong to You"/"How Many Ways" (1994)

Music video
- "You Mean the World to Me" on YouTube

Alternative cover
- European CD cover

"You Mean the World to Me" is a song by American singer-songwriter Toni Braxton. It was written and produced by Antonio "L.A." Reid, Kenneth "Babyface" Edmonds, and Daryl Simmons for her self-titled debut album (1993). Selected as the album's fourth single, it was released on CD on April 21, 1994, by LaFace and Arista Records. It peaked at number seven on the US Billboard Hot 100 and number three on the Billboard Hot R&B Singles chart, while reaching the top 10 in Canada. The accompanying music video for "You Mean the World to Me" was directed by Lionel C. Martin. The song received an nomination in the category for Female R&B/soul single at the 1995 Soul Train Music Awards.

== Critical reception ==
Larry Flick from Billboard magazine described the song as a "warm and fuzzy ballad", adding that "finger-poppin' rhythms give motion to a virtual mountain of slick synths. Of course, her increasingly familiar vocal style is a total joy. Watch this one soar up the charts within mere moments." Troy J. Augusto from Cash Box named it Pick of the Week, describing it as "a down-tempo soul burner", that "actually brings Toni closer to the style of Whitney Houston, her closest R&B competitor. Already in heavy rotation at many urban stations, a sure-bet hit." Alan Jones from Music Week named it "a typically tuneful, intelligent and pleasing LA and BabyFace creation, custom-built for Braxton's soulful scale-sliding. As well as being a hit in its own right, expect this to push her album into a higher orbit."

Dele Fadele from NME wrote, "Toni Braxton is gifted with a gospel-tinged voice, but the big-money LA & Babyface production smothers her in molasses." Ralph Tee from the Record Mirror Dance Update commented, "On the back of two hits, this record should face very little resistance as it eases nicely into the charts. Vocally, the track gives Toni another opportunity to showcase one of the best set of tonsils about and forces the shuffling midtempo pace and production to take a back seat." Another Record Mirror editor, James Hamilton, named it a "glorious gurgling sultry swayer" in his weekly dance column.

== Commercial performance ==
In the United States on April 2, 1994, the song debuted on the Billboard Hot 100 at number 86, 20 days ahead of its initial release. On April 9, 1994, in its second week the song moved up number 52. The song continued to rise at numbers 37, 23, 17 in its third, fourth and fifth week. In its sixth, seventh and eighth week the song rose to numbers 16, 14 and 10. On May 28, 1994, the song reached its peak at number seven remaining for one week. The song continued to spend a total of 31 weeks on the Billboard chart before leaving the Hot 100 at number 47 on October 29, 1994.

On June 12, 1994, the song debuted at number 36 in New Zealand and reached its peak at number 32 on July 3, 1994, spending a total of five weeks before leaving the New Zealand Singles Chart. On July 9, 1994, the song peaked at number 30 in the United Kingdom and became a non-mover for two weeks. The song later fell to numbers 40, 50, and 68 in its third, fourth and fifth week respectively. On July 25, 1994, the song peaked at number 69 in Germany and remained in the German Singles Chart for seven weeks before leaving the chart on November 11, 1994. On September 4, 1994, the song peaked at number 49 in Australia lasting one week before falling out of the Australian Singles Chart.

== Music video ==
The music video for "You Mean the World to Me" was directed by American music video director, film director and VJ Lionel C. Martin. The video shows a sequence of Braxton playing the piano in a mansion intercut with scenes with her love interest (portrayed by German-born Michael Calvin Bacon, who later starred as J.B. Reese on Saban's syndicated television series VR Troopers). It stayed in heavy rotation during the spring and summer of 1994. The video was later made available on Braxton's VEVO account on October 25, 2009.

== Track listings and formats ==
- US CD single 1993
1. "You Mean the World to Me" (Radio Edit) – 4:00
2. "You Mean the World to Me" (Radio Edit Remix) – 4:11
3. "You Mean the World to Me" (Extended Mix) – 5:32
4. "Seven Whole Days" (Live) – 6:15
- US CD single 1994
1. "You Mean the World to Me" (Radio Edit) – 4:00
2. "You Mean the World to Me" (Album Version) – 4:54
- UK CD single
1. "You Mean the World to Me" (Radio Edit) – 4:00
2. "You Mean the World to Me" (Extended Mix) – 5:32
3. "Seven Whole Days" (Ghetto Vibe) – 6:32
4. "Seven Whole Days" (Live) – 6:15
- UK and Germany 12-inch single 1994

A1. "You Mean the World to Me" (Extended Mix) – 5:32
B1. "Seven Whole Days" (Ghetto Vibe) – 6:32
B2. "Seven Whole Days" (Ghetto Instrumental) – 6:36

- Europe CD single
1. "You Mean the World to Me" (Radio Edit) – 4:00
2. "Seven Whole Days" (Live Version) (Radio Edit) – 4:42

== Credits and personnel ==
Credits are taken the from liner notes.

Performers and musicians

- Toni Braxton – Vocals, Background
- Kayo – Bass
- Antonio "L.A." Reid – Drums
- Kenny "Babyface" Edmonds – Keyboards
- Vance Taylor – Keyboards
- DeRock – Percussion

Technical

- A&R (A&R Direction) – Bryant Reid
- Copyright – LaFace Records
- Engineer – Jim "Z" Zumpano
- Executive Producer – L.A. Reid And Babyface
- Manufactured By – Arista Records, Inc.
- Mastered By – Herb Powers
- Mastered At – DMS
- Mixed At – Studio LaCoCo
- Mixed By – Dave Way, L.A. Reid
- Photography – Randee St. Nicholas
- Phonographic Copyright – LaFace Records
- Pressed By – Sonopress USA – 65151-01
- Producer – Daryl Simmons, L.A. Reid, Babyface
- Programmed By – John Frye
- Recorded At – Studio LaCoCo
- Recorded At – LaCoCoCabana
- Written By – Daryl Simmons, L.A. Reid, Babyface

== Charts ==
=== Weekly charts ===
Chart (1994)	Peak position
Australia (ARIA)	49
Canada Contemporary Hit Radio (The Record)	7
Canada Top Singles (RPM)	6
Europe (Eurochart Hot 100)	74
Europe (European AC Radio)	14
Europe (European Dance Radio)	3
Europe (European Hit Radio)	22
Germany (GfK)	69
Iceland (Íslenski Listinn Topp 40)	21
Israel (Israeli Singles Chart)	18
Netherlands (Dutch Top 40 Tipparade)	13
Netherlands (Single Top 100 Tipparade)	4
New Zealand (Recorded Music NZ)	32
Panama (UPI)	8
Scottish Singles Sales (Official Charts)	44
UK Singles (Official Charts)	30
UK Airplay (Music Week)	15
US Billboard Hot 100	7
US Adult Contemporary (Billboard)	4
US Hot R&B/Hip-Hop Songs (Billboard)	3
US Pop Airplay (Billboard)	4
US Rhythmic Airplay (Billboard)	7
US Cash Box Top 100	2

=== Year-end charts ===
Chart (1994)	Position
Canada Top Singles (RPM)	45
Europe (European Dance Radio)	23
US Billboard Hot 100	17
US Adult Contemporary (Billboard)	13
US Hot R&B Singles (Billboard)	15
US Cash Box Top 100	18

== Certifications ==
Region	Certification	Certified units/sales
United States (RIAA)	Gold	500,000^{^}
^{^} Shipments figures based on certification alone.

== Release history ==
Release dates and formats for "You Mean the World to Me"
Region	Date	Format(s)	Label(s)	Ref(s).
Japan	April 21, 1994	Mini-CD	LaFace; Arista	
Germany	May 2, 1994	CD	LaFace; Arista	
United States	May 2, 1994	CD; cassette; vinyl	LaFace	
United Kingdom	May 2, 1994	CD	LaFace; Arista	
Australia	May 30, 1994	CD; cassette	LaFace	
Sweden	June 6, 1994	CD	LaFace; Arista	
United Kingdom	June 27, 1994	7-inch vinyl; 12-inch vinyl; CD; cassette	LaFace; Arista	
