= Live Out Your Love =

2020 single by Kem featuring Toni Braxton

Single by Kem featuring Toni Braxton

from the album Love Always Wins
- Released: July 30, 2020
- Length: 4:13
- Label: Motown
- Songwriter(s): Kim Owens
- Producer(s): Kem; Derek "DOA" Allen

Kem singles chronology
"Lie to Me" (2020)	"Live Out Your Love" (2020)	"Stuck on You" (2022)

Toni Braxton singles chronology
"Do It" (2020)	"Live Out Your Love" (2020)	"Dance" (2020)

"Live Out Your Love" is a song by American singer Kem featuring Toni Braxton. Recorded for his sixth studio album Love Always Wins (2018), the duet was produced by Kem and Derek "DOA" Allen and released as the album's second single on July 30, 2020, along with the pre-order launched for the album. It peaked at number one on the US Adult R&B Songs chart, and number 14 on the US R&B/Hip-Hop Airplay chart.

== Background ==
"Live Out Your Love" was written by Kem along with fellow R&B singer Toni Braxton and songwriter Derek "DOA" Allen, while production was helmed by the latter. Built upon a "soothing instrumental", the duet has the pair singing about an everlasting love that seems to get better by the day. The collaboration was sparked in 2019 when Kem was invited to perform at Braxton's Valentine's Day concert at the Fox Theatre in Detroit. While working on his 2020 album Love Always Wins, Kem began to envision "Live Out Your Love" as a duet and asked Braxton to join him. Due to the COVID-19 pandemic, Braxton recorded her vocals on her own and sent them back to Kem.

== Charts ==
=== Weekly charts ===
Weekly chart performance for "Live Out Your Love"
Chart (2020)	Peak position
US Adult R&B Songs (Billboard)	1
US R&B/Hip-Hop Airplay (Billboard)	14

=== Year-end charts ===
2020 year-end chart performance for Live Out Your Love"
Chart (2020)	Position
US Adult R&B Songs (Billboard)	39

=== Year-end charts ===
2021 year-end chart performance for Live Out Your Love"
Chart (2021)	Position
US Adult R&B Songs (Billboard)	15
