= Gotta Move On (Toni Braxton song) =

Single by Toni Braxton featuring H.E.R.

from the album Spell My Name
- Released: August 24, 2020
- Studio: Brandon's Way Recording Studios (Los Angeles, CA)
- Length: 4:18
- Label: Island
- Songwriters: Toni Braxton; Jeremih Felton; Kenneth Coby
- Producer: Soundz

Toni Braxton singles chronology
"Dance" (2020)	"Gotta Move On" (2020)

"Gotta Move On" is a song by American singer Toni Braxton. It was written and produced by Braxton along with Jeremih Felton and Kenneth Coby for her tenth studio album Spell My Name (2020), while production was helmed by Coby under his moniker Soundz, with Paul Boutin and Braxton serving as vocal producers. A slow-burning anthem about getting past a failed relationship, "Gotta Move On" features a guitar solo from singer H.E.R. The song was released as the album's third single on August 24, 2020, and became Braxton's eleventh chart topper on the US Adult R&B Songs chart.

== Chart performance ==
"Gotta Move On" reached number one on the US Billboard Adult R&B Songs dated February 20, 2021, becoming Braxton's eleventh chart topper and second single from Spell My Name after "Do It" (2020) to do so, tying her with Alicia Keys for the most number-one singles since the Adult R&B Airplay list began in 1993. Braxton had previously led the rank among all artists for most number ones from 1996 until Keys surpassed her in 2008 and retained sole possession of the feat until 2021. Beyond its success on the Adult R&B Songs, “Gotta Move On” also reached number 12 on the US R&B/Hip-Hop Airplay chart.

== Music video ==
Braxton reteamed with director Mike Ho to film a music video for "Gotta Move On" which was released online on October 23, 2020. In the "cinematic" video, a couple endures a difficult break in their relationship. H.E.R. makes a guest appearance in the clip.

== Credits and personnel ==
Credits lifted from the liner notes of Spell My Name.

- Paul Boutin – engineer, mixing, recording, vocal producer
- Toni Braxton – vocal producer, vocals, writer
- Kenneth Coby – engineer, producer, writer
- Jeremih Felton – writer
- H.E.R. – guitar solo
- Raymon "Big Play Ray" Holten – bass, guitar
- Demonte Posey – programming, strings arrangement
- Herb Powers, Jr. – mastering
- Erick Walls – additional guitars

== Charts ==
=== Weekly charts ===
Weekly chart performance for "Gotta Move On"
Chart (2020–21)	Peak position
US Adult R&B Songs (Billboard)	1
US Hot R&B Songs (Billboard)	17
US R&B/Hip-Hop Airplay (Billboard)	12

=== Year-end charts ===
Year-end chart performance for "Gotta Move On"
Chart (2021)	Position
US Adult R&B Songs (Billboard)	15

== Release history ==
List of release dates, showing region, release format, label, and reference
Region	Date	Version	Format	Label	Ref.
Various	August 24, 2020	Album Version	digital download; streaming	Island	
