= Dance (Toni Braxton song) =

Single by Toni Braxton

from the album Spell My Name
- Released: July 31, 2020
- Studio: Brandon's Way Recording Studios (Los Angeles, CA); EastWest Studios (Los Angeles, CA)
- Length: 3:52
- Label: Island
- Songwriters: Toni Braxton; Antonio Dixon
- Producers: Braxton; Dixon

Toni Braxton singles chronology
"Live Out Your Love" (2020)	"Dance" (2020)	"Gotta Move On" (2020)

"Dance" is a song by American singer Toni Braxton. It was written and produced by Braxton and Antonio Dixon for her tenth studio album Spell My Name (2020). The song was released as the album's second single on July 31, 2020. It peaked at number 17 on the US Adult R&B Songs chart.

== Background ==
"Dance" was written Braxton and Antonio Dixon. Dixon noted that "Dance" is "for those that want to go rollerskating. It has some 70’s disco to it."

== Music video ==
A music video for "Dance," directed by Mike Ho, was released online on August 4, 2020.

== Track listings ==
Digital single
No.	Title	Length
1.	"Dance" (Album Version)	3:52

Remix single
No.	Title	Length
1.	"Dance" (Dave Audé Remix)	4:16
2.	"Dance" (Dave Audé Remix – Extended)	5:56
3.	"Dance" (Dave Audé Remix – Extended Instrumental)	5:56

== Credits and personnel ==
Credits lifted from the liner notes of Spell My Name.

- Paul Boutin – engineer, mixing, percussion, vocal producer
- Toni Braxton – producer, writer, vocals
- Antonio Dixon – instruments, producer, writer
- Reginald Dozier – recording
- Demonte Posey – horns, strings
- Herb Powers Jr. – mastering
- Erick Walls – guitar
- Benjamin Wright – strings

== Charts ==
Chart (2020)	Peak position
US Adult R&B Songs (Billboard)	17

== Release history ==
List of release dates, showing region, release format, label, and reference
Region	Date	Version	Format	Label	Ref.
Various	May 15, 2020	Dave Audé Remix	digital download; streaming	Island	
Various	July 31, 2020	Album Version	digital download; streaming	Island	
Various	October 16, 2020	Gozzi Remix	digital download; streaming	Island	
