= Spell My Name =

Studio album by Toni Braxton
- Released: August 28, 2020
- Studio: Brandon's Way (Los Angeles, CA); EastWest (Los Angeles, CA); Mass Confusion (Los Angeles, CA); PM Mastering (New Jersey)
- Genre: R&B
- Length: 35:25
- Label: Island
- Producer: Paul Boutin; Chris Braide; Toni Braxton; Ghara "PK" Degeddingseze; Antonio Dixon; Kenneth "Babyface" Edmonds; Hannon Lane; Missy Elliott; Akeel Henry; Jordon Manswell; Jonathan Martin; Soundz; Dapo Torimiro

Toni Braxton chronology
Sex & Cigarettes (2018)	Spell My Name (2020)

Singles from Spell My Name
- 1. "Do It" Released: April 6, 2020; 2. "Dance" Released: July 31, 2020; 3. "Gotta Move On" Released: August 24, 2020

Spell My Name is the tenth studio album by American singer Toni Braxton. It was released by Island Records on August 28, 2020. Her debut with the record label, following a short-lived stint with Def Jam Recordings on her ninth album Sex & Cigarettes (2018), Braxton assumed more control on Spell My Name, again taking a greater hand in writing and producing the material. Her collaborations included frequent collaborators Paul Boutin, Antonio Dixon, and Babyface as well as singers and songwriters such as Patrick "J. Que" Smith, Chris Braide, Dapo Torimiro, Soundz, Kirby Lauryen, and Missy Elliott.

The album received generally positive reviews by music critics who complimented its production standards but criticized its length and the preponderance of balladry on the album. On the charts, Spell My Name failed to repeat the success of Sex & Cigarettes, becoming Braxton's lowest-charting yet with a peak at number 163 on the US Billboard 200. Its release was preceded by the singles "Do It" and "Dance", the former of which peaked at number one on the US Billboard Adult R&B Songs, and followed by "Gotta Move On" featuring singer H.E.R., Braxton's eleventh topper on the chart.

== Background ==
Braxton began work on her tenth studio album several months after the release of her Grammy Award-nominated previous project Sex & Cigarettes (2018). Making the album, which Braxton cited as the most fun she has had in years, she reteamed with longtime contributors such as Antonio Dixon and Babyface but also consulted new collaborators to work with her, including Soundz, Patrick "J. Que" Smith, Ghara "PK" Degeddingseze, Chris Braide, and Dapo Torimiro. Her team also reached out to rapper Missy Elliott who produced on and recorded additional vocals for a remix version of "Do It." The remix, along with the original version, also appears on the final track listing.

As with her previous two albums, Braxton assumed more control, again taking a greater hand in writing the material, while also producing some of the records herself. While 85 per cent of Spell My Name was completed before the rise of the COVID-19 pandemic, the singer was forced to complete several songs in the closet. When asked about what was it like working during quarantine, she elaborated: "It wasn't that difficult for me because most of my album was done. It was just about putting it together, deciding the sequence, the order, mixing and mastering." Braxton would select songs in her car, listening to them while driving around, a process she described as "the best thing because you can hear the songs on the radio and then play your songs right after hear how it sounds."

The album was named after the same-titled album track which is about an older woman being with a younger guy. According to Braxton, it acknowledges her legendary status: "I have been in the music business a long time. So I think it’s OK for me to be confident in myself and the album title refers to that, like ‘Spell my name, I’m Toni Braxton — T.O.N.I B.R.A.X.T.O.N’ [...] I've been in this business for a long time and I've been blessed, so, put some respect on my name a little bit [...] I just thought it was a cool title to be honest."

== Singles ==
"Do It" was released by Island Records as the album's first single on April 6, 2020, also serving as Braxton's debut with the label. It peaked at number one on the US Billboard Adult R&B Songs chart, becoming Braxton's tenth topper on the chart. On June 26, 2020, Island released a Missy Elliott-produced remix version of "Do It" featuring additional vocals from Elliott. On May 15, 2020, Dave Audé's remix of second single "Dance" was released. The album version of the track, produced by Braxton and Antonio Dixon, was released on July 31, 2020, with the accompanying music video being released on August 5, 2020. In further support of Spell My Name, "Gotta Move On" featuring singer H.E.R. was released to Braxton's YouTube account on August 24, 2020. Released as the album's third and final single, the song peaked at number one on the US Adult R&B Songs chart in February 2021, tying Braxton with Alicia Keys for the most champs since the Adult R&B Airplay list began in 1993.

== Critical reception ==
Professional ratings
Aggregate scores
Source	Rating
Metacritic	71/100
Review scores
Source	Rating
AllMusic	3/5 stars
Clash	6/10
The Guardian	4/5 stars
Idolator	3.5/5 stars
musicOMH	3/5 stars
Pitchfork	7.0/10

Spell My Name received generally positive reviews from music critics. At Metacritic, which assigns a normalized rating out of 100 to reviews from mainstream critics, the album received an average score of 71, which indicates "generally favorable" reception, based on six reviews. Kemi Alemoru, writing for The Guardian, called the album "a full-bodied record that exhibits Braxton's stylistic and vocal range." She found that "Braxton – once an R&B trailblazer – is still hungry to be a part of the genre's resurgence [and] hasn't lost her broad vocal range or her ability to slot into multiple mood playlists. It has everything you want from a full-bodied R&B record: songs to cry to, vibe to, and make babies to."

In his review for Variety, Jeff Vashista named Spell My Name "possibly her strongest album since her halcyon period in the mid-to-late '90's [...] Braxton co-wrote nearly every song on the album, and she and her collaborators have succeeded in deftly meshing her signature minor-key R&B sound with production and vocal arrangements that keep things classy but contemporary [...] This is a not an R&B record made on a bedroom laptop: It's expensive sounding, with a stellar cast of collaborators and dramatic orchestrations." Idolator's Mike Wass found that Spell My Name "is particularly successful when Toni plays to her strengths – namely old-school soul and silky smooth ballads [but] is less successful, however, when [she] tries to up the tempo." He remarked however, that "ultimately, these missteps do little to diminish the pleasure of Spell My Name."

AllMusic editor Andy Kellman found that Braxton spends most of "the set succumbing to desire recognized as ill-fated, mourning unfulfillment, waving off a cheating ex, and swearing during the emotional peak [...] The material tends toward routine, but Braxton's elegant distress cuts through everything with conviction." Robin Murray from Clash was critical with the "preponderance of slo-mo balladry" on the album, writing that it "is hard to fault, then, but also difficult to truly love [...] It's far from a failure, with Spell My Name boasting moments of rich maturity, the kind of lyrical openness that has always made her work so intriguing. Yet there's also an unwillingness to embrace contemporary movements in R&B." musicOMH writer Ben Devlin called Spell My Name "a veritable pot luck of styles, some of which work [...] The album is brief, almost EP length, and doesn't end nearly as well as it begins, but Spell My Name still features some great tunes."

== Chart performance ==
The album debuted at number 163 on the US Billboard 200, as well as number 21 on the Top R&B Albums in the week ending September 12, 2020. This marked Braxton's lowest-charting debut, and her first album to miss the top 100 since her 2001 Christmas album Snowflakes peaked at number 119.

== Track listing ==
Spell My Name track listing
No.	Title	Writer(s)	Producer(s)	Length
1.	"Dance"	Toni Braxton; Antonio Dixon	Dixon; Braxton^{[a]}; Boutin^{[b]}	3:52
2.	"Do It" (with Missy Elliott)	Braxton; Dixon; Kenneth "Babyface" Edmonds; Percy Bady; Melissa Elliott	Elliott; Hannon Lane^{[c]}	3:24
3.	"Gotta Move On" (featuring H.E.R.)	Braxton; Jeremih Felton; Kenneth Coby	Soundz; Braxton^{[a]}; Boutin^{[b]}	4:18
4.	"Fallin'"	Braxton; Ashante "Taranchyla" Reid; Jonathan Martin; Jordon Manswell; Kam Corvet	Manswell; Braxton^{[a]}; Martin; Boutin^{[b]}	2:57
5.	"Spell My Name"	Braxton; Akeel Henry; Dixon; Johnny Yukon	Braxton^{[a]}; Henry; Dixon; Boutin^{[b]}	3:21
6.	"O.V.E.Rr."	Braxton; Dixon; Angelica Vila; Patrick "J. Que" Smith	Braxton^{[a]}; Dixon; Boutin^{[b]}	3:10
7.	"Happy Without Me"	Braxton; Kirby Lauryen; Frank Nitty; Ghara "PK" Degeddingseze; Kevin Ross	Degeddingseze; Braxton^{[a]}; Boutin^{[b]}	3:46
8.	"Saturday Night"	Braxton; Badrilla "Bibi" Bourelly; Chris Braide; Tyler Johnson	Braide; Braxton^{[a]}; Boutin^{[b]}	4:01
9.	"Do It" (Original version)	Braxton; Dixon; Edmonds; Bady	Dixon; Braxton^{[a]}; Boutin^{[b]}	2:52
10.	"Nothin'" (Bonus track)	Edmonds; Dapo Torimiro; Kam Parker; Kameron Glasper	Edmonds; Torimiro; Braxton^{[a]}; Boutin^{[b]}	3:44
Total length:				35:25

Notes

- ^{^a} denotes producer and vocal producer
- ^{^b} denotes vocal producer only
- ^{^c} denotes additional producer

== Personnel and credits ==
Adapted from album booklet.

=== Recording locations ===
- Brandon's Way Recording Studios (Los Angeles, California)
- East West Studios (Los Angeles, California)
- Mass Confusion Studios (Los Angeles, California)
- PM Mastering (New Jersey)

=== Personnel ===
Musicians

- Toni Braxton – vocals
- Missy Elliott – featured artist (2)
- H.E.R. – featured artist (3), guitar solo (3)
- Babyface – electric guitars (10)
- Percy Bady – programming (9), keyboards (9)
- Paul Boutin – percussions (1, 4–5, 9–10)
- Chris Braide – bass (8), keys (8), guitar (8)
- Ghara "PK" Degeddingseze – keys (7), strings (7)
- Antonio Dixon – programming (1, 9), bass (1), keyboards (1, 9), horns arrangement (1)
- Raymon "Big Play Ray" Holten – guitar (3), bass (3)
- Pete Johnson – strings (5)
- Hannon Lane – programming (2), guitar (2), bass (2), keyboards (2), drums (2), percussion (2)
- Jordon Manswell – drums (4), percussion (4), beatbox vocals (4)
- Jonathan Martin – keyboards (4)
- Sammy Perez – guitar (5)
- Demonte Posey – strings arrangement (1, 3–4, 6, 8–9), horns arrangement (1), programming (3–4, 6, 8–9), drums (10), keyboards programming (10)
- Dapo Torimiro – bass (10)
- Eric Walls – guitar (1, 3)
- Benjamin Wright – strings arrangement (1)
- Johnny Yukon – additional vocals (5)

Technical

- Toni Braxton – executive production, production (1, 4–6, 8–10), vocal production (1, 3–10)
- Babyface – production (10)
- Darcus Beese – executive production
- Paul Boutin – co-executive production, vocal production (1, 3–10), mixing (1, 3–10), engineering (1, 3, 10), vocals recording (2), recording (3–10)
- Chris Braide – production (8)
- Ghara "PK" Degeddingseze – production (7)
- Antonio Dixon – production (1, 5–6, 9)
- Reggie Dozier – strings recording (1)
- Missy Elliott – production (2), additional engineering (2), mixing (2), remixing (2)
- Akeel Henry – production (5)
- K Y – additional engineering (2), mixing (2)
- Hannon Lane – co-production (2), recording (2), remixing (2)
- Jordon Manswell – production (4)
- Jonathan Martin – production (4)
- Herb Powers Jr. – mastering
- Soundz – production (3), engineering (3)
- Dapo Torimiro – production (10)

Design

- Sandra Brummels – creative direction
- Vol S. Davis III – business affairs
- Paul Lane – package production
- Miller Mobley – photography
- Ashley Pawlak – art direction

== Charts ==
Chart performance for Spell My Name
Chart (2020)	Peak position
UK Album Downloads (OCC)	21
UK R&B Albums (OCC)	3
US Billboard 200	163
US Top R&B Albums (Billboard)	21

== Release history ==
Spell My Name release history
Region	Date	Format(s)	Label	Ref.
Various	August 28, 2020	CD; digital download; streaming	Island	
United States	December 4, 2020	Vinyl	Island	
