= Long as I Live (Toni Braxton song) =

2018 single by Toni Braxton

Single by Toni Braxton

from the album Sex & Cigarettes
- Released: February 9, 2018
- Studio: Brandon's Way Recording Studios (Los Angeles, CA)
- Length: 4:51
- Label: Def Jam
- Songwriters: Toni Braxton; Paul Boutin; Antonio Dixon
- Producer: Dixon

Toni Braxton singles chronology
"Deadwood" (2017)	"Long as I Live" (2018)	"FOH" (2018)

Music video
- "Long as I Live" on YouTube

"Long as I Live" is a song by American singer Toni Braxton from her eighth studio album Sex & Cigarettes (2018). Written by Braxton, Paul Boutin, and Antonio Dixon, who also produced the track, it is a "soulful '90s-style" R&B and soul track that finds the singer struggling with breaking up and moving on from her past lover. The song was released on February 9, 2018 by Def Jam Recordings as the second single from the album, with an accompanying music video premiered on March 23, 2018 to coincide with the parent album's release.

Upon its release, "Long as I Live" received positive reviews from music critics for its "nostalgic" feel, with Braxton's voice described "as strong as ever". The song won the 50th NAACP Image Award for Outstanding Song, Traditional, and also earned Braxton nominations for Best R&B Performance and Best R&B Song at the 61st Annual Grammy Awards, the former being her fifth overall and first nomination in eighteen years since "He Wasn't Man Enough".

The song also attained commercial success for the singer in the States, becoming her eight chart-topper for five consecutive weeks on the US Billboard Adult R&B Songs, thus becoming the artist with the second most number one titles on the chart. It was also her first top fifteen entry on the R&B/Hip-Hop Airplay chart in nearly eighteen years since "Just Be a Man About It", and her first single to enter the component UK Singles Downloads Chart, peaking at number fifty-four. Braxton has since appeared on several daytime shows to promote the song, and eventually embarked on the eponymous As Long as I Live Tour to further perform the song and its parental album throughout 2019.

== Background and promotion ==
On February 27, 2018, Braxton appeared on the daytime show Loose Women to promote "Long as I Live" and her upcoming album Sex & Cigarettes. A behind-the-scenes video was released on Braxton's Instagram account featuring the auditions of dancers for the music video. On March 21, 2018, she posted a 26-second teaser of the music video, announcing that it would premiere on WEtv after the season six premiere of Braxton Family Values on March 22, 2018.

== Music video ==
The audio video was released to Braxton's VEVO channel on February 9, 2018. The music video was recorded on March 6, 2018, and released on March 23, 2018. The music video also features Braxton's younger sisters, Towanda and Tamar Braxton. Since its release the video has garnered over 130 million views on YouTube. Model Herly Ulysse starred in the video.

== Credits and personnel ==
Credits adapted from the liner notes of Sex & Cigarettes.

- Walter Barnes – bass
- Paul Boutin – mixing, instruments, vocal producer
- Toni Braxton – vocals, vocal producer, writer
- Antonio Dixon – instruments, producer, writer
- Erick Walls – electric guitar

== Charts ==
=== Weekly charts ===
Chart (2018)	Peak position
Scotland Singles (Official Charts)	88
UK Singles Downloads (Official Charts)	54
US Adult R&B Songs (Billboard)	1
US Bubbling Under R&B/Hip-Hop Songs (Billboard)	6
US Hot R&B Songs (Billboard)	15
US R&B/Hip-Hop Airplay (Billboard)	15
US R&B/Hip-Hop Digital Song Sales (Billboard)	20

=== Year-end charts ===
Chart (2018)	Position
US Adult R&B Songs (Billboard)	6

== Release history ==
Region	Date	Format	Label	Ref
Various	February 9, 2018	Digital download, streaming	Def Jam	
