= Antonio Dixon (songwriter) =

American singer-songwriter

- Also known as: Antonio "Tony" Dixon
- Genres: R&B; hip hop
- Occupations: Songwriter; singer; record producer
- Website: instagram.com/antoniodixonmusic

Antonio "Tony" Dixon is an American songwriter, singer and record producer, also known for his work with production duo The Underdogs and Eric Dawkins under the production moniker The Pentagon.

== Career ==
Dixon began his songwriting and production career as an associate member of production duo The Underdogs. Along with Harvey Mason Jr. and Damon Thomas and a wider collective, also consisting of Tank, Eric Dawkins and Steve Russell, he co-crafted several singles, including Omarion's "O" (2004), "Naked" (2005), and Monica's "Sideline Ho" (2007), predominantly serving as an instrumentalist and arranger on the tracks.

In the late 2000s, Dixon and Dawkins formed the production team The Pentagon. A departure from the R&B sounds of his previous works, the duo worked with a wider range of artists and sounds, particularly in the pop and gospel genres, including Kristinia DeBarge and Justin Bieber. Following their collaboration on Babyface's 2005 album Grown & Sexy along with The Underdogs, Babyface asked Dixon to work with him on Beyoncé's 2011 album 4 on which they co-produced the single "Best Thing I Never Had".

In 2018, Dixon produced on Toni Braxton's ninth studio album Sex & Cigarettes (2018). Its leading single "Long as I Live," produced by Dixon, became her eight on the Billboard Adult R&B Songs and earned two nominations for Best R&B Performance and Best R&B Song at the 61st Annual Grammy Awards.

== Selected production credits ==
Year	Song	Artist	Album
2008	"Do for You"	Chanté Moore	Love the Woman
2011	"Best Thing I Never Had"	Beyoncé	4
2011	"Dreaming"	Beyoncé	4
2012	"That's When I Knew"	Alicia Keys	Girl on Fire
2013	"Baby I"	Ariana Grande	Yours Truly
2013	"Honeymoon Avenue"	Ariana Grande	Yours Truly
2013	"Lovin' It"	Ariana Grande	Yours Truly
2013	"Tattooed Heart"	Ariana Grande	Yours Truly
2013	"You'll Never Know"	Ariana Grande	Yours Truly
2016	"Let Me Know"	After 7	Timeless
2016	"More Than Friends"	After 7	Timeless
2018	"Long as I Live"	Toni Braxton	Sex & Cigarettes
2018	"Sex & Cigarettes"	Toni Braxton	Sex & Cigarettes
2018	"The Christmas Song"	Jessie J	This Christmas Day
2018	"Winter Wonderland"	Jessie J	This Christmas Day
2020	"Dance"	Toni Braxton	Spell My Name
2020	"Do It"	Toni Braxton	Spell My Name
2024	"Can't Get You"	Jaehyun	J
2026	"Goodbye Goodmorning"	Leigh-Anne	My Ego Told Me To
