= Soundz =

American record producer (born 1983)

- Born: Kenneth Charles Coby; August 1, 1983 (age 43); Milwaukee, Wisconsin, U.S.
- Genres: Hip hop, R&B
- Occupations: Record producer; songwriter; rapper
- Instrument: Sampler
- Years active: 2006–present
- Labels: Sony/ATV, US

Kenneth Charles Coby (born August 1, 1983), known professionally as Soundz, is an American record producer from Milwaukee, Wisconsin. He has been credited with production work on commercially successful recordings in hip hop and R&B, often in collaboration with fellow producer and mentor, Tricky Stewart. These include the Billboard Hot 100-top 50 singles "Confident" by Justin Bieber, "Love in This Club, Pt. II" by Usher, and "Throw Sum Mo" by Rae Sremmurd, as well as other charting singles including "Foreign" by Trey Songz, "Go Girl" by Pitbull, and "The Body" by Wale.

== Tracks produced ==
The following list of tracks are those which have been produced by Soundz, or co-produced with Soundz.

=== 2006 ===
One Chance - "One Chance (album sampler)"

- Look At Her featuring Fabo of D4L, released as One Chance's first single

Filthy Rich - "Filty By Association"

- Mobbin' (Hat Down Low) featuring Young Boss, released as part of a mixtape
- Get Money released as part of a mixtape

One Chance - "Out Da Chi"

- Out Da Chi the second track produced for One Chance, promo'd but didn't make a commercial release

=== 2007 ===
2 Much - "Knock Out"

- Knock Out produced by soundz, at the same time as "Holla At Ya Boy" which is produced by Darkchild

Al Grean - "Sampler / Unreleased"

- Throwin' Ones featuring Courtney of One Chance
- Red Carpet recorded for including on a possible future album

Atozzio - "He Say She Say"

- He Say She Say

Young Boss - "In New Jerzey"

- In New Jerzey featured on Black Noize Entertainment's Best of Jerzey CD

Pitbull - "The Boatlift"

- Go Girl featuring Trina & Young Boss, also released as a single

i15

- In the Studio
- Blazed and Faded
- Work Ya way up
- Fix
- 100 degrees
- White Nike ya

=== 2008 ===
Usher - Here I Stand

- Love in This Club, Pt. II (featuring Beyoncé & Lil Wayne)

Brandy - Human

- A Capella (Something's Missing)

Sterling Simms - Yours, Mine and the Truth- Release Date: 12/23/08

- Doin Dat
- Boom Boom Room (Making Music)
- Playa

Brutha- Brutha

- Ghost

Noel Gourdin - After My Time

- Led You On

Asia Cruise - Who is Asia Cruise (Album shelved)

- Walk Me Out

=== 2009 ===
Huey - Strictly Business

- No Make Up (featuring Trey Songz)

Chilli - Bi-Polar

- Flirt

One Chance - TBA

- Out Dem Clothes
- Gold Digger
- Neverland

Trey Songz -Ready

- Brand New

LeToya Luckett - Lady Love

- Lazy

=== 2010 ===
Ciara - Basic Instinct

- Gimmie Dat
- Heavy Rotation

Rihanna - Loud

- Skin

N-Dubz - Love.Live.Life

- Living For The Moment

=== 2011 ===
Jawan Harris - N/A

- Another Planet (featuring Chris Brown)
- Scholarship

Bryan J - N/A

- Let Me Take You Out (featuring Travis Porter)

Flo Rida - N/A

- Broke It Down

Gail Scott - N/A

- Jack N' Jill

Kelly Rowland - N/A

- Make Believe

=== 2012 ===
Justin Bieber - Believe

- Out of Town Girl

=== 2013 ===
Ciara - Ciara (album)

- Sophomore
- DUI
- Boy Outta Here (featuring Rick Ross)

Justin Bieber - Journals

- Confident (featuring Chance the Rapper)
- What's Hatnin' (featuring Future)
- Flatline

=== 2014 ===
Justin Bieber - Unreleased

- Infectious

Audio

- Supermodel Ft. Tyga Audio
- Yea Ya Audio
- Meet Me At The Club Ft. Khalil Audio
- For Sure Ft. Lil Za

Trey Songz - Trigga

- Foreign
- Foreign Remix (featuring Justin Bieber)

Chris Brown - X

- 101 (Interlude)

K. Michelle - Anybody Wanna Buy a Heart?

- Hard to Do

Kid Ink - My Own Lane

- Star Player

=== 2015 ===
Rae Sremmurd - SremmLife

- Throw Sum Mo (featuring Nicki Minaj & Young Thug)

Casey Veggies - Live & Grow

- A Little Time

Justin Bieber - Purpose

- No Sense (featuring Travis Scott) (produced with Mike Dean)

Jeremih - Late Nights

- Woosah (featuring Juicy J & Twista) (produced with Pharrell Williams)
- Royalty (featuring Big Sean & Future) (produced with Metro Boomin & Dre Moon)
- Paradise (produced with Vinylz & Mick Schultz)

=== 2020 ===
Toni Braxton - Spell My Name

- Gotta Move On (featuring H.E.R.) (produced with Jeremih)
