= As Long as I Live =

As Long as I Live may refer to:

- As Long as I Live (1946 film), a 1946 French-Italian drama film (French title: Tant que je vivrai)
- Jab Tak Hai Jaan (English title: As Long as I Live), a 2012 Indian romantic drama film by Yash Chopra
- "As Long as I Live" (Arlen-Koehler song), a 1934 song composed by Harold Arlen, with lyrics by Ted Koehler
- "As Long as I Live" (George Jones song), a 1968 song by George Jones, written by Roy Acuff
- As Long As I Live Tour, a 2019 concert tour by Toni Braxton

== See also ==
- As Long as I Love, 1970 compilation album by Dolly Parton
