= Deadwood (Toni Braxton song) =

Single by Toni Braxton

from the album Sex & Cigarettes
- Released: September 14, 2017
- Recorded: 2017
- Studio: Eastcote Studios (London)
- Genre: R&B; soul; acoustic
- Length: 3:59
- Label: Def Jam
- Songwriters: Toni Braxton; Royce Doherty; Kwame Ogoo; Fred Ball
- Producers: Braxton; Paul Boutin; Ball

Toni Braxton singles chronology
"Roller Coaster" (2014)	"Deadwood" (2017)	"Long as I Live" (2018)

Music video
- "Deadwood" on YouTube

"Deadwood" is a song by American recording artist Toni Braxton released on September 14, 2017. The song serves as the lead single from Braxton's eighth studio album Sex & Cigarettes (2018). Written by Braxton, Royce Doherty, Kwame Ogoo and Fred Ball and produced by Ball.

== Background and release ==
"Deadwood" was initially written and performed by singer-songwriter Emil Kwame Ogoo (simply known as EMiL at the time). Emil's version was originally released in 2012, with a music video being released earlier in December 2011. Emil later sold the song which led to Braxton receiving and recording it. On August 25, 2017, it was announced that director Bille Woodruff was directing a new music video for Braxton confirming the name of a new single titled "Deadwood". On September 5, 2017, in an interview with The Insider, Braxton confirmed the title of her upcoming eighth studio album Sex & Cigarettes stating "I feel like I'm older, I wanna say what I feel. I don't wanna be censored". Braxton released the cover art of the single on September 12, 2017.

== Critical reception ==
The song was met with positive reviews from critics. That Grape Juice favored the track "Ever in fine-form, this gorgeous guitar-led offering proves that her tone has lost none of its buttery brilliance. The production serves as a slick, crisp vehicle driving the song's lyrical agenda and does so dynamically. Marvellous melody and memorable hook too." Essence stated: "Deadwood, is the first step to revealing an uncensored Braxton. It's the debut track from her upcoming album, which is set for release at the top of 2018, and sees the singer exploring a complicated love." Rap-Up gave a positive review of the track stating "Toni Braxton comes back to life with 'Deadwood,' the first single off her forthcoming album Sex & Cigarettes. Over guitar strums, hard drums, and soothing violin strings, the R&B songbird sings about heartbreak and rejuvenation with a soulful air."

== Music video ==
The music video was filmed on August 24, 2017, and directed by Bille Woodruff. The audio video for the song was released to Braxton's Vevo account on September 14, 2017. The video premiered on October 6, 2017.

== Credits and personnel ==
Credits adapted from the liner notes of Sex & Cigarettes.

- Jonathan Allen – recording
- Fred Ball – instruments, producer, writer
- Paul Boutin – mixing, percussion
- Toni Braxton – producer, vocals, writer
- Royce Doherty – writer
- Ben Epstein – bass
- Clarissa Farran – strings arranger
- Steve Fitzmaurice – recording
- Earl Harvin – drums
- Kwame Ogoo – backing vocalist, guitar, writer
- Hilary Skewes – stings contractor

== Charts ==
Chart (2017–18)	Peak position
US Adult R&B Songs (Billboard)	7
US R&B/Hip-Hop Airplay (Billboard)	34

== Release history ==
Region	Date	Format	Label	Ref
United States	September 14, 2017	Digital download	Def Jam	
