= Gotta Move On =

Gotta Move On may refer to:

- "Gotta Move On" (Toni Braxton song), 2020
- "Gotta Move On" (Diddy song), 2022
- "Gotta Move On", a song by Monica from the album The Makings of Me
