= Dapo Torimiro =

Nigerian musician

- Also known as: Dapo
- Origin: Lagos, Nigeria
- Genres: R&B, hip hop
- Occupations: Singer, songwriter, record producer
- Instruments: Vocals, bass guitar, Upright Bass, Guitar, Piano, Organ, Keyboards, Drums, Programmer
- Website: Dapomiroworks.com

Dapo Torimiro is a Nigerian songwriter, record producer, multi-instrumentalist and singer. Born in Lagos, he has worked in the music industry in the US for several years writing and producing music for artists' album projects, touring with numerous artists, as well as scoring various television and film projects.

== Music career ==
Dapo's big break was placing the song "Quickly" (co-written with Frank Ocean and the award-winning production duo Midi Mafia (50 Cent, Fantasia)) on nine-time Grammy winner John Legend's third studio album, Evolver, which was released in Fall of 2008. Featuring multi-platinum-selling artist Brandy, "Quickly" received early industry buzz as not only an inspired, sleek duet featuring R&B/pop music's leading artists, but also as one of the album's stand-out gems. Dapo, Frank Ocean and Midi Mafia co-wrote (and Dapo/Midi Mafia produced) approximately 20+ songs, some of which were released by Frank as part of his "Lonny Breaux Collection" which includes a demo version of Justin Bieber's "Bigger" (My World) as well as "Bedtime Stories", "Done", "Lights", "Quickly" (Frank's demo version), "Read The Stars", "Standing Still", and "When I'm Done".

Later in the Fall of 2008, Dapo also enjoyed credit for other records, including "Running" (co-written with James Fauntleroy and Midi Mafia) on David Archuleta's self-titled debut album (11 November 2008) – his first since becoming runner-up on American Idol in June 2008—and "Torn Down" (also co-written with James Fauntleroy and Midi Mafia) from Brandy's highly anticipated album, Human (9 December 2008), which she describes as her most personal album to date. In the Spring of 2009, Dapo received songwriter and producer credit for the tracks "Know Better", "Apart From Me", and "This Step Alone" on Fight for Love, the second album by American Idol Season 5 finalist Elliott Yamin, which was released on 5 May 2009. He also received credit for "Forever in You", which was included on the album as an iTunes and Japan bonus track.

Dapo is a Yamaha-endorsed artist. Dapo worked with two-time Grammy-winning producer Jeffrey Weber to record a song for Senator Barack Obama's presidential campaign called "Change". Dapo worked with American Idol winner and Grammy-nominated artist Jordin Sparks on her second album Battlefield on the track titled "No Parade". Dapo wrote and produced the track "No Parade" along with Oscar-nominated songwriting duo Scott Cutler and Anne Preven. "Listen", is sung by Beyoncé Knowles in the 2006 film Dreamgirls. Early reviews of the album have generally been positive with most critics highlighting individual tracks such as "No Parade", which is described as 'breaking your heart even before she gets to the bruising chorus.'. Dapo was announced as one of the songwriters for the hit Disney Channel Original Movie Camp Rock 2: The Final Jam along with Kara DioGuardi and others. (Dapo co-wrote, produced and mixed "Fire" performed by Matthew "Mdot" Finley.)

On 30 October 2009, Atlantic Records announced that Dapo will be one of the producers personally chosen by Grammy Award-winning R&B singer Toni Braxton to work on her highly anticipated label debut album (Pulse) to be released 2 February 2010.

Dapo co-wrote and produced the track "Bigger" (with co-writers Frank Ocean and Midi Mafia) on Canadian singer Justin Bieber's first part of his two-part debut studio album, My World, which was released on 17 November 2009, via Island Records. Ashante Infantry of Toronto Star called "Bigger" one of the best tracks on the album. On the week ending 5 December 2009, due to digital sales after the release of My World, "Bigger" debuted on the US Billboard Hot 100 and the Canadian Hot 100. The song debuted at number forty-nine on the Hot Digital Songs chart in the US, and therefore consecutively appeared at number ninety-four on the Hot 100.

The second part of the album, My World 2.0, on which Dapo co-wrote and produced the track "Overboard" (a duet featuring Jessica Jarrell), was released on 23 March 2010 and debuted at number one on the US Billboard 200. In less than one month of release, the first part of the album was certified Gold in the United States by the RIAA, and in less than two months (8 January 2010), it was certified Platinum in the United States, by the RIAA selling over one million copies.

Channeling his jazz roots, Dapo produced and recorded songs with Tony Award-winning singer/actress, Anika Noni Rose for Disney's album, The Princess and The Frog: Tiana and Her Princess Friends. The album is inspired by the 2009 Disney animated film The Princess and the Frog and was released on 24 November 2009. The album is the follow-up release in the successful Disney 'And Friends' musical series and features the song "Down in New Orleans" performed by Anika Noni Rose as written by Academy Award-winning composer Randy Newman and produced by Dapo Torimiro. In another Princess and the Frog-inspired album, Bayou Boogie (Release date 3/16/10), Dapo wrote and produced two songs: "Everyday Princess" and "Sing Away Your Blues", both performed by Anika Noni Rose (as Princess Tiana).

Dapo was a featured performer on stage with Andrea Bocelli and David Foster on the PBS Great Performances special, "Andrea Bocelli & David Foster: My Christmas." The special debuted on Thanksgiving night 2009 with additional broadcasts through the month of December.

== 2010 and 2011 ==
- Early 2010, Dapo wrote and recorded with David Archuleta, Charice, Oprah's Karaoke Challenge Winner, Abraham McDonald, Def Jam artist, Khalil, Guy Sebastian, Jesse McCartney, and Jacob Latimore.
- On 14 July 2010, Demi Lovato posted on her Twitter "With @dapotorimiro! This will be the first song I've recorded for my next record.... and we're starting off with a BIG bang!!!"
- Dapo can be heard rapping on the Ester Dean-penned, Jesse McCartney dance song, "Up". Dapo wrote and recorded the song exclusively for Jon Chu's Step Up 3D dance movie soundtrack, Step Up 3D Soundtrack. (27 July 2010) A remixed version of the song can also be heard in a rooftop dance scene in the movie.
- On 10 August 2010, the soundtrack for Camp Rock 2: The Final Jam – a 2010 Disney Channel Original Movie was released. The movie was 2010's No. 1 cable movie premiere with over 7.9 million viewers on its premiere night. "Fire" was the third single on the soundtrack. On 25 June, the song was released on Radio Disney during a Take Over with Meaghan Martin and Matthew "Mdot" Finley.
- On 28 September 2010, Justin Bieber's My World 2.0 was certified 2× Platinum by RIAA in the United States.
- Dapo broke into Japan's music market with Japan's mega-group, Arashi with the song, "Mada Ue o". The song appears on Arashi's ninth studio album, Boku no Miteiru Fūkei which debuted at number one, selling 731,000 copies in the first week and ended up being the best-selling album in Japan in 2010. Before the end of the year, Dapo also wrote a song for Sony Music Japan artist, Fukuhara Miho's Regrets of Love album (12/22/10). The song, "Regrets of Love" was written by Dapo, Fukuhara Miho, Damon Sharpe, and Drew Ryan Scott.
- Dapo played upright bass on Def Jam recording artist Chrisette Michele's "If Nobody Sang Along" on Let Freedom Reign (11/30/10). The album was produced by Chrisette Michele, L.A. Reid, Ne-Yo and Chuck Harmony. Dapo performed with his jazz band, "DMP", (on keys) in Hollywood on 12/8/10. On the final song, while Dapo played the melodica, Chuck Harmony sat in on keys.
- Concert footage of Justin Bieber performing "Bigger" and "Overboard" live at Madison Square Garden as part of his My World Tour, can be seen in the film Justin Bieber: Never Say Never (2/11/11). The live version of "Overboard", performed by Justin Bieber and Miley Cyrus at Madison Square Garden, is available on the Never Say Never: The Remixes CD (2011) – a musical companion piece to the movie.
- On 5 May 2011, Justin Bieber's Never Say Never – The Remixes was certified Platinum by RIAA in the United States.
- Dapo spent the end of 2011 in the studio with the singer/songwriter, Stacy Barthe (Rihanna, Brandy, Britney Spears, Kelly Rowland), writing for Barthe's debut album as well as for other artists. On 6 December, Dapo and Stacy released a 6-song holiday EP, "Stacy Barthe Presents: The Seven Days of Christmas", all instrumentation by Dapo. The EP features two duets: one, with Stacy and John Legend ("Baby It's Cold Outside") and the second, a duet with Stacy and Dapo ("Sleigh Ride"). Dapo posted pictures from the EP Listening Party at his studio on his website which included Ethiopia Habtemariam (executive VP/head of urban music for Universal Music Publishing Group & senior VP of Motown), nine-time Grammy-winner, John Legend, and producer, Hit-Boy (Jay-Z, Kanye West "Niggas in Paris").
- December 2011 also marked the beginning of what will become a yearly project for Dapo, "Dapo & Friends Christmas | Volume One". The music project will be an annual production by Dapo, featuring Dapo and his singer/songwriter friends revisiting popular Christmas songs, with a cd and a local live performance, raising money for charity. "Dapo & Friends Christmas | Volume One" includes a duet with Dapo and American Idol, Season 7 Runner-up, David Archuleta ("Drummer Boy"), as well as songs performed by Scotty Granger, Nikki Flores, TC, Oprah's Karaoke Challenge Winner, Abraham McDonald, Nickelodeon series How To Rock star, Max Schneider, Gaby Ramirez, Ginny Blackmore, Stacy Barthe, and bassist, Robert "Bubby" Lewis.

== 2012 to present ==
In January 2012, Dapo posted a picture on his website from the studio working with Keke Palmer and Scotty Granger. On 7 February 2012, Stacy Barthe released her third EP, IN THE IN-BETWEEN. The nine-song EP features four songs co-written & produced by Dapo. The Sade-esque, "Easier Said Than Done", jumped out as an early fan favourite. Other Dapo-produced tracks includes "Do Me" featuring Dapo on guitar and piano, "Just My Luck" showcasing Dapo's acoustic guitar playing and a new addition to Dapo's productions, the melodica; and finally, the reggae-infused, "When I'm Gone". For the majority of February, Dapo was on tour with Barthe as her musical director, guitar player, and background vocalist, as part of the BET Music Matters / Estelle All of Me Tour, along with Luke James & Elle Varner, which included shows in Los Angeles (Key Club), San Diego, Oakland, Dallas, Houston, Austin, Birmingham, Atlanta, Washington D.C., Boston, Baltimore, and NYC (Irving Plaza) for Estelle's All of Me album release.

Mid-2012 releases included, "Yes I Am", Demi Lovato (Dapo/Priscilla Renea), on the Japanese Deluxe Edition of Unbroken (April 2012) and "Make A Joyful Noise" in the Disney Channel Original Movie, Let It Shine, scheduled for a June 2012 air date on The Disney Channel.

The end of 2012 releases included a song Dapo co-wrote, "Always Be Together", with Ester Dean for X-FACTOR UK Winners, Little Mix and their debut album, DNA. Dapo also co-wrote "I'm A Diamond" with Priscilla Renea for Girls' Generation released on their Girls' Generation II: Girls & Peace album.

== Select discography ==
- 2008 "Quickly" (featuring Brandy) Evolver, John Legend composer, Instrumentation, producer, Programming
- 2008 "Torn Down" Human, Brandy composer, Instrumentation, producer, Programming
- 2008 "Running" David Archuleta, David Archuleta composer, Instrumentation, producer, Programming
- 2009 "Know Better" Fight for Love, Elliott Yamin composer, Instrumentation, producer, Programming
- 2009 "Apart From Me" Fight for Love, Elliott Yamin composer, Instrumentation, producer, Programming
- 2009 "This Step Alone" Fight for Love, Elliott Yamin composer, Instrumentation, producer, Programming
- 2009 "Forever in You" (iTunes and Japan bonus track) Fight for Love, Elliott Yamin composer, Instrumentation, producer, Programming
- 2009 "No Parade" Battlefield, Jordin Sparks composer, Instrumentation, producer, Vocal Production, Programming
- '2009 '"Bigger" My World, Justin Bieber composer, Instrumentation, producer, Programming
- 2009 "Down in New Orleans" The Princess and the Frog: Tiana and Her Princess Friends, Anika Noni Rose Instrumentation, producer, Vocal Production, Programming
- 2009 "Hope Is Always Here" Olivia Newton-John, David Foster and the kids from Purple Songs Can Fly Project composer, Instrumentation, producer, Programming
- 2009 "Everyday Princess" Bayou Boogie: Inspired By The Princess & The Frog, Anika Noni Rose composer, Instrumentation, producer, Vocal Production, Programming
- 2009 "Sing Away Your Blues" Bayou Boogie: Inspired By The Princess & The Frog, Anika Noni Rose composer, Instrumentation, producer, Vocal Production, Programming
- 2010 "Overboard" (featuring Jessica Jarrell) My World 2.0, Justin Bieber composer, Instrumentation, producer, Programming
- 2010 "Woman" Pulse, Toni Braxton Instrumentation, producer, Programming
- 2010 "Fire" Camp Rock 2: The Final Jam, Matthew "Mdot" Finley composer, Instrumentation, producer, Vocal Production, Background Vocals, Programming, Mixer
- 2010 "Up!" (featuring Dapo) Step Up 3D Soundtrack, Jesse McCartney composer, Instrumentation, producer, Vocal Production, Rapper, Programming
- 2010 "If Nobody Sang Along" (bass) Let Freedom Reign, Chrisette Michele Upright Bass
- 2010 "Mada Ue o" Boku no Miteiru Fūkei Arashi composer, Instrumentation, producer, Programming
- 2010 "Regrets of Love" Miho Fukuhara composer, Instrumentation, producer, Programming
- 2011 "Bigger" (LIVE VERSION: Justin Bieber) Never Say Never composer, Instrumentation, producer, Programming
- 2011 "Overboard" (LIVE VERSION: Justin Bieber duet with Miley Cyrus) Never Say Never musical companion piece, Never Say Never: The Remixes cd composer, Instrumentation, producer, Programming
- 2011 "We Right Here" Shake It Up: Break It Down Disney Channel Soundtrack composer, Instrumentation, producer, Programming
- 2011 "All I Really Want For Christmas" Stacy Barthe Presents The Seven Days of Christmas, Stacy Barthe composer, Instrumentation, producer, Vocal Production, Programming
- 2011 "All I Really Want For Christmas (Is You)" Dapo & Friends Christmas | Volume One Scotty Granger composer, Instrumentation, producer, Vocal Production, Programming
- 2012 "Easier Said Than Done" In The Inbetween (EP) Stacy Barthe composer, Instrumentation, producer, Vocal Production, Programming
- 2012 "Just My Luck" In The Inbetween (EP) Stacy Barthe composer, Instrumentation, producer, Vocal Production, Programming
- 2012 "Do Me" In The Inbetween (EP) Stacy Barthe composer, Instrumentation, producer, Vocal Production, Programming
- 2012 "When I'm Gone" In The Inbetween (EP) Stacy Barthe composer, Instrumentation, producer, Vocal Production, Programming
- 2012 "Yes I Am" Unbroken (Japan Deluxe Edition) Demi Lovato composer, Instrumentation, producer, Vocal Production, Programming
- 2012 "Yes I Am" Give Your Heart A Break International Digital EP Demi Lovato composer, Instrumentation, producer, Vocal Production, Programming
- 2012 "Make A Joyful Noise" Let It Shine, a Disney Channel Original Movie composer, Instrumentation, Producer, Programming, Vocal Production, Background Vocals
- 2012 "Always Be Together" DNA, Little Mix composer, instrumentation, drum programming, keys, producer, Mixer
- 2012 "I'm A Diamond" Girls' Generation II: Girls & Peace, Girls' Generation composer, Instrumentation, Producer, Programming, Mixer
- 2014 "Teach Me Tonight" (originally performed by Dinah Washington) Aretha Franklin Sings the Great Diva Classics, Aretha Franklin Instrumentation, Programming, Produced by Clive Davis, Kenny "Babyface" Edmonds" and Dapo Torimiro
- 2014 "1996" Chapter One (Ella Henderson Album), Ella Henderson instrumentation, guitar, bass, drums, keyboard, producer, Programming
- 2016 "Hell No" ALBUM: Rita Wilson, Rita Wilson Instrumentation, Programming, Strings, Produced by Babyface and Dapo Torimiro
- 2017 "Stand by Me" (writer Ben E. King) Songs of Cinema, Michael Bolton instrumentation, bass, guitar, piano, drums, Hammond B3, programming, produced by Dapo Torimiro
- 2017 "As Time Goes By" (writer Herman Hupfeld) Songs of Cinema, Michael Bolton instrumentation, piano, drums, upright bass, strings, Produced by Dapo Torimiro
- 2018 "My Heart" Sex & Cigarettes, Toni Braxton feat. Colbie Caillat composer, instrumentation, piano, strings, programming, Produced by Babyface and Dapo Torimiro
- 2018 "FOH" Sex & Cigarettes, Toni Braxton composer, instrumentation, piano, programming, Produced by Babyface and Dapo Torimiro

== Soundtracks (TV and film) ==
- Christmas at Water's Edge (2004) (TV) (writer: "Christmas At Water's Edge" Theme, "But Most of All", "Where Angels Fly", "It's All About Peace", "Still Dreaming", "So Real")
- Made in Hollywood Theme song (48 episodes, 2005–2007)
- Made in Hollywood: Teen Edition Theme song (2006) TV series
- Spin (Movie) (2007) Score & Soundtrack
- "Fire" Matthew "Mdot" Finley Camp Rock 2: The Final Jam, Matthew "Mdot" Finley (2010)
- "Up!" Jesse McCartney (Featuring Dapo) Step Up 3D Soundtrack, Jesse McCartney (2010)
- "We Right Here" Shake It Up (Disney Channel TV series) (2010) Meatball episode
- "Overboard" Justin Bieber live duet with Miley Cyrus Never Say Never (2011)
- "Bigger" Justin Bieber Never Say Never (2011)
- "Make A Joyful Noise" Let It Shine, a Disney Channel Original Movie (2012)

== TV and film performances ==
- Bishop T.D. Jakes Live performance, CNN "Dedication of the Potter's House" (music director, Keyboards)
- Rhian Benson Live performance, KOCE-TV/PBS's "Sound Affects" (Keyboards, Guitars, Background Vocals)
- Tavis Smiley Show Live performance, piano accompaniment to Oscar Brown Jr., "People of Soul" (Piano)
- David Foster & Andrea Bocelli's My Christmas, PBS Great Performances (Air date from 1 December 2009) Live performance, featured guitar player, "O' Tannenbaum" (Andrea Bocelli) and "What Child Is This" (Andrea Bocelli & Mary J. Blige) (Guitar)
- Takers (Release date: 20 August 2010) Featured piano player (Piano)
- La La Land (2016) Featured role and Guitar Consultant for John Legend

== Touring ==
- Stacy Barthe – BET Music Matters / Estelle All of Me Tour (music director, Guitar, Background Vocals)
- Lauryn Hill – National Tour (Keyboards, Background Vocals)
- Lalah Hathaway – Berklee College of Music, Boston, MA (Keyboards)
- Lalah Hathaway/Marcus Miller – National Tour (Keyboards)
- Stevie Wonder – Century Club, Los Angeles, CA (Keyboards)
- Impromptu/Earth, Wind & Fire – National Tour (Keyboards)
- Mike Phillips – Live performance, Los Angeles, CA (Keyboards)
- Rhian Benson/Anthony Hamilton/Calvin Richardson – El Rey Theatre, Los Angeles, CA (Keyboards, Guitars, Background Vocals)
- Rhian Benson/Javier – SOB, NYC (Keyboards, Guitars, Background Vocals)
- Rhian Benson/Musiq Soulchild – House of Blues Orlando, FL (Keyboards, Guitars, Background Vocals)
- Rhian Benson/Raphael Saadiq/Angie Stone – House of Blues Las Vegas (Keyboards, Guitars, Background Vocals)
- Rhian Benson/Raphael Saadiq/Angie Stone – House of Blues Los Angeles (Keyboards, Guitars, Background Vocals)
- Rhian Benson/Floetry – Belly Up Tavern, San Diego, CA (Keyboards, Guitars, Background Vocals)
- Rhian Benson/Michael Franks – Lincoln Center, Washington, D.C. (Keyboards, Guitars, Background Vocals)
- Rhian Benson/Brian McKnight – National Tour (Keyboards, Guitars, Background Vocals)
- Rhian Benson/Brian McKnight – Hollywood Bowl, Hollywood, CA (Keyboards, Guitars, Background Vocals)
- Rhian Benson (Live Studio Performance) – Sirius Satellite Radio, New York City (Keyboards, Guitars, Background Vocals)
- Jane Zhang – Pasadena Bowl, Pasadena, CA (Keyboards)
- Rhian Benson/Calvin Richardson – Cool Nu Jazz Festival, Detroit, MI (Keyboards, Guitars, Background Vocals)

== Awards and nominations ==
- 2009: Nigeria Entertainment Award – International Producer of the Year (June 2009)
