= What Christmas Means =

Studio album by Kem
- Released: October 16, 2012
- Genre: R&B
- Length: 42:07
- Label: Motown

Kem chronology
Intimacy: Album III (2010)	What Christmas Means (2012)	Promise to Love (2014)

What Christmas Means is the fourth studio album by American singer Kem. It was released by Motown Records on October 16, 2012 in the United States. His first Christmas album, the album features traditional Christmas songs, along with original material. Guests on the album features Ledisi and the Detroit Gospel Choir. What Christmas Means peaked at number 64 on the US Billboard 200 and number six on the US Top Holiday Albums. A deluxe edition with four additional bonus tracks was issued on October 29, 2013.

== Critical reception ==
Professional ratings
Review scores
Source	Rating
Allmusic	3.5/5 stars

Andy Kellman, writing for Allmusic, wrote that "Kem followers probably know to approach What Christmas Means without the expectation of hearing a thunderous version of "Little Drummer Boy" or collaborations with the Trans-Siberian Orchestra. Sure enough, the singer and songwriter's first Christmas album is filled with the same relaxed, romantic, spiritual, and gently uplifting moods of his studio albums. He didn't make this on autopilot, either [...] Kem fans who celebrate Christmas will likely value this disc as a seasonal staple for years to come."

== Track listing ==
No.	Title	Writer(s)	Length
1.	"Glorify the King"	Kem; Melanie Rutherford; Troi Owens	3:28
2.	"What Christmas Means"	Kem; Rutherford	5:48
3.	"A Christmas Song for You"	Kem; Rutherford	5:49
4.	"Have Yourself a Merry Little Christmas"	Ralph Blane; Hugh Martin	4:10
5.	"Christmas Time Is Here"	Vince Guaraldi; Lee Mendelson	4:13
6.	"The Christmas Song"	Mel Tormé; Bob Wells	4:13
7.	"Be Mine for Christmas" (featuring Ledisi)	Kenny Gamble; Cary Gilbert; Leon Huff; Kem; Rutherford	4:17
8.	"Merry Christmas Baby"	Lou Baxter; Johnny Moore	2:46
9.	"We Three Kings"	John Henry Hopkins Jr.	4:35
10.	"Do Wop Christmas (That's What Christmas Is About)"	Kem; Rutherford	2:48

Deluxe edition bonus tracks
No.	Title	Writer(s)	Length
11.	"Jesus" (featuring Patti LaBelle & Ronald Isley)	Kem; Rutherford	4:45
12.	"Bethlehem"	Kem; Randy Bowland	4:34
13.	"Home for Christmas"	Kem	4:15
14.	"Lullaby Noel"	Kem	3:01

Sample credits

- "Be Mine for Christmas" contains elements of "Me and Mrs. Jones" (1972) as performed by Billy Paul.

== Charts ==
=== Weekly charts ===
Chart (2012)	Peak position
US Billboard 200	64
US Top Holiday Albums (Billboard)	6
US Top R&B/Hip-Hop Albums (Billboard)	9

=== Year-end charts ===
Chart (2013)	Position
US Top R&B/Hip-Hop Albums (Billboard)	72

== Release history ==
Region	Date	Edition	Format(s)	Label	Ref.
Various	October 16, 2012	Standard	CD; digital download	Motown	
Various	October 29, 2013	Deluxe	CD; digital download	Motown	
