= Kemistry (album) =

Studio album by Kem
- Released: February 25, 2003
- Genre: Jazz; R&B
- Length: 47:50
- Label: Motown
- Producer: Kem

Kem chronology
Kemistry (2003)	Album II (2005)

Professional ratings
Review scores
Source	Rating
Allmusic	3/5 stars

Kemistry is the debut studio album by American singer Kem. It was released by Motown Records on February 25, 2003 in the United States. The album peaked at number 90 on the US Billboard 200 and was certified gold by the Recording Industry Association of America (RIAA) 16 months after its release with an excess of 500,000 copies sold. The song "Love Calls" was released as a single and reached number 25 on the US Hot R&B/Hip-Hop Songs.

== Track listing ==
All songs written and produced by Kem.

No.	Title	Length
1.	"Matter of Time"	4:41
2.	"Miss You"	4:27
3.	"Say"	5:54
4.	"Inside"	4:49
5.	"I'm Missin' Your Love"	4:15
6.	"Love Calls"	5:13
7.	"Brotha Man"	3:59
8.	"Cherish This Moment"	4:13
9.	"This Place (Dedicated to the Church of Today)"	4:08
10.	"You Are"	5:51

== Personnel ==
Musicians

- Kem: Vocals, Keyboards
- Fred "Rodriguez" Robinson: Bass
- Rayse Biggs: Trumpet
- Edward Gooch: Trumpet
- David McMurray: Tenor sax
- Marlon "Wild Bill" Curry: Percussion
- Andre "Zapp" Driscoll: Drums

Production

- Executive Producer: Kem, Shante Paige
- Arranged & Produced By Kem
- Engineer: Chris Johnson
- Mastering: Chris Athens
- Mastering: Jonas Dainius Berzanskis

== Charts ==
=== Weekly charts ===
Chart (2003)	Peak position
US Billboard 200	90
US Top R&B/Hip-Hop Albums (Billboard)	14

=== Year-end charts ===
Chart (2003)	Position
US Top R&B/Hip-Hop Albums (Billboard)	48
Chart (2004)	Position
US Top R&B/Hip-Hop Albums (Billboard)	57

== Certifications ==
Region	Certification	Certified units/sales
United States (RIAA)	Gold	500,000^{^}
^{^} Shipments figures based on certification alone.
