= As Long as I Live Tour =

2019 concert tour by Toni Braxton

- Tour by Toni Braxton
- Associated album: Sex & Cigarettes
- Start date: January 19, 2019
- End date: November 19, 2019
- Legs: 3
- No. of shows: 21 in North America; 2 in Africa; 1 in Europe; 24 total

Toni Braxton concert chronology
- The Hits Tour (2016); As Long as I Live World Tour (2019); Love & Laughter (2024-2025)

The As Long as I Live Tour was the fifth concert tour by American R&B/pop singer Toni Braxton in support of her eighth studio album, Sex & Cigarettes. The tour kicked off on January 19, 2019, in Columbia, South Carolina and ended on November 19 in London, U.K. The tour also included female R&B group SWV and singer Babyface as featured special guests in selected Northern America dates.

== Background ==
On September 14, 2017, Braxton released the lead buzz single "Deadwood" from her new album, Sex & Cigarettes. The single reached no. 7 on Billboard Adult R&B Songs chart. A remix EP for the song "Coping" was released in November 2017. The single reached no. 1 on the Billboard Dance Charts, earning Braxton's 6th single to reach #1 on that chart. This was followed by the smash hit single "Long as I Live" which created number one on the Billboard R&B Songs chart. The album and the latter single was nominated for a combined 3 2019 Grammy Awards and the single "Long as I Live" was awarded, Most Outstanding Song in the 2019 NAACAP Awards.

Following the album's three hit singles, Toni Braxton announced in October 2018 she would kick-off her As Long as I Live World Tour in 2019 with R&B female group SWV and singer Babyface as the featured special guests joining her during the North American leg of her tour. Toni Braxton merchandise purchased from the singer's official website allowed for early access to tickets for the tour. On October 26, general ticket sales were officially available for purchases via LiveNation online. In August 2019, tickets went on sale for the two city leg of her tour in South Africa. Followed by the London, U.K. concert going on sale in September 2019, with pre-sale tickets available via the venue, Event Apollo's website; with general sale for the London show going live on September 6.

== Opening acts ==
- SWV (Northern America, selected dates)
- Babyface (North America, selected dates)
- Shekhinah (South Africa)
- DJ Hudson (South Africa)

== Set list ==
1. "He Wasn't Man Enough"
2. "How Many Ways"
3. "Seven Whole Days"
4. "You're Makin' Me High"
5. "Just Be a Man About It"
6. "Love Shoulda Brought You Home"
7. "I Heart You"
8. "You Mean the World to Me"
9. "Deadwood"
10. "Sex & Cigarettes" / "FOH"
11. "My Heart"^{1}
12. "Another Sad Love Song"
13. "Breathe Again"
14. "I Love Me Some Him"
15. "Un-Break My Heart"
16. "Long as I Live"

^{1} performed at selected dates in North America

=== Additional notes ===
- February 8, show at the Prudential Center, Babyface and Toni performed "A Rose Still A Rose."
- March 3, show at Microsoft Theater included Toni and Babyface performing their hit duet single "Give U My Heart."

== Shows ==
Date	City	Country	Venue
North America
January 19, 2019	Columbia	United States	Columbia Township Auditorium
January 20, 2019	Birmingham	United States	Boutwell Auditorium
January 23, 2019	Atlanta	United States	Fox Theatre
January 25, 2019	Tulsa	United States	Margaritaville
January 26, 2019	Irving	United States	Toyota Music Factory
January 27, 2019	Sugar Land	United States	Smart Financial Centre
January 29, 2019	Hollywood	United States	Hard Rock Event Center
January 31, 2019	Durham	United States	Durham Performing Arts Center
February 1, 2019	Oxon Hill	United States	The Theater at MGM National Harbor
February 2, 2019	Mashantucket	United States	Foxwoods Grand Theater
February 5, 2019	Nashville	United States	Nashville Municipal Auditorium
February 7, 2019	Brooklyn	United States	Kings Theatre
February 8, 2019	Newark	United States	Prudential Center
February 14, 2019	Detroit	United States	Fox Theatre
February 15, 2019	Chicago	United States	Arie Crown Theater
February 17, 2019	Atlantic City	United States	Borgata Events Center
February 21, 2019	Chandler	United States	Wild Horse Pass Casino
February 23, 2019	Reno	United States	Grand Theatre
February 24, 2019	Oakland	United States	Paramount Theatre
March 1, 2019	Rancho Mirage	United States	Agua Caliente
March 3, 2019	Los Angeles	United States	Microsoft Theater
Africa
November 9, 2019	Johannesburg	South Africa	Ticketpro Dome
November 12, 2019	Cape Town	South Africa	Grand Arena
Europe
November 16, 2019	London	United Kingdom	Eventim Apollo

== Cancelled and rescheduled shows ==
February 9, 2019	Atlantic City, NJ	Borgata Events Center	Rescheduled for February 17, 2019
February 18, 2019	Montreal, Canada	Bell Centre	Cancelled due to Grammy Awards ceremony.
