= Sex & Cigarettes =

Studio album by Toni Braxton
- Released: March 23, 2018
- Studio: Eastcote Studios (London, UK); Brandon's Way Recording Studios (Los Angeles, California); Abbey Road Studios (London, UK); Triangle Sound Studios (Atlanta, Georgia); Scotch Corner Studios (Burbank, California)
- Length: 30:50
- Label: Def Jam
- Producer: Toni Braxton; Fred Ball; Antonio Dixon; Kenny "Babyface" Edmonds; Dapo Torimiro; Stuart Crichton; Tricky Stewart; Pierre Medor

Toni Braxton chronology
Braxton Family Christmas (2015)	Sex & Cigarettes (2018)	Spell My Name (2020)

Singles from Sex & Cigarettes
- 1. "Deadwood" Released: September 15, 2017; 2. "Long as I Live" Released: February 9, 2018; 3. "FOH" Released: October 3, 2018

Sex & Cigarettes is the ninth studio album by American singer Toni Braxton. It was released on March 23, 2018, by Def Jam Recordings. Her first solo album in eight years, it served as her debut for the label after signing a new record deal. Braxton worked with a variety of producers on the album, including Fred Ball, Antonio Dixon, Kenny "Babyface" Edmonds, Dapo Torimiro, Stuart Crichton, Tricky Stewart, and Pierre Medor. Its release was preceded by the release of two singles, "Deadwood" and "Long as I Live" as well as a remix EP of the song "Coping" which features on the album.

The album received mainly positive reviews from music critics and debuted and peaked at number 22 on the US Billboard 200. It was nominated for three Grammy Awards, including Best R&B Album at the 61st awards ceremony. In promotion of Sex & Cigarettes, Braxton launched her As Long As I Live Tour which began in January 2019 in Northern America, visiting 21 cities, and concluded in United Kingdom in November 2019. It was Braxton's first album to be issued with a Parental Advisory warning, and an edited version was also made available.

== Background and recording ==
Braxton began recording the album in 2016. In contrast to the fast recording of her previous albums, Braxton acknowledged that it took her a second to find her way to the title Sex and Cigarettes. Following her divorce from musician Keri Lewis in 2013, she was still going through a period of self-reflection, and while Braxton felt great about herself, she decided to write her experiences down, looking for an outlet for her emotions. Encouraged by friend and frequent collaborator Babyface who suggested to her to start telling her story, Braxton conceived an album about infidelity, telling Interview magazine: "I found out about that stuff the hard way, and it left me stronger [...] So this is about love and love gone wrong and trying to fix it and demanding that you make things better and having respect for yourself and demanding to be respected, but at the same time being vulnerable and knowing that love can make you do silly things and it’s okay to be silly."

Soundwise, Braxton was looking for an organic approach during the conceptualization of the album. In the same article with Interview she remarked: "On this album, I said, I’m just gonna let it be organic and let it be indicative of who I am, have fun and be creative. I didn’t want to put myself in a box this time. I’ve been doing this type of music for a long time and I didn’t want it to sound dated." While she reteamed with Babyface and regular producers Daryl Simmons, Antonio Dixon, and Dapo Torimiro, Braxton also consulted several new collaborators to work with her on the album, including Fred Ball, Stuart Crichton, Pierre Medor, and Tricky Stewart. In 2018, she told Us Magazine: “Sex and Cigarettes [is] the next step. I go back to my original work and listen to those songs [...] I’m always pushing the envelope for sexy and for my sound. I think as an artist you have push the envelope even further and that’s what I think I did with this album.”

== Promotion ==
On August 28, 2017, Braxton revealed via her social media she had shot the first music video "Deadwood" for her upcoming album, stating: "Had so much fun shooting @thunderstudios with my BFF @billewoodruff". On September 5, 2017, in an interview with The Insider, Braxton confirmed the title, Sex & Cigarettes, stating: "I feel like I'm older, I wanna say what I feel. I don't wanna be censored". To promote the album, Braxton held a private album listening session in London and also appeared on the daytime show Loose Women to promote the album and the single "Long as I Live". On March 9, 2018, Braxton announced the album was available for pre-order, revealing its cover and track listing of eight songs.

=== Singles ===
"Deadwood" was released as the lead single on September 15, 2017. The audio video was released to Braxton's Vevo account on September 13, 2017. The music video was released on Braxton's Vevo account October 6, 2017. On December 2, 2017, the song peaked at number thirty-four on the Billboard R&B/Hip-Hop Airplay chart and spent a total of seventeen weeks on the chart. On December 9, 2017, the song peaked at number seven on the Billboard Adult R&B Songs chart and spent a total of twenty-one weeks on the chart. A remix EP of "Coping" featuring five remixes of the song was released on November 10, 2017. On February 10, 2018, the song reached number one on the Billboard Dance Club Songs chart and has currently spent a total of sixteen weeks on the chart and two weeks at number one.

"Long as I Live" was released as the second single on February 9, 2018. The audio video was released on Vevo on February 8, 2018. It reached no. 1 on US Adult R&B Songs (Billboard) and is the most successful single from this album. In October 2018, "FOH" was announced as the third single from the album. It was serviced to Urban/UAC stations with an edited version.

== Critical reception ==
Professional ratings
Aggregate scores
Source	Rating
Metacritic	74/100
Review scores
Source	Rating
AllMusic	3.5/5 stars
Exclaim!	7/10 stars
The Guardian	4/5 stars
Knoxville News Sentinel	4/5 stars
Pitchfork	6.8/10

Sex & Cigarettes received mainly positive reviews from music critics. At Metacritic, which assigns a normalized rating out of 100 to reviews from mainstream critics, the album received an average score of 73, which indicates "generally favorable reviews", based on 6 reviews. Ben Beaumont-Thomas of The Guardian gave the album four out of five stars. He wrote that "Braxton may have just got engaged to hip-hop mogul Birdman, but there isn’t any sign of a heel-clicking, lamppost-swinging flush of love here — she seems permanently marooned in a Mariana Trench of post-breakup misery [...] Like Billie Holiday, Braxton’s voice reflexively bends towards sadness, and it continues to do so even when there’s a diamond on her finger." Beaumont-Thomas noted that "a very strong trio of songs open this record" and summed the album as a whole as "exquisitely anguished R&B."

In a positive review, Matt Bauer of Exclaim! wrote that "like Mary J. Blige, pain and heartbreak are inescapably right in Braxton's wheelhouse. So it is with Sex & Cigarettes [...] while not a classic, [the album] is a solid effort from R&B's true queen of heartbreak." AllMusic writer Andy Kellman rated the album three and a half out of five stars and wrote that "the productions, typically polished for a Braxton album, are subtly diverse," ranging from "contemporary country [to] classic Southern soul [and] tropical pop." He found that Braxton delivered "with her distinctive mix of fire and finesse [but] his has more of the former element than any previous Braxton release." Los Angeles Times' Mikael Wood gave the album a positive review, stating: "Even in her excitement, though, Braxton's singing — low and smoky, with just the right rawness around the edges — suggests she can sense trouble on the horizon."

Pitchfork editor Claire Lobenfeld concluded that Braxton "is still innately part of R&B’s fabric, even now that her heyday has passed." Songs such as “FOH” are "not a powerhouse single like “He Wasn't Man Enough,” but it’s confirmation that no matter which way pop’s tides turn, Braxton has a way to find her own voice and make it work." Chuck Campbell from The Knoxville News Sentinel called Sex & Cigarettes a "predictable [...] but absolutely satisfying" album, while L. Michael Gipson from SoulTracks noted that the album was "sonically pleasing" but a "lyrical disappointment." Rich Juzwiak, writing for Spin, found that "Braxton’s tunes here rarely warrant her gusto, and the coupling of virtuoso performances with rather mediocre material squares with Sex & Cigarettes's larger theme of the dissatisfaction that results from pouring one’s heart into an undeserving relationship. It’s a depressing album, but not quite in the way that’s intended."

=== Accolades ===
The album was nominated for three Grammy Awards: Best R&B Performance and Best R&B Song for "Long as I Live", and for Best R&B Album at the 61st Annual Grammy Awards. Braxton won the Outstanding Song – Traditional for "Long as I Live" at the 50th NAACP Image Awards.

== Commercial performance ==
The album debuted at number 22 on the US Billboard 200 and number 14 on the Top R&B/Hip-Hop Albums chart with 16,000 album equivalent units. The album debuted at number 33 on the UK Albums Chart and number one on the UK R&B Albums Chart.

== Track listing ==
Sex & Cigarettes track listing
No.	Title	Writer(s)	Producer(s)	Length
1.	"Deadwood"	Toni Braxton; Kwame Ogoo; Royce Doherty; Fred Ball	Braxton; Paul Boutin; Ball	3:59
2.	"Sex & Cigarettes"	Antonio Dixon; Braxton; Patrick "J. Que" Smith; Khristopher Riddick-Tynes; Kevin E. Ross	Dixon; Braxton^{[a]}; Boutin^{[a]}	3:46
3.	"Long as I Live"	Braxton; Dixon; Boutin	Dixon; Braxton^{[a]}; Boutin^{[a]}	4:50
4.	"FOH"	Braxton; Daryl Simmons; Dapo Torimiro; Kenny "Babyface" Edmonds; Kameron Glasper	Torimiro; Edmonds; Braxton^{[a]}; Boutin^{[a]}	2:47
5.	"Sorry"	Braxton; Ogoo; Doherty; Ball	Ball; Braxton^{[a]}; Boutin^{[a]}	3:56
6.	"My Heart" (featuring Colbie Caillat)	Braxton; Torimiro; Colbie Caillat; Edmonds; Glasper	Torimiro; Edmonds; Braxton^{[a]}; Boutin^{[a]}	4:08
7.	"Coping"	Braxton; Dave Gibson; Stuart Crichton; James Newman	Crichton; Braxton^{[a]}; Boutin^{[a]}	3:54
8.	"Missin'"	Christopher "Tricky" Stewart; Jeremiah Bethea; Pierre Medor	Medor; C. "Tricky" Stewart	3:30
Total length:				30:50

Target bonus tracks
No.	Title	Writer(s)	Producer(s)	Length
9.	"Forgiven" (from the movie The Forgiven)	Braxton	Braxton; Boutin	4:01
10.	"Coping" (Disco Killerz Remix)	Braxton; Gibson; Crichton; Newman	Crichton; Braxton^{[a]}; Boutin^{[a]}; Disco Killerz^{[b]}	3:30
11.	"Coping" (Eden Prince Remix)	Braxton; Gibson; Crichton; Newman	Crichton; Braxton^{[a]}; Boutin^{[a]}; Eden Prince^{[b]}	3:10

Notes

- ^a signifies a vocal producer
- ^b signifies an additional producer

== Personnel ==
=== Musicians ===
- Toni Braxton – primary artist, vocals (all tracks)
- Colbie Caillat – featured vocals (track 6)
- Kwame Ogoo – backing vocals, guitar (tracks 1, 5)
- Cynthia Harrell – background vocals (track 8)
- Ben Epstein – bass (tracks 1, 5)
- Earl Harvin – drums (tracks 1, 5)
- Fred Ball – keyboards, percussion (tracks 1, 5)
- Paul Boutin – additional percussion (tracks 1, 5), percussion (tracks 3, 4, 6)
- Clarissa Farran – string arrangement (tracks 1, 5)
- Hilary Skewes – string players contracting (tracks 1, 5)
- Antonio Dixon – all keyboard programming (track 2), drums (track 3), keyboards (track 3)
- Gary K. Thomas – string playing and arranging (track 2)
- Walter Barnes – bass (track 3)
- Eric Walls – electric guitar (track 3)
- Dapo Torimiro – keyboards (tracks 4, 6)
- Kenny "Babyface" Edmonds – acoustic guitars (tracks 4, 6), keyboards (track 6)
- Michael O'Neill – acoustic guitar solo (track 6)
- Michael Ripoll – additional guitars (track 6)
- Pierre Medor – keyboards, drum programming (track 8)
- C. "Tricky" Stewart – keyboards, drum programming (track 8)

=== Technical ===
- Steve Fitzmaurice – recording (tracks 1, 5)
- Jonathan Allen – strings recording (tracks 1, 5)
- Toni Braxton – vocal recording (track 7)
- Paul Boutin – vocal recording (track 7), engineering (tracks 2–4, 6), vocals engineering (tracks 1, 5), percussion engineering (track 5), mixing (tracks 1–7)
- Stuart Crichton – recording (track 7)
- Sam Thomas – recording (track 8)
- William Lovely – recording (track 8)
- Preston Reid – assistant engineer (track 8)
- Jaycen Joshua – mixing(track 8)
- Dave Nakaji – mix assisting (track 8)
- Ben Milchev – mix assisting (track 8)

== Charts ==
Chart performance for Sex & Cigarettes
Chart (2018)	Peak position
Belgian Albums (Ultratop Wallonia)	189
Dutch Albums (Album Top 100)	170
Greek Albums (IFPI)	70
Scottish Albums (OCC)	46
Spanish Albums (PROMUSICAE)	71
South African Albums (RISA)	6
UK Albums (OCC)	33
UK R&B Albums (OCC)	1
US Billboard 200	22
US Top R&B/Hip-Hop Albums (Billboard)	14

== Release history ==
Sex & Cigarettes release history
Region	Date	Format(s)	Label	Ref
Worldwide	March 23, 2018	Digital download; CD	Def Jam	
