= Promise to Love =

Studio album by Kem
- Released: August 25, 2014
- Genre: R&B
- Length: 46:34
- Label: Motown

Kem chronology
What Christmas Means (2012)	Promise to Love (2014)	Love Always Wins (2020)

Promise to Love is the fifth studio album by American singer Kem. It was released by Motown Records on August 25, 2014. The album debuted and peaked at number three on the US Billboard 200.

== Critical reception ==
Professional ratings
Review scores
Source	Rating
Allmusic	3/5 stars

Andy Kellman, writing for Allmusic, found that "as with the three albums that preceded it, Promise to Love consists almost entirely of smooth and quiet ballads that regard long-term devotion and self-improvement. [Kem] remains an antidote to prevailing contemporary R&B sounds. When he sings of going downtown, he means geographically, not anatomically – and guest Snoop Dogg, on his best behavior, displays restraint. [...] Kem might do one thing, but he does that one thing very well. Four- and five-year waits aside, the man knows how to please his listeners."

== Track listing ==
No.	Title	Length
1.	"Saving My Love for You"	2:50
2.	"Promise to Love"	4:09
3.	"Downtown" (featuring Snoop Dogg)	3:48
4.	"Beautiful World"	4:50
5.	"Do What You Gotta Do"	4:58
6.	"Say Something Real"	4:44
7.	"My Favorite Thing" (featuring Ronald Isley)	3:44
8.	"It's You"	5:22
9.	"The Soft Side of Love"	4:41
10.	"Nobody"	4:32
11.	"Pray For Me"	2:51

Deluxe edition
No.	Title	Length
12.	"Moments"	4:15
13.	"Don't Say Goodbye" (performed by L'Renee)	4:12

Target deluxe edition bonus tracks
No.	Title	Length
14.	"I Believe in Your Love"	3:10
15.	"In the Meantime"	3:45

== Charts ==
=== Weekly charts ===
Chart (2014)	Peak position
US Billboard 200	3
US Top R&B/Hip-Hop Albums (Billboard)	1

=== Year-end charts ===
Chart (2014)	Position
US Billboard 200	136
US Top R&B/Hip-Hop Albums (Billboard)	30

== Release history ==
Region	Date	Format(s)	Label	Ref.
Various	August 25, 2014	CD; digital download	Motown	
