= Album II (Kem album) =

Studio album by Kem
- Released: May 17, 2005
- Length: 50:51
- Label: Motown
- Producer: Kem; Carlos Gunn

Kem chronology
Kemistry (2003)	Album II (2005)	Intimacy: Album III (2010)

Album II is the second studio album American singer Kem. It was released by Motown Records on May 17, 2005, in the United States. The album debuted at number five on the US Billboard 200 with first-weeks sales of 140,000 copies, also topping the US Top R&B/Hip-Hop Albums. In 2014, it was certified platinum by the Recording Industry Association of America (RIAA). Album II spawned the single "I Can't Stop Loving You" which became a hit on adult contemporary R&B radio stations, reaching number 20 on the Hot R&B/Hip-Hop Songs.

== Critical reception ==
Professional ratings
Review scores
Source	Rating
Allmusic	3.5/5 stars

Andy Kellman, writing for Allmusic, found that Kem's "kind of R&B is kicked-back with sparse arrangements made elegantly rich with starlit keyboards, subtle guitar flicks, and feminine vocals. Understated but assured, his vocals exhibit a lot of range despite almost always remaining at the volume of a bedroom whisper. So he's really out place in the early 2000s, not stylistically disparate from what you'd hear late at night on a soul station in the late '70s or early '80s. On Album II, there's no stab taken at finding a younger or different audience."

== Chart performance ==
Album II debuted at number five on the US Billboard 200 with 140,000 copies sold in the first week released. Two months later, it was certified gold by the Recording Industry Association of America (RIAA) with an excess of 500,000 copies sold. In 2014, the album was certified platinum.

== Track listing ==
All songs written by Kem except where noted.

1. "Find Your Way (Back in My Life)" – 4:34
2. "Heaven" – 6:23
3. "Into You" – 5:04
4. "I Can't Stop Loving You" – 5:25
5. "Without You" – 4:10
6. "Set You Free" – 4:28
7. "I'm in Love" – 4:34
8. "True Love" – 4:27
9. "Each Other" – 3:46
10. "You Might Win" – 3:48
11. "I Get Lifted" (Richard Finch, Harry Wayne Casey) – 4:05

== Production ==
- Produced By Kem & Carlos Gunn (co-produced vocals)
- Engineers: Carlos Gunn, Eric Morgeson
- Assistant Engineers: Isaiah Abolin, Brian Russell
- Mixing: Ray Bardani
- Mastering: Chris Gehringer

== Personnel ==
- Kem: Keyboards, Lead & Backing Vocals
- Brian O'Neal: Keyboards, Synthesizers
- Quentin Baxter, Reggie McTaw: Guitars
- David McMurray: Saxophone
- Stevie Wonder: Harmonica
- Fred Robinson, Al Turner: Bass
- Ron Otis: Drums
- Marlon Curry: Percussion

== Charts ==
=== Weekly charts ===
Chart (2005)	Peak position
US Billboard 200	5
US Top R&B/Hip-Hop Albums (Billboard)	1

=== Year-end charts ===
Chart (2005)	Position
US Billboard 200	112
US Top R&B/Hip-Hop Albums (Billboard)	22
Chart (2006)	Position
US Top R&B/Hip-Hop Albums (Billboard)	80

== Certifications ==
Region	Certification	Certified units/sales
United States (RIAA)	Platinum	1,000,000^{^}
^{^} Shipments figures based on certification alone.
