= Intimacy: Album III =

Studio album by Kem
- Released: August 17, 2010
- Recorded: 2007–2010
- Genre: R&B
- Length: 45:43
- Label: Universal Motown
- Producer: Kem

Kem chronology
Album II (2005)	Intimacy: Album III (2010)	What Christmas Means (2012)

Singles from Intimacy: Album III
- 1. "Why Would You Stay" Released: May 18, 2010; 2. "Share My Life" Released: September 2010; 3. "If It's Love" Released: March 2011; 4. "You're On My Mind" Released: January 2012

Intimacy: Album III is the third studio album from R&B artist Kem.

It was released on August 17, 2010 on Motown Records. This is his first album in five years releasing two albums on Motown and his only release on Universal Motown records following the dissolution of the label. The first single, "Why Would You Stay", received a great deal of airplay, peaking at number 17 and 14 on Billboard's Hot R&B/Hip Hop Songs and Heatseekers charts respectively. Like other albums, it is self-produced by Kem and features a duet with Maurissa Rose and spoken word by Jill Scott. The album debuted at number 95 on the Hot R&B/Hip-hop albums chart and rose to number 2 the following week. A remix of "If It's Love" was also released, this time featuring R&B artist Chrisette Michele.

The album debuted at number two on the US Billboard 200 chart, selling 74,000 copies in its first week in the United States, becoming Kem's highest-charting set ever. In March 2012, the album was certified Gold by the RIAA.

Professional ratings
Review scores
Source	Rating
About.com	4/5 stars
AllMusic	4/5 stars

== Track listing ==
No.	Title	Producer(s)	Length
1.	"When I'm Loving You"	Kem	4:12
2.	"Can You Feel It"	Kem	6:07
3.	"Love Never Fails"	Kem	3:50
4.	"Share My Life"	Kem	4:21
5.	"Human Touch"	Kem	5:56
6.	"If It's Love" (featuring Maurissa Rose)	Kem, Melanie Rutherford	4:15
7.	"Why Would You Stay"	Kem	4:05
8.	"A Mother's Love"	Kem	4:20
9.	"You're On My Mind"	Kem	4:33
10.	"Golden Days" (featuring Jill Scott)	Kem, Jill Scott	4:41

== Charts ==
=== Weekly charts ===
Chart (2010)	Peak position
US Billboard 200	2
US Top R&B/Hip-Hop Albums (Billboard)	2

=== Year-end charts ===
Chart (2010)	Position
US Billboard 200	140
US Top R&B/Hip-Hop Albums (Billboard)	37
Chart (2011)	Position
US Billboard 200	160
US Top R&B/Hip-Hop Albums (Billboard)	37
Chart (2012)	Position
US Top R&B/Hip-Hop Albums (Billboard)	57

== Certifications ==
Region	Certification	Certified units/sales
United States (RIAA)	Gold	500,000^{^}
^{^} Shipments figures based on certification alone.
