= Love Always Wins =

Studio album by Kem
- Released: August 28, 2020
- Length: 50:48
- Label: Motown
- Producer: Derek "DOA" Allen; Kem

Kem chronology
Promise to Love (2014)	Love Always Wins (2020)	Full Circle (2022)

Love Always Wins is the sixth studio album by American singer Kem. It was released by Motown Records on August 28, 2020. The album marked Kem's first full-length project in six years.

== Critical reception ==
Professional ratings
Review scores
Source	Rating
AllMusic	4/5 stars

Andy Kellman, writing for AllMusic, found that Kem "returns with a reliably mellow, romantic, and gently uplifting album that embraces his role in adult contemporary R&B and at the same time more openly displays his inspirations and stretches out [...] Love Always Wins is more scuffed and groove-oriented than any previous Kem album."

== Track listing ==
Love Always Wins track listing
No.	Title	Writer(s)	Producer(s)	Length
1.	"Not Before You"	Kim Owens	Kem; Derek "DOA" Allen	4:20
2.	"Lonely" (featuring Brian Culbertson)	Owens	Kem; Allen	5:04
3.	"With You in My Life"	Owens	Kem; Allen	3:40
4.	"Love"	Owens	Kem; Allen	4:35
5.	"Praise"	Owens	Kem; Allen	3:52
6.	"Lie to Me"	Owens; Anthony Hamilton; James Poyser; Salaam Remi	Kem; Allen	3:51
7.	"Live Out Your Love"	Owens	Kem; Allen	4:12
8.	"Love Always Wins"	Owens; David Ritz	Kem; Allen	4:51
9.	"Friend Today"	Owens	Kem; Michael "Nomad" Ripoll^{[a]}	3:03
10.	"Can't Stop Giving Love"	Owens	Kem; Allen	4:16
11.	"Live Out Your Love" (featuring Toni Braxton)	Owens; Braxton	Kem; Allen	4:13
12.	"Love Always Wins" (featuring Erica Campbell)	Owens; Ritz	Kem; Allen	4:51

Target edition
No.	Title	Length
1.	"Not Before You"	4:20
2.	"Lonely" (featuring Brian Culbertson)	5:04
3.	"With You in My Life"	3:40
4.	"Love"	4:35
5.	"Praise"	3:52
6.	"Lie to Me"	3:51
7.	"Live Out Your Love"	4:12
8.	"Love Always Wins"	4:51
9.	"Father & Son"	3:45
10.	"Friend Today"	3:03
11.	"Can't Stop Giving Love"	4:16
12.	"Live Out Your Love" (featuring Toni Braxton)	4:13
13.	"Love Always Wins" (featuring Erica Campbell)	4:51
14.	"Face the Cloud"	3:46

Deluxe edition
No.	Title	Writer(s)	Producer(s)	Length
13.	"Lie to Me (Remix)" (featuring Wiz Khalifa)	Owens; Hamilton; Poyser; Remi; Cameron Thomaz; Brenda Russell	Kem; Allen	3:33
14.	"Not Before You (Remix)"	Owens; Ritz	Eric Hudson	4:16

Sample credits

- "Lie to Me (Remix)" contains an interpolation of "A Little Bit of Love" (1979) by Brenda Russell.

Notes

- ^{^[a]} signifies a co-producer

== Charts ==
Chart performance for Love Always Wins
Chart (2020)	Peak position
US Billboard 200	124
US Top R&B Albums (Billboard)	15

== Release history ==
Release dates and formats for Love Always Wins
Region	Date	Format(s)	Label	Ref.
Various	August 28, 2020	CD; digital download; streaming; vinyl	Motown	
