= Skin (Rihanna song) =

2010 song by Rihanna

Song by Rihanna

from the album Loud
- Released: March 27, 2011
- Recorded: August 2010 – March 2011
- Studio: Westlake Recording Studios (Los Angeles, California), Studio at the Palms (Paradise, Nevada)
- Genre: R&B
- Length: 5:04
- Label: Def Jam; SRP
- Songwriters: Ursula Yancy; Kenneth Coby; Robyn Fenty
- Producers: Soundz; Makeba Riddick; Kuk Harrell

Audio video
- "Skin" on YouTube

"Skin" is a song by Bajan recording artist Rihanna from her fifth studio album, Loud (2010). The song was written by Kenneth Coby, Ursula Yancy and Rihanna with production helmed by Soundz. Musically, "Skin" is a R&B song that contains influences from pop, dance-pop and dubstep genres, while lyrically, the song is about being in a relationship with someone and wanting to feel their skin.

The song received generally positive reviews from critics, as part of their overall review of Loud, praising "Skin"'s compositions as well as Rihanna's sensual vocal performance. The song was included on the set list of the Loud Tour (2011), where Rihanna retrieves a man or woman from the audience near the end of the song, and performs a lap-dance whilst on an elevated platform. "Skin" was also used in Rihanna's advertisement campaign for Armani Jeans.

== Background and composition ==
"Skin" was written by Kenneth Coby, Ursula Yancy and Rihanna, with production helmed by Coby under his stage name Soundz. The song was recorded at Studio at the Palms Casino Resort in Las Vegas, Nevada. "Skin" is written in the key of G minor and is set in common time with a moderate groove of 62 beats per minute. "Skin" is a R&B song, that contains elements of dance-pop and dubstep, while the song is composed with bass instruments, synthesizers and an electric guitar. As commented by Robbie Daw of Idolator, the song's "real" hook is "the fuzzy electric guitar" that begins sawing through the melody about three minutes in, and continues building until it reaches "a, er, climactic solo at the very end." Rihanna's vocal range in the song spans from the low note of G_{3} to the high note of B♭_{4}. As noted by Emily Mackay of NME, her vocals sound "restrained" and "controlled". Throughout the song, Rihanna sounds "suspenseful" and "sultry" as she sings the lyrics "I got secrets that I wanna show you". Thomas Conner of Chicago Sun-Times wrote that the singer "teases her man" and "lets him at her" as she sings the line "You've waited long enough" before instructing "Don't hold back/you know I like it rough".

== Critical reception ==
"Skin" was met with rave reviews. Of the multiple music critics who commented on the song, the majority praised "Skin"'s musical structure and Rihanna's vocal performance. Apart from writing about the song's composition, Daw called the ballad "smoldering" and compared the last minute of the song to Sade's "No Ordinary Love" for the song's sensual content, but noted that Adu's song is not as lyrically graphic as "Skin". Jon Pareles of The New York Times commented that Rihanna's sensuality in the song is evoked though her use of sexually suggestive moaning and heavy breathing, adding to the "slow, torrid buildup". Colin Gentry of 4Music noted that Rihanna appears to be transitioning from singing songs about partying and dancing in clubs to singing about her sexual fantasies and desires, writing "Rihanna swaggers through the album as a woman on the prowl, taking her conquests from the clubs to the bedroom. Demanding to know 'why are you standing over there with your clothes on?' on sultry track Skin, the Barbadian clearly means business." Ryan Dombell of Pitchfork concurred with Stern with regard to "Skin" being the singer's most mature song to date, writing "'Skin' is her sexiest song yet, a haunted, near-dubstep stunner that wouldn't sound totally out of place on Massive Attack's Mezzanine."

Ryan Burleson of Consequence commented that Rihanna's combines different emotions in the song to increase the level of provocativeness, writing "For its part, the Soundz-produced 'Skin' combines these emotions into a five-minute space-hop excursion into the boudoir, driving deep into the id with an austere, though undeniably potent amount of minor chords and bass." Andy Kellman of AllMusic chose "Skin" as one of the highlights on Loud, writing, "One song that sounds nothing like anything else in Rihanna's past is 'Skin,' a contender for anti-gravity slow jam of 2010 – a match for Trey Songz's 'Red Lipstick' and Usher's 'Mars vs Venus.'" USA Today's Steve Jones also put the song in his list of tracks from Loud to consider downloading. Jerry Shriver of the same publication found "down-and-dirty-ness" in the chorus of the song. James Skinner of BBC Online said that the line "I like it rough" was a little "uncomfortable in the light of her personal history". Thomas Conner of Chicago Sun-Times commented on Rihanna's sex appeal in the song, writing "the art of her seduction is oh-so slow and merciless".

== Armani Jeans campaign ==
The song was also used in Rihanna's advertisement campaign for Armani Jeans and Emporio Armani Underwear. The advert, which launched the brand's Fall 2011 line, was directed by Johan Renck and photographed by Steven Klein. In the advert, "Rihanna wears a short blonde wig and enters a vintage car with a bag of clothing, changing in the car and visible in her underwear while a bodyguard keeps watch. She then leaves the car wearing a dark leather jacket and Armani jeans and takes an elevator out of the underground parking lot to meet her partner-in-crime or love interest". Giorgio Armani said that Rihanna was a "pleasure to work with" and said that she "perfectly embodies" the spirit of his company. The advert, which was filmed in New York City and shot in monochrome, was also used to launch Armani's e-commerce site.

The advertisement received overwhelmingly positive reviews from critics, with The Huffington Post claiming that it was "sizzling". The magazine Stylist called the advert "saucy" and praised the fact that it "combines traces of metropolitan storytelling, cops 'n robbers movies with an ode to film noir, but with a lighter and ironic touch". Claiming that Rihanna is "at her steamy-best" in the "sultry" piece, the Hindustan Times said that the piece "is a must-watch, not just for its steam factor but for its visual and aesthetic sense too". Grazia also gave a positive review by saying that the advert was, among other things, "saucy" and "exciting".

== Live performances ==
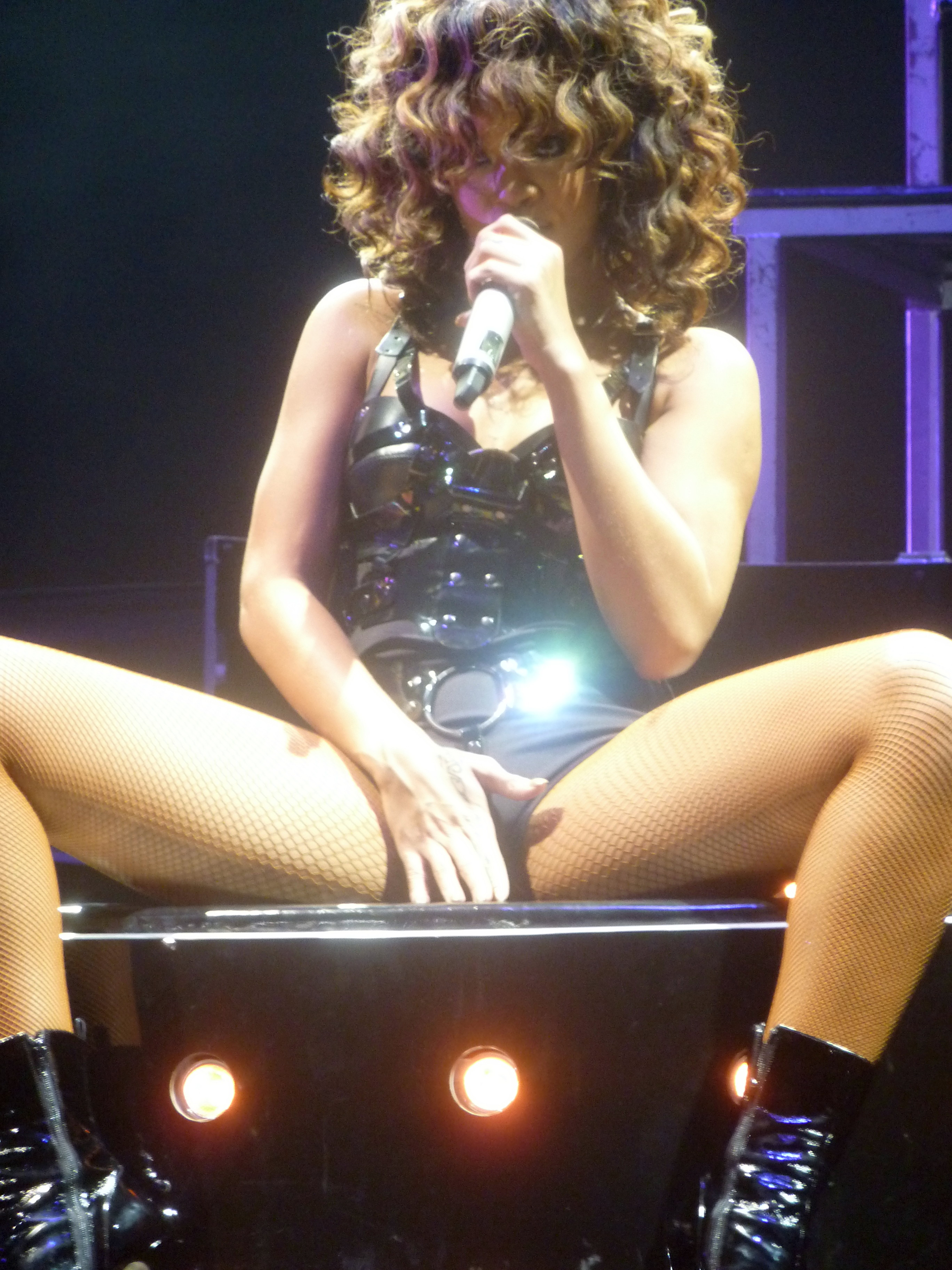
Rihanna performing "Skin" on the Loud Tour 2011 in France

Though the song has never been performed live as part of a televised performance, the song was featured on the set list of the Loud Tour. Before she performed "Skin", Rihanna appeared on stage with a set similar to that of her performance of "S&M" remix with Britney Spears at the 2011 Billboard Music Awards, wearing a black tuxedo and pink tie to perform a cover of Prince's "Darling Nikki", before transitioning into "S&M". As "S&M" started, Rihanna removed her tuxedo to reveal a white PVC body suit. After performing "S&M", Rihanna performed "Skin" while laying on raised platform, and at near the end of the performance said "this is the part of the show when we like to have a little fun – who wants to come up here and get freaky with me?" and takes a man out of the audience and pins them down on the platform, where she provocatively and sexually gyrates and grinds him as they are lowered under the stage as the song's instrumental ends and the lights go out. Rihanna has caused controversy by occasionally opting to perform the act with a woman instead.

The sexually suggestive performances of "Skin" have been met with mixed reactions from critics. A review for the Evening Herald argued that Rihanna should strip out the sex. The Daily Record praised Rihanna's Glasgow performance but argued that the lap dance at the end of the "Skin" routine was "a move that had parents covering their children's eyes". Catriona Stewart Lotte Jeffs, editor of ES Magazine, was one of the audience members who received a lap dance from Rihanna and reacted positively, saying "[i]t was a night I will never forget".

== Credits and personnel ==
- Robyn "Rihanna" Fenty – Vocals
- Kenneth Coby, Robyn Fenty and Ursula Yancy – Songwriting
- Soundz – Producer
- Makeba Riddick – Vocal production
- Kuk Harrel – Additional vocal production
- Nuno Bettencourt – guitar
- Rob Katz and Bobby Campbell – Assistant Engineering
- Mixed by Jayden Joshua at Larrabee Sound Studios, Los Angeles, California – Mixing
- Jesus Garnica – Assistant mixing
- Chad "C Note" Roper at Westlake Recording Studios, Los Angeles – Music recording
- Recorded by Kuk Harrel, Josh Gudwin and Marcus Tovar at Studio, Palms Casino Resort, Paradise, Nevada – Vocal recording

Credits and personnel adapted from the liner notes of Loud.

== Charts ==
Upon the release of Loud, "Skin" charted at number 66 on the South Korea Gaon International Chart for the issue dated November 14, 2010.

Chart (2010)	Peak position
South Korea Gaon International Chart	66

== Certifications ==
Region	Certification	Certified units/sales
Australia (ARIA)	Gold	35,000^{‡}
Brazil (Pro-Música Brasil)	Gold	30,000^{‡}
United Kingdom (BPI)	Silver	200,000^{‡}
United States (RIAA)	Gold	500,000^{‡}
^{‡} Sales+streaming figures based on certification alone.
