= Do It (Toni Braxton song) =

Single by Toni Braxton

from the album Spell My Name
- Released: April 6, 2020
- Studio: Brandon's Way Recording Studios (Los Angeles, CA)
- Genre: R&B
- Length: 2:52
- Label: Island
- Songwriters: Percy Bady; Kenneth Edmonds; Toni Braxton; Paul Boutin; Antonio Dixon
- Producer: Antonio Dixon

Toni Braxton singles chronology
"FOH" (2018)	"Do It" (2020)	"Live Out Your Love" (2020)

Missy Elliott singles chronology
"Cool Off" (2020)	"Do It" (2020)	"Levitating (The Blessed Madonna Remix)" (2020)

"Do It" is a song by American singer Toni Braxton. It was written by Braxton along with Percy Bady, Paul Boutin, Kenneth Edmonds, and Antonio Dixon for her tenth studio album Spell My Name (2020), while production was helmed by Dixon. The R&B ballad was released as the album's first single on April 6, 2020, also serving as Braxton's debut with Island Records. It peaked at number 1 on the US Adult R&B Songs chart.

== Background ==
"Do It" was written Braxton, Percy Bady, Paul Boutin, and Antonio Dixon. Due to the COVID-19 pandemic, Dixon had to do some of the final mixing sessions over Zoom due to the lockdown orders that were handed down in California in March 2020. In a press release, Braxton revealed that the song was initially written in 2019 when one of her friends was going through the struggles of trying to end a bad relationship. The singer further commented: "We have all been through situations like this when there is really nothing more to say, you know he’s not right and you just need to do what you need to do. There is also an element of hope in the song, that after you do what you need to do things will get better.”

== Critical reception ==
Christine Imarenezor from Vibe called "Do It" an encouraging ballad on which Braxton "sings over a piano and violin-assisted melody, while offering encouraging advice of letting go of unhealthy or toxic love." Rap-Up found that "the sultry track hits close to home for Braxton", while SoulTracks called the song a "forlorn ballad about a lover", adding that "when Toni Braxton is singing sad, she’s usually doing something special. And "Do It" feels just right." Elias Light from Rolling Stone found that the song was "glacial but sweeping, a slow-rolling ballad that practically commands a friend to leave a crumbling relationship."

== Promotion ==
Two lyric videos for "Do It" premiered online during April 2020, one depicting a close-up performance from Braxton and the other of her lips mouthing the lyrics. A homemade, phone-shot performance for "Do It" was also released on her YouTube account, showing her lip-syncing the song in a lace bra.

== Remixes ==
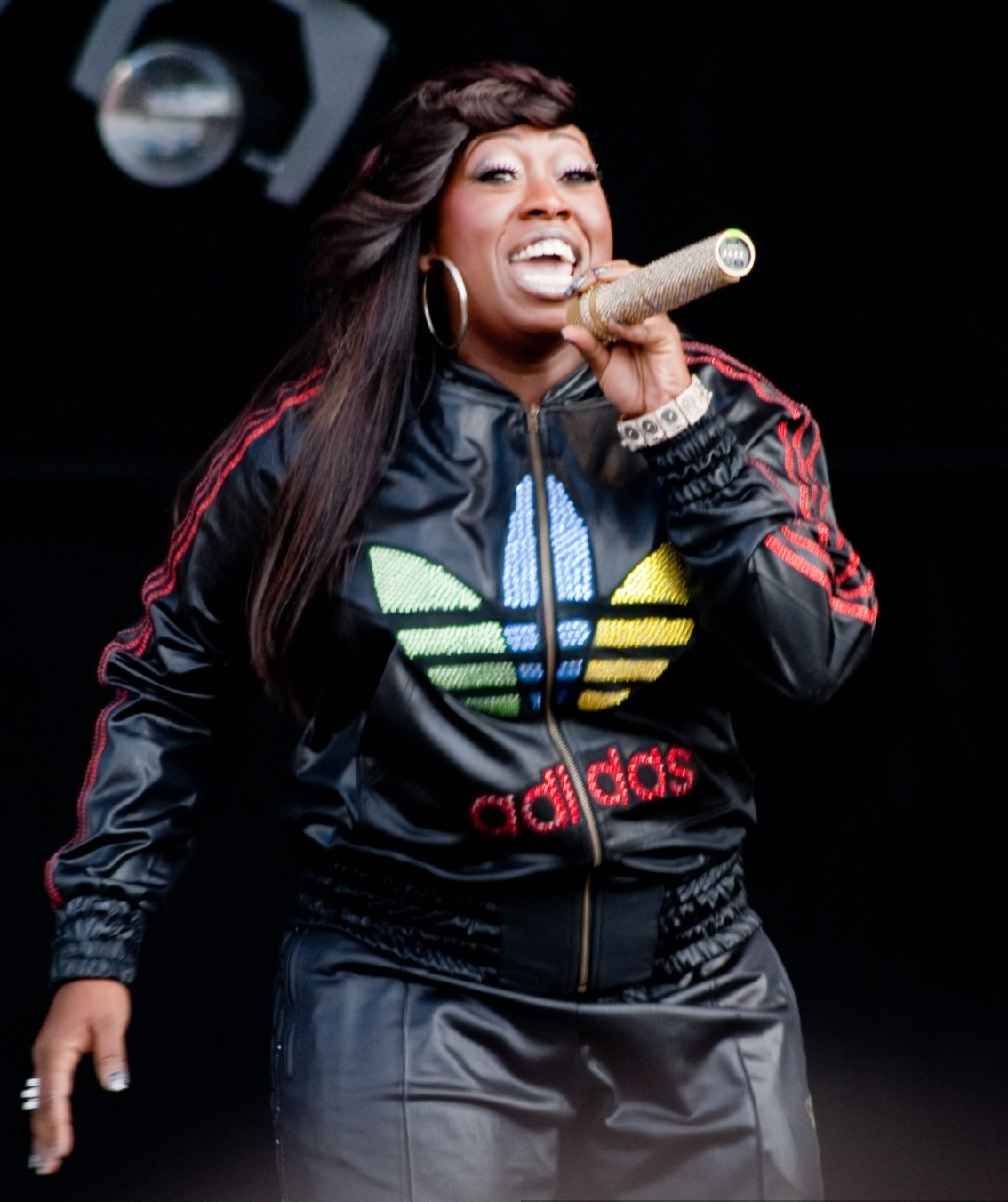
Missy Elliott produced and appears on a remix version of "Do It".

On May 8, 2020, Braxton's team released the Zac Samuel Remix of "Do It" to her YouTube account, a house-fused uptempo remix of the song that was provided by British DJ Zac Samuel. On June 26, 2020, Braxton released another official remix featuring rapper Missy Elliott, which was produced by Elliott along with PromoBoi and Hannon Lane. In a press statement that preceded its release, Elliott, who had never worked directly with Braxton before, commented: "Toni’s team reached out to my manager and asked if I could produce a remix for her next single. They said, ‘Hey if Missy wants to rap on it we would love that too.’ So they sent me the record and my boy Hannon and I, sped the track up to a mid-tempo and re-arranged the music.” Elliott's remix, along with Dixon's original version, was included on the standard version of parent album Spell My Name (2020).

== Credits and personnel ==
Credits lifted from the single's liner notes.

- Percy Bady – keyboards, writing
- Paul Boutin – mixing, vocal production, writing
- Toni Braxton – vocals, vocal production, writing
- Antonio Dixon – keyboards, production, writing
- Nigel Bond – production, writing
- Demonte Posey – strings
- Herb Powers Jr. – mastering

== Charts ==
=== Weekly charts ===
Chart (2020)	Peak position
US Adult R&B Songs (Billboard)	1
US Hot R&B Songs (Billboard)	13
US R&B/Hip-Hop Airplay (Billboard)	11

=== Year-end charts ===
Chart (2020)	Position
US Adult R&B Songs (Billboard)	8

== Release history ==
List of release dates, showing region, release format, label, and reference
Region	Date	Format	Label	Ref.
Various	April 6, 2020	digital download, streaming	Island	
