= In the Mix (film) =

2005 film by Ron Underwood

- Theatrical release poster
- Directed by: Ron Underwood
- Screenplay by: Jacqueline Zambrano
- Story by: Chanel Capra; Cara Dellaverson; Brian Rubenstein
- Produced by: John Dellaverson
- Starring: Usher; Chazz Palminteri; Emmanuelle Chriqui
- Cinematography: Clark Mathis
- Edited by: Don Brochu
- Music by: Aaron Zigman
- Production companies: J&C Entertainment; Ush Entertainment
- Distributed by: Lions Gate Films (United States); 20th Century Fox (international)
- Release date: November 23, 2005 (United States)
- Running time: 95 minutes
- Country: United States
- Language: English
- Box office: $10.2 million

In the Mix is a 2005 American romantic crime comedy-drama film directed by Ron Underwood and starring Usher, Chazz Palminteri, and Emmanuelle Chriqui. The film's plot follows Darrell, a popular DJ who is hired to play music at a party for Frank, a mob leader. However, he soon gets in trouble when he falls in love with Frank's daughter, Dolly. Released in the United States by Lions Gate Films on November 23, 2005, with 20th Century Fox releasing in other territories, it was a critical and commercial flop, grossing only $10.2 million.

== Plot ==
While working in New York's hottest night club, disc jockey Darrell Williams is asked to DJ a party for his friend Frankie Jr.'s mob boss father Frank, whom Darrell's father worked for. Frank is planning a surprise party for his daughter Dolly, who is coming home from law school for summer break.

At the party, Darrell takes a bullet meant for Frank and saves his life. Frank takes Darrell to stay at Frank's house while healing from the gunshot wound. During this time, Dolly decides she wants to go out shopping. Due to the attempted assassination, Frank will not allow her to go out without a bodyguard. After he tries to assign her Jackie, he tells her anyone in the house is qualified to escort her, and she picks Darrell. He accepts a job with Frank to be Dolly's escort and live at the residence.

The next morning, Dolly wakes Darrell to go out. They start at a yoga class, where Darrell attracts women's attention. Dolly and Darrell go to lunch, where she meets her girlfriends and they have Darrell sit with them and give them advice about their men. After leaving the restaurant, Dolly is almost hit by a car and Darrell saves her. Jackie witnesses this and tells Frank. Frank invites Dolly's boyfriend to dinner. At dinner, Dolly excuses herself and goes to the garden. When Darrell comes home after being at the club, he finds Dolly in the pool. She invites Darrell to join her. In the pool, Dolly starts to flirt with Darrell.

The next evening, Dolly and Chad go out with Darrell as their driver and end up at Darrell's favorite restaurant. When Cherise approaches Darrell, Chad—jealous about Dolly giving Darrell attention—asks her to join them. After dinner, Darrell ditches Cherise and Dolly sends Chad home. They go to Darrell's apartment/studio and are kissing before they are startled by Darrell's cat. Darrell tries to distance himself from Dolly, due to her having a boyfriend and out of respect for her father, but he is falling for Dolly, and takes her to meet Big Momma. Darrell and Dolly go to the club where Darrell works. While they are dancing, Jackie approaches them, pulling a gun on Darrell. Dolly and Darrell leave the club and go to Darrell's friend's place, where they play poker with Darrell's friends. They return to Darrell's apartment/studio and spend the night together. The next morning, Dolly attempts to tell her father about her relationship with Darrell, but his bodyguard Fish comes in. She tells Frank they will talk later.

Dolly and Darrell leave the house and go to the spa together. While Dolly is in the shower, Frank shows up and his men rough up Darrell. When they take Darrell to their car to put him in the trunk, they find Salvatore dead. Dolly has a meeting with her father and agrees to end her relationship with Darrell. Dolly returns to Darrell's apartment/studio and tells him she is going to marry Chad. After she leaves, Darrell is kidnapped at gunpoint by one of Salvatore's men. Frank receives a call from Jackie that Dolly is with Darrell. Frank goes to the club and finds Dolly and Darrell together, kidnapped, with Dolly bound and gagged with duct tape. Frank Jr. follows his father to the club, and activates the strobe light and fog machine to distract the kidnappers. Jackie uses Dolly to make Frank put down his gun. Jackie attempts to shoot Dolly, and Darrell again gets shot, this time taking a bullet for Dolly. Frank finally accepts Darrell and Dolly being together. At the wedding reception for Darrell and Dolly, Frank gives Dolly his blessing on her marriage to Darrell.

== Cast ==
- Usher as Darrell Williams
- Chazz Palminteri as Frank Pacelli
- Emmanuelle Chriqui as Dolly Pacelli
- Kevin Hart as "Busta"
- Robert Costanzo as Tony "Fat Tony"
- Robert Davi as "Fish"
- Matt Gerald as Jackie
- Anthony Fazio as Frankie Pacelli Jr.
- Geoff Stults as Chad
- Chris Tardio as Angelo
- K.D. Aubert as Cherise Jackson
- Isis Faust as Lexi
- Nick Mancuso as Salvatore Vincenzo
- Page Kennedy as "Twizzie"
- Deezer D as Joe "JoJo"
- Jennifer Echols as "Big Momma"
- Dwight Hicks as Bouncer

== Release ==
The film grossed $10,223,896 at the US box office.

== Reception ==
In the Mix received negative reviews from critics. On Rotten Tomatoes, it holds an approval rating of 14% based on 37 reviews, with an average rating of 3.3/10. The website's critics consensus reads, "Fans may get a kick out of seeing Usher showcasing his charm on screen, but the movie itself is tone deaf and inconsequential, even by rom-com standards." On Metacritic, the film has a weighted score of 31 based on 15 critics, indicating "generally unfavorable" reviews.

== Home media ==
In the Mix was released on VHS and DVD on March 21, 2006, by Lionsgate.

== Soundtrack ==
1. Rico Love – "Settle Down"
2. One Chance Jon A. Gordon, Michael A. Gordon (The Gordon Brothers)– "That's My Word"
3. Christina Milian – "Be What It's Gonna Be"
4. Chris Brown – "Which One" (featuring Noah!)
5. Keri Hilson – "Hands & Feet"
6. Rico Love – "Sweat" (featuring Usher)
7. Ryon Lovett – "Get Acquainted"
8. One Chance, Jon A. Gordon, Michael A. Gordon (The Gordon Brothers)– "Could This Be Love"
9. Anthony Hamilton – "Some Kind of Wonderful"
10. Robin Thicke – "Against the World"
11. YoungBloodz – "Murda" (featuring Cutty and Fat Dog)
12. Rico Love – "On the Grind" (featuring Juelz Santana and Paul Wall)
