= Look at Her =

Single by One Chance featuring Fabo
- Released: July 26, 2006 (U.S.)
- Recorded: 2006
- Genre: Snap&B
- Length: 4:01
- Label: J
- Songwriter(s): Ryon Lovett, Jon A. Gordon (The Gordon Brothers), Michael A. Gordon (The Gordon Brothers), Courtney J. Vantrease Jr., Robert L. Brent III
- Producer(s): Soundz, Chocolate Star

One Chance singles chronology
"That's My Word" (2006)	"Look at Her" (2006)	"U Can't" (2008)

"Look at Her" is a song by R&B group One Chance. It was released as a single on July 26, 2006, by J Records. It features Fabo of the rap group D4L. It was produced by Soundz, a producer based in Milwaukee and Atlanta.

== Track listing ==
- "Look at Her" (Radio Edit)
- "Look at Her" (Soundz Remix)
- "Look at Her" (featuring Lloyd, Bobby Valentino, and Trey Songz)

== Music video ==
The video shows the group getting ready for and performing a show at Mosley Park in Atlanta (with several girls getting excited in the process). US Records labelmate Rico Love makes a cameo appearance in the video.

Usher introduces the group as a radio presenter. Fabo made appearances dancing like he does in the "Laffy Taffy" video. Ciara appears in the video as well.

== Remixes ==
The rap remix features labelmate Rico Love, and is basically the same song with an additional verse by Rico at the beginning. The R&B remix features Lloyd, Bobby Valentino, and Trey Songz, and has an entirely different beat and lyrics.

== Chart performance ==
The song peaked at number 53 on Billboard's Hot R&B/Hip-Hop Songs chart.
