= Love Calls (song) =

2002 single by Kem

Single by Kem featuring Floetry (remix only)

from the album Kemistry
- Released: November 26, 2002 (original version); January 27, 2004 (remix)
- Recorded: 2002
- Genre: Neo soul
- Length: 5:15 (album version); 3:59 (single edit)
- Label: Motown
- Songwriter: Kem Owens
- Producer: Kem Owens

Kem singles chronology
"Love Calls" (00000000)	"Find Your Way (Back in My Life)" (2005)

Floetry singles chronology
"Wanna B Where U R (Thisizzaluvsong)" (2003)	"Love Calls" (2004)	"Supastar" (2005)

Music video
- "Love Calls" on YouTube

"Love Calls" is a song written, produced and performed by American neo soul singer Kem, issued as the only official single from his debut studio album Kemistry ("Matter of Time" was later issued as a promotional single). The remix of the song features vocals from British neo soul group Floetry. The single peaked at #25 on the Billboard R&B chart in 2004.

== Music video ==
The official music video for "Love Calls" was directed by Brian Campbell.

== Charts ==
=== Weekly charts ===
Chart (2003)	Peak position
US Bubbling Under Hot 100 (Billboard)	6
US Hot R&B/Hip-Hop Songs (Billboard)	25

=== Year-end charts ===
Chart (2003)	Position
US Hot R&B/Hip-Hop Songs (Billboard)	68
