= Kem (singer) =

American singer (born 1967)

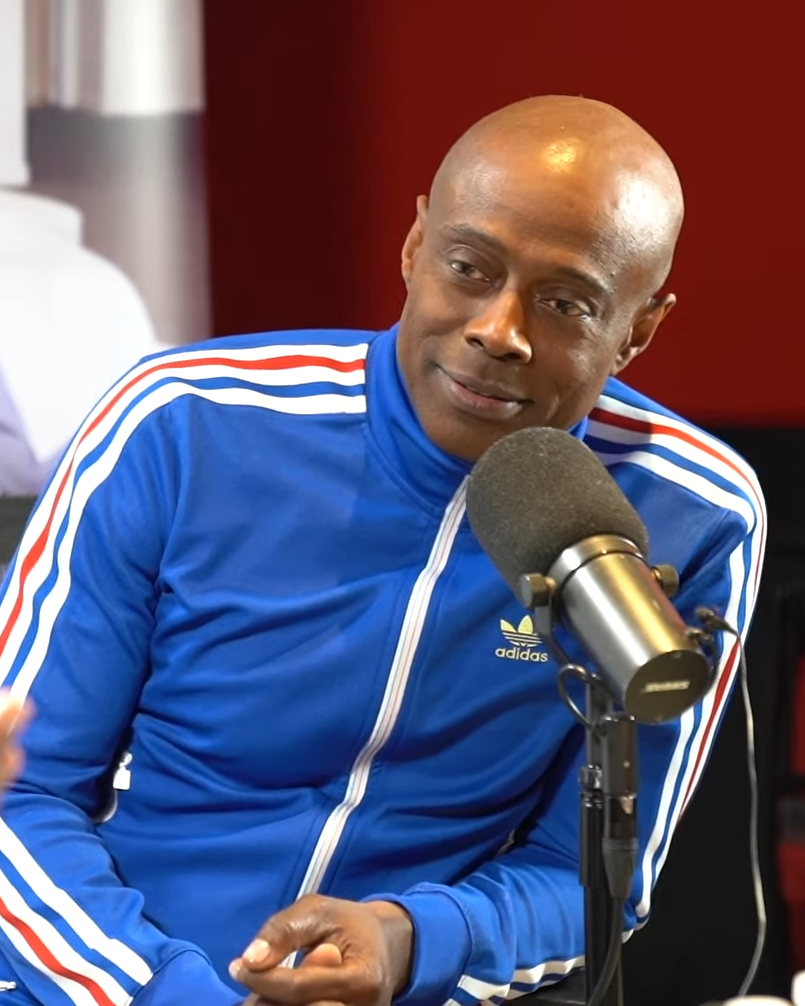
- Kem in 2023

Background information
- Born: Kim Lamont Owens; July 23, 1967 (age 58); Nashville, Tennessee, U.S.
- Origin: Southfield, Michigan, U.S.
- Genres: R&B; soul; jazz; neo soul
- Occupations: Singer; songwriter; instrumentalist; producer
- Instruments: Vocals; piano; keyboards
- Years active: 1999–present
- Labels: Motown
- Website: musicbykem.com

Kim Lamont Owens (born July 23, 1967), known professionally as Kem, is an American R&B/soul singer-songwriter and producer.

== Biography ==
Kim Lamont Owens was born on July 23, 1967 in Nashville, Tennessee. He moved to suburban Detroit at age 5 and was raised in both Pontiac and Southfield, Michigan.

Kem wrote, produced, and financed his self-released debut album, Kemistry, with his American Express card and by singing top 40 cover tunes in a wedding band and waiting tables. He was signed by Motown Records in November 2001, which re-released the album on February 25, 2003. It sold more than 500,000 copies nationwide and was certified Gold by the RIAA. The album's only official single is "Love Calls".

His second album, Album II, was released on May 17, 2005, and was certified Platinum by the RIAA. It includes the single "I Can't Stop Loving You", a #1 song at urban adult contemporary radio, and the song "You Might Win" featuring Stevie Wonder on harmonica. His third album, Intimacy: Album III, was released on August 17, 2010, and was certified Gold by the RIAA.

In 2013, Kem was featured on "My Favorite Thing", with American recording artist Ronald Isley who Kem wrote and produced for. The song is the second single from Isley's album This Song Is For You.

On August 25, 2014, Kem released his fourth studio album, Promise to Love. He performed the Grammy-nominated song "Nobody" from the album on the syndicated daytime talk show Steve Harvey (which series also features a theme song by Kem) during the fourth season. On August 28, 2020, he released his fifth studio album, Love Always Wins, which includes the singles "Lie To Me" and "Live Out Your Love" featuring Toni Braxton.

== Personal life ==
Owens married his wife Erica in 2019. They have seven children and announced in December 2025 they are expecting their eighth.

== Discography ==
=== Studio albums ===
| Title | Album details | Peak positions | | Certifications |
| Title | Album details | US | US R&B | Certifications |
|---|---|---|---|---|
| Kemistry | Released: February 25, 2003; Label: Motown; Format: CD, digital download | 90 | 14 | RIAA: Gold |
| Album II | Released: May 17, 2005; Label: Motown; Format: CD, digital download | 5 | 1 | RIAA: Platinum |
| Intimacy: Album III | Released: August 17, 2010; Label: Universal Motown; Format: CD, digital download | 2 | 2 | RIAA: Gold |
| What Christmas Means | Released: October 16, 2012; Label: Kemistry, Motown; Format: CD, digital download | 64 | 9 | |
| Promise to Love | Released: August 25, 2014; Label: Kemistry, Motown; Format: CD, digital download | 3 | 1 | |
| Love Always Wins | Released: August 28, 2020; Label: Motown; Format: CD, digital download | 124 | 15 | |

=== Live albums ===
| Title | Album details |
|---|---|
| Anniversary – The Live Album | Released: April 4, 2023; Label: Motown; Format: CD, LP, digital download |

=== Extended plays ===
| Title | EP details |
|---|---|
| Full Circle | Released: July 22, 2022; Label: Motown; Format: CD, digital download |
| Be Mine for Christmas | Released: November 17, 2023; Label: uDiscover; Format: Digital download |

=== Singles ===
| Title | Year | Chart Positions | | | Album |
| Title | Year | US | US R&B | US Adult R&B | Album |
|---|---|---|---|---|---|
| "Love Calls" | 2003 | 106 | 25 | 1 | Kemistry |
| "Matter of Time" | 2003 | — | — | 24 | Kemistry |
| "I Can't Stop Loving You" | 2005 | 84 | 20 | 1 | Album II |
| "Find Your Way (Back in My Life)" | 2005 | — | 37 | 4 | Album II |
| "Into You" | 2005 | — | 79 | 17 | Album II |
| "Why Would You Stay" | 2010 | 102 | 17 | 1 | Intimacy: Album III |
| "Share My Life" | 2010 | — | 25 | 5 | Intimacy: Album III |
| "If It's Love" (solo or featuring Chrisette Michele) | 2011 | — | 24 | 3 | Intimacy: Album III |
| "You're On My Mind" | 2012 | — | 25 | 4 | Intimacy: Album III |
| "A Christmas Song for You" | 2012 | — | — | 19 | What Christmas Means |
| "Be Mine for Christmas" (featuring Ledisi) | 2013 | — | — | 35 | What Christmas Means |
| "Jesus" (featuring Patti LaBelle & Ronald Isley) | 2013 | — | — | 25 | What Christmas Means |
| "My Favorite Thing" (with Ronald Isley) | 2013 | — | — | 5 | Promise to Love |
| "It's You" | 2014 | — | 49 | 1 | Promise to Love |
| "Nobody" | 2014 | — | — | 1 | Promise to Love |
| "Promise to Love" | 2015 | — | — | 5 | Promise to Love |
| "Lie to Me" (solo or featuring Wiz Khalifa) | 2020 | — | — | 1 | Love Always Wins |
| "Live Out Your Love" (featuring Toni Braxton) | 2020 | — | — | 1 | Love Always Wins |
| "Stuck on You" | 2022 | — | — | 1 | Full Circle |
| "Right on Time" (featuring Rick Ross) | 2022 | — | — | 12 | Full Circle |
| "Give My Love" | 2025 | — | — | — | Non-album singles |
| "Rock with Me" | 2025 | — | — | 1 | Non-album singles |

== Awards and nominations ==
- 2005: Billboard Music Award win for Top Adult R&B Single of the Year, "I Can't Stop Loving You"
- 2005: Billboard Music Award nomination for Top Adult R&B Artist of the Year (lost to Fantasia).
- 2011: 53rd Grammy Awards, Best R&B Male Performance, “Why Would You Stay” (Nomination)
- 2011: 53rd Grammy Awards, Best R&B Song, "Why Would You Stay" (Nomination)
- 2014: 57th Grammy Awards, Best Traditional R&B Performance, "Nobody" (Nomination)
