= Rhian Benson =

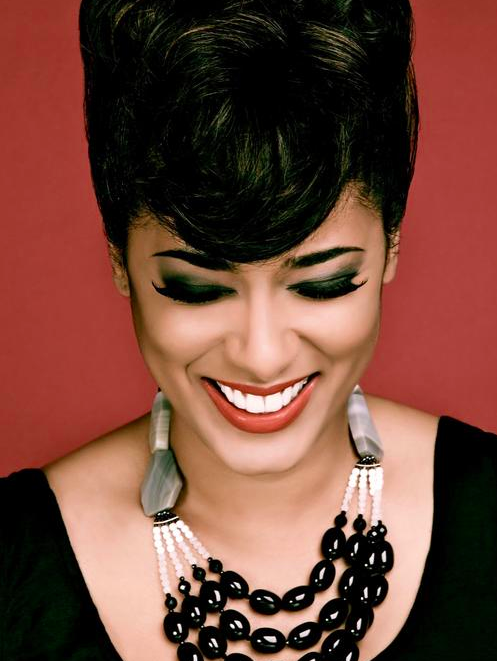

Background information
- Born: Rhiannon Afua Benson; 10 January 1977 (age 48); Accra, Ghana
- Genres: Soul; jazz; R&B; neo soul
- Occupations: Singer-songwriter; instrumentalist; record producer
- Instruments: Guitar; piano; keyboards
- Years active: 2003–present
- Website: RhianBenson.com

Rhiannon Afua "Rhian" Benson (born 10 January 1977 in Accra, Ghana) is a Ghanaian-British soul and jazz singer and songwriter.

== Early life ==
Benson was born in Accra, Ghana, to a Welsh mother, a singer, and an Ashanti father, a guitarist. She has a younger sister and a brother. She was raised in Ghana, India (where her family moved following a diplomatic posting of her father), and her mother's native United Kingdom, where she eventually settled. Benson began playing piano and guitar and writing songs and poetry early. Before pursuing a music career, she attended the London School of Economics and gained a degree in econometrics.She continued her education by studying Economics through Harvard's extension certificate program, which she did not complete due to the illness of her mother. Benson later worked at an investment bank.

== Career ==
Once back in the UK, she performed in small London clubs and was discovered by the Los Angeles-based record label DKG Music. Benson moved to Los Angeles, California, to record her debut album, Gold Coast, released in October 2003. She wrote all the songs on the album, having composed the music on guitar and keyboards, and co-produced it with producers Bob Power and James Poyser.

Benson won a Mobo Award in 2005.

With the help of Denmark's production duo, Jonas Rendbo and Daniel Fridell, Benson released her second album, Hands Clean, on 14 February 2011. The album redefined modern soul as Benson sang with soulful electronic backing. The confessional tales of love, loss and life represented a bold, new direction for her. "Better Without You" was the first single released in February 2011.

== Discography ==
=== Albums ===
- 2003: Gold Coast
- 2011: Hands Clean

=== Singles ===
- 2003: "Say How I Feel" – UK No. 27
- 2003: "Stealing My Piece Of Mind"
- 2011: "Better Without You"
