= Purple Songs Can Fly =

American non-profit organization

- Founded: March 2006
- Founder: Anita Kruse
- Location: Houston, Texas

Purple Songs Can Fly is a non-profit organization that sponsors a music program at the Texas Children's Cancer Center in Houston, Texas. It allows patients at the hospital to compose and record songs in a real studio.

The program was founded in March 2006 by Anita Kruse, a songwriter and pianist. The Love Street Light Circus donated $10,000 to build a studio at the hospital. By December 2021, patients have recorded over 2800 songs.

According to David Poplack, "the arts have therapeutic value" and can improve the recovery of the patients.

In 2007, seven songs created through Purple Songs Can Fly were burned on purple CDs and were then played on Continental Airlines flights.

PSCF released their 3000th song in 2023. The same year, the Japan Branch was approved to begin work with young cancer patients.
