= One Chance (group) =

American band

- Origin: Chicago, Illinois, U.S.
- Genres: R&B
- Years active: 2005–2011
- Labels: US/J (2005–2009); Infrared/Nappy Boy (2009-2012)
- Members: Robert "Rob" Brent; Jonathan "Jon" Gordon; Michael "Mike" Gordon; Courtney Vantrease
- Past members: Terrell Jones Jr.

One Chance was an American R&B group of Chicago, Illinois, best known for their 2006 song "Look at Her," which peaked at number 53 on the Billboard R&B chart and was later remixed featuring Trey Songz, Lloyd, and Bobby Valentino.

== Biography ==
One Chance, an R&B group of Chicago composed of brothers Jon Gordon (co-founder) and Michael "Mic" Gordon (co-founder) p/k/a The Gordon Brothers, Rob Brent (member), and Courtney Vantrease (member), signed to J Records after being discovered by Grammy-Award-Winning artist Usher.

Usher discovered One Chance during a live showcase, and immediately organized a meeting for the boy band to perform for music legend Clive Davis, Founder of J Records, who signed them on the spot. In 2006, the band released their first single, "Look at Her", which peaked at #53 on the U.S Billboard Hot R&B/ Hip-Hop Songs Chart. In 2008, their second single entitled, “U Can’t” ft. Usher, quickly climbed the U.S Billboard R&B Songs Chart to #73. Originally a quintet, the band's debut was on the 2005 soundtrack for In the Mix, with the songs "That's My Word" and "Could This Be Love". featuring former band member, Terrell Jones Jr., who can be seen in its videos.

Originally slated for release in late 2006, their debut album, Private, was repeatedly pushed back and eventually shelved due to the ever-changing executive team at J Records. One Chance later requested to be released from US Records and J Records in 2008.

In June 2009, the band signed to artist T-Pain's Nappy Boy Entertainment, focusing primarily on writing and vocal producing for T-Pain. On September 23, 2010, One Chance released their single, "Sexin' on You", from their mixtape, Ain't No Room For Talkin', and co-wrote T-Pain's single "Reverse Cowgirl".

In 2011 band members Rob Brent and Courtney Vantrease amicably parted ways to pursue solo careers. Their last release as a group was the June 2011 single "Super Dewper", which featured T-Pain and Smoke of Field Mob. In 2012 Co-founders and brothers, Jon and Michael "Mic" Gordon, formed the singer-songwriter duo, The Gordon Brothers.

== Discography ==
=== Albums ===
| Year | Title | Singles |
|---|---|---|
| 2006 | Private: Shelved; Label: US/J | "That's My Word"; "Look at Her" |
| 2011 | Ain't No Room For Talkin': Mixtape; Label: Infrared/Nappy Boy | "Sexin' On You"; "Rock Bottom" |

=== Mixtapes ===
- 2011: Ain't No Room For Talkin
- 2011: The Chicago Quartet (With DJ NB)

=== As lead artist ===
| Year | Song | U.S. R&B | Album |
|---|---|---|---|
| 2006 | "That's My Word/Could This Be Love" | — | In the Mix Soundtrack |
| 2006 | "Look at Her" (featuring Fabo) | 53 | Non-album singles |
| 2007 | "My Word" | — | Non-album singles |
| 2008 | "U Can't" (featuring Yung Joc) | 73 | Non-album singles |
| 2010 | "Sexin' On You" | — | Ain't No Room For Talkin' |

=== As featured artist ===
List of singles as a guest vocalist, with selected chart positions and certifications
| Title | Year | Peak chart positions | | Album |
| Title | Year | CAN | UK | Album |
|---|---|---|---|---|
| "Billionaire" (Remix) (Travie McCoy featuring Bruno Mars, T-Pain, One Chance and Gucci Mane) | 2010 | — | — | Lazarus |
"—" denotes items which were not released in that country or failed to chart.

=== Guest appearances ===
| Title | Year | Album |
|---|---|---|
| "Imma Do It Big" (Brandon T. Jackson featuring One Chance and T-Pain) | 2011 | Big Mommas: Like Father, Like Son OST |
| "Drowning Again" (T-Pain featuring One Chance) | 2011 | Revolver |
