= Paul Boutin =

American journalist (1961–2025)

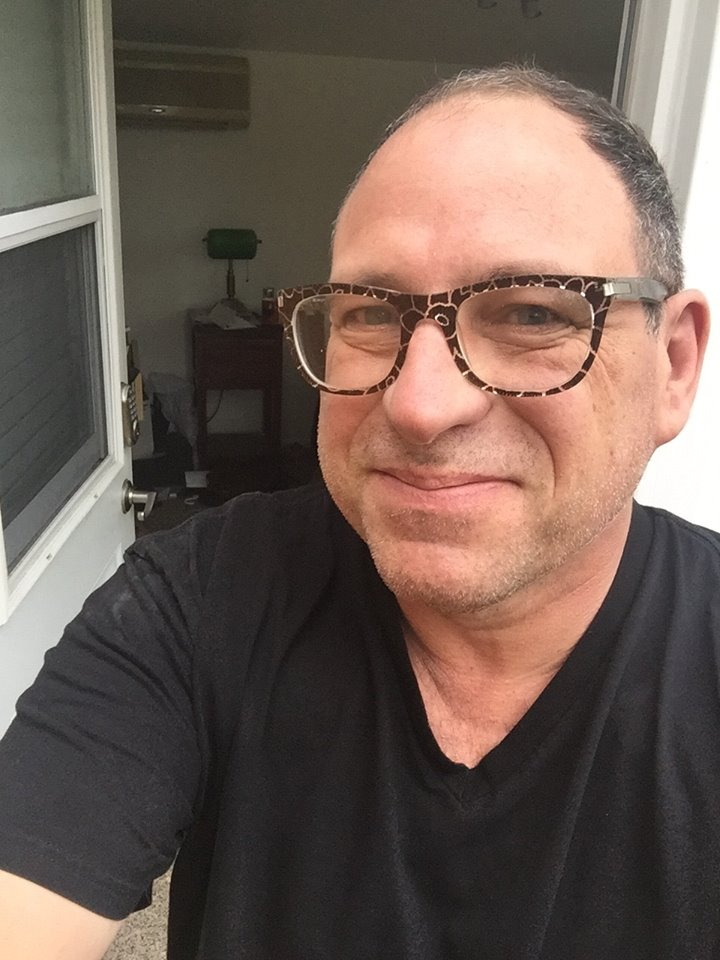
- Boutin in 2016
- Born: December 11, 1961; Lewiston, Maine, U.S.
- Died: October 18, 2025 (aged 63)

Paul Boutin (December 11, 1961 – October 18, 2025) was an American magazine writer and editor who wrote about technology in a pop-culture context.

Boutin, who began writing for Wired in 1997, wrote for The New York Times from 2003 to 2013, covered emerging technologies for MIT's Technology Review, and was a freelancer for Newsweek. From 2009 to 2010 he covered Internet business and culture for VentureBeat. He was a senior writer and editor for Silicon Valley gossip site Valleywag from 2006 to 2008, and a tech columnist for Slate from 2002 to 2008.

His work has also appeared in Bloomberg Businessweek, The New Republic, MSNBC, Reader's Digest, Adweek, Engadget, Salon.com, Outside, Cargo, Business 2.0, the Independent Film & Video Monthly, InfoWorld and PC World.

Before turning pro as a journalist, he spent 15 years as an engineer and manager at MIT, where he worked on Project Athena, and at several Internet-related startup companies in Silicon Valley including Splunk. Before his death, he worked as a strategy consultant to tech startups. He was the creator and maintainer of the supervent open-source synthetic event generator.
