= Adult R&B Songs =

Billboard song chart

The Adult R&B Songs chart (also called Adult R&B Airplay) is an airplay chart that is published weekly by Billboard magazine. The chart tracks and measures the airplay of songs played on urban adult contemporary radio stations, whose playlist mostly include contemporary R&B and traditional R&B tracks. Nielsen Audio sometimes refers to the format as Urban adult contemporary radio. Billboard created the chart in September 1993, with the first number one being "Another Sad Love Song" by Toni Braxton.

== Chart criteria ==
There are thirty positions on this chart and it is solely based on radio airplay. 65 urban AC radio stations are electronically monitored 24 hours a day, seven days a week by. Songs are ranked based on the number of plays that each song received during that week.

Songs receiving the greatest growth will receive a "bullet", although there are tracks that will also get bullets if the loss in detections doesn't exceed the percentage of downtime from a monitored station. "Airpower" awards are issued to songs that appear on the top 20 of both the airplay and audience chart for the first time, while the "greatest gainer" award is given to song with the largest increase in detections. A song with six or more spins in its first week is awarded an "airplay add". If a song is tied for the most spins in the same week, the one with the biggest increase that previous week will rank higher, but if both songs show the same amount of spins regardless of detection the song that is being played at more stations is ranked higher. Songs that fall below the top 15 and have been on the chart after 20 weeks are removed.

== Artist achievements ==
=== Most number-ones ===
Number of Singles	Artist	Source
14	Alicia Keys	
12	Tank	
11	Toni Braxton	
11	Charlie Wilson	
10	Usher	
10	Mary J. Blige	
9	Maxwell	
9	Kem	
9	Bruno Mars	
8	H.E.R	
8	Chris Brown	

=== Most top-tens ===
Number of Singles	Artist	Source
28	Mary J. Blige	
24	Alicia Keys	
20	Toni Braxton	
18	Tank	
17	Charlie Wilson	
16	Usher	
16	Kem	
16	Maxwell	
12	Bruno Mars	
10	Chris Brown	

=== Songs with most total weeks in the top ten ===
Weeks	Song	Artist	Years	Source
63	"Think About You"	Luther Vandross	2004–05	
62	"Love Calls"	Kem	2003–04	
62	"Lifetime"	Maxwell	2001–02	
53	"Can't Let Go"	Anthony Hamilton	2006–07	
50	"Find Myself in You"	Brian McKnight	2006–07	
49	"Shame"	Tyrese	2015–16	
49	"Earned It"	The Weeknd	2015–16	
49	"Adorn"	Miguel	2012–13	
46	"When We"	Tank	2017–18	
46	"That's What I Like"	Bruno Mars	2017–18	

=== Artists to collect number-one singles in three or more consecutive decades ===
Artist	Decades	Source
Toni Braxton	1990s, 2000s, 2010s, 2020s	
Mary J. Blige	1990s, 2000s, 2010s, 2020s	
Maxwell	1990s, 2000s, 2010s, 2020s	
Michael Jackson	1990s, 2000s, 2010s	
R. Kelly	1990s, 2000s, 2010s	
Anita Baker	1990s, 2000s, 2010s	
Alicia Keys	2000s, 2010s, 2020s	
Charlie Wilson	2000s, 2010s, 2020s	
Kem	2000s, 2010s, 2020s	
Tank	2000s, 2010s, 2020s	
Usher	2000s, 2010s, 2020s	

== See also ==
- R&B/Hip-Hop Airplay
