= JP (album) =

Studio album by Jesse Powell
- Released: March 27, 2001
- Genre: R&B
- Length: 54:19
- Labels: Silas; MCA
- Producers: Armando Colon; Shep Crawford; Tip Green; K-Fam; Randy Jackson; Fred Jerkins III; Jesse Powell; Damon Thomas; Tim & Bob; Curtis "Fitz" Williams

Jesse Powell chronology
'Bout It (1998)	JP (2001)	Jesse (2003)

JP is the third studio album by American singer Jesse Powell. It was released by Silas Records and MCA Records on March 27, 2001 in the United States.

== Critical reception ==
Professional ratings
Review scores
Source	Rating
AllMusic	3/5 stars
Vibe	3/5 stars

Allmusic editor Alex Henderson found that Powell continues "to improve and grow. It isn't that JP is a departure from his two previous albums, Jesse Powell (1995) and 'Bout It (1998) – Powell's specialty is still romantic urban contemporary, and even though a few of the tunes are mildly funky, ballads and slow jams are what ultimately define JP. The thing that makes JP a step forward for the neo-soulster is the quality of the writing [..,] Powell, however, has genuine talent. The Midwesterner has an impressive range (four octaves, to be exact), and his attractive phrasing sometimes reminds you of former Klique vocalist Howard Huntsberry. Again, JP isn't a masterpiece, but it's an enjoyable step forward for Powell."

== Track listing ==
JP — Standard edition
No.	Title	Writer(s)	Producer(s)	Length
1.	"It'll Take The World"	Curtis Williams; Vincent Herbert	Williams; Randy Jackson^{[a]}	3:42
2.	"If I"	Damon Thomas; Jesse Powell; Tamara Jordan	Thomas; J. Powell^{[a]}	4:01
3.	"I'm Leaving" (with Trina Powell)	J. Powell; Kenneth Hickson; Nicole Wray; Jordan; T. Powell; Ken "K-Fam" Fambro; Tip Green	Fambro; Tip Green^{[a]}	4:38
4.	"Go Upstairs"	Cassie Bonner	Williams; Jackson^{[a]}	5:27
5.	"I Didn't Realize"	Shep Crawford; Dre Allen; Marc Nelson; Montell Jordan	Crawford	4:29
6.	"I'd Rather Be Alone"	Bob Robinson; J. Powell; Jordan; Tim Kelley	Tim & Bob	4:18
7.	"Invisible Man"	Armando Colon; J. Powell	Colon	4:35
8.	"After We Make Love"	Fred Jerkins III; J. Powell	Jerkins	4:14
9.	"Can't Take It"	Robinson; Kelley	Tim & Bob	4:12
10.	"Take My Breath Away"	Thomas; J. Powell	Thomas; J. Powell^{[a]}	4:39
11.	"On Your Mind"	J. Powell; T. Powell	J. Powell	3:38
12.	"Something in the Past"	Al Hudson; Al Perkins; Cuba Gregory	J. Powell	6:26

Japanese bonus tracks
No.	Title	Writer(s)	Producer(s)	Length
13.	"You"	Carl Roland; Powell	Roland; Michael Stokes; Powell^{[a]}	5:18
14.	"You Should Know"	Dwight Sills; London Jones	Sills; L.D.J.	4:22
15.	"Ex-Girlfriend"	J. Powell	J. Powell	4:30

Notes

- ^{^a} denotes co-producer

== Charts ==
Chart (2001)	Peak position
US Billboard 200	71
US Top R&B/Hip-Hop Albums (Billboard)	18
