= Laney Stewart =

Musical artist (born 1966)

- Born: Philip Lane Stewart II; January 10, 1966 (age 60); Chicago, Illinois, U.S.
- Genres: R&B, pop, hip hop, house, electronic
- Occupations: Record producer, songwriter, publisher, manager
- Years active: 1978–present
- Labels: Redzone Entertainment, Morningside Trail Music, Groove Asylum Music, Famous Music, Peer Music, Universal Music Publishing Group, Stewart Music Group, The Sharpshootaz

Laney Stewart (born January 10, 1966) is an American songwriter, music producer, musician, music publisher, music executive, manager and youth mentor. He has written, produced and published hits for some of the biggest names in R&B, hip hop and pop music over the past three decades.

== Early life ==
Philip Lane Stewart II was born in 1966 in the South Side suburbs of Chicago, Illinois. His mother, Mary Ann Stewart, was a singer who had sung backgrounds for the Ohio Players, Curtis Mayfield and Aretha Franklin. His uncle, Morris "Butch" Stewart, was a musician and producer.

By age nine, Stewart had taught himself to play piano and drums. In Chicago's booming advertising industry he started singing on jingles at the age of 12, and began writing and composing jingles as a teenager. By age 15 he had his first commercially released songs on CBS Records with Ramsey Lewis's "This Ain't No Fantasy." At the age of 16 he became a regular in the burgeoning Chicago underground house music scene, and was one of the early house producers, producing songs for Arrogance such as "Crazy," which was released on DJ International Records in 1986.

He began working as a session musician with his uncle, Wayne Stewart (drummer), Tony Brown (bassist), and with Patrick Leonard, known for his work with Madonna, who became his most significant keyboard influence. At age 18, Stewart and partner Kenneth Hale formed their own jingle company, Minute Men, composing popular spots for Bud Light, McDonald's and Coca-Cola. They became the "go to" guys for urban-based spots for advertising companies such as the Burrell ad agency and DDB Needham, and they won an award for their work on the California Lottery ad campaign. Stewart was working House clubs at night and jingle sessions and meetings with ad executives by day.

== 1988 to 1998 ==
In 1988, with help from ad executive and author Michelle McKinney Hammond, Stewart signed his first publishing deal with Famous Music (now Sony/ATV Music Publishing). He worked with songwriting partner Tony Haynes on a string of placements and upgraded his deal to joint venture with Famous Music. He decided to focus his career on working with recording artists instead of jingles. In 1990, he and Haynes formed The Groove Asylum, and worked in the studio with Jimmy Jam and Terry Lewis, who influenced Stewart's songwriting and production style. Stewart co-produced songs with Jimmy Jam and Terry Lewis and worked with well-known recording artists. He signed a group of young writers, his younger brother, Tricky Stewart, cousin Kuk Harrell and Sean Hall, to his production company. His other younger brother, Mark E. Stewart, joined the company on the business side.

Stewart's next influence was MCA Records executive, Louil Silas Jr. Stewart worked with executives like Sylvia Rhone, Benny Medina and Quincy Jones on a run of successful songs, including "Never Let Them See You Sweat" by Go West, which was featured in White Men Can't Jump, and "Candlelight and You" by Keith Washington featuring Chante Moore, which was featured in House Party 2.

In 1992, Stewart relocated his company from Chicago to Los Angeles, CA. He and his brothers Tricky and Mark become founding partners in RedZone Entertainment in 1994.

In 1996, Stewart entered into a publishing deal and writing/production relationship with Kenneth "Babyface" Edmonds and his Edmonds Music Publishing company. This relationship led to him working with Madonna, Shanice, and Tony! Toni! Toné! He wrote and produced songs for the feature film Soul Food, and wrote and produced the top 10 hit "Last Nights Letter" for K-Ci & JoJo’s Quadruple platinum album Love Always.

== Redzone and Atlanta ==
In 1999, Stewart moved to Atlanta GA and joined his brothers as a partner in RedZone Entertainment and Triangle Sound Studios. RedZone helped to put Atlanta on the map as a music city, with hits like Blu Cantrell's "Hit ‘Em Up Style," Sole's "4,5,6", TLC's "No Scrubs", Toni Braxton's "Love Me Some Him," and Destiny's Child's "Bills, Bills, Bills." Stewart took over as president of RedZone, overseeing the day-to-day operations of the company and keeping it active. Hit songwriter Ester Dean joined Redzone's publishing side. Stewart continued to write and produce hit songs, including, # 1 A.C. smash "Without You" by Charlie Wilson, and "Everything", which appears on multi-platinum selling B2K’s Pandemonium and Greatest Hits albums.

== Publisher ==
In his role as publisher, Stewart worked with the writers, developing their skills and building an extensive catalog. He mentored "Tricky" Stewart, Kuk Harrell and Sean Hall, passing on the secrets of consistent hitmaking that he had learned from Jam & Lewis and Babyface and others. He published songs by Britney Spears, Usher, Pink, Sisqo, Toni Braxton, Tyrese, and the 1999 ASCAP Rap song of the year, "Who Dat" by JT Money, which reached #5 on the Billboard pop charts. One of the biggest R&B tracks in the catalog was "I Love Me Some Him" from Toni Braxton's "Secrets" album, which went 8 x Platinum. "Me Against The Music", a duet of Britney Spears and Madonna, peaked at #1 on the Billboard Hot Dance Club Songs chart, was featured in an episode of Fox's "Glee." Pink's "Can't Take Me Home", and added a double platinum plaque to Stewart's collection.

Other pop hits included "Case of the Ex" by Mýa, which peaked at number 2 in its 16th week on the Billboard Hot 100 chart and at #1 on Billboard's R&B chart. It spent three weeks at number 2 and 29 consecutive weeks on the Billboard Hot 100 chart, and was an international success. In 1999 there was 3LW’s "No More"; in 2001 B2K’s premier smash "Uh-Huh," the number 1 selling single in the US that year.

== The-Dream and Morningside Trail Music ==
Stewart entered into another publishing joint venture with Peer Music, forming Morningside Trail Music in 2003. He discovered and signed writer/producer Terius "The-Dream" Nash, and Nash and Stewart's first studio work resulted in the song "Everything," which appeared on B2K's album. Under Stewart's tutelage, Nash developed into an award-winning writer/producer and recording artist, with hits like "Shawty is the S*^!" and "Falsetto." Stewart introduced Nash to his brother Tricky and they wrote hits which included Rihanna's "Umbrella," J. Holiday's "Bed" and "Suffocate," Mariah Carey's "Touch My Body," Usher's "Moving Mountains," Mary J. Blige's "Just Fine," Justin Bieber's "Baby," and Beyoncé's "Single Ladies."

== 2005 to present ==
In 2005, Stewart took a break after learning that he was suffering from kidney cancer. In 2009, he and his wife formed Stewart Music Group, which combined publishing, production and management. In 2010 he received a transplant kidney from his wife. While still in hospital recovering from surgery, he finalized a deal for a joint venture with Universal Music Publishing Group, the largest music publishing company in the world. He developed a new publishing catalog under Music Gallery. A new writing/production team, "The SharpShootaz", was his first signing. Each writer in The Sharpshootaz was chosen by Stewart, including Alex Jacke, Romika Faniel, Derek Yopp, Andrew Kim and Sidney Miller. In late 2011 The Sharpshootaz produced several songs for Jesse McCartney, including "Out Of Words," which was leaked to the internet in July 2012. On July 9, 2012, Stewart and The Sharpshootaz released an Alex Jacke EP called "D.F.M." Stewart Music Group consisted of Music Gallery/UMPG Publishing, "The System" Management and Consulting, and LS Productions.

== Personal life ==
Stewart lives in Los Angeles, California, and is married to Khaila Stewart. They have three children: Jordan, Clarke and Christopher. Stewart and his wife are involved in research at UCLA for kidney disease and living donor transplants.

== Discography as songwriter and producer ==
Year	Artist	Album	Label	Songs worked on	Notes
1983	Kitty Haywood	-	Lance Records	"Givin It Up" (single)	
1983	Kitty Haywood	-	Lance Records	"Could I Be Dreamin" (single)	
1986	Arrogance	-	DJ International Records	"Crazy" (single)	
1990	Patrick O'Hearn	Mix Up	Private Music	"Journey To Yoroba (Laney Stewart Remix)"	
1991	Altitude	-	Bahia Entertainment	"Work It (Like A) 9 To 5" (single)	
1991	Louis Price	Louis Price	Motown	"Flesh & Blood"	
1991	Nicki Richards	Naked (To The World)	Atlantic	"Fire's Burning", "What's Going On", "Dirty Job"	
1991	Karyn White	Ritual of Love	Warner	"How I Want You", "Walking the Dog", "Beside You"	
1991	Keith Washington	Make Time for Love	Qwest/Warner	"When You Love Somebody", "Ready, Willing, & Able"	
1992	Chanté Moore	Precious	MCA	"Candlelight & You", "Without Your Love"	
1992	Sue Ann Carwell	Pain Killer	MCA	"Sex or Love", "7 Days, 7 Nights"	
1992	Jason Weaver	The Jacksons: An American Dream soundtrack	Motown	"I Wanna Be Where You Are"	
1993	Go West	Aces and Kings – The Best of Go West	Chrysalis/EMI USA	"Never Let Them See You Sweat"	This song appeared on the White Men Can't Jump soundtrack
1993	Regina Belle	-	Columbia	"The Deeper I Love" (single)	
1993	Darnell Owens	-	MCA	"Since You Went Away" (single)	
1993	Aaron Hall	The Truth	Silas/MCA	"Let's Make Love", "Until I Found You", "Freaky", "Pick Up the Phone"	
1994	Chanté Moore	A Love Supreme	MCA	"Old School Lovin'", "Who Do I Turn To"	
1994	Ebony Vibe Everlasting	Good Life	MCA	"Grove of Love", "Thinkin'", "Good Life"	
1995	The Whispers	Toast to the Ladies	Capitol	"Come On Home"	
1995	IV Xample	For Example	MCA	"From The Fool"	
1996	Jesse Powell	-	Silas	"All I Need" (single)	
1997	Sam Salter	It's On Tonight	LaFace	"After 12 Before 6", "There You Are", "Every Time a Car Drives By", "One My Heart", "I Love You Both", "It Took A Song"	
1997	Tony! Toni! Toné!	Hits	Mercury	"Boys and Girls"	"Boys and Girls" also appeared on the Soul Food soundtrack
1997	K-Ci & JoJo	Love Always	MCA	"Last Night's Letter"	
1999	Coko	Hot Coko	RCA	"This Ain't Love"	
1999	The Winans Phase 2	We Got Next	Myrrh	"Everyday Away"	
1999	Billy Crawford	Billy Crawford	V2	"I Wish", "Someone Like You", "If It's Alright"	
1999	Shanice	Shanice	LaFace	"Fly Away"	
1999	Ideal	Ideal	Virgin	"I Don't Mind"	
2000	Kandi	Hey Kandi...	Columbia	"Just So You Know"	
2000	Chanté Moore	Exposed	MCA	"Bitter", "Train of Thought", "Why Am I Lonely"	
2000	Charlie Wilson	Bridging the Gap	Interscope	"Without You", "Come Back My Way", "Charlie's Angels", "Can I Take You Home"	
2001	Her Sanity	Xclusive	Universal	"Can I Be Sure"	
2001	Blu Cantrell	So Blu	Arista	"10,000 Times", "It's Alright"	
2002	Snow	Two Hands Clapping	Virgin	"Legal", "Stay Ballin'"	
2002	B2K	Pandemonium!	Epic	"Everything"	"Everything" also appears on B2K Greatest Hits; the song peaked at #2 on Billboard 200
2004	Billy Crawford	Big City	V2	"Bright Lights"	Certified Gold
2004	Chanté Moore	Millennium Collection	Geffen	"Candlelight & You", "Old School Lovin'", "Train of Thought"	
2005	Shawn Desman	Back for More	UOMO and Sony BMG	"Ooh"	
2012	Alex Jacke	D.F.M.		"One Thing", "Callin For You", "Nobody's Perfect", "Enjoy the Ride", "All She Wrote", "Days Of Our Lives"	D.F.M. Deluxe (2013) also included the songs "No Hands", "Love To Love Ya", "We Should Have Sex", and "Pure Perfection"
2023	Usher	-		"Boyfriend" (single)	
	Honey	-		"More Than Love" (single)	
