= Gloria (Enchantment song) =

1976 single by Enchantment

Single by Enchantment

from the album Enchantment
- B-side: "Dance to the Music"
- Released: 1976
- Genre: R&B
- Length: 5:38 (album version); 3:28 (single edit)
- Label: Roadshow; United Artists
- Songwriter(s): Emanuel "E.J." Johnson; Michael Stokes
- Producer(s): Michael Stokes

Enchantment singles chronology
| "Call on Me" (1975) | "Gloria" (1976) | "Come On and Ride" (1976) |

"Gloria" is a song performed by American R&B group Enchantment, issued as the second single from the group's eponymous debut album. It was written by lead singer Emanuel Johnson with frequent collaborator Michael Stokes; and was produced by Stokes. The song was the group's biggest hit on the Billboard Hot 100, peaking at #25 in 1977.

== Chart performance ==
| Chart (1977) | Peak position |
|---|---|
| US Billboard Hot 100 | 25 |
| US R&B Singles (Billboard) | 5 |

== Jesse Powell version ==
"Gloria"

Single by Jesse Powell

from the album Jesse Powell
- B-side: "All I Need"
- Released: August 27, 1996
- Genre: R&B
- Length: 4:45 (album version); 3:40 (single edit)
- Label: Silas
- Songwriter(s): Emanuel "E.J." Johnson; Michael Stokes
- Producer(s): Michael Stokes

Jesse Powell singles chronology
| "All I Need" (1996) | "Gloria" (1996) | "I Like It" (1996) |

In 1996, American contemporary R&B singer Jesse Powell covered "Gloria" and included it on his eponymous debut album. The album features the song in a medley with another Enchantment song, "It's You That I Need", and is titled "The Enchantment Medley: Gloria/It's You That I Need", but only "Gloria" was released as a single. Powell's version was also produced by Michael Stokes; and it peaked at #51 on the Billboard R&B chart.

=== Music video ===
The official music video for the song was directed by Lionel C. Martin.

=== Chart performance ===
| Chart (1996) | Peak position |
|---|---|
| US Hot R&B/Hip-Hop Singles & Tracks (Billboard) | 51 |
