= All I Need (Jesse Powell song) =

1996 single by Jesse Powell

Single by Jesse Powell

from the album Jesse Powell
- Released: March 5, 1996
- Recorded: 1995
- Genre: R&B
- Length: 4:59 (album version); 4:03 (single edit)
- Label: Silas
- Songwriter(s): Jesse Powell; Laney Stewart; Sam Salter
- Producer(s): Laney Stewart

Jesse Powell singles chronology
"All I Need" (1996)	"Gloria" (1996)

"All I Need" is the debut single by Jesse Powell, released in 1996 from his eponymous debut album. The song was written by Powell, Sam Salter and Laney Stewart; and was produced by Stewart. It peaked at No. 32 on the Billboard R&B chart in 1996.

== Chart performance ==
Chart (1996)	Peak position
US Hot R&B/Hip-Hop Singles & Tracks (Billboard)	32
