= Jack Brokensha =

Australian-born American jazz vibraphonist

John Joseph "Jack" Brokensha (5 January 1926 – 28 October 2010) was an Australian-born American jazz vibraphonist, known for his work with the Australian Jazz Quartet and Motown Records.

== Biography ==
Brokensha was born in Nailsworth, South Australia. He studied percussion under his father, and played xylophone in vaudeville shows and on radio. He played with the Australian Symphony Orchestra during 1942–44, and played in a band in the Air Force in 1944–46.

Forming his own group, he played in Melbourne in 1947–48, Sydney in 1949–50, Brisbane later in 1950, and Adelaide in 1951. In 1953 he moved to Windsor, Ontario, Canada with Australian pianist Bryce Rohde; they formed the Australian Jazz Quartet the following year with Australian bassoonist/saxophonist Errol Buddle and American saxophonist/flutist/bassist Dick Healey. This ensemble (sometimes recording as a quintet or sextet) toured together until 1958 after a tour of Australia.

Brokensha moved to Detroit, Michigan, where he was hired by Berry Gordy of Motown Records as a percussionist, becoming one of the few white members of Motown's Hitsville U.S.A. recording studio's house band, The Funk Brothers. He was given the nickname "White Jack", to distinguish him from Jack Ashford, an African American percussionist nicknamed "Black Jack". Brokensha played percussion (mainly vibraphone) on hundreds of records, though Motown routinely did not credit their session musicians until 1971, with the highly acclaimed Marvin Gaye album What's Going On (on which Brokensha played).

In the 1970s he ran a steakhouse from a converted house on Lothrop Street adjacent to the Fisher Building and very close to Berry Gordy’s Hitsville USA. The club was called "Brokensha's", It was a relatively small club with good food and music. He was occasionally accompanied by his friend and fellow Detroit resident, pianist Bess Bonnier. Teenage jazz guitarist Earl Klugh made his first club appearance at Brokensha's in 1970, playing solo as well as with Jack Brokensha’s Quintet.

Following further tours in Australia with Sammy Davis Jr. and Stan Freberg, Brokensha founded his own music production company. He did a session with Art Mardigan in 1963, and after this became more active in disc jockeying and writing music for television. He recorded as a leader again in 1980 and continued to lead his own group well into the 1990s.

He is listed as "Music Direction" Jack Brokensha on a 45 produced by Robert Nagy. 1976. Side 1: Ballad of Jimmy Hoffa. (Gerald Provencal - Feliz Resnick) Tom Lee.Side 2: On the Road (tom Lee) Tom Lee. Parks Publ. Ltd. ASCAP.

Brokensha served as musical director for the annual Ford Motor Company New Car Announcement Show, produced by Wilding Picture Productions and later Maritz for over a decade.

Brokensha died in Sarasota, Florida, of complications from congestive heart failure, aged 84.

== Discography ==
=== As leader ===
- And Then I Said (Savoy, 1963)
- Holiday Innovations (US Steel, 1968)
- Boutique (AEM Record Group, 1993)
- XMazz (AEM, 1993)

With the Australian Jazz Quartet

- Australian Jazz Quartet (Bethlehem, 1955)
- The Australian Jazz Quartet (Bethlehem, 1955)
- Australian Jazz Quartet/Quintet (Bethlehem, 1956)
- The Australian Jazz Quintet at the Varsity Drag (Bethlehem, 1956)
- Australian Jazz Quintet Plus One: Jazz in D Minor (Bethlehem, 1957)
- Rodgers & Hammerstein (Bethlehem, 1957)
- Free Style (Bethlehem, 1958)
- Three Penny Opera (Bethlehem, 1958)
- Reunion! Recorded Live - Adelaide Town Hall (AEM, 1994)

=== As sideman ===
With The Dramatics

- Anytime, Anyplace (ABC, 1979)

With Enchantment

- Enchantment (United Artists, 1976)
- Once Upon a Dream (United Artists, 1977)
- Journey to the Land Of... Enchantment (Roadshow, 1979)

With The Floaters

- Magic (MCA Records, 1978)

With Marvin Gaye

- What's Going On (Motown Records, 1971)

With Eddie Kendricks

- Slick (Tamla, 1977)

With The Supremes

- Floy Joy (Motown, 1972)

With The Temptations

- Puzzle People (Gordy, 1969)
- Psychedelic Shack (Gordy, 1970)
- Solid Rock (Gordy, 1972)
- All Directions (Gordy, 1972)
- Masterpiece (Gordy, 1973)

With The Undisputed Truth

- Face to Face with the Truth (Gordy, 1972)
- Law of the Land (Gordy, 1973)
