= Jesse Powell (album) =

Studio album by Jesse Powell
- Released: March 12, 1996
- Recorded: 1995
- Genre: R&B
- Length: 69:08
- Labels: Silas; MCA
- Producers: Buster and Shavoni; Keri Lewis; Poke & Tone; Carl Roland; Daryl Simmons; Laney Stewart; Michael Stokes; Stokley

Jesse Powell chronology
Jesse Powell (1996)	'Bout It (1998)

Singles from Jesse Powell
- 1. "All I Need" Released: March 5, 1996; 2. "Gloria" Released: August 27, 1996; 3. "I Like It" Released: 1996

Jesse Powell is the debut studio album by American R&B singer Jesse Powell. It was released by Silas Records on March 12, 1996 in the United States.

== Critical reception ==
Professional ratings
Review scores
Source	Rating
Allmusic	3/5 stars

Allmusic editor Craig Lytle found that "the CD is mixed with midtempo new jack swing rhythms and laid-back ballads that all sound consistent with each other. As Powell's vocals mature, his delivery should become smoother."

== Track listing ==
Jesse Powell — Standard edition
No.	Title	Writer(s)	Producer(s)	Length
1.	"Looking for Love"	Gordon Chambers; Jesse Powell; Terri Robinson	Tone	3:59
2.	"All I Need"	Danny Webster; Powell; Mark Adams; Phillip L. Stewart II; Mark Hicks; Raye Turner; Samuel Salter; Starleana Young; Steve Arrington; Thabiso Nkhereanye	Laney Stewart	4:59
3.	"Spend the Night (It's Alright)"	Chris Stokes; Isaac Hayes; Powell; P. Stewart	L. Stewart	4:40
4.	"I Like"	Chambers; Kenneth Stover	Poke & Tone	4:35
5.	"You Don't Know"	Daryl Simmons; Sherry Simmons	D. Simmons	5:02
6.	"You"	Carl Roland; Powell	Roland	5:16
7.	"The Enchantment Medley" ("Gloria"/"It's You That I Need")	Michael Stokes; Verdell Lanier; Emanuel Johnson	Stokes	7:18
8.	"Ooh, I Like It"	Gloria Stewart; Thaddis L. Harrell, Jr.; Powell; P. Stewart	L. Stewart	5:16
9.	"Let Go"	D. Simmons	D. Simmons	4:47
10.	"If You Like What You See" (featuring Catrina Powell)	Powell; Louis Brown III; Scott Parker	Buster and Shavoni	5:28
11.	"All Alone"	Keri Lewis; Stokley Williams	Lewis; Stokley	5:39
12.	"I Will Be Loving You"	D. Simmons	D. Simmons	7:05
13.	"Is It Over"	Roland	Roland	5:04

Sample credits

- "All I Need" contains samples from 1979's "Just a Touch of Love" by Slave.
- "Spend the Night (It's Alright)" contains samples from "Do Your Thing" by Isaac Hayes.
- "I Like" contains samples from 1980's "I'm Back for More" by Al Johnson and Jean Carne.
- "Gloria" contains samples from 1976's "Gloria" and 1978's "It's You That I Need" by Enchantment.

== Personnel ==
- Judi Acosta-Stewart – Project Coordinator
- Gerald Albright – saxophone
- Craig Burbidge – mixing
- Buster – producer, programming
- Gordon Chambers – Vocal Arrangement, backing vocals
- Kevin "KD" Davis – mixing
- John Frye – assistant engineer
- Thom "TK" Kidd – engineer
- Keri Lewis – arranger, drum programming, Fiddle, Keyboards, Producer
- Lisa Michelle – stylist
- Kevin Lively – assistant engineer
- Kevin Parker – assistant engineer
- Catrina Powell – backing vocals
- Jacob Powell – backing vocals
- Jesse Powell – Primary Artist, Vocal Arrangement, backing vocals
- Tamara Powell – backing vocals
- Ricky K. – bass
- Timothy Christian Riley – keyboards
- Carl Roland – guitar, multi-instruments, producer, programming
- Greg Royal – editing
- Shavoni – producer, programming
- Louis Silas, Jr. – executive producer
- Rea Ann Silva – make-up
- Daryl Simmons – drum programming, keyboards, producer, Vocal Arrangement
- Ivy Skoff – Project Coordinator
- Alvin Speights – mixing
- Ralph Stacy – bass
- Laney Stewart – engineer, producer, programming, Rhythm Arrangements, Sequencing, Vocal Arrangement
- Michael Stokes – arranger, engineer, mixing, producer, programming
- Tone – drum programming, mixing, producer
- Richard Travali – mixing
- Ilene Weingard – Art Direction, Design
- Emerald Williams – backing vocals
- Stokley Williams – drums, backing vocals

== Charts ==
Chart (1996)	Peak position
US Heatseekers Albums (Billboard)	32
US Top R&B/Hip-Hop Albums (Billboard)	35
