= 20th Century Masters – The Millennium Collection: The Best of Chanté Moore =

Compilation album by Chanté Moore
- Released: May 18, 2004
- Recorded: 1992 – 1999
- Genre: R&B; soul
- Length: 62:01
- Label: Geffen; Universal Music Group
- Producer: Simon Law; Laney Stewart; Jimmy Jam and Terry Lewis; Babyface; Vassal Benford

Chanté Moore chronology
Things That Lovers Do (2003)	20th Century Masters – The Millennium Collection: The Best of Chanté Moore (2004)	Uncovered/Covered (2006)

20th Century Masters – The Millennium Collection: The Best of Chanté Moore is a compilation album by American R&B/soul artist Chanté Moore. The album was released in May 2004 by Geffen Records and consists of Moore's songs released between 1992 and 1999 on both Silas and MCA records. The album is part of the 20th Century Masters – The Millennium Collection album series.

== Background ==
20th Century Masters – The Millennium Collection contains twelve tracks of original material Chanté Moore had recorded for the record labels Silas/MCA between 1992 and 2000. The album features Moore's R&B hit singles "Love's Taken Over", "It's Alright" and the US Billboard Hot 100 top ten hit "Chanté's Got a Man". The compilation album also features the track "I Love You", a duet with R&B singer Keith Washington taken from his 1998 album KW.

== Track listing ==
No.	Title	Writer(s)	Original album	Length
1.	"Old School Lovin'"	Chanté Moore; Gloria Stewart; Laney Stewart; Mark Stewart; Thaddis Harrell	A Love Supreme	5:00
2.	"Love's Taken Over"	Moore; Simon Law	Precious	6:36
3.	"Who Do I Turn To?"	Moore; Phillip L. Stewart II; Tony Hayes	Precious	4:44
4.	"It's Alright"	Moore; Vassal Benford	Precious	5:37
5.	"This Time"	Moore; Lee Hamblin; Law	A Love Supreme	6:00
6.	"I'm What You Need"	Donald Parks; Emanuel Officer; John Howcott	A Love Supreme	5:00
7.	"My Special Perfect One"	Moore; Harvey Brough; Ross Anderson; Law	A Love Suprem	5:27
8.	"Wey U"	Babyface	Waiting to Exhale: Soundtrack	4:28
9.	"I Love You" (duet with Keith Washington)	Mark J. Fiest; Shanice	KW	5:54
10.	"Train of Thought"	Jackson; Harris, Lewis; David Romani; Wayne Garfield; Mauro Malavasi	Exposed	4:32
11.	"This Moment Is Mine"	Jackson; Jimmy Jam; Terry Lewis	This Moment Is Mine	4:58
12.	"Chanté's Got a Man"	Moore; Jimmy Jam; Terry Lewis	This Moment Is Mine	4:24
