= 'Bout It =

Studio album by Jesse Powell
- Released: September 8, 1998
- Genre: R&B
- Length: 46:02
- Labels: Silas; MCA
- Producers: Louis Silas Jr. (exec.); Felipe Darrell (exec.); Joey Elias; Mark J. Feist; Ashley Ingram; Eric Jackson; Fred Jerkins III; Rodney Jerkins; Jon-John; L.D.J.; Carl Roland; Dwight Sills; Smoove; Michael Stokes; Darryl "88" Young

Jesse Powell chronology
Jesse Powell (1996)	'Bout It (1998)	JP (2001)

Singles from 'Bout It
- 1. "I Wasn't with It" Released: July 28, 1998; 2. "You" Released: February 2, 1999; 3. "'Bout It, 'Bout It" Released: 1999

'Bout It is the second studio album by American singer Jesse Powell. It was released by Silas Records on September 8, 1998 in the United States. It was Powell's first album to chart on the US Billboard 200, peaking at number 63. For sales in excess of 700,000 copies, 'Bout It was certified gold by the Recording Industry Association of America (RIAA) on June 8, 1999. Three singles were released from the album, including "I Wasn't with It", "You" and "'Bout It, 'Bout It". "You" is Powell's only hit to date on the US Billboard Hot 100, peaking at number 10 in 1999. Bout It was eventually certified Platinum by the RIAA in mid 2001 and has sold over two million copies worldwide being his most successful record of his career.

== Critical reception ==
Professional ratings
Review scores
Source	Rating
AllMusic	2.5/5 stars

Allmusic editor Craig Lytle found that 'Bout It "isn't a gem but is generally decent. The singer doesn't incorporate an abundance of rapping (something many jeep soulsters were doing), but his producers do favor a very hip-hop-ish production style on "Up and Down," "I Wasn't with It," and other selections. Powell doesn't provide anything for the dancefloor – most of the time, he gets into a comfortable medium-tempo groove, whether he's being romantic or overtly sexual. Not a remarkable CD, but competent and usually likable."

== Track listing ==
'Bout It — Standard edition
No.	Title	Writer(s)	Producer(s)	Length
1.	"I Wasn't with It"	Eric Jackson; Joey Elias; Jonathon Robinson	Jackson; Elias; Jon-John	4:21
2.	"I Can Tell"	Darryl "88" Young; John Sebastian; Kenny "Smoove" Kornegay; Mark Sebastian; Sam Salter; Steve Boone; Thabiso Nkhereanye	Kornegay; Young^{[a]}	4:42
3.	"She Wasn't Last Night"	Fred Jerkins III; Isaac Phillips; LaShawn Daniels; Rodney Jerkins; Tye-V Turman	R. Jerkins	5:02
4.	"'Bout It, 'Bout It"	Mark J. Feist	Feist	3:51
5.	"Are You Missin' My Love?"	F. Jerkins; Japhe Tejeda; Jesse Powell; Daniels	F. Jerkins	4:55
6.	"Up and Down"	F. Jerkins; Tejeda; Jerry Butler; Powell; Kenneth Gamble; Daniels; Leon Huff	F. Jerkins	4:46
7.	"You Should Know"	Dwight Sills; London Jones	Sills; L.D.J.	4:22
8.	"You're the One I Love"	Ashley Ingram; Powell; Rachel "Jehrome" Shepard	Ingram; Powell^{[a]}	4:17
9.	"You"	Carl Roland; Powell	Roland; Michael Stokes; Powell^{[a]}	5:18
10.	"I Wasn't with It (Remix)" (featuring Sauce Money)	Eric Jackson; Joey Elias; Jonathon Robinson	Jackson; Elias; Jon-John; Pete Rock^{[a]}	4:28

Notes

- ^{^a} denotes co-producer

== Personnel ==
- Gerald Albright – saxophone
- Carter Bradley – make-up
- James "Chip" Bunton – production coordination
- LaShawn Daniels – engineer, vocal producer
- Felipe Darrell – associate executive producer
- Kevin "KD" Davis – mixing
- Ken Deranteriasian – engineer
- Joey Elias – backing vocals, producer
- Paul "PE" Elliot – engineer
- Paul Erickson – engineer
- Mark J. Feist – producer, engineer, mixing
- Ben Garrison – mixing
- Jeff Gibbs – engineer
- Rawle Gittens – engineer
- Reno Greenfield – drum programming
- Susan Herndon – engineer
- Ashley Ingram – multi-instruments, producer
- Jhane Isaacs – stylist
- Eric Jackson – guitar
- Fred Jenkins III – multi-instruments, producer, mixing
- Rodney Jerkins – producer, mixing, vocal producer
- Jon-John – multi-instruments, producer
- Kenny "K-Smoove" Kornegay – producer
- L.D.J. – multi instruments, producer
- Tim "Flash" Mariner – engineer
- Manny Marroquin – engineer, mixing
- Meire Murakami – design
- Kenji Nakai – engineer, mixing
- Ashley Pigford – design
- Catrina Powell – backing vocals
- Jacob Powell – backing vocals
- Jesse Powell – vocals, backing vocals, producer
- Tamara Powell – backing vocals
- Chris Puram – mixing
- Jon-John Robinson – producer
- Pete Rock – producer, remixing
- Carl Roland – programming, multi-instruments, producer
- Sauce Money – rap
- Louis Silas Jr. – executive producer
- Dwight Sills – acoustic guitar, producer
- Dexter Simmons – mixing
- Michael Stokes – engineer, mixing, production supervisor
- Joe Warlick – assistant engineer, mixing assistant
- Emerald Williams – backing vocals
- Darryl Young – producer

== Charts ==
=== Weekly charts ===
Chart (1999)	Peak position
US Billboard 200	63
US Heatseekers Albums (Billboard)	1
US Top R&B/Hip-Hop Albums (Billboard)	15

=== Year-end charts ===
Chart (1999)	Position
US Top R&B/Hip-Hop Albums (Billboard)	53

== Certifications ==
Region	Certification	Certified units/sales
United States (RIAA)	Gold	500,000^{^}
^{^} Shipments figures based on certification alone.
