= I Wasn't with It =

Single by Jesse Powell

from the album 'Bout It
- B-side: "I Can Tell"
- Released: July 28, 1998
- Genre: R&B
- Length: 4:28 (album version); 3:58 (single edit)
- Label: Silas
- Songwriters: Eric Jackson; Joey Elias
- Producer: Jon-John Robinson

Jesse Powell singles chronology
"I Like It" (1996)	"I Wasn't with It" (1998)	"You" (1999)

Music video
- "I Wasn't with It" on YouTube

"I Wasn't with It" is a song performed by Jesse Powell. The song is the opening track from his second album 'Bout It and was issued as the album's first single. The song was his debut on the Billboard Hot 100, and it peaked at #85 in 1998.

== Music video ==
The official music video for the song was directed by Steve Willis.

== Chart performance ==
Chart (1998)	Peak position
US Billboard Hot 100	85
US Hot R&B/Hip-Hop Singles & Tracks (Billboard)	25
