= KW (album) =

Studio album by Keith Washington
- Released: March 10, 1998
- Genre: R&B
- Length: 61:59
- Label: Silas
- Producer: Rashad Coes; Terry Coffey; Mark J. Feist; Rob Fusari; Calvin Gaines; Vincent Herbert; Fred Jerkins III; Carsten Lindberg; Donnie Lyle; Marc Nelson; Louil Silas, Jr.; Joachim Svare; Keith Washington; Mark Wilson

Keith Washington chronology
You Make It Easy (1993)	KW (1998)

KW is the third studio album by American R&B vocalist Keith Washington, released on March 10, 1998, by Silas Records. His only album with the label, it reached number 27 on the US Top R&B/Hip-Hop Albums chart.

== Critical reception ==
Professional ratings
Review scores
Source	Rating
AllMusic	3/5 stars

In his review for AllMusic, editor Alex Henderson felt that "containing mostly ballads and slow jams, the CD is very much in the late '90s neo-soul vein – the production is high-tech and hip-hop-ish, but the singing is classic R&B. Washington often brings to mind Alexander O'Neal, and he also shows an awareness of Luther Vandross and Freddie Jackson. A few of the tracks are excellent [...] most of the other material, however, is decent, although not remarkable. But while KW isn't the all-out gem that Washington is quite capable of providing, it was still nice to see him recording again." Billboard found that with KW "Washington brings his no-nonsense ballads and think-on-it, midtempo tracks to the table [...] It will be interesting to see how [he] fares against such other balladeers as R. Kelly and Maxwell."

== Track listing ==
No.	Title	Writer(s)	Producer(s)	Length
1.	"I Warned You"	Fred Jerkins III; Japhe Tejeda; Keith Washington; LaShawn Daniels; Barry DeVorzon; Ward Chandler	Jerkins	5:15
2.	"No Matter"	Bill Withers; Dana Belle; Washington; Louil Silas, Jr.; Stan McKinney	Carsten Lindberg; Joachim Svare; Washington; Silas	4:35
3.	"I Don't Mind"	Marc Nelson; Rashad Coes	Nelson; Coes	4:20
4.	"Tell Me (Are You with It)"	Jerkins; Tejeda; Washington; Daniels	Jerkins	4:58
5.	"Bring It On"	Jerkins; Nelson	Jerkins	4:30
6.	"I Love You" (duet with Chanté Moore)	Mark J. Feist; Shanice Wilson	Feist	5:57
7.	"You Sure Love to Ball"	Marvin Gaye	Donnie Lyle; Washington	5:10
8.	"Long Ago"	Calvin Gaines; Herschel Boone; Washington; Mark Wilson; Rob Fusari; Vincent Herbert	Gaines; Wilson; Fusari; Herbert; Washington^{[a]}	4:34
9.	"I Can't Put You Down"	Lyle; Boone; Washington	Lyle; Washington	4:10
10.	"You Let Me Down"	Jerkins; Tejeda; Washington; Daniels	Jerkins	4:45
11.	"Smile"	Jerkins; Kelly Price	Jerkins	3:55
12.	"Only You"	Terry Coffey; Washington	Coffey	3:55
13.	"Bring It On" (Remix)	Jerkins; Washington; Nelson	Jerkins; Darkchild^{[b]}	5:40

Notes

- ^{^a} denotes co-producer
- ^{^b} denotes additional producer

== Charts ==
Chart (1998)	Peak position
US Billboard 200	125
US Top R&B/Hip-Hop Albums (Billboard)	26
