= Migration (Creative Source album) =

Studio album by Creative Source
- Released: 1974
- Recorded: 1974 at Record Plant, Los Angeles, California
- Genre: Soul, Funk
- Label: Sussex Records
- Producer: Michael Stokes

Creative Source chronology
Creative Source (1973)	Migration (1974)	Pass the Feelin' On (1975)

Professional ratings
Review scores
Source	Rating
Allmusic	2/5 stars

Migration is the second album by Los Angeles, California-based R&B group Creative Source. This was their last album on Sussex Records before moving onto Polydor Records in 1975.

== Track listing ==
1. "I'm Gonna Get There" - (Michael Stokes, Joe Thomas, Don Wyatt) 2:27
2. "Harlem" - (Bill Withers) 4:57
3. "I Just Can't See Myself Without You"- (Skip Scarborough) 7:30
4. "Keep On Movin'" - (Michael Stokes, Joe Thomas, Skip Scarborough) 2:35
5. "Migration" - (Michael Stokes, Joe Thomas) 4:22
6. "Corazon" - (Carole King) 4:41
7. "Let Me Be the One" - (Paul Williams, Roger Nichols) 3:27

== Personnel ==
- Clarence McDonald, Michael Stokes, Skip Scarborough - keyboards
- Melvin "Wah-Wah Watson" Ragin, Ray Parker Jr. - guitar
- James Jamerson - Bass
- Kenneth "Spider" Rice - drums
- Ralph Terrana - synthesizer
- John Tradel - horns
- Carl Austin - strings

== Charts ==
Chart (1974)	Peak position
Billboard Top Soul LPs	28
