= Enchantment (Enchantment album) =

Studio album by Enchantment
- Released: 1977
- Recorded: 1976 at Sound Suite, Detroit, Michigan; Hit Factory, New York City, New York
- Genre: Soul
- Labels: Roadshow Records, United Artists
- Producer: Michael Stokes

Enchantment chronology
Enchantment (1977)	Once Upon a Dream (1978)

Singles from Enchantment
- 1. "Come On and Ride" Released: June 1976; 2. "Gloria" Released: December 1976; 3. "Sunshine" Released: May 1977

Professional ratings
Review scores
Source	Rating
AllMusic	4/5 stars

Enchantment is the debut album recorded by Detroit, Michigan-based R&B group Enchantment, released in 1977 on the Roadshow /United Artists label. The album was remastered and reissued with bonus tracks in 2012 by Big Break Records.

== Chart performance ==
Enchantment reached number eleven on the Billboard R&B albums chart in 1977. The singles "Gloria" and "Sunshine", peaked at numbers five and three on the R&B singles chart, respectively.

== Track listing ==
All tracks are written by Michael Stokes and Emanuel Johnson.

Side one
No.	Title	Length
1.	"Hold On"	6:29
2.	"Gloria"	5:20
3.	"Dance to the Music"	4:00
4.	"Sexy Lady"	3:00

Side two
No.	Title	Length
5.	"Come On and Ride"	4:16
6.	"My Rose"	4:28
7.	"Sunshine"	4:40
8.	"Thank You Girl for Loving Me"	3:45

2012 remastered reissue bonus tracks
No.	Title	Length
9.	"Come On and Ride" (Single Version)	3:33
10.	"Hold On" (Single Version)	2:34
11.	"Gloria" (Single Version)	3:28
12.	"Dance to the Music" (Single Version)	3:27
13.	"Sunshine" (Single Version)	3:34
14.	"Hold On" (12" Disco Version)	6:51

== Personnel ==
- Eddie Willis, Elliott Randall, Jerry Friedman, John Tropea - Guitar
- Michael Stokes, Paul Griffin, Willie Hollis - Keyboards
- Alvin Taylor, Chuck Rainey, Rodrick Chandler - Bass guitar
- Allan Schwartzberg, Tony Robinson - Drums
- Jack Brokensha, Shaunard Williams - Percussion
- Carl Austin, The Detroit Symphony Orchestra, John Trudell - Strings, Horns

== Charts ==
Chart (1977)	Peak position
U.S. Billboard Top LPs	104
U.S. Billboard Top Soul LPs	11

Singles

Year	Single	Peak chart positions		
Year	Single	US	US R&B	US Dan
1976	"Come On and Ride"	—	67	37
1976	"Gloria"	25	5	—
1977	"Sunshine"	45	3	—
