= Kissing You =

Kissing You may refer to:

- "Kissing You" (Des'ree song), the theme song from the 1996 film Romeo + Juliet, and later covered by Beyoncé Knowles, Taylor Dayne and Stan Walker
- "Kissing You" (Girls' Generation song)
- "Kissing You" (Keith Washington song)
- "Kissin' You", a song by Total
- "Kissin U", a song by Miranda Cosgrove from Sparks Fly
