= Creative Source (album) =

Studio album by Creative Source
- Released: 1973
- Recorded: 1973 at G.M. Studios, Detroit, Michigan; Overdubs at Record Plant, Los Angeles, California
- Genre: Soul, Funk
- Label: Sussex Records
- Producer: Michael Stokes

Creative Source chronology
Creative Source (1973)	Migration (1974)

Professional ratings
Review scores
Source	Rating
Allmusic	3/5 stars

Creative Source is the self-titled debut album by Los Angeles, California based R&B group Creative Source. Released in 1973, this album charted at number twenty-one on the R&B albums chart in 1974. It includes the original version of "You Can't Hide Love" that Earth, Wind and Fire covered a couple years later in 1975.

== Track listing ==
1. "You Can't Hide Love" - (Skip Scarborough) 3:22
2. "Let Me in Your Life" - (Bill Withers) 3:03
3. "Lovesville" - (Michael Stokes, Joe Thomas) 3:58
4. "You're Too Good to Be True" - (Michael Stokes, Joe Thomas) 3:30
5. "Wild Flower" - (Doug Edwards, David Richardson) 4:39
6. "Magic Carpet Ride" - (Rushton Moreve, John Kay) 3:10
7. "Who Is He (And What Is He to You)?" - (Bill Withers, Stanley McKenny) 11:45
8. "Oh Love" - (Michael Stokes, Joe Thomas) 3:24

== Charts ==
Chart (1974)	Peak positions
Billboard Top LPs	152
Billboard Top Soul LPs	21

=== Singles ===
Year	Single	Chart positions	
Year	Single	US	US R&B
1973	"You Can't Hide Love"	114	48
1974	"Who Is He and What Is He to You"	69	21
1974	"You're Too Good to Be True"	108	88
