= Later Days =

American musical group

- Origin: Naples, Florida, United States
- Genres: Rock
- Years active: 2001–present
- Members: Mike Wassef; Derrick Peltz; John Faratzis; Paul Martello
- Past members: Josh Eaton; Robert Curtin; Chris Knific; Patrick Coleman
- Website: http://www.facebook.com/laterdaysrock

Later Days is an American rock band from Naples, Florida formed in 2001. The band consists of vocalist and guitarist Mike Wassef, guitarist John Faratzis, drummer Derrick "D-Rock" Peltz, and bassist Paul Martello.

== Early years ==
The band was formed by lead singer Mike Wassef in 2001 in Naples, FL. For the 3 years, they released numerous demos and played shows throughout South Florida, many with good friends and contemporaries Fake Problems. This period culminated with the release of "I've Got My Fingers Crossed, But I'm Not Holding My Breath" in 2003, which was recorded at Skylab Studios in Gainesville, FL and Produced by Maharamzeez and John Faratzis

== Catch This Epidemic... ==
In 2005 the band recorded with Incubus producer, Jim Wirt at 4th Street Studios in Santa Monica, California and Ameraycan/Paramount Studios in North Hollywood, California, releasing a five-song EP, featuring guest piano parts from Andrew McMahon of Something Corporate and Jack's Mannequin.

The band toured on this release for the next year, playing with acts like Black Light Burns, Horse the Band, Foxy Shazam, and Forever the Sickest Kids at places ranging from small venues to ones as big as the Masquerade in Atlanta, GA. In the Summer of 2005 the band was chosen to play on the Ernie Ball Stage of the Vans Warped Tour battling with who would become pop-punk contemporaries We The Kings at Vinoy Park in Tampa, Florida.

== I Heard They're Getting Huge ==
The band returned to the studio with Jim Wirt to record the follow-up "I Heard They're Getting Huge". Two of the tracks from the session, "Shake It" and "Everything", were then mixed by multi-platinum Grammy-nominated producer David Bendeth. The album was quickly chosen for sale at Hot Topic stores nationwide, and Alternative Press dubbed them "damn good in our book".

After this release, the Naples Daily News described Later Days as "writing and performing rock songs that would make party-boys Blink 182 envious." Soon after, CSTV selected Later Days from over 2,000 submissions as their top collegiate band and sent them to Reno, Nevada to perform at the Collegiate Nationals Musical Festival. While there, the band recorded an interview with skier Johnny Moseley for his show on Sirius Radio Channel 28 The Faction.

== Later Days Decisions ==
Instead of booking a normal support tour in dive bars and nightclubs, the band adopted Patrick Coleman to play bass and founded the motivational speaking campaign Later Days Decisions, in a move that has been described as "pop-punk Mother Teresa." The group teamed with SWAT and the Florida Department of Health to incorporate drummer Derrick Peltz's inspirational anti-substance abuse story into the setting of a rock concert. They took their act to middle schools across the state, receiving great reviews. The program is active and currently plays throughout the Greater Los Angeles area.

== Don't Forget the Name ==
In 2009, the group entered the studio with producer Steve Evetts, and in three months emerged with the break-out "Don't Forget the Name." They used their connections with Home Grown bassist Adam Lohrbach and News Years' Day singer Ashley Costello to bring her into the studio to record guest vocals. The band relocated to Los Angeles full-time to support it. Therecordrebellion.com called it a "crowd favorite" with "catchy riffs and lyrics" and an "upbeat tempo."

== Wango Tango & The Los Angeles Years ==
In January 2009, the band recruited Paul Martello to play bass. The foursome played multiple shows at The Canyon Club, El Rey Theatre, Whisky a Go Go, Troubador and a sold-out show at the Knitting Factory. In 2010, Los Angeles based radio station KIIS FM named Later Days the winner of their Taco Bell Breakout Star contest where they won $10,000 and a spot to play their annual Wango Tango concert. From a video submission Later Days was picked to perform in the semi-finals at Universal CityWalk and then went on to win the finals one week later. After their performance at Wango Tango, online music blog "I Am Pop Culture" featured them as a band to keep an eye out for calling them, "great entertainers" and "really exciting to watch on stage." Noted Upstate New York blogger Jeanie DiNapoli from Times Union (Albany) called their KIIS win "the big break they have been waiting for." Their single P.C.H. (Hustle This Place) is currently in rotation on KIIS.

On April 9, 2011, they garnered over 100,000 online votes to win the LA Kings Live Music Nights contest to become the first act to perform live music during the intermission of a Los Angeles Kings game. It marked the fourth time they played the Staples Center in less than a year.

== Television placement ==
In April 2011, television producers Bunim-Murray, creators of such reality shows as The Real World, placed the song "P.C.H (Hustle This Place)" as the theme for VH1's reality show Saddle Ranch. The song about the Pacific Coast Highway includes the chorus "Let's have fun tonight, let the cops come and pick a fight, we're gonna hustle this place until everybody knows our name." The show is based on the Sunset Strip restaurant called Saddle Ranch in Hollywood, California. Ex's Bestfriend, off their 2009 release Don't Forget The Name, was featured in the Warped Tour episode of The Real World: San Diego. There have been continuous placements off Later Days album "Don't Forget The Name" featured on Oxygen network's TV show Bad Girls Club—a few of the featured songs have included angst anthems "Five Little Friends" and "Grady Scott (Goodnight, Goodbye)". On September 16, 2012, their song "Changes" off the album Don't Forget The Name was featured on the season finale of season 7 of Keeping Up With The Kardashians.

In August 2011, singer-songwriter-producer Mike Wassef got invited to join as a member of the Screen Actors Guild, as he appeared as a principal performer in a nationally run television advertisement for T-Mobile.

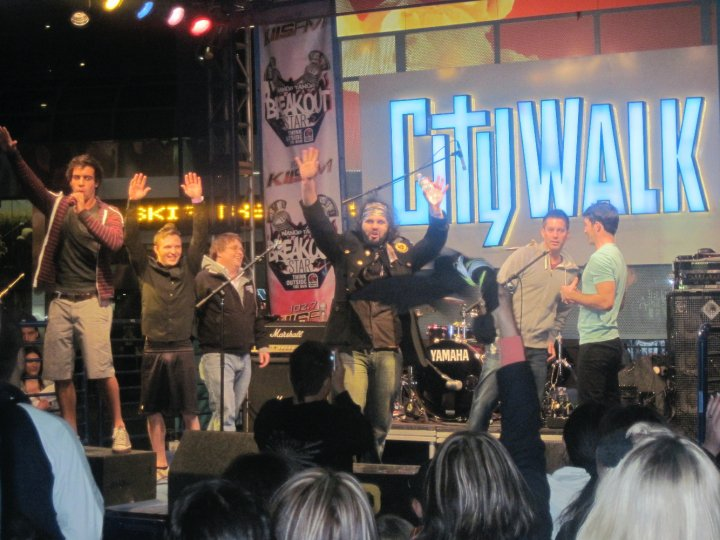
Later Days at Universal CityWalk

== Philanthropy ==
Mike Wassef is a presiding member, and president for non-profit organization Maria's Birthday Wishes For the Homeless, 501(c)(3).

Mike Wassef and the members of Later Days are frequently involved with the activities supporting the Emily Shane Foundation, 501(c)(3), a non-profit organization that was founded by producer Michel Shane in honor of his late daughter Emily Shane who was a loyal fan of the group.

== Discography ==
Date of release	Title	Produced By	Mixed By	Songwriter	
2003	I've Got My Fingers Crossed, but I'm Not Holding My Breath	Mike Wassef	Mike Wassef	Mike Wassef, John Faratzis, Derrick Peltz	--
2005	Catch This Epidemic... EP	Jim Wirt	C.J. Eriksonn	Mike Wassef, John Faratzis, Derrick Peltz	
2007	I Heard They're Getting Huge	Jim Wirt	David Bendeth ("Shake It")	Mike Wassef, John Faratzis, Derrick Peltz	
2009	Don't Forget the Name	Steve Evetts	Steve Evetts	Mike Wassef, John Faratzis, Derrick Peltz	
2012	Paige Miles—related act "Affair W/The Industry (The Miles Chronicles)"	Mike Wassef & Robert Curtin	Robert Curtin Mastered by Robert Curtin	Mike Wassef, John Faratzis, Derrick Peltz	
JAN 2012	Gnar Gnar VS The World (Daywalker Anthem) Single	Mike Wassef & Robert Curtin	Robert Curtin	Mike Wassef, John Faratzis, Derrick Peltz	
FEB 2012	#littlemonstersBIGPROBLEMS (alexWISEUPandSOLVEM) feat. Paige Miles Single	Mike Wassef & Robert Curtin	Robert Curtin	Mike Wassef, Derrick Peltz	
