= Wango Tango =

Annual concert in southern California, US (1998–2019; 2022, 2025)

iHeartRadio Wango Tango
- Genre: Pop, rock, hip-hop
- Dates: May–June
- Location: Southern California
- Years active: 1998–2019; 2022, 2025
- Founders: KIIS-FM
- Website: KIIS official website

iHeartRadio Wango Tango, commonly referred to as simply Wango Tango, is an annual day-long concert produced by local Los Angeles radio station KIIS-FM. The concert series has been staged at venues around southern California including Dodger Stadium in Los Angeles, the Rose Bowl in Pasadena, Angel Stadium in Anaheim, Verizon Wireless Amphitheatre in Irvine, Staples Center in Los Angeles and at the StubHub Center (formerly Home Depot Center) in Carson, California.

The concert series featured several marquee performers in a day long series of sets. Often, celebrities were on hand to introduce each act. The concert was conceived by marketing director Von Freeman and the general manager of KIIS FM, Roy Laughlin.

Since 2019 the concert has been held twice, in 2022 and 2025.

== 1998 lineup ==
The 1998 event was held at Edison International Field of Anaheim on June 13.

- Mariah Carey
- Will Smith
- Hootie & The Blowfish
- Meredith Brooks
- Gloria Estefan
- Paula Cole
- Olivia Newton-John
- *NSYNC
- Vonda Shepard
- Amber
- All Saints
- Wyclef Jean
- Tom Jones

== 1999 lineup ==
The 1999 event was held at Dodger Stadium on June 12.

- Ricky Martin
- Britney Spears
- Will Smith
- 98 Degrees
- Blondie
- UB40
- Shaggy
- Laura Branigan
- Nancy Sinatra
- Enrique Iglesias
- Fabrice Morvan
- Dianne Orellana
- MC Hammer

== 2000 lineup ==
The 2000 event was held at Dodger Stadium on May 13.

- *NSYNC
- Bosson
- Eiffel 65
- Hanson
- Marc Anthony
- Jessica Simpson (with Nick Lachey)
- Brian McKnight
- Sugar Ray
- Goo Goo Dolls
- Lenny Kravitz
- Enrique Iglesias
- Sisqo

== 2001 lineup ==
The 2001 2-day event was held at Dodger Stadium on June 16–17.

- 3LW
- Backstreet Boys
- Blue Man Group
- Britney Spears
- American Hi-Fi
- Dream
- Eden's Crush
- Nelly Furtado
- Jessica Simpson
- Nikka Costa
- Shaggy
- Sean "Puffy" Combs
- Ricky Martin
- Samantha Mumba
- Wayne Newton
- Aerosmith
- The Bee Gees
- Vertical Horizon
- Pink/Mýa/Lil' Kim/Christina Aguilera (singing "Lady Marmalade")

== 2002 lineup ==
The 2002 event was held at the Rose Bowl on June 15.

- Vanessa Carlton
- Michelle Branch
- O-Town
- Craig David
- India.Arie
- Marc Anthony
- Paulina Rubio
- Nick Carter (with Aaron Carter)
- Kelly Osbourne (with Pure Rubbish)
- Pink (with Steven Tyler)
- Alanis Morissette
- No Doubt
- Celine Dion
- Will Smith
- Ja Rule (with Ashanti)
- Mary J. Blige

== 2003 lineup ==
The 2003 event was held at the Rose Bowl on May 17.

- Kiss
- Sting
- Bowling for Soup
- Boomkat
- Amanda Perez
- Santana
- Christina Aguilera
- Ruben Studdard
- Lisa Marie Presley
- Sugar Ray
- Paris Hilton
- Nelly
- Tyrese
- Craig David
- Michelle Branch
- Jennifer Love Hewitt
- O-Town
- Daniel Bedingfield
- JC Chasez (w/ Drumlines)

== 2004 lineup ==
The 2004 event was held at the Rose Bowl on May 15.

- Ashlee Simpson
- Backstreet Boys
- Cassidy
- Enrique Iglesias
- Fefe Dobson
- the Black Eyed Peas
- Good Charlotte
- Haylie Duff
- Hilary Duff
- J-Kwon
- JC Chasez
- Janet Jackson
- Jessica Simpson
- Kimberley Locke
- Lenny Kravitz
- Maroon 5
- N*E*R*D
- Nick Cannon
- OutKast
- William Hung
- The Pussycat Dolls
- Rooney

== 2005 lineup ==
The 2005 event was held at Angel Stadium of Anaheim on May 14.

- Gwen Stefani
- Will Smith
- Jennifer Lopez
- Kelly Clarkson
- The Black Eyed Peas
- Ludacris
- Backstreet Boys
- Ciara
- Lindsay Lohan
- Simple Plan
- Paulo Arago
- Natalie
- Pussycat Dolls
- Frankie J
- Fat Joe

== 2006 lineup ==
The 2006 event was held at Verizon Wireless Amphitheatre on May 7.

- Kanye West
- Mary J. Blige
- Daddy Yankee
- Rihanna
- Ne-Yo
- Ray-J
- Natasha Bedingfield
- Nick Cannon
- Baby Bash

== 2007 lineup ==
The 2007 event was held at Verizon Wireless Amphitheatre on May 12.

- Omarion
- Pitbull
- Gym Class Heroes
- Robin Thicke
- Elliott Yamin
- Baby Bash
- Paula DeAnda
- Fergie
- Kelly Clarkson
- Enrique Iglesias
- Ludacris

== 2008 lineup ==
The 2008 event was held at Verizon Wireless Amphitheatre on May 10.

- Pitbull
- Snoop Dogg
- Flo Rida
- Danity Kane
- Cherish
- Miley Cyrus
- Shwayze
- Prima J
- Jonas Brothers
- Have Heart

== 2009 lineup ==
The 2009 event was held at Verizon Wireless Amphitheatre on May 9.

- The Black Eyed Peas
- Kelly Clarkson
- Flo Rida
- Lady Gaga
- All American Rejects
- Soulja Boy
- Kevin Rudolf
- Pitbull
- Madcon
- Quest Crew
- Jeremih
- Special Performance by Jamie Foxx
- FREQUENCY 5

== 2010 lineup ==
The 2010 event was held at Staples Center on May 15.

=== Main Stage ===
- Usher
- Ludacris (with Taio Cruz)
- Akon
- Justin Bieber
- B.o.B (with Bruno Mars and Rivers Cuomo)
- Adam Lambert
- Iyaz
- Ke$ha
- David Guetta
- Kelly Rowland

=== Village Stage ===
- Auburn
- Alexis Jordan
- JLS
- Wonder Girls
- Justin Gaston
- Charice
- Breakout Star Winner Later Days

== 2011 lineup ==
The 2011 event was held at the Staples Center on May 14.

=== Main Stage ===
- Cody Simpson
- Cobra Starship
- New Boyz
- Selena Gomez & the Scene
- Jason DeRulo
- Far East Movement
- Casey Abrams & Pia Toscano
- Matthew Morrison
- Lupe Fiasco
- Ke$ha
- T-Pain
- Pitbull
- Ne-Yo
- Jennifer Lopez
- Special Guest DJ Nick Cannon
- Special Guest Host Britney Spears

=== Village Stage ===
- Sabi
- LaLa Romero
- RPM
- The Rej3ctz
- The Ready Set
- Breakout Star Winner:
- Star, Chase Jordan
- Cimorelli

== 2012 lineup ==
The 2012 event was held at the Home Depot Center on May 12.

=== Main Stage ===
- Nicki Minaj
- Pitbull
- Maroon 5
- Foster the People
- B.o.B
- Gym Class Heroes
- J. Cole
- Big Sean
- Wiz Khalifa
- Childish Gambino
- K'naan
- Chiddy Bang
- The Wanted
- Wallpaper
- Diggy Simmons
- Carly Rae Jepsen
- Hosted by Ryan Seacrest
- Special Guest DJ Pauly D
- Special Guest Host Justin Bieber

=== Village Stage ===
- Colby O'Donis
- 7Lions
- Megan & Liz
- Zni
- W3 The Future
- Manika
- Eva Universe
- Elaine Faye

== 2013 lineup ==
The 2013 event was held at the Home Depot Center on May 11.

=== Main Stage ===
- Avril Lavigne
- Bruno Mars
- Maroon 5
- Flo Rida
- will.i.am w/Shelby Spalione
- Demi Lovato
- Fall Out Boy
- Afrojack
- Miguel
- Icona Pop
- Krewella
- Emeli Sandé
- Ariana Grande
- Hosted by Ryan Seacrest
- Special Guest Host Britney Spears

=== Village Stage ===
- Emblem3
- Kalin & Myles
- Will Jordan
- Becky G
- Vali
- Asher Monroe
- Alex Jacke

== 2014 lineup ==
The 2014 event was held at the StubHub Center on May 10.

=== Main Stage ===
- Maroon 5
- Shakira
- OneRepublic
- Ed Sheeran
- Paramore
- Ariana Grande with Iggy Azalea and Big Sean
- The Chainsmokers
- Rixton
- Kid Ink
- A Great Big World with Christina Aguilera
- B.o.B
- Calvin Harris
- Zedd
- R5
- Tiësto
- Hosted by Ryan Seacrest

=== Village Stage ===
- The Hotel Lobby
- Rixton
- G.R.L.
- My Crazy Girlfriend
- R5

== 2015 lineup ==
The 2015 event was held at the StubHub Center on May 9.

=== Main Stage ===
- Fifth Harmony
- Tori Kelly
- Sia
- Jason Derulo
- Ne-Yo
- Calvin Harris
- Kanye West
- Nick Jonas
- Natalie La Rose
- Meghan Trainor
- David Guetta
- LunchMoney Lewis
- Justin Bieber
- Echosmith

Hosted by Ryan Seacrest

=== Village Stage ===
- Fifth Harmony
- The Hotel Lobby
- Eden xo
- Jake Miller
- Wild Style
- Syd Youth
- Alyxx Dione
- Bean
- R5
- Los 5

== 2016 lineup ==
The 2016 event was held at the StubHub Center on May 14, 2016.

=== Main Stage ===
- Demi Lovato
- Zayn
- Ariana Grande
- Gwen Stefani
- Meghan Trainor
- Fifth Harmony
- Iggy Azalea
- Kygo
- DNCE
- Alessia Cara
- The Chainsmokers
- Mike Posner
- Hosted by Ryan Seacrest

== 2017 lineup ==
The 2017 event was held at the StubHub Center on May 13, 2017.

=== Main Stage ===
- Backstreet Boys
- Katy Perry
- Maroon 5
- Niall Horan
- Miley Cyrus
- Zedd with Alessia Cara
- Machine Gun Kelly with Camila Cabello
- Hailee Steinfeld
- Noah Cyrus
- Halsey
- Julia Michaels
- Luis Fonsi

=== Village Stage ===
- Noah Cyrus
- Jordan Fisher
- Aaron Carter
- Olivia Holt
- Ocean Park Standoff
- Hey Violet

== 2018 lineup ==
The 2018 event was held at the Banc of California Stadium on June 2, 2018. Additionally, this edition of the event was added to the national iHeartRadio concert schedule and advertised nationally.

=== Main Stage ===
- Ariana Grande
- Shawn Mendes
- Sabrina Carpenter
- Janelle Monáe
- 5 Seconds of Summer
- NF
- Meghan Trainor
- Miguel
- Backstreet Boys
- Marshmello (with special guest appearance by Logic)

== 2019 lineup ==
The 2019 event was held at Dignity Health Sports Park on June 1, 2019.

=== Main stage ===
- Taylor Swift (with special guest appearance by Brendon Urie)
- Jonas Brothers
- Zedd
- Halsey (with special guest appearance by Yungblud)
- Ally Brooke (with special guest appearance by Tyga)
- Ava Max
- Fletcher
- Tomorrow X Together
- 5 Seconds of Summer

=== Village Stage ===
- CNCO
- Jake Miller
- Scotty Sire
- Asher Angel
- Madison Beer
- Ally Brooke

== 2020 lineup ==
The 2020 event was scheduled to take place at the Dignity Health Sports Park in Carson, California on June 6, 2020, but on March 24, it was cancelled in response to the COVID-19 pandemic as well as a gatherings ban issued by California Governor Gavin Newsom nearly two weeks earlier. Harry Styles was scheduled to headline.

== 2022 lineup ==
The 2022 event was held at the Dignity Health Sports Park in Carson, California on Saturday, June 4, 2022.

- Shawn Mendes
- The Chainsmokers
- Camila Cabello
- Becky G
- Charlie Puth
- Lauv
- 5 Seconds of Summer
- Tate McRae
- Latto
- Lauren Spencer-Smith
- Gayle
- Em Beihold
- Diplo
