= Once Upon a Dream (Enchantment album) =

Studio album by Enchantment
- Released: 1978
- Recorded: 1977 at Sound Suite, Detroit, Michigan; Record Plant, New York City, New York; Hit Factory, New York City, New York; Criteria Studios, Miami, Florida
- Genre: Soul
- Labels: Roadshow, United Artists
- Producer: Michael Stokes

Enchantment chronology
Enchantment (1977)	Once Upon a Dream (1978)	Journey to the Land Of... Enchantment (1979)

Singles from Once Upon a Dream
- 1. "It's You That I Need" Released: December 1977; 2. "If You're Ready (Here It Comes)" Released: May 1978

Professional ratings
Review scores
Source	Rating
AllMusic	3/5 stars

Once Upon a Dream is the second album by Detroit, Michigan-based group Enchantment. The album was remastered and reissued with bonus tracks in 2012 by Big Break Records.

== Track listing ==
All tracks are written by Michael Stokes and Verdell Lanier, except where noted.

Side one
No.	Title	Length
1.	"Sunny Shine Feeling"	3:43
2.	"If You're Ready (Here It Comes)"	4:42
3.	"It's You That I Need"	5:59
4.	"You're the One"	4:32

Side two
No.	Title	Length
5.	"You Must Be an Angel"	3:03
6.	"Up Higher"	2:05
7.	"Silly Love Song" (Michael Stokes, Emanuel Johnson)	4:55
8.	"Angel in My Life"	3:45
9.	"Trying to Get Over (With You)"	5:52

2012 remastered reissue bonus tracks
No.	Title	Length
10.	"It's You That I Need" (Single Version)	3:53
11.	"If You're Ready (Here It Comes)" (Single Version)	3:42

== Personnel ==
- Michael Stokes – piano, clavinet, synthesizer, electric piano, harpsichord, synthesizer
- Jeff Mironov, John Tropea, Ken Bushell, Lance Quinn, Robert Lowe – guitar
- Patrick Rebillot – keyboards
- Neil Jason, Will Lee – bass
- Allan Schwartzberg – drums
- Jack Brokensha, Carl Small – percussion
- Carl Austin, The Detroit Symphony Orchestra, John Trudell – strings, horns

== Production ==
- Mastering by George Marino at Sterling Sound, NYC

== Chart performance ==
Released in 1977, the album peaked at number eight on the R&B albums chart in 1978. The crossover ballad, "It's You That I Need", reached number one on the R&B singles chart, while "If You're Ready (Here It Comes)" came in at number fourteen on the R&B chart.

Album

Chart (1978)	Peak position
U.S. Billboard Top LPs	46
U.S. Billboard Top Soul LPs	8

Singles

Year	Single	Peak chart positions	
Year	Single	US Hot 100	US R&B
1978	"It's You That I Need"	33	1
1978	"If You're Ready (Here It Comes)"	—	14
