= IV Xample =

American vocal quartet (1992–1998)

- Origin: Los Angeles, California, U.S.
- Genres: R&B, soul, new jack swing
- Years active: 1992–1998
- Labels: MCA/Universal (1992–1998); Universal
- Members: Dre Allen; BC Chevis; Raymond Chevis; Lucious Woodert

IV Xample was an American vocal quartet who recorded successfully in the 1990s and are best remembered for the single "I'd Rather Be Alone" from their gold debut MCA Records album For Example.

The original members were Andre "Dre" Allen, Robert "Bobby C" Chevis (aka Athemus Chevis), his brother Raymond "Runni Rae" Chevis, and Bryant "Lucious" Woodert. The group formed in Los Angeles, and first recorded for MCA Records in 1995. Their first single, "The Swang," achieved popular local radio play in Los Angeles on 92.3 The Beat and went on to number 1 on the station's popular "4 Play at 4" segment that showcased up and coming local artists. After the song gained popularity, a bidding war between Virgin Records, Giant, and MCA Records took place with MCA coming out the best choice for the group. Upon signing to MCA, they achieved greater commercial success with their next single, "I'd Rather Be Alone," which reached number 44 on both the Billboard Hot 100 and Top 40 status on the R&B charts. The follow-up, "From the Fool," made number 95 on the R&B charts.

They released an album, For Example, and toured Japan, Australia, Canada and elsewhere. Soon afterward however, Bobby Chevis left the group for a solo career. His recording "Why-Oh-Why," under the name B.C., was a Billboard Hot 100 pop hit in 1999. The group then split up, with Andre "Dre" Allen later having success as a performer, releasing three solo albums for Tommy Boy Records and his own label Movemakers Entertainment. He also worked as a songwriter, producer and director writing for artists such as Outkast, Master P, Lil Romeo, Babyface, Montell Jordan, En Vogue, Will Downing and Jesse Powell.
