= Journey to the Land Of... Enchantment =

Studio album by Enchantment
- Released: 1979
- Recorded: 1979
- Genre: Soul
- Labels: Roadshow, RCA
- Producer: Michael Stokes

Enchantment chronology
Once Upon a Dream (1978)	Journey to the Land Of... Enchantment (1979)	Soft Lights, Sweet Music (1980)

Journey to the Land Of... Enchantment is an album by Detroit, Michigan-based R&B group Enchantment. Released in 1979, the album peaked at number twenty-five on the R&B albums chart. This was their last album for Roadshow Records before moving on to RCA Records the following year.

== Critical reception ==
Professional ratings
Review scores
Source	Rating
AllMusic	3/5 stars

Newsday wrote that "this is soul music ... with the emphasis on lead vocals and full backing harmonies that is hardly ever made anymore."

== Track listing ==
Side one
No.	Title	Writer(s)	Length
1.	"Future Gonna Get You"	Michael Stokes, Joe Thomas, Robert Lowe	3:50
2.	"Magnetic Feel"	Michael Stokes, Joe Thomas, Robert Lowe	4:41
3.	"Anyway You Want It"	Emanuel Johnson	3:15
4.	"Love Melodies"	Michael Stokes, Joe Thomas	3:35
5.	"Oasis of Love"	Michael Stokes, Joe Thomas	3:44

Side two
No.	Title	Writer(s)	Length
6.	"I Wanna Boogie"	Michael Stokes, Joe Thomas, Robert Lowe	3:48
7.	"Fun"	Michael Stokes, Joe Thomas	2:29
8.	"Let Me Entertain You"	Michael Stokes, Joe Thomas, Robert Lowe	3:38
9.	"Forever More"	Emanuel Johnson	4:58
10.	"Where Do We Go from Here"	Emanuel Johnson	4:20
11.	"Journey"	Michael Stokes	1:50

2016 remastered reissue bonus tracks
No.	Title	Length
12.	"Magnetic Feel" (Original Single Version)	3:46
13.	"Forever More" (Original Single Version)	3:58
14.	"Where Do We Go from Here" (Original Single Version)	3:46

== Charts ==
Chart (1979)	Peak position
U.S. Billboard Top LPs	145
U.S. Billboard Top Soul LPs	25

Singles

Year	Single	Peak positions
Year	Single	US R&B
1979	"Where Do We Go from Here?"	29
1979	"Any Way You Want It"	38
