= Soft Lights, Sweet Music =

Studio album by Enchantment
- Released: 1980
- Recorded: 1980 at United Sound Systems, Detroit, Michigan; Universal Studio, Chicago, Illinois; Britannia Studios, Los Angeles, California
- Genre: Soul
- Label: RCA
- Producer: Don Davis

Enchantment chronology
Journey to the Land Of... Enchantment (1979)	Soft Lights, Sweet Music (1980)	Enchanted Lady (1982)

Professional ratings
Review scores
Source	Rating
AllMusic	3/5 stars

Soft Lights, Sweet Music is the fourth album by the Detroit, Michigan-based R&B group Enchantment.

== Track listing ==
1. "Settin' It Out" - 3:59
2. "I'm Who You Found (Not Who You Lost)" - 4:13
3. "I Believe in You" - 5:04
4. "Moment of Weakness" - 3:45
5. "I Can't Fake It" - 2:54
6. "Soft Lights, Sweet Music" - 4:20
7. "Are You Ready for Love" - 4:07
8. "I Can't Be The One" - 3:07
9. "You and Me" - 5:03

== Personnel ==
- Emanuel Johnson, George Roundtree, Rudy Robinson, William Wooten, Eugene Butler - Keyboards
- Bruce Nazarian - Guitar
- Jerry Jones - Drums
- Greg Coles, Tommy DeLoch, Anthony Tony Willis, Jervonny Collier - Bass
- Mike Lacopelli, Trenita Womack, Carl "Butch" Small - Percussion

== Charts ==
Chart (1980)	Peak
U.S. Billboard Top LPs	202
U.S. Billboard Top Soul LPs	65

Singles

Year	Single	Peak chart positions	
Year	Single	US R&B	US Dan
1980	"Settin' It Out"	—	47
1981	"Moment of Weakness"	47	—
