= Enchanted Lady =

Studio album by Enchantment
- Released: 1982
- Recorded: 1982
- Genre: Soul
- Label: Columbia
- Producer: Raymond Reid, William Anderson

Enchantment chronology
Soft Lights, Sweet Music (1980)	Enchanted Lady (1982)	Utopia (1983)

Professional ratings
Review scores
Source	Rating
AllMusic	3/5 stars

Enchanted Lady is the fifth album by Detroit, Michigan-based R&B group Enchantment. It was their first for Columbia Records.

== Track listing ==
1. "I Know Your Hot Spot"
2. "Enchanted Lady"
3. "Toe Jammin'"
4. "I Can't Forget You"
5. "Adora"
6. "Only You"
7. "Your Love is Like a Melody"
8. "Peace is What The World Needs"

== Charts ==
Singles

Year	Single	Peak chart positions
Year	Single	US R&B
1982	"I Know Your Hot Spot"	45
