= You (Jesse Powell song) =

Single by Jesse Powell

from the album 'Bout It
- Released: February 2, 1999
- Recorded: 1995–1996
- Genre: R&B
- Length: 5:18
- Label: Silas
- Songwriter(s): Jesse Powell, Carl Roland
- Producer(s): Carl Roland

Jesse Powell singles chronology
"I Wasn't with It" (1998)	"You" (1999)	"'Bout It, 'Bout It" (1999)

"You" is a song by American R&B singer Jesse Powell and appeared on Powell's first two albums, Jesse Powell and 'Bout It.

The song, released as a single in 1999, became the biggest hit of his career, peaking at number two on the Billboard Hot R&B/Hip-Hop Songs chart and at number ten on the Billboard Hot 100.

== Music video ==
The official music video was directed by Steve Wills.

== Year-end charts ==
Chart (1999)	Position
U.S. Billboard Hot 100	59
