= Make Time for Love =

Studio album by Keith Washington
- Released: 1991
- Label: Qwest
- Producer: Keith Washington; Terry Coffey; Barry Eastmond; Paul Laurence; Jon Nettlesbey; Laney Stewart; Trey Stone; Raoul Roach (exec. producer)

Keith Washington chronology
Make Time for Love (1991)	You Make It Easy (1993)

Singles from Make Time for Love
- 1. "Kissing You" Released: 1991; 2. "Are You Still in Love with Me" Released: 1991; 3. "Make Time for Love" Released: 1992; 4. "When You Love Somebody" Released: 1992

Make Time for Love is the debut studio album by American R&B vocalist Keith Washington, released in 1991 by Quincy Jones's Qwest Records. It includes the single "Kissing You", which reached number 40 on the US Billboard Hot 100 and number one on the Hot R&B/Hip-Hop Songs chart.

== Critical reception ==
Professional ratings
Review scores
Source	Rating
AllMusic	4/5 stars

In a review for AllMusic, Craig Lytle described the album as "resplendent", the leading single "Kissing You" as "captivating", and "When You Love Somebody" as "a superb song". He went on to opine that "The production on this album is excellent, as are Washington's vocals as he utilizes his vibrato on most of the selections."

== Track listing ==
No.	Title	Writer(s)	Length
1.	"All Night"	Keith Washington; Jon Nettlesbey; Terry Coffey	4:20
2.	"Make Time for Love"	Nettlesbey; Coffey	5:46
3.	"Kissing You"	Washington; Marsha Jenkins; Rodney Shelton	4:53
4.	"Are You Still in Love with Me"	Washington; Barry Eastmond; Jolyon Skinner	5:07
5.	"When You Love Somebody"	Washington; Philip L. Stewart; Tony Haynes	4:42
6.	"Ready, Willing and Able"	Washington; Stewart; Haynes	4:55
7.	"I'll Be There"	Eastmond; Skinner	4:48
8.	"When It Comes to You"	Washington; Eastmond	4:44
9.	"Lovers After All"	Washington	4:47
10.	"Closer"	Washington; Dwayne Nettlesbey	5:01

== Personnel ==
Adapted from the album's liner notes.

=== Musicians ===
- Keith Washington – lead vocals (all tracks), vocal arrangement (track 1), backing vocals (tracks 3, 5, 6, 8, 10)
- Gerald Albright – saxophone (track 10)
- Maxie Anderson – backing vocals (tracks 3, 10)
- Mike Bradford – bass (track 10)
- Alex Brown – backing vocals (track 5)
- Tony Brown – bass (track 5)
- Bridgette Bryant – backing vocals (tracks 3, 10)
- Robert Burns – additional percussion (tracks 1, 2)
- Mike "Dino" Campbell – guitar (track 9)
- Bokie Coleman – bass (tracks 1, 2), guitar (track 2)
- Terry Coffey – vocal arrangement (tracks 1, 2), strings arrangement (track 2), drums (track 2), keyboards (track 2)
- Paulinho da Costa – percussion (tracks 1–3, 10)
- Vaughn Cromwell – backing vocals (track 6)
- Richie Davis – guitar (track 5)
- Nathan East – bass (track 3)
- Barry Eastmond – keyboards (track 7, 8), drum programming (track 7, 8)
- Sephra Herman – string contractor (track 1), horn contracting (track 2)
- Mortonette Jenkins – backing vocals (track 5)
- Paul Laurence – synthesizer (track 3), keyboards (track 9), programming (track 9)
- Ricky Lawson – drums (tracks 3, 10)
- Yogi Lee – backing vocals (track 9)
- Yolanda Lee – backing vocals (tracks 7, 8)
- Michael Nash – keyboards (track 3)
- Dwayne Nettlesbey – keyboards (track 10)
- Jon Nettlesbey – drums (tracks 1, 2), keyboards (track 1), vocal arrangement (tracks 1, 2)
- Eric Rehl – synthesizer (tracks 7, 8)
- Nikki Richards – backing vocals (tracks 7, 8)
- Paul Riser – string arrangement (track 1), horn arrangement (track 2)
- Laney Stewart – drum & synthesizer programming (tracks 5, 6), backing vocals (tracks 5, 6), vocal arrangement (track 6)
- Wayne Stewart – drums (track 5)
- Trey Stone – additional rhythm arrangement (tracks 3, 10), guitar (tracks 3, 10), string synthesizer (track 10)
- Tom Verdonck – guitar (track 1)
- Georg Wadenius – guitars (track 8)
- Audrey Wheeler – backing vocals (track 9)

=== Technical ===
- Keith Washington – producer (tracks 3, 10), arranger (track 10)
- Jon Nettlesbey – producer (tracks 1, 2), arrangement (tracks 1, 2), additional production (tracks 3, 10)
- Terry Coffey – producer (tracks 1, 2), arrangement (tracks 1, 2), additional production (tracks 3, 10)
- Trey Stone – producer (tracks 3, 10), arranger (track 10)
- Barry Eastmond – producer (tracks 4, 7, 8), arranger (tracks 4, 7, 8)
- Laney Stewart – producer (tracks 5, 6), recording (tracks 5, 6)
- Paul Laurence – producer (track 9)
- Raoul Roach – executive producer
- Wolfgang Aicholz – vocals and bass recording (track 1)
- Ron Banks – engineer (tracks 3, 9)
- Mike Becker – vocals and overdubs recording (track 2), engineer (track 10)
- John Chamberlin – second engineer (tracks 5, 6)
- Earl Cohen – recording (tracks 4, 7, 8), mixing (tracks 4, 7, 8); assisted by Dave Lebowitz (track 4)
- Bernie Grundman – mastering (tracks 5, 6)
- Mick Guzauski – mixing (track 5, 6)
- Alan Myerson – mixing (tracks 1, 2)
- Dennis Parker – basic track recording; assisted by Morris Crawford (track 2)
- Barney Perkins – engineer (tracks 3, 10), mixing (tracks 3, 9)
- Joe Schiff – percussion recording (tracks 1, 2)
- Mike Scott – engineer (track 3)
- Alan Sides – strings recording; assisted by Mike Ross (track 1)
- Eric Sproull – recording (tracks 5, 6)
- Chris Steinmetz – basic track and overdub recording (track 1)
- Tim Stedman – art direction, design
- Jeff Gold – art direction
- Diego Uchitel – photography

== Charts ==
Chart performance for Make Time for Love
Chart (1991)	Peak position
US Billboard 200	48
US Top R&B/Hip-Hop Albums (Billboard)	1
