= Jesse (album) =

Studio album by Jesse Powell
- Released: October 14, 2003
- Genre: R&B
- Length: 51:01
- Labels: D3; Monopoly; Riviera

Jesse Powell chronology
JP (2001)	Jesse (2003)

Jesse is the fourth and final studio album by American singer Jesse Powell. It was released on October 14, 2003 through D3 Entertainment, Monopoly Music and Riviera Records. Jesse has sold 195,000 copies in the United States and over 350,000 copies worldwide as of April 2007.

== Critical reception ==
Professional ratings
Review scores
Source	Rating
Vibe	2.5/5 stars

Vibe editor Laura Checkoway wrote that "after three albums and no remarkable hits, Jesse Powell hasn't completely fallen off the R&B map. And while this, his fourth effort, won't help him make a sudden takeover, it attempts to keep his name, if not his music, humming in our ears [...] There's plenty of smooth romance to go around, but none of the grit, grain, passion, and pain that push the heart's buttons and make music memorable."

== Track listing ==
Jesse — Standard edition
No.	Title	Writer(s)	Producer(s)	Length
1.	"Touching It Tonight"	Jesse Powell; Neely Denkins; Vito Colapietro	The Co-Stars	3:39
2.	"Talking in Your Sleep"	Powell; Denkins; Colapietro	The Co-Stars	3:38
3.	"Keep on Lovin'"	Powell; Denkins; Colapietro	The Co-Stars	3:21
4.	"Lady"	Powell	Powell; Bertrand "Sleepy" Shotwell; Chris "The Arsonist" Jenkins^{[a]}	4:32
5.	"By the Way"	Carl Roland; Charles Jordan; Gavin Rhone	Roland	4:18
6.	"Did You Cry"	Shotwell; Powell	Jenkins	4:34
7.	"I Like It"	El DeBarge; Etterlene Jordan; William DeBarge	Powell; Jenkins; Les Butler^{[a]}	4:02
8.	"Come Back Home"	Cornelio Austin; Kevin Turrentine	Austin	5:14
9.	"Ebony"	Carl Roland; Powell	Roland	4:21
10.	"I Will"	Jenkins; Trina Powell	Jenkins	4:37
11.	"I Want You"	Powell	Powell; Jenkins^{[a]}	4:16
12.	"I Can't Help It"	Stevie Wonder; Susaye Greene	Powell; Butler^{[a]}; Jenkins^{[a]}	4:29

Notes

- ^{^a} denotes co-producer

== Charts ==
Chart (2003)	Peak position
US Top R&B/Hip-Hop Albums (Billboard)	85
