= Malbec (band) =

American indie rock band (2003–2010)

- Origin: Los Angeles, California, United States
- Genres: Indie rock, hip hop, indie pop
- Years active: 2003–2010
- Labels: Songs Music Publishing, Double O Buffalo
- Spinoffs: Foster the People; Beginners
- Past members: Pablo Signori; Samantha Barbera; Nick Ruth; Sidney Miller; Mark Pontius

Malbec was an American indie rock band, formed in 2003. Malbec was noted as on the forefront of bands which integrated sequenced hip-hop beats with modern pop stylings; their musical style includes influences from Southern hip hop, Britpop, classical compositions and folk music.

Malbec disbanded in 2010 and notably began the music careers of former Foster the People drummer Mark Pontius, hip-hop producer Speakerbomb (Freddie Gibbs), and pop songwriter and producer Nick Ruth (Zara Larsson, Kelly Clarkson, Night Terrors of 1927), among others. Members Samantha Barbera and Ruth would go on to form Beginners in 2014.

== History ==
Malbec began in 2003 and officially formed in early 2004 in Los Angeles, California. Malbec was made of friends Pablo Signori, Nick Ruth, and Samantha Barbera, who met at Indiana University, in addition to Sid Miller and Mark Pontius. Their name is nod to frontman Pablo Signori's family origin in Argentina. Malbec self-released their debut EP Malbec in February 2005, produced by Tony Fagenson. They released their sophomore EP in April 2006. This record, Keep It A Secret, was produced by Richard Gibbs and Rick Parker.

In 2007, they signed a publishing deal with Songs Music Publishing and were heard on a number of television shows and movie soundtracks, including One Tree Hill, Flight of the Phoenix, Long Way Round, The Omen, Palo Alto and in the episode "Chuck vs. the Colonel" in NBC's Chuck. They are also featured on Fox's show VIP Passport, Kyle XY, Dirty Sexy Money, My Best Friend's Girl. They have also had placements in MTV's 16 & Pregnant, Teen Mom, and Teen Mom 2, as well as ABC Family's 2011 show, The Lying Game. Malbec also recorded "Given the Times" in Simlish for the 2007 Electronic Arts game The Sims: Pet Stories 2.

Malbec released their self-produced full-length debut album Dawn of Our Age in March 2008. From December 2008 to April 2009, Malbec released a series of five EPs in five months, called the Answering Machine EPs. They wrote, recorded and released a new EP every month. In 2012, the EPs were released as a sixteen-track album.

Malbec toured with Mutemath, Mat Kearney, OneRepublic, Under the Influence of Giants, Phantom Planet, Rock Kills Kid, Copeland, The Knux, and Tally Hall.

In December 2009, Malbec parted ways with their original drummer, Mark Pontius, who left to found the indie pop band Foster the People. The rest of the band remained together and worked on new music, including two collaborations with The Knux, "F@&k You" and "Fruits." They disbanded in 2010 and released an EP of unreleased material Last Dance in December 2011.

== Members ==
- Pablo Signori – vocals, piano, guitar
- Samantha Barbera – bass guitar, backing vocals
- Nick Ruth – guitar, backing vocals
- Sidney Miller – keyboards, programming
- Mark Pontius – drums

== Discography ==
Malbec EP (2006) via Double O Buffalo

No.	Title	Producer(s)	Length
1.	"Closer"	Tony Fagenson	3:42
2.	"Blue"	Tony Fagenson	3:34
3.	"Go"	Tony Fagenson	3:50
4.	"Solstice"	Tony Fagenson	4:30
5.	"Rectangle"	Tony Fagenson	4:34
6.	"Hidden Track"	Malbec	4:46

Keep It A Secret EP (2007) via Double O Buffalo

No.	Title	Producer(s)	Length
1.	"Given The Times"	Richard Gibbs	3:53
2.	"The Visit"	Rick Parker	3:34
3.	"21"	Richard Gibbs	3:52
4.	"Keep It A Secret"	Richard Gibbs	3:34
5.	"Given The Times (Simlish Version)"	Richard Gibbs	3:56
6.	"21 (Acoustic Version)"	Malbec	3:52

Dawn Of Our Age (2008) via Double O Buffalo

No.	Title	Producer(s)	Length
1.	"Dawn Of Our Age"	Malbec	4:37
2.	"Irene Song"	Malbec	3:03
3.	"Summer"	Malbec	3:25
4.	"Was It"	Malbec	3:50
5.	"Stranded In The Spotlight"	Malbec	4:07
6.	"Tell Me"	Malbec	3:24
7.	"Prison House Poet"	Malbec	4:21
8.	"Quiet Night, Quiet Places"	Malbec	2:59
9.	"Consider It Done"	Malbec	3:33
10.	"Survivor"	Malbec	3:39
11.	"Heaven"	Malbec	2:43
12.	"America"	Malbec	4:27
13.	"Been A While"	Malbec	4:08

Answering Machine EP #1 (2008) via Double O Buffalo

No.	Title	Producer(s)	Length
1.	"Intro Message"	Malbec	0:36
2.	"Answering Machine"	Malbec	2:50
3.	"The Interlude"	Malbec	0:42
4.	"World Cup"	Malbec	4:52
5.	"Message from Sid"	Malbec	0:30
6.	"The Truth"	Malbec	3:35

Answering Machine EP #2 (2009) via Double O Buffalo

No.	Title	Producer(s)	Length
1.	"Story Of A Broken Heart"	Malbec	2:42
2.	"Jen Message"	Malbec	0:35
3.	"Falling Off"	Malbec	4:16
4.	"Free"	Malbec	5:00

Answering Machine EP #3 (2009) via Double O Buffalo

No.	Title	Producer(s)	Length
1.	"Home"	Malbec	4:15
2.	"Pictures In Magazines"	Malbec	2:47
3.	"Steven Message"	Malbec	0:29
4.	"When We See"	Malbec	3:50

Answering Machine EP #4 (2009) via Double O Buffalo

No.	Title	Producer(s)	Length
1.	"Dancing The Night Away"	Malbec	3:29
2.	"Goon Message"	Malbec	0:21
3.	"You're Coming Around"	Malbec	3:14
4.	"Riley Message"	Malbec	0:31
5.	"Casualty Of Love"	Malbec	4:04

Answering Machine EP #5 (2009) via Double O Buffalo

No.	Title	Producer(s)	Length
1.	"Unus Vita"	Malbec	4:21
2.	"Pfeffer Message"	Malbec	0:11
3.	"It Won't Feel Right"	Malbec	4:22
4.	"Something Wicked This Way Comes"	Malbec	3:31
5.	"Joseph Message"	Malbec	0:33
6.	"In The End"	Malbec	3:00

Last Dance EP (2011)

No.	Title	Producer(s)	Length
1.	"Victorius"	Malbec	3:42
2.	"Downslide"	Malbec	3:14
3.	"Babylon"	Malbec	3:24
4.	"Waltz with Orion"	Malbec	3:29
