= Dre Allen =

American singer (born 1975)

- Also known as: Dre
- Born: Andre Allen; April 18, 1975 (age 51)
- Origin: Oakland, California, U.S.
- Genres: Pop, R&B
- Instruments: Singer, songwriter, producer/director
- Years active: 1991–present
- Formerly of: IV Xample, The Dre Allen Project

Andre "Dre" Allen (born April 18, 1975) is an American actor, singer, songwriter, music video director, and producer. Born in California's Bay Area, Dre Allen is also the founding member of Los Angeles-based 1990s pop and R&B group IV Xample, whose debut album For Example sold over 500,000 copies worldwide due to the success of their debut single "I'd Rather Be Alone".

Allen's debut solo album was released in 2003 on his independent record label Movemakers Entertainment. The album was called L.Y.F.E. and sold over 240,000 copies through online and nontraditional retail outlets. During this time Allen married Dawn Robinson of the group En Vogue. She joined him on his next album, Ghetto Rockstar and was briefly distributed by Tommy Boy Records but was later moved over to his independent imprint. His third and final album Recovery from his band, The Dre Allen Project, was released in the summer of 2010.It featured production from him, Food Mart Music, Organized Noize, and Jefferey David. The independent album sold 10,000 units in a declining music industry sales climate dominated by major releases. In 2010, Recovery was pulled from shelves in a move Allen called "an attempt to preserve the music for future theatrical uses." As of December 2010, Dre Allen serves as the President and co-owner of The Allen/Sito Group, which houses the event marketing and staffing agency Best Reps Event Marketing. His client roster boasts international brands such as Grand Marnier, The Macallan Scotch Whisky, TGI Friday's, ESPN, NASCAR, Skyy Vodka, Universal Television, Verizon, Axe, Remy Martin, USA Network, and The FIG Event Center in Dallas. He also owns ASG Films, which has a new film in development called The Vigilants, set to shoot in Las Vegas, L.A., and San Francisco in late 2015. Allen received a Grammy nomination for his work as co-writer on Sir Lucious Left Foot: The Son of Chico Dusty, the debut solo album from Outkast rapper Big Boi. Allen has worked with performers and producers Babyface, The Underdogs, Scott Storch, Robin Thicke, Chris Stokes, Narada Michael Walden, Bradley Spalter, Tyga, Kendrick Lamar, Montel Jordan, Master P, Jon B, Az Yet, Kenny Lattimore, Jesse Powell, Pooh Bear aka MDMA, Will Downing, En Vogue, Stevie B, the last studio album in 1999 by R & B legends The Spinners and many more. In addition to all of his creative and entrepreneurial endeavors, Allen was also state licensed in Nevada real estate. Most recently, he is producing and directing several upcoming film and television projects.

== Discography ==
In his career as a recording artist, Allen has been signed to many recording contracts with companies including Warner Chappell Music, MCA/Universal Records, Warner Brothers Music, ADA, Edmonds Record Group, Priority Records, No Limit Records, DV8/Polygram Records, Shankman, Deblasio, & Melina, Tommy Boy, Nicetunes UK, & Capitol Records. These deals yielded very few releases and forced Allen to concentrate his energies on behind the scenes activities like songwriting. As a writer/producer Allen has written songs for Master P, Lil Romeo, Kenneth "Babyface" Edmonds, Tyga, Jamie Foxx, Kendrick Lamar, Az Yet, Jesse Powell, The Hav Plenty Soundtrack, Montell Jordan, The NBA Jam Session, Kenny Lattimore, Stevie B,Will Downing, Ricky Bell of New Edition, Dawn Robinson of En Vogue, Goodie Mobb and has had his songs featured on commercial campaigns for companies like DADA, THE NBA Jam Session, McDonald's, Showtime Networks, & Doritos.

In May 2010, Big Boi left Jive Records and renamed the Dre Allen co-written song Ringtone "Theme Song" & then re-released it on his Island/Def Jam Recordings extended version of the album due to its popularity and receiving over 1.5 million plays on his Myspace page. The single was then used to launch Sony Music and Dada Music's online mobile content delivery venture in Canada and was released on the Def Jam Records label in summer 2011. The song was licensed in a multimillion-dollar deal with Doritos to brand their Doritos late night flavors and an "augmented reality" concert experience with Big Boi and Blink 182 online. The album has since maintained its title among the Top 100 most critically acclaimed albums of all time by Metacritic.
