= Sidney Miller (musician) =

American musician and record producer (born 1980)

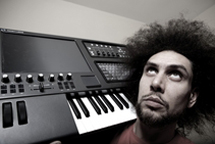
- Miller in 2009

Background information
- Also known as: Speakerbomb
- Born: Sidney Anthony Miller III; September 24, 1980 (age 46); Los Angeles, California, U.S.
- Genres: Pop; R&B; hip hop; alternative rock
- Occupations: Record producer; audio engineer; keyboardist; arranger; film composer
- Instruments: Keyboard, piano, synthesizer, drums, drum machines
- Years active: 1997–present
- Labels: Universal Music Publishing Group; Decon; Atlantic
- Member of: The Knux; L.A. Riot Music; The Sharpshootaz
- Formerly of: Malbec
- Website: www.pmpworldwide.com/speakerbomb

Sidney Miller III (born September 24, 1980), also known by his production name of Speakerbomb, is an American record producer and keyboardist. He was a founding member of the Los Angeles-based band Malbec, and was also a keyboardist in the hip hop group The Knux. He is currently a producing and writing as a member of The Sharpshootaz production/songwriting team, working with artists like Alex Jacke and Jesse McCartney.

== Early life ==
Sidney Miller III was born in 1980 in Los Angeles to two music trade magazine founders, Sidney Miller Jr. and Susan Miller; they started publishing Black Radio Exclusive, popularly known as BRE Magazine in 1976. Miller attended the Brentwood School in Brentwood, California, graduating in 1998. He then went to college at University of Florida.

== Career ==
=== Early career ===
While attending school at University of Florida in Gainesville, Florida, Miller first honed his production skills by creating his own studio and label. During his four years of school, he worked with a variety of local acts including Big Bud, The Strugglazz, Shorty Roc, Lil Po and Dieng Breed.

=== 2003–2010: Malbec ===
Following his college graduation, Miller moved back to Los Angeles. In 2003, Miller met Pablo Signori and quickly began a musical relationship that would turn into the band, Malbec. Until the band's dissolution in 2011, they put out seven EP's and one full-length album, cutting out their own niche of pop rock, hip hop and electronic music. The group was particularly active between 2005 and 2009. They signed a publishing deal with Songs Music Publishing in 2007.

Malbec toured all over the country with bands like Mutemath, Mat Kearney, OneRepublic, Under the Influence of Giants, Phantom Planet, Rock Kills Kid, Copeland, The Knux, and Tally Hall. They appeared on a number of TV shows and movie soundtracks, including One Tree Hill, Flight of the Phoenix, The Omen, Palo Alto, Kyle XY, Dirty Sexy Money, My Best Friend's Girl and Chuck.

=== 2005–2007: First major production placements ===
Around 2005, Miller got his first big break in the industry when he joined the production team known as Soul Diggaz, who at the time had just inked a production deal with Missy Elliott. He also worked with artists like Olivia and Jully Black. His first major label placement would come on Jully's This Is Me album with the song "Stay The Night". Later in 2005, Miller got another major placement on Lupe Fiasco's debut album, Food & Liquor, with the song "What It Do", which was also produced by Brandon Howard. Miller also got to work on Korn frontman, Jonathan Davis' solo album, which ended up being shelved.

=== 2007–present: Working with Freddie Gibbs and The Sharpshootaz ===
In 2007, Miller began producing under the name, "Speakerbomb". That year, Miller met rap artist Freddie Gibbs through friends Josh The Goon and The Knux, who were labelmates with him at Interscope Records. The two started working together and their relationship developed into a slew of songs that would be released on Freddie's subsequent mixtapes, MidwestGangstaBoxFrameCadillacMuzik, The Labels Tryin To Kill Me! and Str8 Killa No Filla. Miller, along with Josh The Goon, produced the first single, "National Anthem", off of Freddie's first official label release of the Str8 Killa EP on Decon Records through Sony. Josh The Goon and Miller produce tracks together under the moniker L.A. Riot Music.

In 2010, Miller linked up with former RedZone Entertainment head, Laney Stewart, to join Stewart's new up and coming The Sharpshootaz production/songwriting team. In June 2011, he signed a publishing deal through The Sharpshootaz with Universal Music Publishing Group and Stewart Music Group.

In June 2011, Sunspot Jonz of Living Legends released his Galaxy of Dreams album with three songs that Miller produced, "Beat The Beat", "Return Of Animalface", and "Like A Phantom (The Fake Jimmy Swaggert Theme)".

In the Fall of 2011, Miller had a song, "Look Easy", with Freddie Gibbs that was the 2K Sports' NBA 2K12 video game, as well as another Gibbs song called "Executive Decision", which was released on the A3C Vol. 1 Compilation. He also produced the song, "Neighborhood Hoez", from Freddie Gibbs' Cold Day In Hell Mixtape.

The Sharpshootaz linked up with Jesse McCartney in late 2011 to record several songs for his next album, including "Out Of Words", which was leaked in July 2012. The songs were all written by The Sharpshootaz, including Alex Jacke, Gabriel Nowee and Romika Faniel, and Jesse McCartney himself, with production from Laney Stewart and co-production from Miller as a member of the Sharpshootaz.

Miller worked with Laney Stewart and The Sharpshootaz on their writing crew's first internal artist, Alex Jacke, who is a fellow Sharpshootaz writer along with Miller. The work culminated in the release of Alex Jacke's EP, entitled D.F.M. on July 9, 2012. Miller co-produced the entire EP as a member of The Sharpshootaz and co-wrote two of the songs on the EP, "Callin For You" and "Enjoy The Ride". In February 2013, Miller co-produced and co-wrote on 5 of the songs on Alex Jacke's D.F.M. Deluxe release.

In late 2014, Miller joined Freddie Gibbs at his ESGN Records as Producer/Engineer. They released a critically acclaimed EP, named "Pronto", on March 9, 2015 through Gibbs' ESGN imprint through Empire Distribution. Later on November 20 of 2015, the pair followed up the EP with a critically acclaimed full-length album, called Shadow of a Doubt, on which he co-produced all but one of the songs with a slew of heavyweight producers including Boi-1da, Frank Dukes, Tarentino of 808 Mafia, Kaytranada and Sledgren. He produced two songs on the album by himself, including "10 Times", which was released as a single featuring Gucci Mane and E-40. In 2016, Freddie Gibbs released a pair of songs together on January 13, 2016, called "Dead Presidents Freestyle" and "Hot Boys".

== Discography ==
2005

Jully Black – This is Me

- "Stay The Night"

Lupe Fiasco – Food & Liquor

- "What It Do"

Malbec – Malbec EP

2006

Malbec – Keep It A Secret EP

2007

Malbec – Dawn Of Our Age

2008

Malbec – Answering Machine EP's (1-5)

2009

Freddie Gibbs – MidwestGangstaBoxFrameCadillacMuzik

- "County Bounce"
- "Murda On My Mind"

Freddie Gibbs – The Labels Tryin To Kill Me!

- "County Bounce"
- "Murda On My Mind"

2010

Freddie Gibbs – Str8 Killa EP

- "National Anthem"

Freddie Gibbs – National Anthem EP

- "National Anthem"

Freddie Gibbs – Str8 Killa No Filla Mixtape

- "National Anthem (Fuck The World)"
- "Best Friend"
- "Slangin' Rocks"
- "4681 Broadway"

B. Howard – Genesis

- "Take It Slow"
- "Dancefloor"

2011

Sunspot Jonz (of Living Legends) – Galaxy Of Dreams (Revenge Entertainment)

- "Bump The Beat"
- "The Return of AnimalFace"
- "Like A Phantom (The Fake Jimmy Swaggert Theme)"

Alex Jacke – D.F.M. (Independent)

- "Callin For You"
- "Enjoy The Ride"

2013

Alex Jacke – D.F.M. Deluxe

- "Callin For You"
- "Enjoy The Ride"
- "No Hands"
- "Love To Love Ya"
- "We Should Have Sex"

2015

Freddie Gibbs – Shadow of a Doubt

=== Track listing ===
No.	Title	Producer(s)	Length
1.	"Rearview"	Blair Norf, Sid "Speakerbomb" Miller	3:57
2.	"Narcos"	Blair Norf, Sid "Speakerbomb" Miller	3:07
3.	"Careless"	Pops, Superville, Sid "Speakerbomb" Miller	3:46
4.	"Fuckin' up the Count"	Boi-1da, Frank Dukes, Sid "Speakerbomb" Miller	3:21
5.	"Extradite" (featuring Black Thought)	Mikhail, Sid "Speakerbomb" Miller	4:39
6.	"McDuck" (featuring Dana Williams)	Sid "Speakerbomb" Miller	3:28
7.	"Mexico" (featuring Tory Lanez)	Murda Beatz, Sid "Speakerbomb" Miller	4:12
8.	"Packages" (featuring ManMan Savage)	Tarentino of 808 Mafia, Sid "Speakerbomb" Miller	3:48
9.	"10 Times" (featuring Gucci Mane & E-40)	Sid "Speakerbomb" Miller	3:30
10.	"Lately"	Superville, 6-18, Superdriiv, Sid "Speakerbomb" Miller	3:55
11.	"Basketball Wives"	Bentley Haze, Sid "Speakerbomb" Miller	4:09
12.	"Forever and a Day"	J Reid, Sid "Speakerbomb" Miller	4:36
13.	"Insecurities"	Kaytranada, Frank Dukes, Sid "Speakerbomb" Miller	4:26
14.	"Freddie Gordy"	Blair Norf, Sid "Speakerbomb" Miller	3:51
15.	"Cold Ass Nigga"	Mike Dean	3:53
16.	"My Boy"	Sledgren, Sid "Speakerbomb" Miller	4:30
17.	"10 Chickens"	Pops, Mikhail, Sid "Speakerbomb" Miller	2:38

== Song placements in media ==
Malbec "Solstice"

- Flight Of The Phoenix

20th Century Fox 2004

Malbec "Solstice"

- Long Way Round

Bravo 2005

Malbec "To Be Continued"

- The Omen

20th Century Fox 2006

Malbec "Solstice"

- One Tree Hill

The CW 2006

Malbec "Blue"

- Palo Alto

Independent 2007

Malbec "Given The Times"

- The Sims: Pet Stories 2

Electronic Arts 2007

Malbec "Blue"

- My Best Friend's Girl

Lionsgate 2008

Malbec "Keep It A Secret"

- Kyle XY

ABC Family 2008

Malbec "Irene Song"

- Dirty Sexy Money

ABC 2009

Malbec "Answering Machine"

- Chuck

NBC 2010

Freddie Gibbs "Look Easy"

- NBA 2K12

2K Sports 2011
