= Alex Jacke =

American singer

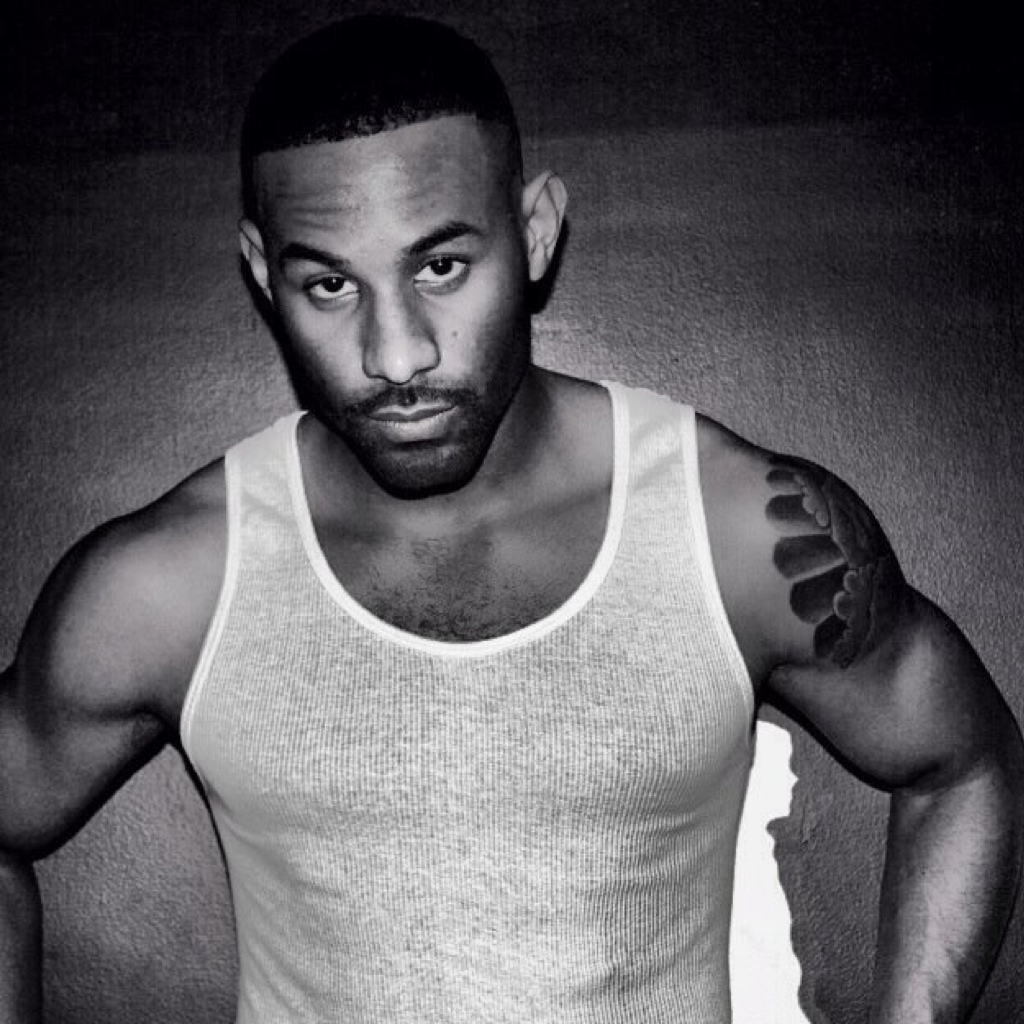
- Alex Jacke

Background information
- Born: May 15, 1989 (age 37); Los Feliz, California, United States
- Origin: Los Angeles, California, United States
- Genres: R&B, pop, dance, soul, hip hop Orgasmic R&B
- Occupation: Singer-songwriter
- Instruments: Vocals, piano
- Years active: 1999–present
- Label: Independent
- Website: www.alexjacke.com

Alex Jacke in an American singer-songwriter. He was born and raised in the Los Feliz neighborhood of Los Angeles, CA. During his sophomore year, he appeared on the highly popular MTV series "My Super Sweet 16," as the special guest performer for DJ Spinderella and former NBA player, Kenny Anderson's daughter, Christy. Jacke left Morehouse College to return to Los Angeles. Like others before him, most notably Tricky Stewart and The-Dream. Laney Stewart took Jacke under his wing which led Jacke to land a worldwide publishing deal with Music Gallery/Universal Music Publishing Group in 2011. Along with Stewart and his production team The Sharpshootaz, Jacke spent most of the first half of 2012 perfecting his debut EP, D.F.M. (Dorm Fuckin Music) released on July 9, 2012. On Valentine's Day 2013, Jacke released a "Deluxe" version of his D.F.M. release, simply titled "D.F.M. Deluxe".

== Music career ==
After building a YouTube following doing singing cover songs, in May 2012, Jacke dropped his first single, "One Thing", which was eventually followed with the release of his "D.F.M." EP in July 2012 and then with the further release of "D.F.M. Deluxe" in February 2013. During the summer of 2013, he was selected as a top 5 finalist for Macy's and iHeart Radio's Rising Star contest where he performed at L.A.'s iHeart Radio Festival. He returned again in December 2013 to release a single called "Sex Is Amazing and then again in 2014, releasing another single, "Apart", on March 3, 2014.

== Songwriting ==
In late 2011, Jacke went in the studio with his fellow Sharpshootaz members and Laney Stewart to work on songs for Jesse McCartney's latest album. One of the songs that Alex co-wrote, "Out Of Words", was leaked in July 2012

== Discography ==
- D.F.M. - EP (2012)
- D.F.M. Deluxe - Album (2013)
- Sex Is Amazing - Single (2013)
- Apart - Single (2014)

== Track listing & personnel ==
D.F.M.

- Produced by Laney Stewart
- Co-Produced by The Sharpshootaz
- Mixed by Mark "Exit" Goodchild
- Recorded by Derek Yopp
- Effects & Sound Design by Andrew Kim
- Sound Production & Sound Design by Sidney Miller

No.	Title	Writer(s)	Length
1.	"Talk Sexy (Skit)"	n/a	2:42
2.	"One Thing"	Alex Jacke, Laney Stewart	3:34
3.	"Callin For You"	Alex Jacke, Laney Stewart, Sidney Miller, Glynn Austin Tolliver, Gabriel Nowee	4:54
4.	"Nobody's Perfect"	Laney Stewart, Matt Robinson	4:19
5.	"Enjoy The Ride"	Alex Jacke, Laney Stewart, Sidney Miller	5:39
6.	"All She Wrote"	Alex Jacke, Laney Stewart, J. Rutherford, C. Bernardy, L. Wade, P. Houston, J. Dorr	3:19
7.	"Cheers (Skit)"	n/a	0:42
8.	"Days Of Our Lives"	Alex Jacke, Laney Stewart, Romika Faniel, Gabriel Nowee	3:55

D.F.M. Deluxe

- Produced by Laney Stewart
- Co-Produced by The Sharpshootaz
- Mixed by Mark "Exit" Goodchild
- Recorded by Derek Yopp
- Effects & Sound Design by Andrew Kim
- Sound Production & Sound Design by Sidney Miller

No.	Title	Writer(s)	Length
1.	"Talk Sexy (Skit)"	n/a	2:42
2.	"One Thing"	Alex Jacke, Laney Stewart	3:34
3.	"Callin For You"	Alex Jacke, Laney Stewart, Sidney Miller, Glynn Austin Tolliver, Gabriel Nowee	4:54
4.	"Nobody's Perfect"	Laney Stewart, Matt Robinson	4:19
5.	"Enjoy The Ride"	Alex Jacke, Laney Stewart, Sidney Miller	5:39
6.	"All She Wrote"	Alex Jacke, Laney Stewart, J. Rutherford, C. Bernardy, L. Wade, P. Houston, J. Dorr	3:19
7.	"Cheers (Skit)"	n/a	0:42
8.	"Days Of Our Lives"	Alex Jacke, Laney Stewart, Romika Faniel, Gabriel Nowee	3:55
9.	"No Hands"	Alex Jacke, Laney Stewart, Sidney Miller	4:00
10.	"Love To Love Ya"	Alex Jacke, Laney Stewart, G. Toliver, Sidney Miller	3:38
11.	"We Should Have Sex"	Alex Jacke, Laney Stewart, Sidney Miller, A. Kim, T. Perry, A. Vertel	3:27
12.	"Pure Perfection"	Alex Jacke, Laney Stewart, Romika Faniel, C. Stewart	4:16

No.	Title	Length

== TV ==
In 2012, Jacke acted in MTV's My Super Sweet Sixteen
