= Kissing You (Keith Washington song) =

Single by Keith Washington

from the album Make Time for Love
- Released: 1991
- Recorded: 1990
- Genre: R&B; soul
- Label: Qwest
- Songwriters: Keith Washington; Marsha Jenkins; Rodney Shelton
- Producers: Keith Washington; Trey Stone; Jon Nettlesbey; Terry Coffey; A&R - Raoul Roach

Keith Washington singles chronology
"Kissing You" (1991)	"Are You Still in Love with Me" (1991)

"Kissing You" is a song by American R&B singer Keith Washington, released in 1991 by Qwest Records as his debut single from his first album, Make Time for Love (1991). It is both co-written and co-produced by Washington and spent one week at number one on the US Billboard Hot R&B/Hip-Hop Songs chart. It also peaked at numbers 40 and 58 on the Billboard Hot 100 and Cash Box Top 100 charts. "Kissing You" won a Soul Train Music Award for Best R&B/Soul Single, Male.

== Charts ==
Chart (1991)	Peak position
UK Dance (Music Week)	36
US Billboard Hot 100	40
US Hot R&B/Hip-Hop Songs (Billboard)	1
US Cash Box Top 100	58

== See also ==
- List of number-one R&B singles of 1991 (U.S.)
