= Louil Silas Jr. =

American record executive (1956–2001)

Louil Silas Jr. (April 17, 1956 – January 7, 2001) was an American record executive, musician, and record producer, who was most known for founding and running an MCA Records imprint, Silas Records. After a prolific career as a remixer, Silas became a respected record label executive responsible for bringing Chanté Moore, Jesse Powell, Keke Wyatt, London Jones, and Tricky Stewart to prominence as well as working with Aaron Hall.

== Early career ==
After attending California State University Silas, who had a musical gift, initially tried his hand as a singer, but found much more success as a DJ, remixing other records in the late 1970s. By the 1980s, he was in demand as a remixer, adding club heavy or hip-hop electronic percussion sounds to a previously recorded song. At one point, his remixes were so in demand, other labels would contract him under the alias "ELLIS JAY". After working for MCA Records in promotion, he rose through the ranks, and is credited with much of the success of the black artists on that label. By the later 1980s, Silas had produced records with Babyface, Bobby Brown, Sheena Easton, Pebbles, Patti LaBelle, and worked for another MCA imprint, SOLAR Records, as a music executive, and after helping with their success, and executive producing Bell Biv Devoe's debut album, got the green light to found his own imprint, which he named Silas Records.

== Silas Records ==
After starting his label, he had to find a roster of talent, being careful to select talent he could nurture into artists. Using Berry Gordy as a blueprint, he first signed Aaron Hall, then of Guy fame to a solo deal. While initially a model and beauty pageant contestant, Silas discovered Chanté Moore, and signed her. While music was moving in the direction of New Jack Swing, Silas kept Moore, a gospel and jazz trained singer, under then more “traditional R&B”. So determined was he to expose her under the right light, for the music video treatment for her debut single, "Love's Taken Over", Silas spent the money to have the shoot in Paris by movie director Antoine Fuqua. The video, showcasing a series of “modeling shoots” of Moore, including one of her in a designer gown along the Avenue des Champs-Élysées, helped establish Moore as a seductive, emotive vocalist, with exotic looks, a sultry voice and a range to recall Minnie Riperton.

After Moore, Silas signed Jesse Powell, Keke Wyatt, and London Jones. After being introduced by his older brother Laney, Silas had Tricky Stewart write and produce for his artists.

In 1999, after Polygram and MCA Records merged, Silas Records was “absorbed” by MCA. Artists signed to the label released either directly under MCA, or in the case of Keke Wyatt, Magic Johnson Music, another imprint of MCA.

== Later career ==
He then accepted a position as Senior Vice President of LaFace Records West Coast division, or LaFace West. It is a position he would keep for the remainder of his life. Among his final actions was to help Tricky establish Blu Cantrell.

== Death ==
Silas died of kidney failure on January 7, 2001 at his home in Los Angeles, after being in ill health for a time.

== Roster ==
- Chanté Moore
- Gyrl
- Jesse Powell
- London Jones
- Keith Washington
- Keke Wyatt
