= Saddle Ranch Chop House =

American restaurant

- Company type: Restaurant
- Founded: 1999
- Headquarters: Los Angeles, United States
- Website: www.thesaddleranch.com

Saddle Ranch Chop House is an American restaurant founded in September 1999 as a Western-themed restaurant.

== History ==
The first location was on the Sunset Strip in West Hollywood, California. The restaurant became famous for bringing a Western feel to the trendy, upscale location. Each restaurant features a mechanical bull that patrons can attempt to ride. The restaurant has appeared many times in popular culture, showing up on TV shows such as Sex and the City, The Bachelor and Desperate Housewives. In 2013, Business Insider named it the rowdiest bar in the United States.

== Locations ==
There is currently one location:

- West Hollywood, California

== Reality show ==
In 2011, VH1 began airing a reality show that follows the lives of 11 of the staff from both Los Angeles locations. Saddle Ranch premiered on April 17 as part of VH1.
