= It's You That I Need =

Single by Enchantment

from the album Once Upon A Dream
- B-side: "Sunny Shine Feeling"
- Released: 1978
- Recorded: 1977
- Genre: Soul
- Length: 6:00 (album version); 3:56 (single edit)
- Label: Roadshow Records/United Artists Records
- Songwriter(s): Michael Stokes & Verdell Lanier
- Producer(s): Michael Stokes

Enchantment singles chronology
"Sunshine" (1977)	"It's You That I Need" (1978)	"If You're Ready (Here It Comes)" (1978)

"It's You That I Need" is a hit song by Detroit R&B vocal group Enchantment, and was their most successful song. Released from their 1977 LP, Once Upon A Dream, it spent a week at number one on the Hot Soul Singles chart in February 1978 and peaked at number thirty-three on the Billboard Hot 100.

== Chart positions ==
Chart (1978)	Peak position
U.S. Billboard Hot Soul Singles	1
U.S. Billboard Hot 100	33
