= Jesse Powell =

American singer (1970–2022)

- Born: September 12, 1970; Gary, Indiana, U.S.
- Died: September 13, 2022 (aged 52) Los Angeles, California, U.S.
- Genres: R&B; soul
- Occupation: Singer
- Years active: 1988–2003
- Labels: MCA; Riviera/Liquid 8

Jesse Alexander Powell III (September 12, 1970 – September 13, 2022) was an American R&B and soul singer. Discovered by Louil Silas Jr., Powell was best known for his hit "You", which peaked at No. 2 on the R&B chart and No. 10 on the Billboard Hot 100. Powell released four albums and was the older brother of fellow contemporary R&B singers Trina & Tamara. Powell was credited with a four-octave vocal range. He was a Grammy nominee.

== Life and career ==
Powell was born in Gary, Indiana, and raised with his siblings Trina, Tamara and Jacob. The family performed in local talent shows; and, in 1993, he attracted the attention of producer Carl Roland in Kansas City. Following an artist showcase, Louil Silas signed him to his Silas Records imprint.

Three years later, he completed work on his debut album. His first single, "All I Need", was written by Powell, Sam Salter and Laney Stewart and was released in March 1996, peaking at #20 on the Billboard R&B chart. His self-titled album was released on March 12, 1996, opening at #35 on the Billboard R&B and #32 on the Billboard Heatseekers chart. The follow-up single, a remake of the 1976 Enchantment song "Gloria", reached #51 R&B.

Powell then began work on his second album, debuting the lead single "I Wasn't with It" in 1998, which became his first single to chart on the Billboard Hot 100 (#85 US, #25 R&B). Bolstered by the success of the single, his second album 'Bout It was released on September 8, 1998, topping the Heatseekers chart. The album's second single, "You", was released in February 1999 and became his biggest hit, peaking at #2 on the Billboard Hot R&B/Hip Hop Songs chart and #10 on the Billboard Hot 100. The record was certified gold by the RIAA, peaking at #15 on R&B and #63 on the Billboard 200.

Following Silas Records' merge into MCA Records, Powell's first release on the label was the single "If I" in 2000, which peaked at No. 58 on the R&B chart. His third studio album, JP, was released on March 27, 2001, opening at #18 on the R&B chart and #71 on the Billboard 200. A second single, "Something in the Past" (#67 R&B), followed, in addition to Powell doing some promotion for the release. In 2002, he left the label and signed with Riviera Records. His fourth studio album, Jesse, was released on October 14, 2003, and was supported by the singles "By the Way" (#99 R&B) and "Touching It Tonight" (#85 R&B).

== Death ==
Powell died in his Los Angeles home on September 13, 2022, a day after his 52nd birthday from a methamphetamine overdose.

== Discography ==
=== Studio albums ===
Title	Album details	Peak positions			Certifications
Title	Album details	US 200	US R&B	US Heat	Certifications
Jesse Powell	Released: March 12, 1996; Label: Silas, MCA; Formats: CD, cassette	35	32	—	
'Bout It	Released: September 8, 1998; Label: Silas, MCA; Formats: CD, cassette	63	15	1	US: Gold
JP	Released: March 27, 2001; Label: Silas, MCA; Formats: CD, digital download	71	18	—	
Jesse	Released: October 14, 2003; Label: D3, Monopoly, Riviera; Formats: CD, digital download	—	85	—	

=== Compilation albums ===
Title	Album details	Peak positions			Certifications
Title	Album details	US 200	US R&B	US Heat	Certifications
A Soulful Holiday 1999	Released: 1999; Label: Universal; Formats: CD	—	—	—	

=== Singles ===
Year	Title	Peak positions			Album
Year	Title	US	US R&B	US CHR	Album
1996	"All I Need"	—	32	—	Jesse Powell
1996	"Gloria"	—	51	—	Jesse Powell
1996	"I Like It"	—	—	—	Jesse Powell
1998	"I Wasn't with It"	85	25	—	'Bout It
1999	"You"	10	2	27	'Bout It
1999	"'Bout It, 'Bout It"	—	—	—	'Bout It
2000	"If I"	—	58	—	JP
2001	"Something in the Past"	—	67	—	JP
2001	"I'm Leaving"	—	—	—	JP
2003	"By the Way"	—	99	—	Jesse
2003	"Touching It Tonight"	—	—	—	Jesse
