= Creative Source =

American R&B group

- Origin: Los Angeles
- Genres: R&B, funk, disco
- Years active: 1973–1976
- Labels: Sussex, Polydor
- Past members: Barbara Berryman; Barbara Lewis; Don Wyatt; Steve Flanagan; Celeste Rose

Creative Source was an American R&B group from Los Angeles, who had several funk and disco hits during the 1970s.

== History ==
Creative Source was formed in 1972 by several veterans of the West Coast recording studios. They were managed by Ron Townson, who was a member of The Fifth Dimension. Their first chart success was 1973's "You Can't Hide Love", but their biggest hit came the following year, a cover of the Bill Withers tune "Who Is He (And What Is He to You)?". Four albums were issued by the band in three years, but their later singles were less successful, and by 1977, after having lost their recording contract, the group disbanded.

== Discography ==
=== Albums ===
Year	Album	Label	Peak chart positions	
Year	Album	Label	US 200	US R&B
1973	Creative Source	Sussex	152	21
1974	Migration	Sussex	—	28
1975	Pass the Feelin' On	Polydor	—	49
1976	Consider the Source	Polydor	—	—
"—" denotes releases that did not chart or were not released.

=== Singles ===
Year	Title	Chart Positions	
Year	Title	US Hot 100	US R&B
1973	"You Can't Hide Love"	114	48
1973	"Who Is He (And What Is He to You)?"	69	21
1973	"You're Too Good to Be True"	108	88
1974	"Keep on Movin'"	—	—
1974	"Migration"	—	62
1974	"Harlem"	—	—
1975	"Pass the Feelin' On"	—	92
1975	"I'm Gonna Get There"	—	—
1975	"Don't Be Afraid (Take My Love)"	—	—
"—" denotes releases that did not chart or were not released.
