= Enchantment (band) =

American rhythm and blues band

- Origin: Detroit, Michigan, U.S.
- Genres: Soul, R&B
- Years active: 1967–present
- Labels: Roadshow Records; United Artists Records; RCA Records; Columbia Records
- Members: Emanuel "EJ" Johnson; Walter Jones; Mickey Clanton; Joe "Jobie" Thomas; Dave Banks
- Past members: Bobby Green; Carl Cotton; Lacey Robinson

Enchantment is a soul/R&B band formed in Detroit, Michigan by Emanuel "EJ" Johnson, Joe "Jobie" Thomas, Bobby Green, Edgar "Mickey" Clanton, and David Banks. They are best known for their mid-1970s hits "Gloria", "Sunshine" and "It's You That I Need".

== History ==
=== Beginnings ===
Enchantment was formed in the late 1960s at Detroit's Pershing High School, with the visually impaired Emanuel "EJ" Johnson as their lead singer. In 1971, Enchantment came to the attention of Dick Scott, a former Motown executive who headed his own artist development company, Artists International. In 1973, they formed an alliance with Michael Stokes, producer of Creative Source's hit "Who Is He (And What Is He To You)".

=== Success ===
By 1976, Stokes had negotiated a recording deal through his association with Fred Frank, then head of Roadshow Records, who was also guiding the careers of B.T. Express and Brass Construction. After their disco-oriented song "Come On And Ride", the band changed their focus to writing ballads. Their self-titled debut album, Enchantment, contained two singles in that vein, which charted well on the Billboard R&B chart – "Gloria" at number five and "Sunshine" at number three.

Their second album, Once Upon a Dream, far surpassed its predecessor by charting at No. 8 on the R&B albums chart and at No. 46 on the Pop albums charts. It featured the crossover ballad "It's You That I Need", which topped the R&B charts. Overall, their attempts to diversify their sound by appealing to the disco audience failed, but their song "If You're Ready (Here It Comes)" reached No. 14 on the R&B charts. In 1978, Roadshow ended its distribution agreement with United Artists and formed an alliance with RCA Records. In 1979, Enchantment released their third album, Journey to the Land Of... Enchantment, which was their final recording with Roadshow Records.

=== Decline ===
By 1980, Roadshow had folded as a label and Enchantment signed with RCA Records, where they recorded their fourth album, Soft Lights, Sweet Music, with top R&B producer Don Davis. Both singles released charted at No. 47 in the 1981 charts. In 1982, they signed with Columbia Records and released two more albums: Enchanted Lady (1982) and Utopia (1984). By the end of the 1980s, the rise of funk and rap put a virtual end to ballad groups. All three albums barely dented the charts.

=== Recent work ===
In 2003, Enchantment released "God Bless America", in honor of troops fighting in Iraq. Proceeds from the single benefited the United Way. Jobie Thomas later left the group and has formed his own group known as Enchantment featuring Jobie Thomas.

== Discography ==
=== Studio albums ===
Year	Title	Peak chart positions		Record label
Year	Title	US	US R&B	Record label
1977	Enchantment	104	11	Roadshow/United Artists
1978	Once Upon a Dream	46	8	Roadshow/United Artists
1979	Journey to the Land Of... Enchantment	145	25	Roadshow
1980	Soft Lights, Sweet Music	202	65	RCA
1982	Enchanted Lady	—	—	Columbia
1983	Utopia	—	—	Columbia
"—" denotes releases that did not chart or were not released in that territory.

=== Compilation albums ===
- Golden Classics (1991, Collectables)
- If You're Ready... The Best of Enchantment (1996, EMI)
- Sunshine: The Enchantment Anthology (1975–1984) (2017, Big Break)

=== Singles ===
Year	Title	Peak chart positions				Album
Year	Title	US	US R&B	US Dan	CAN	Album
1975	"Call on Me"	—	—	—	—	Deliver Us from Evil
1976	"Come on and Ride"	—	67	37	—	Enchantment
1976	"Gloria"	25	5	—	44	Enchantment
1977	"Sunshine"	45	3	—	—	Enchantment
1978	"It's You That I Need"	33	1	—	—	Once Upon a Dream
1978	"If You're Ready (Here It Comes)"	—	14	—	—	Once Upon a Dream
1979	"Anyway You Want It"	109	38	—	—	Journey to the Land Of... Enchantment
1979	"Where Do We Go from Here"	—	29	—	—	Journey to the Land Of... Enchantment
1979	"Forever More"	—	—	—	—	Journey to the Land Of... Enchantment
1980	"Settin' It Out"	—	—	47	—	Soft Lights, Sweet Music
1981	"Moment of Weakness"	—	47	—	—	Soft Lights, Sweet Music
1982	"I Know Your Hot Spot"	—	45	—	—	Enchanted Lady
1982	"I Can't Forget You"	—	—	—	—	Enchanted Lady
1982	"Enchanted Lady"	—	—	—	—	Enchanted Lady
1983	"Here's Your Chance"	—	—	—	—	Utopia
1984	"Don't Fight the Feeling"	—	64	—	—	Utopia
1985	"Feel Like Dancin'"	—	—	—	—	non-album track
"—" denotes releases that did not chart or were not released in that territory.
