= Keith Washington =

American singer (born 1960)

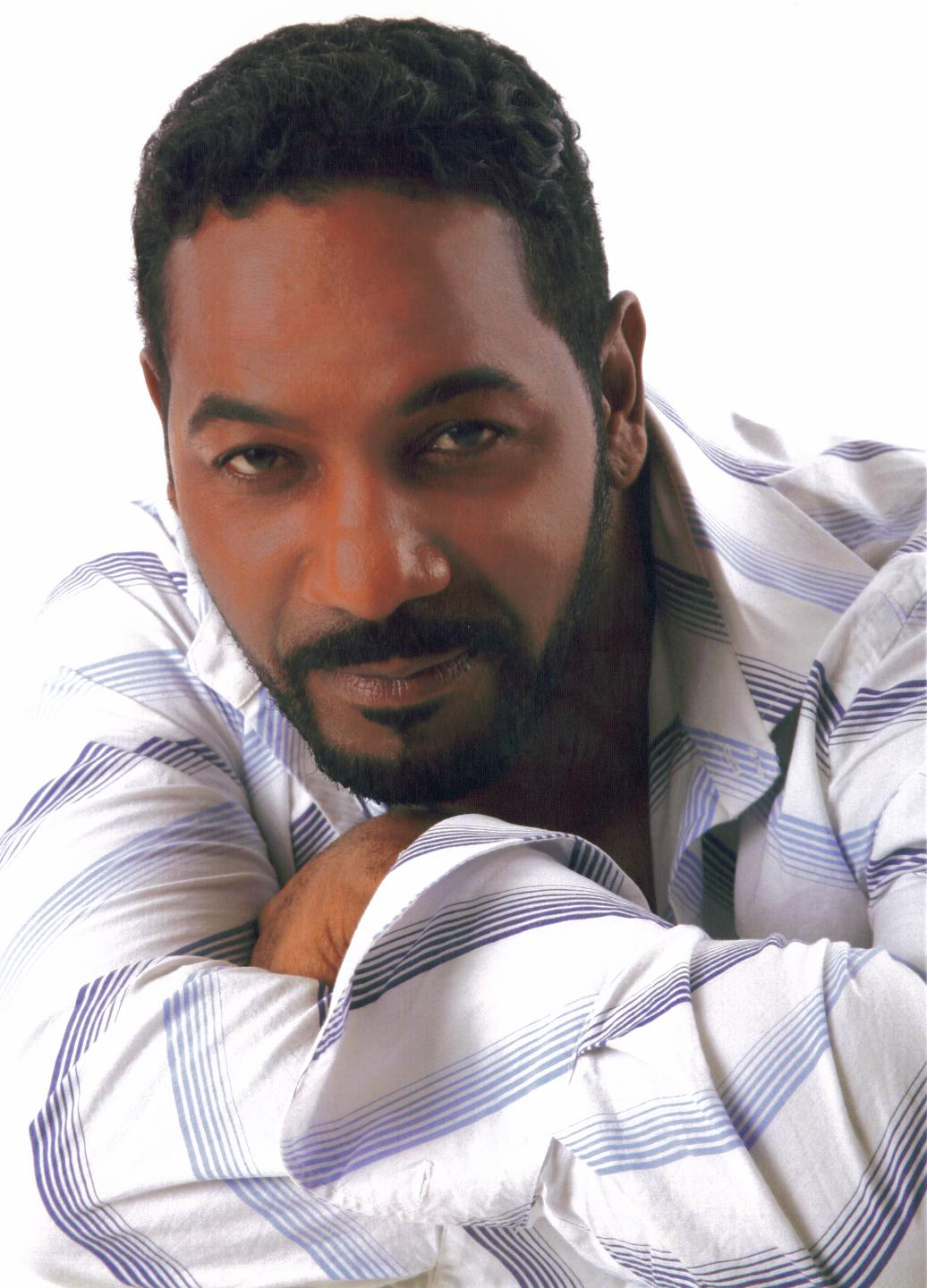

Background information
- Born: Keith Douglas Washington; November 15, 1960 (age 65); Detroit, Michigan, U.S.
- Genres: R&B; soul; jazz
- Occupations: Singer; songwriter; producer; actor
- Years active: 1988–present
- Labels: Qwest; MCA

Keith Douglas Washington (born November 15, 1960) is an American R&B vocalist from Detroit best known for his 1991 hit single "Kissing You". The song was also used as background music for the ABC television soap opera General Hospital. "Kissing You" was nominated for a Grammy Award for Best R&B Vocal Performance Male and won a 1992 Soul Train Music Award for Best R&B/Soul Single – Male. The song also topped the Billboard Hot R&B/Hip-Hop Songs chart for one week.

== Biography ==
Prior to his success as a recording act, Washington earned recognition as a songwriter, co-writing Freddie Jackson's 1988 number one R&B hit "Hey Lover". Within three years, Washington had scored a contract as a solo artist, releasing his debut album, Make Time for Love, in 1991. In addition to "Kissing You", the album featured a number of successful follow-up R&B singles. He also recorded a duet with Kylie Minogue, their co-composition "If You Were with Me Now", in 1991 (on PWL Records), which reached number 4 in the UK Singles Chart and number 23 in Minogue's native Australia. In 1992, Washington’s song “Tonight Is Right” appeared on the movie soundtrack of the Eddie Murphy film Boomerang. Washington was featured on a song with Chante Moore “Candlelight and You” which appeared on the movie soundtrack of the film, House Party 2 in 1992. Washington's follow-up album, You Make It Easy appeared in 1993, though its success paled in comparison to the debut. It would be another five years before Washington released his third album, KW, which featured the minor single, "Bring It On".

Washington branched out in a few acting roles, starring as himself on the television series Martin in an episode called "A Woman with a Past" which featured him singing a duet with Tisha Campbell-Martin titled "The Closer I Get to You", a classic ballad performed and made famous in 1978 by Roberta Flack and Donny Hathaway. Additionally, Keith had a brief role in the TV soap opera General Hospital as Keith Jasper. Appearing alongside lead actress Janet Jackson, he also had a brief role in John Singleton's Poetic Justice, as a hairdresser named Dexter.

Washington's first marriage was to Marsha Jenkins and ended in divorce and resulted in her writing The Other Side of Through, a book loosely based on Jenkins' marriage to Washington and her experiences with the singer's marital infidelities. In June 2009, Washington married his longtime girlfriend, Stephanie Grimes, who is general sales manager for WGPR-FM 107.5 in Detroit. He also revealed his plans to release a new album. Washington has since branched out into radio himself, as he now hosts the nighttime "Slow Jams" show "Kisses After Dark" on Detroit radio station WDMK-FM 105.9 (Kiss-FM).

As of 2025, Washington is still performing in concerts and he is still on tour today.

== Discography ==
=== Studio albums ===
Title	Album details	Peak positions	
Title	Album details	US	US R&B
Make Time for Love	Released: April 16, 1991; Label: Qwest, Warner Bros.	48	1
You Make It Easy	Released: September 21, 1993; Label: Qwest, Warner Bros.	100	15
KW	Released: March 10, 1998; Label: Silas	125	27

=== Singles ===
Title	Year	Peak positions				Album
Title	Year	US	US R&B	AUS	UK	Album
"Kissing You"	1991	40	1	—	—	Make Time for Love
"Are You Still in Love with Me"	1991	—	15	—	—	Make Time for Love
"If You Were with Me Now" (duet with Kylie Minogue)	1991	—	—	23	4	Let's Get to It
"Make Time for Love"	1992	—	22	—	—	Make Time for Love
"When You Love Somebody"	1992	—	26	—	—	Make Time for Love
"Stay in My Corner"	1993	—	34	—	—	You Make It Easy
"Believe That"	1994	—	30	—	—	You Make It Easy
"Trippin'"	1994	—	77	—	—	You Make It Easy
"Bring It On"	1998	63	22	—	—	KW
"I Love You" (duet with Chanté Moore)	1998	—	—	—	—	KW
"I Don't Mind"	1998	—	—	—	—	KW
"Thinkin 'Bout You"	2012	—	—	—	—	Non-album single
"—" denotes releases that did not chart or were not released.

=== Soundtracks and appearances ===
Year	Single	Album
1992	"Tonight Is Right"	Boomerang: Original Soundtrack Album
1993	"Is It Just Too Much"	The Meteor Man Original Soundtrack Album
