= Michael Stokes (music producer) =

American record producer and songwriter (born 1955)

- Also known as: Mike Stokes
- Born: Michael Lee Stokes; September 26, 1955 (age 70); Detroit, Michigan, United States
- Genres: R&B, dance, soul, disco, funk
- Occupations: Musician, record producer, songwriter
- Instrument: Keyboards
- Years active: 1970–present
- Labels: Sussex, Roadshow, A&M, Motown

Michael Stokes (born September 26, 1955, in Detroit, Michigan) is an American record producer, former A&M Records executive and songwriter, who is best known for producing Enchantment, working with Janet Jackson and Creative Source.

== Biography ==
Stokes first rose to prominence in the early 1970s working with Clarence Avant on his Sussex Records label, when writing for and producing acts such as Bill Withers, Creative Source, The Soul Searchers, Faith, Hope & Charity, and Dennis Coffey. When Sussex folded in June 1975, Stokes moved over to Roadshow Records. More success came writing and producing Enchantment's first three albums, along with writing songs for Brass Construction, BT Express, Shirley Caesar (1978), and then Nature's Divine on Infinity Records (1979). In the early 1980s, Stokes took over as A&R at A&M Records where he signed Janet Jackson. Stokes has continued to songwrite and produce, working with L.T.D "Kickin' Back"(1981), Active Force (1983), Enchantment (1983), Magic Lady (1988), Sherrick (1987), Patti LaBelle (1991), Morris Day (1992), Smokey Robinson, Gladys Knight, and Jesse Powell. The journalist Paul Grein, who writes for Billboard, also for The Los Angeles Times, The Hollywood Reporter, Yahoo, Stereogum, The Grammy Awards, Hits, and The Tolucan Times quoted Michael Stokes working alongside Herb Alpert, as he said in his own words the "millifluous" 1981 album Magic Man. This quotation is in the inlay details of A&M Classics Volume 20 CD by Herb Alpert (1987), that celebrated the A&M label's 25th anniversary.
