= Silas Records =

- Parent company: Universal Music Group
- Founded: 1991
- Founder: Louil Silas Jr.
- Status: Defunct (absorbed into MCA Records)
- Distributor: Interscope Geffen A&M
- Genre: R&B
- Country of origin: United States

Silas Records was an American record label owned by Universal Music Group; founded in 1991 by Louil Silas Jr. and operated as an imprint of MCA Records, where Silas had been a senior VP. The label achieved minor success throughout the 1990s. It was eventually absorbed into MCA in 1999, after Silas left his post at UMG to take a position at LaFace Records. Its back catalog is now controlled by Geffen Records.

The label's first and last releases were by Chanté Moore in 1992 and 1999. Other artists on the label included Aaron Hall, London Jones, Jesse Powell, and Keith Washington.

== See also ==
- List of record labels
