= Kenny Lattimore discography =

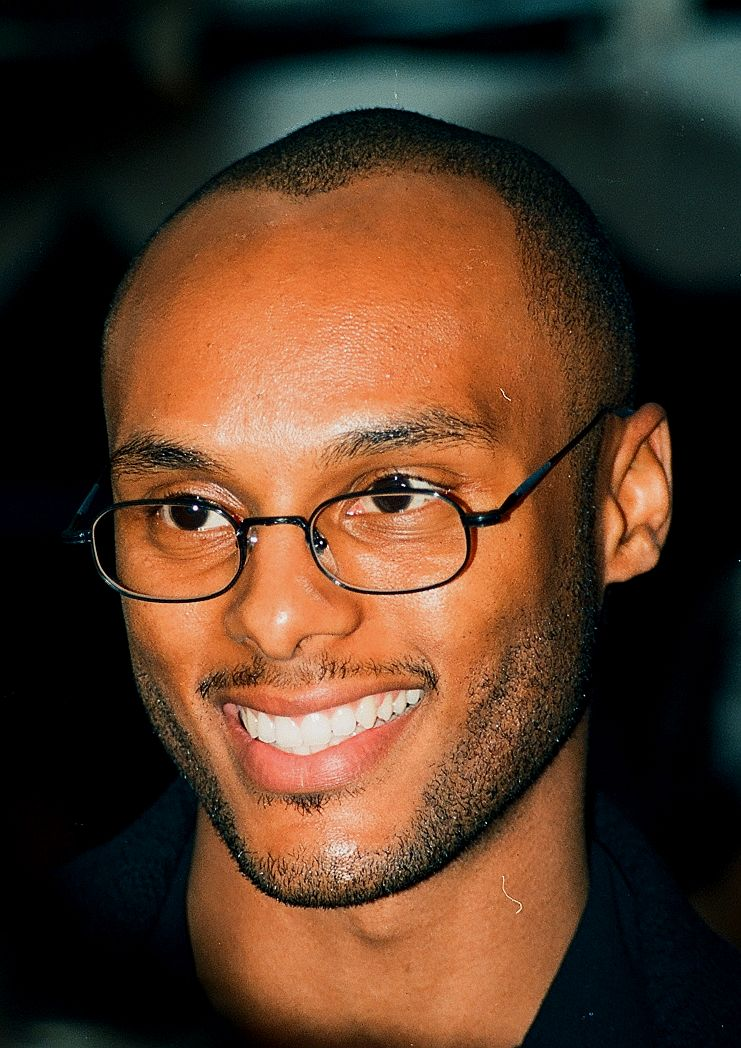
- Lattimore in 1998
- Studio albums: 8
- Compilation albums: 2
- Collaborative albums: 2

American R&B singer Kenny Lattimore has released eight studio albums, two compilation albums, and two compilation albums with his former wife Chanté Moore. After fronting the R&B group Maniquin in the late 1980s to early 1990s, Lattimore left to pursue a solo career, prompting the group's disbandment. He relocated to New York City where he was signed to Columbia Records as a solo act in 1995. A year later, the label released his self-titled debut album, which reached the top 20 on Billboard's Top R&B/Hip-Hop Albums chart and was certified Gold by the Recording Industry Association of America (RIAA). It produced three singles, including the R&B top 20 hit "Never Too Busy" and the top ten peak, "For You."

Lattimore assumed greater creative control on his second album From the Soul of Man, released in 1998. The album peaked at number 71 on the US Billboard 200 and number 15 on the Top R&B/Hip-Hop Albums chart, selling 83,000 copies domestically. While none of its singles impacted on the US Billboard Hot 100, its first two singles "Days Like This" and "If I Lose My Woman" became top ten hits on the Adult R&B Songs chart. In 2001, music executive Clive Davis signed Lattimore to join Arista Records, resulting in Lattimore's third solo album Weekend. Characterized by its more upbeat production and fresh collaborations. it was his first project to miss the top 20 on the R&B/Hip-Hop Albums chart.

In 2003, Arista issued Things That Lovers Do, a collaborative studio album with his then-wife, singer Chanté Moore. Comprising cover versions of classic 1970's and 1980's soul duets, it became the highest-charting album for both singers, reaching number 31 on the US Billboard 200 and number three on the Top R&B/Hip-Hop Albums chart. A second album with Moore, a double album titled Uncovered/Covered, consisting of one disc of R&B songs and another of gospel songs, was released through LaFace and Verity Records in 2006. Although commercially less successful than its predecessor, it marked their debut on the US Top Gospel Albums chart, reaching number two.

After the two duet albums with Moore, Lattimore released Timeless, his own cover album, through Verve Records in 2008. It peaked at number 53 on the Billboard 200, becoming his highest-charting solo album, and marked his first project to reach the R&B/Hip-Hop Albums top ten. Following a hiatus and a period of artistic identity crisis, the singer produced the album Back 2 Cool, which was eventually reworked and released by his own label Sincere Soul in partnership with eOne Music under the title Anatomy of a Love Song. It marked his debut on the US Independent Albums chart, peaking at number ten. Later albums did not achieve the same commercial success, though A Kenny Lattimore Christmas (2016) became another top five success on the Top Gospel Albums. Here to Stay, Lattimore's eighth solo album, failed to chart in 2021. One of its singles, "Take a Dose," marked his second chart topper on the Adult R&B Songs, however.

== Albums ==
=== Studio albums ===
List of studio albums, with selected chart positions and certifications
Title	Album details	Peak chart positions					Certifications
Title	Album details	US	US R&B	US Indie	US Gospel	US Heat	Certifications
Kenny Lattimore	Released: May 14, 1996; Labels: Columbia; Formats: CD	92	19	—	—	1	RIAA: Gold
From the Soul of Man	Released: October 20, 1998; Labels: Columbia; Formats: CD, digital download	71	15	—	—	—	
Weekend	Released: October 9, 2001; Labels: Arista; Formats: CD, digital download	63	24	—	—	—	
Timeless	Released: September 9, 2008; Labels: Verve; Formats: CD, digital download	54	6	—	—	—	
Anatomy of a Love Song	Released: April 14, 2015; Labels: SincereSoul, eOne Music; Formats: CD, digital download	177	14	10	—	—	
A Kenny Lattimore Christmas	Released: October 21, 2016; Label: SincereSoul, Motown Gospel; Formats: CD, digital download	—	23	—	4	—	
Vulnerable	Released: October 13, 2017; Label: SincereSoul; Formats: CD, digital download	—	—	21	—	—	
Here to Stay	Released: December 3, 2021; Label: SoNo; Formats: CD, digital download	—	—	—	—	—	

=== Collaborative albums ===
List of studio albums, with selected chart positions
Title	Album details	Peak chart positions		
Title	Album details	US	US R&B	US Gospel
Things That Lovers Do (with Chanté Moore)	Released: February 11, 2003; Labels: Arista; Formats: CD, digital download	31	3	—
Uncovered/Covered (with Chanté Moore)	Released: October 10, 2006; Labels: LaFace, Verity; Formats: CD, digital download	95	10	2

=== Compilation albums ===
List of studio albums, with selected chart positions
Title	Album details	Peak chart positions		
Title	Album details	US	US R&B	US Gospel
Days Like This: The Best of Kenny Lattimore	Released: May 18, 2004; Labels: Columbia, Legacy; Formats: CD, digital download	—	—	—
For You	Released: 2006; Labels: Sony BMG; Formats: CD, digital download	—	—	—

== Singles ==
=== As lead artist ===
Title	Year	Peak chart positions					Album
Title	Year	US	US R&B	US Adult R&B	US Dance	US Jazz	Album
"Never Too Busy"	1996	89	19	2	—	—	Kenny Lattimore
"Just What It Takes"	1996	—	55	29	—	—	Kenny Lattimore
"For You"	1997	33	6	1	—	—	Kenny Lattimore
"Days Like This"	1998	—	84	4	26	—	From the Soul of Man
"If I Lose My Woman"	1999	—	50	10	—	—	From the Soul of Man
"Heaven & Earth"	1999	—	—	—	—	—	From the Soul of Man
"Love Will Find a Way" (duet with Heather Headley)	1999	—	—	—	—	—	From the Soul of Man
"Weekend"	2001	—	51	12	—	—	Weekend
"Don't Deserve"	2001	—	—	25	—	—	Weekend
"Loveable (From Your Head to Your Toes)" (with Chanté Moore)	2003	—	—	19	—	—	Things That Lovers Do
"You Don't Have to Cry" (with Chanté Moore)	2003	—	—	30	—	—	Things That Lovers Do
"Tonight (2 Step)" (with Chanté Moore)	2005	—	—	39	—	—	Uncovered/Covered
"Figure It Out" (with Chanté Moore)	2006	—	—	37	—	—	Uncovered/Covered
"Make Me Like the Moon" (with Chanté Moore)	2006	—	—	—	—	—	Uncovered/Covered
"You Are My Starship"	2008	—	—	31	—	—	Timeless
"And I Love Her"	2009	—	—	—	—	7	Timeless
"Everybody Here Wants You"	2009	—	—	32	—	—	Timeless
"Find a Way"	2012	—	55	14	—	—	Anatomy of a Love Song
"Back 2 Cool" (featuring Kelly Price)	2012	—	—	—	—	—	Anatomy of a Love Song
"Heart Stops"	2013	—	—	—	—	—	Anatomy of a Love Song
"Love Me Back"	2015	—	—	8	—	—	Anatomy of a Love Song
"You're My Girl"	2015	—	—	—	—	—	Anatomy of a Love Song
"Real Love This Christmas"	2016	—	—	—	—	—	A Kenny Lattimore Christmas
"Push"	2017	—	—	28	—	—	Vulnerable
"Stay On Your Mind"	2017	—	—	7	—	—	Vulnerable
"I Cry Holy"	2017	—	—	—	—	—	A Kenny Lattimore Christmas
"Pressure"	2021	—	—	—	—	—	Here to Stay
"Lose You"	2022	—	—	—	—	—	Here to Stay
"Take a Dose"	2022	—	—	1	—	—	Here to Stay
"Silent Night" (with Syleena Johnson and Keke Wyatt)	2022	—	—	—	—	—	All I Want for Christmas
"Never Knew"	2023	—	—	4	—	—	Here to Stay
"Love On It" (with Nicholas Cole)	2025	—	—	29	—	—	Non-album singles
"Love at Christmas Time" (with Shanice)	2025	—	—	—	—	—	Non-album singles

=== As a featured artist ===
List of singles as lead artist, with selected chart positions and certifications, showing year released and album name
Title	Year	Peak chart positions	Album
Title	Year	US Adult R&B	Album
"Perfect Stranger" (Ledisi featuring Kenny Lattimore)	2024	13	Good Life

== Other appearances ==
List of album appearances
Title	Year	Other artist(s)	Album
"The Time of Year"	1996	—N/a	12 Soulful Nights of Christmas
"Can't Get Enough"	1997	—N/a	Love Jones
"Everything You Want"	1997	Ray J	Everything You Want
"The Promise"	1997	Ray J	Everything You Want
"Because of You"	1997	Ray J	Everything You Want
"River"	1997	Peter White	Songs of the Season
"Love Will Find a Way"	1998	Heather Headley	The Lion King II: Simba's Pride
"Just To Keep You Satisfied"	1999	—N/a	Marvin Is 60: A Tribute Album
"Beautiful Girl"	1999	—N/a	The Best Man
"Miracles"	1999	—N/a	Touched By An Angel: The Christmas Album
"Someone"	2001	Brian Culbertson	Nice & Slow
"Someone (Bonus Mix)"	2001	Brian Culbertson	Nice & Slow
"Nobody Knows You"	2002	Heather B.	Eternal Affairs
"thereason"	2003	Musiq	Soulstar
"One More…"	2010	Kim Waters	Love Stories
"Another Love"	2010	Brian Culbertson	XII
"Better"	2019	Najee	Center of the Heart
"Perfect Stranger"	2024	Ledisi	Good Life
