= Hurricane Chris discography =

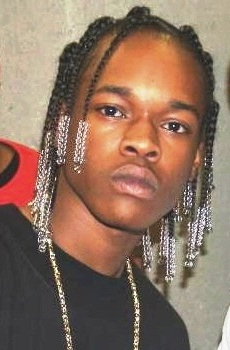
- Studio albums: 2
- Singles: 10
- Music videos: 6
- Independent albums: 1
- Mixtapes: 6

The discography of Hurricane Chris, an American rapper, consists of two studio albums, one independent album, nine mixtapes, six music videos, and ten singles (including two as a featured artist).

== Albums ==
=== Studio albums ===
List of albums, with selected chart positions
Title	Album details	Peak chart positions		
Title	Album details	US	US R&B	US Rap
51/50 Ratchet	Released: October 23, 2007; Label: Polo Grounds, J; Format: CD, LP, digital download	24	4	2
Unleashed	Released: December 21, 2009; Label: Polo Grounds, J; Format: CD, LP, digital download	—	46	20

=== Independent albums ===
List of albums, showing year released
Title	Album details
You Hear Me?	Released: October 2, 2007; Label: Rap-A-Lot; Format: CD, digital download

=== Mixtapes ===
List of mixtapes, showing year released
Title	Album details
Louisi-Animal	Released: August 16, 2007
Category 7: A Bad Azz Hurricane (with Lil Boosie)	Released: July 8, 2009
Louisianimal Pt 2	Released: May 1, 2010
Louisianimal 3	Released: September 3, 2010
Louisianimal 3.5	Released: September 4, 2010
Category 5	Released: December 28, 2010
Caniac	Released: January 2, 2013
Hurricane Season	Released: September 4, 2015
Verses	Released: 2016
King Cane	Released: March 7, 2017

== Singles ==
=== As lead artist ===
List of singles, with selected chart positions and certifications, showing year released and album name
Title	Year	Peak chart positions				Certifications	Album
Title	Year	US	US R&B	US Rap	NZ	Certifications	Album
"A Bay Bay"	2007	7	11	3	3	RIAA: Platinum	51/50 Ratchet
"The Hand Clap" (featuring Big Poppa of Ratchet City)	2007	72	45	18	—		51/50 Ratchet
"Playas Rock" (featuring Boxie)	2007	—	47	25	—		51/50 Ratchet
"Halle Berry (She's Fine)" (featuring Superstarr)	2009	52	7	7	—		Unleashed
"Headboard" (featuring Mario and Plies)	2009	—	63	—	—		Unleashed
"Bend It Over"	2012	—	—	—	—		Caniac
"Ratchet" (featuring Lil Boosie)	2014	—	—	—	—		Non-album single
"Sections" (featuring Ty Dolla Sign)	2015	—	—	—	—		Hurricane Season
"—" denotes a recording that did not chart or was not released in that territory.

=== As featured artist ===
List of singles, with selected chart positions, showing year released and album name
Title	Year	Peak chart positions		Album
Title	Year	US R&B	US Rap	Album
"Drop & Gimme 50" (Mike Jones featuring Hurricane Chris)	2007	44	18	The Voice
"Jigga Juice"^{[A]} (Lil Josh & Ernest featuring Diamond and Hurricane Chris)	2009	110	—	Young Money
"—" denotes a recording that did not chart or was not released in that territory.

== Guest appearances ==
List of guest appearances, with other performing artists, showing year released and album name
Title	Year	Other artist(s)	Album
"Dat Gurl Right Dere"	2007	Young Steff	—N/a
"Get Out My Bed"	2007	Taurus	Taurus
"Drop & Gimme 50"	2007	Mike Jones	The Voice
"Cyclone (Remix)"	2007	Baby Bash, T-Pain, Gorilla Zoe	—N/a
"Fly As Fuck (Remix)"	2008	Big Unk, Lil Boosie	Tolerated, But Hated
"Picture Perfect (Remix)"	2008	Chris Brown, Bow Wow	Exclusive: The Forever Edition
"We Ridin' (Batman)"	2008	V.I.C.	Beast
"Gutta Bitch (Remix)"	2008	Trai'D, DJ Khaled, Trina, Ace Hood, Bun B	Trai'dmark
"Jigga Juice"	2009	Lil Josh & Ernest, Diamond	Young Money
"Go Get the Money"	2009	Play-N-Skillz, Talib Kweli	Recession Proof
"Trouble (Remix)"	2009	Ginuwine, Gucci Mane, OJ da Juiceman	—N/a
"G-Shit"	2010	Trae tha Truth	—N/a
"Fuckin' Right"	2010	Killa Kyleon	Natural Born Killla
"Real Gangstas"	2010	Game, Bizzy Bone	The Red Room
"Ciroc"	2012	John Boy	GEEsH
"Astronaut"	2012	John Boy, Kayleb	GEEsH
"Go Crazy"	2013	Tex James, Yung Tone	Lookin for the Twerkers
"318 Freestyle"	2013	Lil Snupe	R.N.I.C.
"Da Realist"	2013	Lil Snupe	R.N.I.C. 2
"Bandz"	2013	Soulja Boy, Young CEO	—N/a

== Music videos ==
List of music videos, with directors, showing year released
Title	Year	Director(s)
"A Bay Bay"	2007	Bernard Gourley, Bobby Yan
"A Bay Bay (The Ratchet Remix)"	2007	UP
"The Hand Clap"	2007	—N/a
"Playas Rock"	2007	UP
"Halle Berry (She's Fine)"	2009	Christian Strickland
"Headboard"	2009	David Rousseau

== Notes ==
- A "Jigga Juice" did not enter the Hot R&B/Hip-Hop Songs chart, but peaked at number 10 on the Bubbling Under R&B/Hip-Hop Singles chart, which acts as a 25-song extension to the R&B/Hip-Hop Songs chart.
