= Here to Stay (Kenny Lattimore album) =

Studio album by Kenny Lattimore
- Released: December 3, 2021
- Length: 38:07
- Label: Sincere Soul; SoNo
- Producer: Bizness Boi; CAZ; DW; Stephen Ellis; Fwdslxsh; Terry Harris, Jr.; Hood Muzic; KND; Todd Jarrett Lee; Aaron Lindsey; Kennedy Lindsey; Lee Major; Natural; Daryl Simmons; Blake Strauss; Drak-Kar "Madicin" Wesley

Kenny Lattimore chronology
Vulnerable (2017)	Here to Stay (2021)

Singles from Here to Stay
- 1. "Pressure" Released: June 25, 2021; 2. "Lose You" Released: October 22, 2021; 3. "Take a Dose" Released: 2022; 4. "Never Knew" Released: 2023

Here to Stay is the tenth studio album by American singer Kenny Lattimore. His first album in four years, it was released through his own label, Sincere Soul Records, in partnership with the SoNo Recording Group on December 3, 2021. A mentoring effort to spotlight producer and frequent collaborator Drak-Kar "Madicin" Wesley, it was primarily assembled and led by him, while Lattimore brought longtime creative partners such Daryl Simmons, Darren "Champ" Jenkins and Lee Major on board.

Critics praised Here to Stay as a testament to Lattimore's enduring artistry, blending classic and modern R&B, though some noted the absence of a standout single and a few weaker tracks. While the album failed to chart, it produced two of Lattimore's highest-charting singles in more than two decades, with third single "Take a Dose" becoming his second number-one hit on the US Adult R&B Songs chart and follow-up and final single "Never Knew" also entering the chart's top ten.

== Background ==
After a longer break from the music industry, Lattimore released three studio albums — Anatomy of a Love Song (2015), A Kenny Lattimore Christmas (2016), and Vulnerable (2017) — through his own Sincere Soul Records between 2015 and 2017. While the albums achieved varying degrees of commercial success, they received predominantly positive reviews from critics. Singles such as "Love Me Back" (2015) and "Stay On Your Mind" (2017), both co-written or produced by frequent collaborator Drak-Kar "Madicin" Wesley, became top ten hits on the US Adult R&B Songs chart.

Although he had initially planned to record a "Frank Sinatra/Nat King Cole album," Lattimore's next project was largely driven by his previous collaborations with Wesley, whom he believed deserved greater recognition and a platform to showcase his talent. Describing Here to Stay as a "mentoring project," he considered a new album a "good vehicle to be a launchpad" for Wesley, who went on to share A&R and executive producer responsibilities with Lattimore and played a bigger central role in shaping the project. While Lattimore brought previous collaborators such as Daryl Simmons on board, it was Wesley who put much of the project together.

== Promotion ==
While the album’s initial singles saw little success, Lattimore achieved his greatest chart success in over 25 years with the final two releases. Here to Stay was first preceded by its lead single "Pressure." Produced by Bizness Boi, Fwdslxsh and Blake Straus, it was released on June 25, 2021 but failed to chart. "Lose You," produced by Wesley along wth Aaron Lindsey, Kennedy Lindsey and Juan "Natural" Najera served as the album's second single. Released on October 22, 2021, along with the announcement of Here to Stay's release date on December 3, 2021, it also failed to impact on the charts.

Third single "Take a Dose," produced by Wesley along with Lee Major and German producers Lucas "CAZ" Firmino and David A. "KND" Duodu, became Lattimore's highest-charting singles in years. It reached the top of the US Adult R&B Songs chart in the week of February 8, 2023, marking his first leader on the radio chart since the 17-week stint of his 1997 single "For You." It would remain two weeks atop the chart and also peaked at number 16 on the US R&B/Hip-Hop Airplay chart. Follow-up "Never Knew," produced by Daryl Simmons, entered the top ten of the Adult R&B Songs chart in its 18th week. It peaked at number four. "Never Knew" also reached number 26 on Billboard's R&B/Hip-Hop Airplay chart.

== Critical reception ==
Professional ratings
Review scores
Source	Rating
Albumism	4.5/5 stars
Reviews & Dunn	B

Antwane Folk from Rated R&B found that Here to Stay "engraves [Lattimore's] name in the books as a definitive force in adult contemporary R&B [...] This new album values his commitment to see that promise [of the album's title] to the very end." Mark Chappelle from Albumism wrote that the album "advances the singer's "artistry while preserving his proven creative pedigree." He found that Lattimore was "beating the odds handily to experience a creative renaissance. Here to Stay is peak artistry and promises to push him forward. Foot on the gas. No looking back. And definitely no skips."

SoulTracks's Justin Kantor noted that "the first half of Here to Stay incorporates shades of past hits from albums such as Kenny Lattimore and Weekend, while the second expands upon the stylistic diversions hinted at on 2017's Vulnerable." Kantor conclduded that with "maintaining his classic balance of mellifluousness and robust, he effectively secures his relevance in an overcrowded marketplace by keeping in mind both longtime fans and potential new listeners." Derrick Dunn from Reviews & Dunn called Here to Stay a "solid addition to an already impressive catalog." Although he felt that the album was missing a song of the caliber of "For You" and some songs were "on the filler side," he complimented most of the material along with Lattimore's vocal performance.

== Track listing ==
Here to Stay track listing
No.	Title	Writer(s)	Producer(s)	Length
1.	"Nothing On You"	Kenny Lattimore; Ivan Lattimore; Dra-Kkar "Madicin" Wesley; Terry Harris, Jr.; Timothy Stewart	Wesley; Harris	3:43
2.	"Never Knew"	Daryl Simmons; Mario Pugh	Simmons	4:30
3.	"Only Girl"	Darren "Champ" Jenkins; DeCarlos Waller	Jenkins	3:47
4.	"All In"	I. Lattimore; Wesley; Jonathan Glenn; Leight Elliot	Wesley; Lee Major; Todd Jarrett Lee	3:19
5.	"What Are You Waiting for?"	K. Lattimore; I. Lattimore; Wesley; Stephen "Keyz" Ellis	Wesley; Ellis	4:10
6.	"Lose You"	I. Lattimore; Wesley; Aaron W. Lindsey; Kennedy A. Lindsey; Johnny "Natural" Najera	Wesley; A. Lindsey; K. Lindsey; Najera	5:00
7.	"Take a Dose"	I. Lattimore; Wesley; David Agyepong Duodu; Lucas Firmino; Elliot	Wesley; CAZ; KND; Major	4:19
8.	"Pressure"	I. Lattimore; Wesley; Adeyinka Bankole; Andre Robertson; Blake Strauss; Darren Billy, Jr.; Joseph Leo Polk	Bizness Boi; Strauss; Fwdslxsh; Wesley^{[a]}	3:31
9.	"Priority"	I. Lattimore; Wesley; Paul Dwayne "DW" Wright, Jr.; Randall J. Hood	Wesley; Wright; Hood Muzic	3:47
10.	"Survive"	I. Lattimore; Wesley; A. Lindsey; Kevin Turner; Terry Harris, Jr.	Wesley; Harris	3:08
Total length:				38:07

Notes

- ^{^[a]} denotes a co-producer

== Personnel ==
- Darren "Lab Ox" Billy, Jr. – mixing
- Paul Boutin – mixing
- David A. "KND" Duodu – producer
- Stephen "Keyz" Ellis – producer
- Lucas "CAZ" Firmino – producer
- Fwdslxsh – producer
- Terry Harris, Jr. – producer
- Randall "Hood Muzic" Hood – producer
- Darren "Champ" Jenkins – engineering
- Kenny Lattimore – A&R, executive producer
- Todd Jarrett Lee – producer
- Aaron Lindsey – producer
- Kennedy A. Lindsey – engineering, producer
- Lee Major – producer
- Juan "Natural" Najera – mixing, producer
- Doramus Roberts – engineering
- Andre "Bizness Boi" Robertson – producer
- John Shyloski – mastering, mixing
- Daryl Simmons – producer
- Blake Strauss – producer
- Claude Villani – executive producer
- Lorenzo Wallace – photograhphy
- Drak-Kar "Madicin" Wesley – A&R, engineering, executive producer
- Dwayne "DW" Wright – producer

== Release history ==
Here to Stay release history
Region	Date	Format	Label	Ref(s)
Various	December 3, 2021	CD; download; streaming	Sincere Soul Records; SoNo Recording Group	
