= Michael Mauldin (record executive) =

American music executive (born 1953)

- Born: October 30, 1953 (age 72); Murphy, North Carolina, U.S.
- Occupations: Music executive; media proprietor; talent manager; event promoter; entrepreneur
- Years active: 1976–present
- Labels: Columbia; So So Def
- Title: Former President of Black Music/Senior VP at Columbia Records
- Children: 4, including Jermaine
- Website: screamtour.com mauldinbrand.com

Michael Thomas Mauldin (born October 30, 1953) is an American music executive, media proprietor, and talent manager. He is former President of Columbia Records' Black Music Division and former Senior Vice President of Columbia Records Group, and is the father of So So Def Recordings label founder Jermaine Dupri. He founded Mauldin Brand AC/VC in 2019, and launched the Black American Music Association in 2018, a 501(c)(6) trade association for which he also serves as chairman.

== Early life ==
Born and raised in Murphy, North Carolina, Mauldin later left Murphy for Atlanta, Georgia at the age of 20.

== Career ==
Beginning in 1976, Mauldin was a roadie for the disco, jazz, funk band "Brick". He later helmed a successful tour production & management business, with acts & clients including Cameo, The S.O.S. Band, Sister Sledge, The Reddings, Earth, Wind & Fire, Anita Baker, The original "New York City Fresh Fest", Luther Vandross. and more.

In 1993, Mauldin helped Jermaine Dupri (his then-20-year-old son) establish the label and was instrumental in helping Dupri and its artists achieve worldwide success. Mauldin served as executive producer for albums including JE Heartbreak II by Jagged Edge, Timeless, Uncovered/Covered, and Things That Lovers Do by Kenny Lattimore & Chante' Moore, Comin' from Where I'm From: Live & More by Anthony Hamilton, Beware of Dog (album), Doggy Bag, and Heartthrobs Live by Bow Wow, Jump/Lil Boys in Da Hood by Kris Kross, Off the Hook by Xscape, 12 Soulful Nights of Christmas, and Like Mike (soundtrack).

As President of Columbia Records, Mauldin directed the early careers of "Destiny's Child" (adding "Child" to be used in their stage name) and "Alicia Keys" (adding "Keys" to Alicia's stage name). Mauldin oversaw numerous multi-platinum releases from artists including Maxwell, Fugees, Lauryn Hill, Wyclef Jean, Nas, Men In Black soundtrack, Love Jones soundtrack and more.

In 2020, he served as an executive producer for Amplified; a digital entertainment show addressing the state of Black American Music; its foundation, preservation and innovation.

He is also the Managing Director for 2475 AtVille Entertainment, the owner of Air Control Music publishing, and the founder of Scream Nation, a concert tour launched in 2013 as a joint venture with Live Nation, which is known for its "Scream Tour."
