= Headboard =

Headboard may refer to:

- Headboard (furniture), a piece of furniture that attaches to the head of a bed
- "Headboard" (song), a 2009 song by rapper Hurricane Chris featuring Mario and Plies
- Headboard (train), a board attached to the front of trains, especially named trains
- Headboard (ship), a fitting on a sail often used to attach halyards with a headboard shackle
- A gravemarker made of wood, commonly used as a temporary marker, and in America before the commodification of stone gravemarkers
