= You Hear Me =

You Hear Me may refer to:

- You Hear Me, 2007 mixtape by Hurricane Chris
- "You Hear Me", song by Jay Chou from the 2003 album Yeh Hui-Mei
