= Art Phillips (composer) =

American composer

Art Phillips (born 1955, Erie, Pennsylvania) is a composer of film, television, and popular music. He has been working in film and television for over 50 years.

== Education and early career ==
Phillips's career began in the early 1970s in Los Angeles, where he was a session guitarist, composer, and orchestrator working and recording for popular artists including Barry Manilow, Minnie Riperton, Demis Roussos, The Carpenters, Smokey Robinson, Dory Previn, Burl Ives, and The Lettermen. He did work on television series and feature films before moving to Sydney, Australia in 1987. He was musical director, conductor, and orchestrator on live concert tours for Demis Roussos, Dory Previn, and John Rowles, and toured as guitarist for Barry Manilow for over three years. He produced recordings for Demis Roussos, Barry Manilow, Sally Kellerman, and John Rowles, achieving a Gold Record Award for his production work on the album Another Chapter for Rowles.

Phillips's earlier composition credits include background music for The Love Boat. He wrote the R&B single "Here We Go" for Minnie Riperton, and co-wrote the Motown Records release "Now That I Have You" for artist Teena Marie.

He holds a Master of Music Studies from Griffith University—Queensland Conservatorium of Music.

== Career ==
Phillips specialises in production music, and is the owner and director of 101 Music Pty Ltd®, a production music library catalogue consisting of over 80 library album releases with independent sub-publishing distribution deals across 90 foreign territories. 101 Music is an APRA AMCOS supplier and distributor of production music, and represents over 80 production music catalogues throughout Australasia with over 320,000 tracks.

Phillips is a screen composer, songwriter and guitarist. He toured internationally with Minnie Riperton, Barry Manilow, George Benson, John Rowles, and Demis Roussos as musical director/guitarist, and has co-written a top 10 Billboard R&B single.

A two-time Emmy Award recipient for Outstanding Music Composition in a Drama Series, with over 40 years of international experience including 2,000 hours of television scoring, Phillips's production music publishing catalogue and record label (101 Music) has been used on television shows throughout the world. He has a long list of credits with writing and producing original music for production music companies out of the US and UK He has released 51 CD albums in various styles. His music has been used in television shows, including America's Most Wanted, NYPD Blue, The Oprah Winfrey Show, Survivor, 60 Minutes, Queer Eye for the Straight Guy, Access Hollywood, Bonehead Detectives, American Idol, The Ricki Lake Show, Good Morning America, Amazing Medical Stories, Cold Case Files, The Dog Whisperer, A True Hollywood Story, Harry's Practice, The Great Outdoors, Extra—The Entertainment Magazine Show, and The USA Today Show.

His most recent scoring credits include the television series Missing Persons Unit (series 1–5), Catalyst, The Lost Treasure of Fiji (Pirate Islands), Dead Tired (two-part series), Made In China, The Secret Lives Of Sleepwalkers, Outback House, the telemovie Reprisal, Neighbours, The Flying Vet, Guiding Light, Secrets, The Fatal Bond, Signal One—Bullet Down Under, and Sher Mountain Mystery.

In 2004, U.S. recording artists Kenny Lattimore and Chanté Moore recorded his song "Here We Go" on their platinum album Things That Lovers Do.

Board positions include:

- Board director, AMPAL, the Australasian Music Publishers Association Limited, 2023–present
- Board director, IPMG, International Production Music Group, 2024–present
- Councillor (Film & TV), Music Council Australia, 2005–2019
- President, Australian Guild of Screen Composers, 2001–2008
- Academic Board member, Academy of Music and Performing Arts, 2023–present
- Course Advisory Committee, and Academic Board member, AGE, Australian Guild of Education - Bachelor of Music, 2025–

== Awards and honours ==
Phillips has won two Emmy Awards for Outstanding Music Direction and Composition in a Drama Series for the U.S. television drama Santa Barbara. In 1995, he was given the APRA Award by the Australian Guild of Screen Composers for Best Soundtrack Album for his score to the ABC television series The Flying Vet. In 2005 he was nominated for an ARIA Award for Best Original Soundtrack Album for Outback House, and was nominated in the APRA/AGSC Screen Music Awards for Best Music in a Television Series or Serial for Outback House. He received nominations for Best Original Music in a Children's Television Series for The Lost Treasure of Fiji in 2007 and 2008 at the APRA/AGSC Screen Music Awards. In 2006, Phillips's composition "Floating", from U.S. recording artist Megan Rochell, achieved Billboard's Top 40 R&B chart position.

Phillips served as vice president of the Australian Guild of Screen Composers from 1992 until 2000, and as president from 2001 to 2008. He is now a special projects consultant for the guild. He has written on numerous subjects and delivered lectures in Screen Music Composition for universities. He is a councillor for the Music Council of Australia, representing the film and television sector.

=== ARIA Music Awards ===
The ARIA Music Awards is an annual awards ceremony that recognises excellence, innovation, and achievement across all genres of Australian music. They commenced in 1987.

Year	Nominee / work	Award	Result	Ref.
2005	Outback House	Best Original Cast or Show Album	Nominated	
