= Lee Major =

American hip hop producer

- Also known as: LeeMajorKid
- Born: Petersburg, Virginia, U.S.
- Genres: Hip hop, R&B, pop
- Occupations: Record producer, songwriter
- Years active: 2008–present
- Member of: The Inkredibles
- Website: LeeMajorKid on Twitter; LeeMajorKid on Instagram

Leigh Elliott, known professionally as Lee Major, is an American hip hop producer also known by the moniker Lee Major Kid. Lee Major has received production credit on tracks for artists such as Jay-Z, Rick Ross, Jadakiss, Ace Hood, Young Jeezy, DJ Khaled, and others. In 2011, Lee Major established So Major Music.

== Biography ==
Lee Major was born in Petersburg, Virginia. He grew up in a family of musicians: his mother played piano, his father played drums, and his eldest brother played bass guitar. He began his production career as the co-owner and music-producing partner of the production company So Inkredible, LLC. During this period, he also began working professionally under the name The Inkredibles.

The production duo was discovered in 2007 on MySpace by SpiffTV, who introduced them to DJ Nasty. The Inkredibles were later managed by We The Best Management.

Among Major's early charting productions as part of The Inkredibles was Young Jeezy's "Vacation" from The Recession, which peaked at No. 16 on the Hot Rap Songs chart in 2008. By the end of 2009, Major had ended his affiliation with his original business partner. In 2011, he established the production company So Major Music.

== Musical style and production ==
Major has described his production style as melody-driven, noting that he often begins tracks from a melody idea, piano sound, drum groove, sound effect, loop or sound byte.

== Production discography ==
Incomplete list of songs produced by Lee Major
Year	Title	Primary artist(s)	Album	Song chart peaks			
Year	Title	Primary artist(s)	Album	R&B	Rap	MS R&B	US
2008	"Vacation"	Young Jeezy	The Recession (Rap #1)	56	16	30	—
2008	"Red Light" (feat. The Game)	DJ Khaled	We Global (Rap #3)	—	—	—	—
2008	"Final Warning" (feat. Ace Hood, Blood Raw, Lil Scrappy, Shawty Lo, Brisco, Bun B, etc.)	DJ Khaled	We Global (Rap #3)	—	—	—	—
2008	"Ride" (ft. Trey Songz)	Ace Hood	Gutta (Rap #2)	27	14		90
2008	"Money Ova Here"	Ace Hood	Gutta (Rap #2)	—	—	—	—
2008	"Get Him"	Ace Hood	Gutta (Rap #2)	—	—	—	—
2008	"Call Me"(ft. Lloyd)	Ace Hood	Gutta (Rap #2)	—	—	—	—
2008	"Ride Remix" (ft. Juelz Santana, Rick Ross, Trey Songz)	Ace Hood	Gutta (Rap #2)	—	—	—	—
2008	"Freakin" (ft. Gorilla Zoe & T-Pain)	T-Pain	PR33 Ringz				
2008	"Keep It Coming"	T-Pain	PrEVOLVEr				
2009	"Real As It Gets" (ft. Young Jeezy)	Jay-Z	The Blueprint 3 (Rap #1)	82			
2009	"Mafia Music"	Rick Ross	Deeper Than Rap (R&B/Rap #1)				
2009	"Usual Suspects" (ft. Nas and Kevin Cossom)	Rick Ross	Deeper Than Rap (R&B/Rap #1)				
2009	"Gunplay" (ft. Gunplay)	Rick Ross	Deeper Than Rap (R&B/Rap #1)				
2009	"Get Money" (ft. Rick Ross)	Ace Hood	Ruthless (Rap #2)				
2009	"Don't Get Caught Slippin"	Ace Hood	Ruthless (Rap #2)				
2009	"Make A Toast"	Ace Hood	Ruthless (Rap #2)				
2009	"Headboard" (ft. Mario and Plies)	Hurricane Chris	Unleashed (Rap #20)	63			
2009	"One" (ft. Akon)	Fat Joe	J.O.S.E. 2 (R&B #9)	74			
2009	"Talk to Me, Big Time'"	Capone-N-Noreaga	Channel 10 (Rap #7)				
2009	"Rewind" (ft. Wyclef Jean)	Flo Rida	R.O.O.T.S. (Rap #3)				
2009	"Grind Hard" (ft. Mary J. Blige)	Jadakiss	The Last Kiss (R&B #1)				
2010	"Free Mason" (ft. John Legend & Jay-Z)	Rick Ross	Teflon Don (R&B/Rap #2)				
2010	"Victory" (ft. Nas & John Legend)	DJ Khaled	Victory (Rap #2)				
2010	"Can You Help Me"	Dondria	Dondria vs. Phatfffat (R&B #9)				
2010	"Who's Gonna Love You"	Amerie	Cymatika Vol. 1.				
2010	"So Sad" (ft. Young Jeezy & Plies)	JW	Untitled				
2011	"Don't Let Me Go" (ft. Pill & Gunplay)	Rick Ross	Self Made Vol. 1 (Rap #1)				
2011	"Pandemonium" (ft. Wale, Meek Mill, & Rick Ross)	Rick Ross	Self Made Vol. 1 (Rap #1)				
2011	"Play Your Part" (ft. Rick Ross, Meek Mill, etc.)	Rick Ross	Self Made Vol. 1 (Rap #1)				
2011	"Evolve"	Mýa	K.I.S.S. (R&B #74)				
2011	"Still Wanna" (ft. Rick Ross & Liva Don)	Pusha T	Fear of God II: Let Us Pray (Rap #8)				
2011	"This Is Just What I Needed"	Howie D	Back to Me				
2012	"Power Circle" (ft. Gunplay, Stalley, Wale, Rick Ross, Meek Mill & Kendrick Lamar)	Rick Ross	Self Made Vol. 2 (Rap #1)				
2012	"Young Kings"	Meek Mill	Dreams & Nightmares (Rap #1)				
2012	"Keys To The Crib" (ft. Styles P)	Rick Ross	Rich Forever				
2013	"A Me Di Te"	Fabri Fibra	Guerra e pace				
2013	"Golden Salvation (Jesus Piece)"	Wale	The Gifted (R&B #1)				
2013	"Black Heroes / Outro About Nothing" (ft. Jerry Seinfeld)	Wale	The Gifted (R&B #1)				
2013	"New Girl"	Jacob Latimore	This Is Me 2				
2013	"My Life" (ft. French Montana)	Meek Mill	Dreamchasers 3				
2014	"D'usse"	Lil Wayne	TBA				
2015	"Makin' Love" (Produced with MasBeatz)	Tamar Braxton	Calling All Lovers (R&B #2)				
2015	"Intro Stroke Of Genius"	Wale	Wale x A-Trak: Festivus				
2015	"Still Gittin" (Produced with Sean Momberger)	Skeme	Ingleworld 2				
2015	"Rock Wit Me" (ft. Iamsu!)	Trevor Jackson	In My Feelings				
2015	"The Pull Up" (Produced with Trauma Tone Beats)	Rich Homie Quan	ABTA: Still Going In				
2016	"Still Up" (ft. Phil Ade & Jazz Cartier) (Produced with Ari Pen Smith)	Wale	Summer on Sunset				
2016	"Ride 4 U" (Produced with Trauma Tone Beats)	Shy Glizzy	Young Jefe 2				
2016	"Solbiato Freestyle"	Wale	Today....i Got Time!				
2017	"Replay" (Produced with Trauma Tone)	Rich Homie Quan	Back to the Basics				
2017	"DNA" (Produced with Sean Momberger)	Wale	Shine (R&B #8)				
2017	"So Woke" (Produced with Ray Baker)	No Malice	Let the Dead Bury the Dead				
2017	"Shame on Me" (Produced with Ray Baker)	No Malice	Let the Dead Bury the Dead				
2017	"Jesus Christ" (Produced with Ray Baker)	No Malice	Let the Dead Bury the Dead				
2017	"Push" (Produced with Jarret "Keyflo" Todd)	Kenny Lattimore	Vulnerable (Independent #21)				
2017	"Give It Up" (ft. 3 Glizzy) (Produced with Trauma Tone Beats & Keyflo)	Shy Glizzy	The World Is Yours				
2017	"Sho Nuff" (feat. MIKExAngel) (Produced with Sean Momberger & LVM of Nasty Beat Makers)	Trey Songz	Anticipation 3				
2017	"Anxious" (Bonus)	MIKExAngel	Anticipation 3				
2017	"My Oh My" (Produced with Sean Momberger)	MIKExAngel	Non-album single				
2017	"Anxious"	MIKExAngel	From Nothin 2 Somthin				
2017	"Wreckless"	MIKExAngel	From Nothin 2 Somthin				
2017	"Set It Off"	MIKExAngel	From Nothin 2 Somthin				
2017	"Never Had It" (Produced with Sean Momberger)	MIKExAngel	From Nothin 2 Somthin				
2017	"Give It To Me" (ft. Chris Brown)	Jeezy	Non-album single				
2017	"Comin 2 Eazy" (Produced with Trauma Tone)	Plies	Ain't No Mixtape Bih 3				
2018	"Body Body Body" (Produced with Sean Momberger)	Wale	Self Promotion				
2018	"Fiscal Thoughts" (ft. Wale & Phil Ade) (Produced with Sean Momberger)	Smoke DZA	Free Smoke				
2019	"Nowhere To Run" (ft. Bryson Tiller) (Produced with Sean Momberger, Vinylz, Boi1da & Jahaan Sweet)	Ryan Trey	A 64 East Saga				
2019	"False Signal" (Produced with Sean Momberger, G.ry & Nonstop DaHitman)	Melii	phAses				
2019	"Pay ya Bills" (ft. Jeremih) (Produced with Sean Momberger & Vinylz)	Pardison Fontaine	Under8ed				
2020	"Love On Me" (Produced with Sean Momberger / Co – Demario Bridges & Aaron Sledge)	K. Michelle	All Monsters Are Human (R&B #29)				
2020	"A lot More" (Produced with Sean Momberger, Boi1da & Sevn Thomas)	Russ	Shake the Snow Globe (R&B #4)				
2020	"Timeless Interlude" (Produced with Sean Momberger & Syk Sense)	Bryson Tiller	Anniversary (R&B #4)				
2020	"Always Be Gangsta Freestyle" (Produced with Trauma Tone)	Kevin Gates	Non-album single				
2021	"All She Wrote" (ft. Chandler Moore & Brandon Love) (Produced with Boi1da, Vinylz & Sean Momberger)	Justin Bieber	Freedom (Christian #3)				
2021	"Angels" (featuring Kaash Paige) (Produced with Nxghts, Neenyo and Sean Momberger)	Tinashe	333 (R&B #20)				
2021	"Faces" (Produced with Wheezy and Sean Momberger)	Young Thug	Punk (R&B #1)				
2021	"Kush Through the Sunroof" (Produced with Trauma Tone and Sean Momberger)	Currensy	Collection Agency				
2021	"Caramel" (Produced with iLLmaestro)	Wale	Folarin II (R&B #12; Rap #11)				
2021	"All In" (Produced with Keyflo)	Kenny Lattimore	Here to Stay				
2022	"Hide" (Produced with Sean Momberger & Mustard)	Ella Mai	Heart on My Sleeve (R&B #9; R&B #2)				
2022	"The Look" featuring Kehlani (Produced with Some Randoms & Sean Momberger)	Ali Gatie	WHO HURT YOU?				
2022	"Ballin" (Produced with Wheezy, Don Cannon & Sean Momberger)	A Boogie wit da Hoodie	Me vs. Myself (R&B #4)				
2023	"Touchin'" (Produced with iLLmaestro)	Honey Bxby	3 Words, 8 Letters				
2023	"My Biznazz" (Produced with Sean Momberger)	Baby Tate	Apple Music's Juneteenth 2023: Freedom Songs				
2023	"Jet Music" (Produced with Trauma Tone & Splited)	Curren$y	Highway 600 (with Trauma Tone)				
2023	"All Fucked Up" (Produced with Trauma Tone)	Curren$y	Highway 600 (with Trauma Tone)				
2023	"Sunday Drive Interlude" (Produced with Trauma Tone & Kino Beats)	Curren$y	Highway 600 (with Trauma Tone)				
2023	"Outro" (Produced with Trauma Tone, Kino Beats, Robert Dunnenberger & Operation Dream Team)	Curren$y	Highway 600 (with Trauma Tone)				
2024	"Sensei" (Produced with Sean Momberger & Don Cannon)	Tyga	TBA				
2024	"Peace Interlude" (Produced with Vinylz, Sean Momberger & BB)	Bryson Tiller	Bryson Tiller (R&B #4)				
2024	"Go Brazy" (Produced with Sean Momberger & Mustard)	YG	Just Re'd Up 3				
2024	"Fake Deep"	Elaine	Stone Cold Heart				
2024	"What You've Been Through" (Produced with Sean Momberger, Sam Sumser & Sean Small)	Breland	Project 2024				
2024	"TARIJI" (Produced with Sean Momberger, OG Parker & Javi Beats)	Yung Bleu	JERMY				
2025	"Dumb" featuring Big Sean and Flo Milli (Produced with Sean Momberger, DJ Swish & Adp)	Tyga	NSFW				
2025	"Bad for Me" (Produced with Sean Momberger & Nash)	Jacquees & DeJ Loaf	Fuck a Friendzone 2				
2025	"Trouble Don't Last" (Produced with Sean Momberger & Mustard)	Sam Hook	Sneaks (Original Motion Picture Soundtrack)				
2025	"Belly" (Produced with Sean Momberger & Keyflo Music)	Wale	Everything Is a Lot (R&B #5; Rap #3)				
2026	"First Day" (Produced with Mustard & Sean Momberger)	Ella Mai	Do You Still Love Me? (R&B #14)				
2026	"Theme Song" (Produced with Sean Momberger, Hitmaka & Keyflo)	Chris Brown	Brown				
2026	"Mine Too" (Produced with The Runners & Sean Momberger)	Rico Love	97 Bad Boy				
2026	"Yes" (featuring Sevyn Streeter) (Produced with iLLmaestro & Sean Momberger)	Vedo	V				
"—" denotes a recording that did not chart or was not released in that territory.

== Film and television ==
- Street Fighter: The Legend of Chun-Li
  - Track: Ace Hood – "Get Him"
- Stomp the Yard 2: Homecoming
  - Track: Ace Hood – "Don't Get Caught Slippin"
- America's Best Dance Crew
  - Track: Flo Rida – "Rewind" (featuring Wyclef Jean)
- ABC's NBA Finals
  - Track: DJ Khaled – "Victory" (featuring Nas & John Legend)
- ABC's NBA Playoffs
  - Track: Wale – "Golden Salvation (Jesus Piece)"
- Reasonable Doubt
  - Episode: "Can I Live?" (season 2, episode 1)
  - Track: Young Jeezy – "Vacation"
