= Timeless (Kenny Lattimore album) =

Studio album by Kenny Lattimore
- Released: September 9, 2008
- Length: 48:36
- Label: Verve
- Producer: Barry J. Eastmond

Kenny Lattimore chronology
Uncovered/Covered (2006)	Timeless (2008)	Anatomy of a Love Song (2015)

Singles from Timeless
- 1. "You Are My Starship" Released: September 2, 2008; 2. "And I Love Her" Released: 2008; 3. "Everybody Here Wants You" Released: 2008

Timeless is the sixth studio album by American singer Kenny Lattimore. It was released by Verve Records on September 9, 2008 in the United States. His first album solo album since 2001's Weekend, it followed, Things That Lovers Do (2003) and Uncovered/Covered (2006), Lattimore's duet albums with his then-wife Chanté Moore. His first solo cover album, Timeless was produced by his longtime collaborator Barry Eastmond and contains renditions of songs by artists such as Donny Hathaway and Aretha Franklin.

The album received mixed reviews, with critics praising its strong moments and production but noting a lack of originality and concern over Lattimore’s fading artistic identity. Timeless opened and peaked at number numer 53 on the US Billboard 200, becoming Lattimore's highest-charting solo album. It also reached number six on the Top R&B/Hip-Hop Albums chart. The album's singles saw modest success, with "And I Love Her" reaching number seven on the Smooth Jazz Airplay chart.

== Background ==
In October 2001, Lattimore released Weekend, his third studio album and debut with Arista Records. It opened and peaked at number 63 on the US Billboard 200 and number 24 on the Top R&B/Hip-Hop Albums chart, becoming his highest entry on the Billboard 200 yet. For his next two projects, he teamed up with his wife, singer Chanté Moore, to record the cover albums Things That Lovers Do (2003) and Uncovered/Covered (2006). While Things That Lovers Do was particularly successful, becoming the highest-charting album for both singers, Uncovered/Covered would mark the pair's final collaboration before their divorce. In 2008, Lattimore signed with Verve Records to release Timeless, his first solo project in seven years. Compromising eleven tracks and produced by longtime contributor Barry Eastmond, the cover album found the singer reinterpreting classic songs by artists ranging from The Beatles and Jeff Buckley to Aretha Franklin.

== Promotion ==
"You Are My Starship," a 1976 hit single by Norman Connors and Michael Henderson, was issued as the album's lead single. It reached number 31 on the US Adult R&B Songs chart. Follow-up "And I Love Her," a rendition of the 1964 Beatles original, became Lattimore's first top ten hit on the US Smooth Jazz Airplay chart, reaching number seven. Third and final single, a cover of Jeff Buckley's 1998 single "Everybody Here Wants You," peaked at number 32 on the US Adult R&B Songs chart.

== Critical reception ==
Professional ratings
Review scores
Source	Rating
About.com	3/5 stars
AllMusic	3/5 stars
Just Soul	4/5 stars

AllMusic editor Andy Kellman gave Timeless a three out of five stars rating. He found that the album "is another set lacking in fresh material must be a point of soreness for the singer's fans, but, taken on its own, the disc is hardly worth disregarding." Richard Ashie from Just Soul called the album a "beautiful collection of covers of older and newer artists [...] So overall does the album work? In a word "kinda." Where Lattimore is good, he truly shines [...] There is great instrumentation, gentle emotion in the voice, and the whole package fits together. On other tracks however Lattimore is just OK, and sometimes he is lacking." SoulTracks critic L. Michael Gipson felt that "as a collection Timeless holds up well enough, in some instances even better than most in the covers album cottage industry. The problem is that with each Lattimore cover album, we know Kenny less and less as a distinctive artist. The rapidly disappearing uniqueness of Kenny Lattimore is also starting to slip into his work as he strives to be more like the originals and less like himself."

== Commercial performance ==
Timeless opened and peaked at number 53 on the US Billboard 200, becoming Lattimore's highest-charting solo album. It also reached number six on the Top R&B/Hip-Hop Albums chart, making it his first solo project to reach the chart's top ten.

== Track listing ==
All tracks produced by Barry Eastmond.

No.	Title	Writer(s)	Original performer(s)	Length
1.	"Something"	Al Green; Willie Mitchell	Green	3:55
2.	"Everybody Here Wants You"	Jeff Buckley	Buckley	4:55
3.	"You Are My Starship"	Michael Henderson	Norman Connors featuring Henderson	4:13
4.	"And I Love Her"	John Lennon; Paul McCartney	The Beatles	2:57
5.	"Come Down in Time"	Bernie Taupin; Elton John	John	3:21
6.	"Ain't No Way"	Carolyn Franklin	Aretha Franklin	5:05
7.	"That's The Way Love Is"	Barrett Strong; Norman Whitfield	Marvin Gaye	4:11
8.	"It Ain't No Use"	Stevie Wonder	Wonder	5:00
9.	"I Love You More Than Words Can Say"	Otis Redding	Redding	3:51
10.	"Undeniably"	Terence Trent D'Arby	D'Arby	4:56
11.	"Giving Up"	Van McCoy	Donny Hathaway	6:12
Total length:				48:36

== Personnel ==
- John Anderson – synthesizer
- Ray Bardani – mixing
- Jerry Barnes – bass guitar
- Sherrod Barnes – guitar, wah-wah guitar
- Eddie Cole – background vocals
- Wilburn "Squidley" Cole – drums
- Amanda Dandy – background vocals
- Tabetha Dandy – background vocals
- Barry Eastmond – Fender Rhodes piano, keyboards
- George Fontenette – trumpet, programming, drum programming
- Mark Gross – alto saxophone
- Omar Hakim – drums
- Everette Harp – tenor saxophone
- Bashiri Johnson – percussion
- Kenny Lattimore – vocals
- Keith Loftis – tenor saxophone
- Jason Marshall – baritone saxophone
- Chedrick Mitchell – organ
- Dustin Moore – bass guitar
- Rafael Padilla – percussion
- Tamika Peoples – background vocals
- Ralph Rolle – drums
- Saunders Sermons – trombone
- Ira Siegel – guitar, sitar
- John Smith – acoustic guitar
- Michael White – drums
- Gordon Williams – mixing, percussion, programming

== Charts ==
Chart performance for Timeless
Chart (2008)	Peak position
US Billboard 200	54
US Top R&B/Hip-Hop Albums (Billboard)	6
