= From the Soul of Man =

Studio album by Kenny Lattimore
- Released: September 8, 1998
- Length: 73:45
- Label: Columbia
- Producer: Walter Afanasieff; Dre & Vidal; Barry J. Eastmond; David Foster; Carvin Haggins; Kipper Jones; Kenny Lattimore; Kenny Lerum; James Poyser; Guy Roche; Daryl Simmons; Jeff Townes

Kenny Lattimore chronology
Kenny Lattimore (1996)	From the Soul of Man (1998)	Weekend (2001)

Singles from From the Soul of Man
- 1. "Days Like This" Released: July 20, 1998; 2. "If I Lose My Woman" Released: 1999; 3. "Love Will Find a Way" Released: 1999; 4. "Just Can't Get Over You" Released: 1999

From the Soul of Man is the second studio album by American singer Kenny Lattimore. It was released by Columbia Records on September 8, 1998 in the United States. Building on the success of his 1996 debut, Lattimore approached the project as a personal and artistic continuation, even while collaborating with new producers such as Daryl Simmons, Barry J. Eastmond, Carvin Haggins, and Dre & Vidal. He co-wrote most of the songs From the Soul of Man, which he would later describe as his "lyric album."

The album was widely praised as a mature follow-up to Lattimore's debut, with critics highlighting his vocals, style, and the album's blend of ballads and vibrant grooves. From the Soul of Man peaked at number 71 on the US Billboard 200 and number 15 on the Top R&B/Hip-Hop Albums chart, selling 83,000 copies domestically. While none of its singles impacted on the Billboard Hot 100, its first two singles "Days Like This" and "If I Lose My Woman" became top ten hits on the Adult R&B Songs chart.

== Background ==
In 1996, Lattimore released his self-titled debut album with Columbia Records. The album reached a peak of number 19 on the US Billboard Top R&B/Hip-Hop Albums chart and sold more than 527,000 copies domestically. Third single For You" emerged as the album's biggest hit with sales in excess of 391,000 units. For his next project with the label, Lattimore consulted musicians Daryl Simmons, Barry J. Eastmond, and Dre & Vidal to work with him on new material. Although he was working with some of them for the first time, he considered the album a continuation of its predecessor. Lyrically, Lattimore described From the Soul of Man as a deeply personal project, rooted in his understanding of what true love really means, telling Billboard: "I wanted to talk about the depth of relationships and say things that men don't normally say about love or forget to say [...] I decided to dig a little deeper, to talk more about my personal experiences as well as experiences of other men I knew personally. From The Soul of Man is like lifting the lid off of some of our [black men's] secrets without revealing too much."

== Promotion ==
From the Soul of Man's lead single "Days Like This," co-written and produced by Lattimore with Vidal Davis, was released to US radios on July 20, 1998 and peaked at number 84 on the US Hot R&B/Hip-Hop Songs and number four on Billboard's Adult R&B Songs chart. Re-released with soulful Nuyorican soul house mixes, produced by Masters at Work, the track climbed to number 26 on the US Hot Dance Music/Club Play chart. Second single "If I Lose My Woman" fared better on the Hot R&B/Hip-Hop Songs chart, peaking at number 15. It also topped the Billboard Bubbling Under R&B/Hip-Hop Singles in early 1999 within the three weeks of its appearance on the chart.

== Critical reception ==
Professional ratings
Review scores
Source	Rating
AllMusic	3/5 stars

Critics uniformly lauded this album as a great leap from Lattimore' debut on the scene two years prior to this largely mature effort. AllMusic editor Michael Gallucci rated the album three out of five stars and wrote: "Despite its lumbering length and some slick, late-'90s R&B formalities, Lattimore's second album is a real treat. Combining smooth grooves with an even silkier voice, [he] shifts from bedroom operator to new jack king with an ease that seems neither forced nor affected on From the Soul of Man." He concluded: "When Lattimore gently soaks in the material, From the Soul of Man is truly a spirited affair." Vibe magazine's Abby Reed called the project a "rousing sophomore album" and noted that "the best songs on From the Soul of Man are the ones — "Days Like This," "Just Can't Get Over You" — that bounce. And the grown-up, passionate lyrics on gorgeous ballads like "Trial Separation" are inspiring." Reed concluded: "From the Soul of Man is heightened by the strength of Lattimore's impressive voice, which effortlessly transforms from a deep, smoky alto into a bright falsetto — always sounding pure and sublime." Billboard editor Paul Verna felt that From the Soul of Man had a "song for just about every listener. Lattimore pulls out all the creative stops to help showcase his full vocal capacity. Much as he did on his self-titled debut, Lattimore continues to target many of his songs toward both men and women. A great majority of the tracks [...] lay out the intricacies of real '90s relationships from the black male point of view."

== Commercial performance ==
In the United States, the album peaked at number 71 on the Billboard 200. On Billboard's Top R&B/Hip-Hop Albums chart, it reached number 15. By the end of the year, From the Soul of Man had sold 83,000 units domestically. Sales of the album took off again in 2020 after The Last Dance showed American former professional basketball player Michael Jordan discussing with reporters an advance copy of what Lattimore later confirmed was From the Soul of Man.

== Track listing ==
US edition

No.	Title	Writer(s)	Producer(s)	Length
1.	"Days Like This"	Lattimore; Vidal Davis; Tim Motzer	Lattimore; Davis	5:17
2.	"Trial Separation"	Lattimore; Davis; Kipper Jones	Lattimore; Davis; Jones	4:45
3.	"If I Lose My Woman"	Lattimore; Daryl Simmons	Simmons	5:25
4.	"Make Believe"	Lattimore; Barry J. Eastmond	Eastmond	4:46
5.	"Just Can't Get Over You"	Lattimore; Davis; Jones; James Poyser	Lattimore; Davis; Jones; Poyser	5:22
6.	"I Love You More Than You'll Ever Know"	Al Kooper	Lattimore; Jeff Townes	6:30
7.	"Destiny"	Lattimore; Davis; Carvin Haggins	Lattimore; Davis; Haggins	4:32
8.	"Tomorrow"	Lattimore; Andre Harris	Lattimore; Harris	5:21
9.	"While My Guitar Gently Weeps"	George Harrison	Lattimore; Davis	5:29
10.	"Heaven & Earth"	Kenny Lerum; Herb Middleton	Lattimore; Davis; Lerum	5:48
11.	"All My Tomorrows"	Diane Warren	Lattimore; Guy Roche	4:46
12.	"Interlude: Introspective Mood"	Harris		0:20
13.	"Well Done"	Lattimore; Pat McClain	Lattimore; Davis; Townes	5:35
14.	"Love Will Find a Way" (featuring Heather Headley)	Jack Feldman; Tom Snow	Lattimore; Lerum	4:30
15.	"If You Could See You (Through My Eyes)" (Hidden bonus track)	Warren	Lattimore; Davis	4:59

European bonus tracks

No.	Title	Writer(s)	Producer(s)	Length
15.	"For You"	Lerum	Eastmond	4:00
16.	"If You Could See You (Through My Eyes)"	Warren	Lattimore; Davis	4:57

== Personnel ==
Credits adapted from the liner notes of From the Soul of Man.

Performers and musicians

- Sue Ann Carwell – backing vocalist
- Vidal Davis – instruments
- Azel Dixon – hammond
- Bruce Dukov – concertmaster
- Earle D. Dumler – oboe
- Ronnie Grant – bass
- Philip Hamilton – bass guitar
- Andre Harris – drums
- Sonny Lallerstedt
- Kenny Lattimore – vocalist
- Kenny Lerum – instruments
- Pat McClain – bass, piano
- Frank McComb – organ, rhodes
- LaFerron Miles, Jr. – backing vocalist
- Tia Mintz – backing vocalist
- Tim Motzer – guitar
- Dean Parks – guitar
- Pink – backing vocalist
- James Poyser, bass, rhodes
- Guy Roche – keyboards
- Richard J. Todd – horn
- James Townes – bass

Technical

- Walter Afanasieff – producer
- Dre & Vidal – mixing engineer, producer
- Barry J. Eastmond – producer
- David Foster – producer
- Jon Gass – mixing engineer
- Mick Guzauski – mixing engineer
- Carvin Haggins – producer
- Steve Hall – mastering engineer
- Booker T. Jones – mixing engineer
- Kipper Jones – producer
- Kenny Lattimore – producer
- Kenny Lerum – producer
- Tony Maserati – mixing engineer
- James Poyser – producer
- Brian Reeves – mixing engineer
- Guy Roche – producer
- Daryl Simmons – producer
- Jeff Townes – producer

== Charts ==
Chart performance for From the Soul of Man
Chart (1998)	Peak position
US Billboard 200	71
US Top R&B/Hip-Hop Albums (Billboard)	15
