= The Hand Clap =

2007 single by Hurricane Chris

Single by Hurricane Chris featuring Big Poppa of Ratchet City

from the album 51/50 Ratchet
- A-side: "Playas Rock"
- B-side: "A Bay Bay"
- Released: August 8, 2007
- Genre: Hip hop
- Length: 4:21
- Label: Polo Grounds; J
- Songwriters: Christopher Dooley, Jr.
- Producer: Phunk Dawg

Hurricane Chris singles chronology
"A Bay Bay" (2007)	"The Hand Clap" (2007)	"Drop & Gimme 50" (2007)

"The Hand Clap" is the second single by American rapper Hurricane Chris from his debut studio album, 51/50 Ratchet (2007). The song features guest vocals from Big Poppa of Ratchet City, and it is produced by Phunk Dawg.

== Music video ==
The music video was premiered on BET's 106 & Park on September 18, 2007.

== Charts ==
Chart (2007)	Peak position
US Billboard Hot 100	78
US Hot Rap Tracks (Billboard)	18
US Hot R&B/Hip-Hop Songs (Billboard)	45
US Pop 100 (Billboard)	40
