= Vulnerable (Kenny Lattimore album) =

Studio album by Kenny Lattimore
- Released: October 13, 2017
- Length: 44:54
- Label: Sincere Soul; Liger
- Producer: Walter Jamie Hawkins; Phillip "P. Marley" Hill, Jr.; Aaron W. Lindsey; Lee Major; John Wesley McVicker, Jr.; DeMonté Posey

Kenny Lattimore chronology
A Kenny Lattimore Christmas (2016)	Vulnerable (2017)	Here to Stay (2021)

Vulnerable is the ninth studio album by American singer Kenny Lattimore. It was released by Sincere Soul Records and Liger Enterprises on October 13, 2017. The album peaked at number 21 on the US Independent Albums chart.

== Background ==
Vulnerable marked Lattimore's third project on his own Sincere Soul label, following Anatomy of a Love Song (2015) and A Kenny Lattimore Christmas (2016). The singer worked with producer Drakkar Wesley on most of the album which he described as "a mentoring effort" in regards to Wesley influencing the entire project after having previously worked with Lattimore on his previous albums. Citing a "1980s feel" on the album due to its soft rock elements, Lattimore elaborated on their collaboration: "I'm grateful to him for all of the ideas that came. I’ve written on each song really from directing and shaping, but the majority of the real creativity and the meat of this album came from me giving a young producer a chance."

Apart from Wesley, Lattimore worked with Walter Jamie Hawkins, Phillip "P. Marley" Hill, Aaron W. Lindsey, Lee Major, and DeMonté Posey on the album. Vulnerable was named after its same-titled opening record, which Lattimore felt was encompassing "a theme of all the songs." He further remarked: "The lyrics lend itself to me as a man stripping my emotions down and saying, Hey! I’m ready to be in love again and whatever that takes I have the strength to allow myself to be vulnerable."

== Critical reception ==
Justin Kantor from SoulTracks found that Vulnerable "flows fluidly with ten thoughtfully crafted songs that complement the singer’s graceful tenor tenacity with smart production values. His phrasing and nuances shines through, but the arrangements stand equally firm in their musicality. The set’s lead single, “Push” is, in fact, the only selection that bends considerably to current trends—and it does so in a way that doesn’t compromise melodic or lyrical quality." SoulAndFunkMusic.com described album as "a carefully curated collection of 10 songs that embody Lattimore's unique ability to create music that is infinitely relatable and consistently captures what it means to be in love."

== Commercial performance ==
Vulnerable debuted and peaked at number 21 on the US Billboard Independent Albums. It marked Lattimore's first album to neither reach the Billboard 200 nor the Top R&B/Hip-Hop Albums chart.

== Track listing ==
Vulnerable track listing
No.	Title	Writer(s)	Producer(s)	Length
1.	"Vulnerable"	Drakkar Wesley; Ivan Latimore; John Wesley McVicker, Jr.; Kenny Lattimore	McVicker; Wesley^{[a]}	4:05
2.	"Push"	Wesley; I. Latimore; Johnny Mollings; K. Lattimore; Leigh Elliott; Lenny Mollings; Todd Jarrett Lee	Lee Major; Keyflo^{[a]}	3:27
3.	"Stay On My Mind"	Aaron W. Lindsey; Wesley; I. Latimore; K. Lattimore; Steve Valdez	Lindsey	3:37
4.	"Perfection"	Wesley; I. Latimore; McVicker; K. Lattimore	McVicker; Wesley^{[a]}	4:03
5.	"Curtains Closed"	Wesley; I. Latimore; McVicker; K. Lattimore	McVicker; Wesley^{[a]}	4:20
6.	"Priceless"	Wesley; I. Latimore; Phillip "P. Marley" Hill, Jr.; K. Lattimore	Hill; Wesley^{[a]}	3:40
7.	"Deserve"	Wesley; I. Latimore; McVicker; K. Lattimore	McVicker; Wesley^{[a]}	4:19
8.	"Falling for You"	DeMonté Posey; Kameron Parker; Kenneth Edmonds; K. Lattimore; Kevin Kessee	Posey	3:24
9.	"One More Night"	K. Lattimore; Phil Collins	Lindsey	4:33
10.	"More Than Life"	Walter Jamie Hawkins; K. Lattimore	Hawkins	4:28

Bonus track
No.	Title	Writer(s)	Length
11.	"Never Too Busy" (Live)	Dave "Jam" Hall; Kipper Jones	5:04
Total length:			44:54

Notes

- ^{^[a]} denotes a co-producer

== Charts ==
Weekly chart performance for Vulnerable
Chart (2017)	Peak position
US Independent Albums (Billboard)	21

== Release history ==
Vulnerable release history
Region	Date	Format	Label	Ref(s)
Various	October 13, 2017	CD; download; streaming	Sincere Soul Records; Liger Enterprises	
