= Anatomy of a Love Song =

Studio album by Kenny Lattimore
- Released: April 14, 2015
- Length: 53:26
- Labels: Sincere Soul; eOne
- Producers: Carvin & Ivan; Vidal Davis; J.R. Hutson; Jamal McCoy; Courtney Peebles; Dra-kkar Wesley

Kenny Lattimore chronology
| Timeless (2008) | Anatomy of a Love Song (2015) | A Kenny Lattimore Christmas (2016) |

Singles from Anatomy of a Love Song
- 1. "Find a Way"; 2. "Back 2 Cool"; 3. "Heart Stops"; 4. "Love Me Back"; 5. "You're My Girl"

Anatomy of a Love Song is the seventh studio album by American singer Kenny Lattimore. It was released by his own label Sincere Soul in partnership with eOne Music on April 14, 2015. Produced following a hiatus and a period of artistic identity crisis, the album was initially titled Back 2 Cool but was subsequently reworked and released under its final title after changes in label affiliation and distribution. Main production on the album was overseen by Carvin & Ivan, Vidal Davis, and J.R. Hutson.

Critics praised Anatomy of a Love Song for Lattimore's vocals, its stripped-down ballads, and strong return to original music after 14 years. On the charts, it opened and peaked at number 14 on the US Top R&B/Hip-Hop Albums and number 10 on the US Independent Albums chart, becoming one of his lower charting sets. Preceded by a number of singles, the album's most successful single was "Love Me Back" which marked his fourth top ten his on the US Adult R&B Songs chart.

== Background ==
In 2003 and 2006, Lattimore collaborated with his then-wife, singer Chanté Moore, to record the cover albums Things That Lovers Do (2003) and Uncovered/Covered (2006). While Things That Lovers Do was particularly successful, becoming the highest-charting album for both singers, the couple had reservations about recording follow-up Uncovered/Covered, a more Gospel-flavored album. Less successful on the charts, it led to a crisis of artistic identity for Lattimore. Music executive Michael Mauldin eventually convinced him to record the solo album Timeless, another cover album. Released by Verve Records in 2008, it became Lattimore's highest-charting solo project yet and helped him to "find [his] voice again," though he was still unsure if he would ever record original music again.

Following the conclusion of all promotion for Timeless, Lattimore decided to take time off to spend it with his son and reevaluate his next career moves. Producer Carvin Haggins eventually persuaded him to return to music some time later. In Philadelphia, the two began working on a number of songs, which would eventually form the foundation of Lattimore's next studio album, Back 2 Cool. To release the album, he founded his own label, Sincere Soul, and entered into a partnership with EMI Records — a collaboration that, however, did not unfold as he had envisioned. eOne Music stepped in, negotiated the album out of the deal with EMI and took over distribution. With eOne on board, Lattimore decided to rework the album and give it a new title, Anatomy of a Love Song.

== Critical reception ==
Professional ratings
Review scores
| Source | Rating |
|---|---|
| AllMusic | 4/5 stars |
| Rated R&B | 4/5 stars |

In his review for AllMusic, editor Andy Kellman found that "the singer is at his best when he cooks up modern smooth soul that evokes late-night, late-'70s/early-'80s R&B radio programming; a cover of a ballad written by the likes of Skip Scarborough or Leon Ware could have been inconspicuously slipped into the sequence [...] It sounds as if Lattimore felt absolutely no pressure in delivering his first widely released solo album of original material in 14 years." Ivory Jeff Clinton from Rated R&B wrote that "on his impressive new release, the silky tenor that has always given his songs distinction is as stellar as ever. As the title suggests, Anatomy of a Love Song takes a back-to-basics approach to balladry. And less proves to be more as the vast majority of the 14 tracks successfully eschew overproduction." Soul in Stereo noted that "Lattimore's vocals soar like no other, as this album proves. Lattimore slowly leaked singles for what seemed like years before finally delivering his fifth solo album last spring. It was certainly worth the wait."

== Commercial performance ==
Anatomy of a Love Song debuted and peaked at number 177 on the US Billboard 200. While it marked his lowest-charting project yet, it also reached number 14 on the Top R&B/Hip-Hop Albums, and number three on the Top R&B Albums, and number 10 on the Independent Albums chart.

== Track listing ==
Anatomy of a Love Song track listing
| No. | Title | Writer(s) | Producer(s) | Length |
|---|---|---|---|---|
| 1. | "Love Me Back" | Dra-kkar Wesley; Ivan Latimore; Kenny Lattimore; Hinton Raymond Shondale; Trevis Harris | Wesley; Hinton Raymond Shondale^{[a]} | 3:39 |
| 2. | "Remix This Heart" | Harry Wilson; Mary Brown; Natasha Terrel; Robert Thomas; Vidal Davis | Davis | 3:03 |
| 3. | "Heart Stops" | Wesley; I. Latimore; K. Lattimore; Nicholas "Fouryn" Baker; T. Harris | Wesley; Baker^{[a]} | 4:07 |
| 4. | "Still Good" (featuring Da' T.R.U.T.H. & Shanice) | Emmanuel Lambert, Jr.; Eric Rousseau; Jamal McCoy; K. Lattimore | McCoy; Lee "J.R." Hutson^{[a]} | 4:03 |
| 5. | "Find a Way" | Brandon Hines; Carvin Haggins; Ivan Barias; Leonard Stevens; Raheem DeVaughn | Carvin & Ivan | 3:30 |
| 6. | "You Have My Heart" | Haggins; Damon Parker; Barias; Johnny Smith | Carvin & Ivan | 3:25 |
| 7. | "Nothing Like You" (featuring Lalah Hathaway) | Devron Patterson; K. Lattimore; Hathaway; Davis | Davis | 4:29 |
| 8. | "You're My Girl" | Jairus Mozee; K. Lattimore; Davis | Davis | 3:29 |
| 9. | "Look of Love" | Andre Harris; Jamar Jones; Rico Love; Thomas; Davis | Davis | 3:37 |
| 10. | "What Must I Do" | Antoine Harris; Hines; Haggins; Curt Chambers; Barias | Carvin & Ivan | 3:26 |
| 11. | "Blood, Sweat & Tears" | Lance Tolbert; Lauren Evans | Hutson; Tolbert^{[a]} | 3:37 |
| 12. | "Back 2 Cool" (featuring Kelly Price) | Jennah Hughes Taylor; Wreh Jalla | Hutson; Jalla^{[a]} | 4:01 |
| 13. | "Built to Last" | Lee Hutson, Jr.; Rich King; Tiwa Savage | Hutson | 4:36 |
| 14. | "Beautiful Nowheres" | Courtney "J.R." Peebles; K. Lattimore | Peebles; Hutson^{[a]} | 4:31 |
| Total length: | | | | 53:26 |

Notes

- ^{^[a]} denotes a co-producer

== Charts ==
Chart performance for Anatomy of a Love Song
| Chart (2015) | Peak position |
|---|---|
| US Billboard 200 | 177 |
| US Independent Albums (Billboard) | 10 |
| US Top R&B/Hip-Hop Albums (Billboard) | 14 |
