= A Kenny Lattimore Christmas =

Studio album by Kenny Lattimore
- Released: October 21, 2016
- Length: 47:50
- Labels: Sincere Soul; Motown Gospel
- Producers: Nate "Impact" Jolley; Aaron W. Lindsey; Juan "Natural" Najera; Dra-kkar Wesley

Kenny Lattimore chronology
Anatomy of a Love Song (2015)	A Kenny Lattimore Christmas (2016)	Vulnerable (2017)

A Kenny Lattimore Christmas is the eighth studio album by American singer Kenny Lattimore. It was released by Sincere Soul Records and Motown Gospel on October 21, 2016. His first Christmas album, A Kenny Lattimore Christmas reached number 37 on the US Top R&B/Hip-Hop Albums chart.

== Critical reception ==
Professional ratings
Review scores
Source	Rating
CCM Magazine	5/5 stars
Reviews & Dunn	B+

In his review for CCM Magazine, editor Andy Argyrakis found that "the veteran's silky voice comes across as smooth as ever, while the messages contained therein range from anticipating Christ’s coming into the world, spending quality time with family and spreading Yuletide cheer with the world at large. Add in a stylistic swath as wide as modern R&B, jazz, gospel or straight up pop, and A Kenny Lattimore Christmas is a sumptuous melting pot of the season’s sweetest sounds wrapped around its most touching messages." Although he took issue with the song selection here and there, Derrick Dunn from Reviews & Dunn called the album a "good holiday project overall." SoulTracks's Justin Kantor noted: "From the cheery, rhythmic start of the album to this unaffected, peaceful final selection, A Kenny Lattimore Christmas is characterized by the qualities we all strive for during this special time of year: joy, excitement, and peace. The musicality with which he relates each emotion is what makes the album not just another holiday collection, but a choice seasonal set that will provide enjoyment and warmth for years to come."

== Commercial performance ==
A Kenny Lattimore Christmas became Lattimore's first project to miss the US Billboard 200. It however reached number 37 on the Top R&B/Hip-Hop Albums chart and became his second album to reach the top five of the Top Gospel Albums, following the number two peak of Uncovered/Covered, his 2006 duets album with his then-wife, singer Chanté Moore.

== Track listing ==
A Kenny Lattimore Christmas track listing
No.	Title	Writer(s)	Length
1.	"Real Love This Christmas"	Kenny Lattimore; Malik Yusef; Nate "Impact" Jolley	3:37
2.	"Everybody Love Somebody"	Lindsey; Juan "Natural" Najera, Jr.; K. Lattimore	3:38
3.	"Home for the Holidays"	Dra-Kkar Wesley; Ivan Latimore; K. Lattimore	1:53
4.	"I'll Be Home for Christmas"	Buck Ram; Walter Kent; Kim Gannon	3:51
5.	"God Rest Ye Merry Gentlemen"	Traditional	4:31
6.	"Have Yourself a Merry Little Christmas"	Hugh Martin; Ralph Blane	3:06
7.	"O' Holy Night"	Adolphe Adam; John Sullivan Dwight	5:53
8.	"I Cry Holy"	Lindsey; J. Scott; K. Lattimore	4:46
9.	"Reason to Celebrate"	Lindsey; K. Lattimore	7:32
10.	"We Want to See You"	Lindsey; K. Lattimore	5:40
11.	"The Christmas Song"	Mel Tormé; Robert Wells	3:13
Total length:			47:50

== Charts ==
Chart performance for A Kenny Lattimore Christmas
Chart (2016)	Peak position
US Top Gospel Albums (Billboard)	4
US Top R&B/Hip-Hop Albums (Billboard)	37
