= A Bay Bay =

Single by Hurricane Chris

from the album 51/50 Ratchet
- Released: April 10, 2007
- Recorded: 2006
- Genre: Crunk
- Length: 5:06 (album version); 4:18 (radio edit)
- Label: J; Polo Grounds Music; Go Live; Sony BMG
- Songwriter: Chris Dooley Jr.
- Producer: Phunk Dawg

Hurricane Chris singles chronology
"A Bay Bay" (2007)	"The Hand Clap" (2007)

"A Bay Bay" is the debut single by American rapper Hurricane Chris, released on April 10, 2007. The song was produced by Phunk Dawg. It peaked at number 7 on the US Billboard Hot 100.

== Commercial performance ==
The song debuted at number 95 on the US Billboard Hot 100. In its second week, the song rose to number 85; in its third week, it rose 61 places to number 24. The song later peaked at number 7 on the chart. It peaked at number 3 on the New Zealand singles chart.

== Music video ==
The video was shot and filmed in Cedar Grove, showing local landmarks and featuring a crowd of people singing along to the song. The music video peaked at number one on BET's 106 & Park. Closing out the year, the music video peaked at number 3 on BET's Top 100 Videos of 2007.

== Remixes ==
The remix, titled "The Ratchet Remix", features guest vocals by fellow rappers The Game, Lil Boosie, E-40, Baby, Angie Locc and Jadakiss. In 2007, a music video was released for "A Bay Bay (The Ratchet Remix)". The two versions for two music videos were for the remix only. The short version were featuring all of these artists (included their verses), except for E-40. However, E-40 did make the cameo appearance, alongside Webbie, Foxx, the whole Trill family, Pitbull and Lil Jon. The extended version features E-40's full appearance, along with his verse that he did on the remix. Big Kuntry King made his own remix to the song. Sincero, Chingo Bling and Pitbull made their own remix version to the song, titled "'Aye Wey Wey".

== Charts ==
=== Weekly charts ===
Chart (2007)	Peak position
New Zealand (Recorded Music NZ)	3
US Billboard Hot 100	7
US Hot R&B/Hip-Hop Songs (Billboard)	12
US Hot Rap Tracks (Billboard)	3
US Top Pop 100 (Billboard)	9
US Rhythmic (Billboard)	3

=== Year-end charts ===
Chart (2007)	Position
US Billboard Hot 100	56
US Hot R&B/Hip-Hop Songs (Billboard)	54
US Rhythmic (Billboard)	19

== In popular culture ==
- In "Clarifications", the eighth episode of season five of The Wire, the characters Chris and Snoop listen to "A Bay Bay" while driving through Baltimore.
- "A Bay Bay" was sampled in American singer Keri Hilson's 2025 single "Bae".
