= Halle Berry (She's Fine) =

Single by Hurricane Chris featuring Superstarr

from the album Unleashed
- Released: March 3, 2009
- Recorded: 2008
- Genre: Hip hop
- Length: 4:41 (album version); 4:51 (clean version)
- Label: Polo Grounds / J
- Songwriters: Christopher Dooley, Jamaal Parker
- Producers: Play-N-Skillz, Q Smith, Superstarr

Hurricane Chris singles chronology
| "Playas Rock" (2007) | "Halle Berry (She's Fine)" (2009) | "Headboard" (2009) |

"Halle Berry (She's Fine)" is the lead single by American rapper Hurricane Chris for his second studio album, Unleashed. It was released on March 3, 2009. The hip hop song features a guest appearance from Killeen, TX rapper Superstarr (also known as SVPA). It was co-produced by the latter, alongside Play-N-Skillz and Q Smith. The song originally belonged to Superstarr, who was signed to Play-N-Skillz, of whom sold the song to Hurricane Chris.

== Music video ==
The music video was released on April 29, 2009. The music video features a cameo appearance by a video vixen, named Ajia Nicole (who is a female model from Dallas, Texas).

== Track listing ==
CD single

1. "Halle Berry (She's Fine)" (featuring Superstarr) (Clean Version) – 4:50
2. "Halle Berry (She's Fine)" (featuring Superstarr) (Dirty Version) – 4:41
3. "Halle Berry (She's Fine)" (Instrumental) – 4:48

== Remixes ==
The remix to "Halle Berry (She's Fine)" was released, which features guest vocals from rappers to musicians; including Superstarr, Ludacris, Beenie Man, Lil Boosie, Yo Gotti, Pitbull, Yung Joc and C-Ride. The remix was mixed, and edited by Edwin Solano at the recording studios of JAMBOX Entertainment in midtown Manhattan, New York City.

== Charts ==
=== Weekly charts ===
| Chart (2009) | Peak position |
|---|---|
| US Billboard Hot 100 | 52 |
| US Hot R&B/Hip-Hop Songs (Billboard) | 7 |
| US Hot Rap Tracks (Billboard) | 7 |
| US Top Pop 100 (Billboard) | 70 |

=== Year-end charts ===
| Chart (2009) | Position |
|---|---|
| US Hot R&B/Hip-Hop Songs (Billboard) | 70 |
