= Unleashed (Hurricane Chris album) =

Studio album by Hurricane Chris
- Released: December 15, 2009
- Recorded: 2008–09
- Genre: Hip-hop
- Length: 33:27
- Label: Polo Grounds; J
- Producer: Christopher Dooley (also exec.); Bryan Leach (exec.); Anthony Murray (exec.); Q Smith; Play-N-Skillz; The Inkredibles; Shawty Redd; Superstarr; Phunk Dawg; Mouse; Rodnae; Fiend; Don Vito; Blade; Raphael Johnson

Hurricane Chris chronology
51/50 Ratchet (2007)	Unleashed (2009)	TBA (TBA)

Singles from Unleashed
- 1. "Halle Berry (She's Fine)" Released: April 15, 2009; 2. "Headboard" Released: September 4, 2009

Unleashed is the second studio album by American rapper Hurricane Chris. It was released on December 15, 2009, by Polo Grounds Music and J Records. This record would later be his final studio release with Polo Grounds and J Records. Recording sessions took place from 2008 to 2009, featuring the executive production from Hurricane Chris himself, alongside Bryan Leach and Anthony Murray. Aside from the executive production, the album features the production from Play-N-Skillz, Shawty Redd and Fiend, among others.

The album was supported by two singles: "Halle Berry (She's Fine)" featuring Superstarr, and "Headboard" featuring Mario and Plies, which both of these singles did not have success on the music charts. Upon its release, the album received mixed or average reviews from critics. Unleashed did not chart internationally, however, it reached at number 46 on the US Billboard's R&B/Hip-Hop Albums, and number 20 on the US Billboard's Top Rap Albums charts, respectively.

== Singles ==
The album's lead single, called "Halle Berry (She's Fine)", was released on April 15, 2009. The song features guest vocals from a fellow local rapper Superstarr; who later serves its production, along with the duo Play-N-Skillz and Q Smith on this track.

The album's second and final single, called "Headboard" was released on September 4, 2009. The song features guest vocals from American R&B singer-songwriter Mario and fellow American rapper Plies, with production by The Inkredibles.

== Reception ==
=== Commercial performance ===
In the United States, Unleashed peaked at number 46 on the Billboard's R&B/Hip-Hop Albums, and number 20 on the Billboard's Top Rap Albums charts. It did not chart internationally.

=== Critical response ===
Professional ratings
Aggregate scores
Source	Rating
Metacritic	(54/100)
Review scores
Source	Rating
AllMusic	3/5 stars
New York Times	(unfavorable)
Rolling Stone	2.5/5 stars
RapReviews	7/10 stars

Unleashed received mixed or average reviews from music critics. At Metacritic, which assigns a normalized rating out of 100 to reviews from mainstream critics, the album received an average score of 54, based on 4 reviews, which indicates "mixed or average reviews". David Jeffries of AllMusic gave the album three out of five stars. The New York Times' Jon Caramanica gave an unfavorable review. Rolling Stone gave the album two out of five stars. Steve Juon of RapReviews.com gave the highest rated review, seven out of ten stars.

== Track listing ==
No.	Title	Writer(s)	Producer(s)	Length
1.	"I'm Back"	Christopher Dooley; Demetrius Stewart	Shawty Redd	2:58
2.	"Beat It Out the Frame"	Dooley; Earl Williams	Phunk Dawg	3:16
3.	"Halle Berry (She's Fine)" (featuring Superstarr)	Dooley; Jamaal Parker	Play-N-Skillz; Q Smith; Superstarr	4:41
4.	"Coke Bottle" (featuring Mouse)	Jeremy Allen; Dooley	Mouse	4:14
5.	"Headboard" (featuring Mario and Plies)	Maurice Carpenter; Kevin Cossom; Dooley; Leigh Elliott; Johnny Mollings; Lenny Mollings; Algernod Washington	The Inkredibles	3:57
6.	"Last Call" (featuring Bobby Valentino)	Dooley; Robert Wilson; Rodney Young	Rodnae	4:39
7.	"I Want It" (featuring Fiend)	Dooley; Richard Jones	Fiend	3:51
8.	"Secret Lover" (featuring Cherish)	Oluwaseyi Agdeh; Dooley; Fallon King; Felisha King; Rodney Richard	Don Vito	4:02
9.	"No Worries" (featuring Beenie Man)	Brandon Bowles; Anthony Davis; Dooley; Richard	Don Vito; Blade	4:04
10.	"Hot Like Lava"	Dooley; Raphael Johnson	Johnson	2:47

== Personnel ==
Credits for Unleashed adapted from AllMusic.

- Oluwaseyi Agdeh – composer
- J. Allen – engineer
- Jeremy Allen – composer
- Mimi Armstrong – grooming
- Blade – engineer, producer
- Anita Marisa Boriboon – art direction
- Brandon Bowles – composer
- Ralph Cacciurri – engineer
- Chris Carmouche – mixing
- Maurice Carpenter – composer
- Kevin Cossom – composer
- Kenny "Kennymixx" Daniels – mastering
- Anthony Davis – composer
- Rick De Verona – engineer
- Scorp Dezel – producer
- Christopher Dooley – composer, executive producer
- Leigh Elliott – composer
- Scott Eraas – engineer
- Fiend – producer
- Pablo "Tonton" Gho – engineer
- John "Say" Gillard – engineer
- The Inkredibles – producer
- Amy Johnson – A&R, production coordination
- Raphael Johnson – composer, producer
- Richard Jones – composer
- Fallon King – composer
- Felisha King – composer
- Bryan Leach – executive producer
- Eddie Mix – engineer
- Johnny Mollings – composer
- Lenny Mollings – composer
- Mouse – producer
- Anthony Murray – executive producer
- Isis Nicholson – vocals
- Jamaal Parker – composer
- Shanieke Peru – stylist
- Phunk Dawg – producer
- Play – engineer
- Play N Skillz – producer
- Ari Raskin – engineer
- Rodney Richard – composer
- Rodnae – producer
- Ray Seay – mixing
- Derrick Selby – engineer
- Shawty Redd – producer
- Makeda Smith – A&R, production coordination
- Q. Smith – producer
- Demetrius Stewart – composer
- Superstarr – producer
- Don Vito – producer
- Miles Walker – engineer
- Algernod Washington – composer
- Earl Williams – composer
- Robert Wilson – composer
- Zach Wolfe – photography
- Shah Wonders – illustrations
- Rodney Young – composer

== Charts ==
Chart (2009)	Peak position
US R&B/Hip-Hop Albums (Billboard)	46
US Top Rap Albums (Billboard)	20
