= Playas Rock =

2007 single by Hurricane Chris

Single by Hurricane Chris featuring Boxie

from the album 51/50 Ratchet
- Released: December 15, 2007 (airplay)
- Recorded: 2007
- Genre: Hip hop, pop rap
- Label: Polo Grounds Music, J Records
- Producer: Mr. Collipark

Hurricane Chris singles chronology
| "Drop & Gimme 50" (2007) | "Playas Rock" (2007) | "Halle Berry (She's Fine)" (2009) |

"Playas Rock" is a song by American rapper Hurricane Chris, released by J Records and Polo Grounds Music on December 15, 2007 as the third single from his debut studio album, 51/50 Ratchet (2007). It was produced by American record producer Mr. Collipark, and features guest vocals from "Boxie", who remains unidentified to public sources.

== Chart performance ==
The single peaked at number 25 on the Hot Rap Tracks and number 47 on the Hot R&B Songs charts.

== Samples ==
The song contains a sample of "Love's Holiday", as performed by Earth, Wind and Fire.

== Music video ==
American singer Nicole Wray makes a cameo appearance in the music video.
