= 51/50 Ratchet =

Studio album by Hurricane Chris
- Released: October 23, 2007
- Recorded: 2006–07
- Genres: Hip-hop; southern hip-hop; crunk; R&B
- Length: 65:35
- Labels: Go Live; Young Mogul; Polo Grounds; J
- Producers: 3 Feet (exec.); Bryan Leach (exec.); Hollyhood Bay Bay (also exec.); Bigg Redd; Mr. Collipark (also exec.); Mr. Rogers; The Package Store; Lil Jon; Phunk Dawg; Stunt N' Dozier

Hurricane Chris chronology
51/50 Ratchet (2007)	Unleashed (2009)

Singles from 51/50 Ratchet
- 1. "A Bay Bay" Released: April 10, 2007; 2. "The Hand Clap" Released: August 8, 2007; 3. "Playas Rock" Released: December 15, 2007

51/50 Ratchet is the debut studio album by American rapper Hurricane Chris. It was released on October 23, 2007, by Go Live Entertainment, Young Mogul Entertainment, Polo Grounds Music and J Records. The album debuted at number 24 on the Billboard 200, with first week-sales of 26,000 copies in the United States.

The album was supported by three singles: "A Bay Bay", "The Hand Clap" featuring Big Poppa of The Ratchet City, and "Playas Rock" featuring Boxie.

== Singles ==
The album's lead single, called "A Bay Bay" was released on April 10, 2007. The song was produced by Phunk Dawg. The song peaked at number 7 on the US Billboard Hot 100.

The album's second single, called "The Hand Clap" was released on August 8, 2007. The song features guest appearance from Big Poppa of The Ratchet City, with Phunk Dawg, who also produced this track. The song peaked at number 47 on the US Billboard's Hot R&B/Hip-Hop Songs.

The album's third and final single, "Playas Rock" was released on December 15, 2007. The song features guest vocals from a local singer and an American R&B recording artist Boxie, while the production was provided by Mr. Collipark.

== Critical reception ==
Professional ratings
Review scores
Source	Rating
AllMusic	3/5 stars
DJBooth	3/5 stars
HipHopDX	2/5 stars
RapReviews	5/10
Rolling Stone	3/5 stars
XXL	(XL)

51/50 Ratchet received mixed reviews from music critics. Rolling Stone's Christian Hoard gave credit to the album for showcasing ratchet music and Chris's delivery, resembling that of Lil Wayne, concluding it "eventually runs short on ideas, but not before heralding a regional sound that Hurricane Chris milks for plenty of fun." Jason Birchmeier of AllMusic noted that Chris's delivery needs more time to develop for him to go beyond being an undistinguished rapper. Justin Chandler of RapReviews found the album lacking with tired production, overreliance on typical hip-hop clichés and Chris's performance doing little to distinguish himself, stating he "has plenty of time to legitimize himself as a rapper that has more to say than the shallow surface-level stuff, but for now he seems happy with just that."

== Track listing ==
All tracks are written by Christopher Dooley and collaborators.

No.	Title	Producer(s)	Length
1.	"Getting Money" (featuring Nicole Wray)	The Package Store; Mr. Collipark^{[a]}	3:57
2.	"A Bay Bay"	Phunk Dawg	5:06
3.	"Doin' My Thang" (featuring Big Poppa of Ratchet City)	Phunk Dawg	4:01
4.	"New Fashion"	The Package Store; Mr. Collipark^{[a]}	3:41
5.	"The Hand Clap" (featuring Big Poppa of Ratchet City and Hollyhood Bay Bay)	Phunk Dawg	4:21
6.	"Walk Like That"	Lil Jon	4:02
7.	"Touch Me"	The Package Store; Mr. Collipark^{[a]}	4:08
8.	"Leaving You"	Phunk Dawg	4:30
9.	"Do Something"	Phunk Dawg	4:23
10.	"Bang" (featuring Big Poppa of Ratchet City and Bigg Redd)	Bigg Redd	4:39
11.	"Beat in My Trunk"	The Package Store; Mr. Collipark^{[a]}	3:47
12.	"Playas Rock" (featuring Boxie)	Mr. Collipark	4:11
13.	"Momma" (featuring Nicole Wray)	Phunk Dawg	4:03
14.	"A Bay Bay (The Ratchet Remix)" (featuring The Game, Lil Boosie, E-40, Baby, Angie Locc & Jadakiss)	Phunk Dawg	7:11

Notes

- ^{^a} indicates co-producer.

== Charts ==
=== Weekly charts ===
Chart (2007)	Peak position
US Billboard 200	24
US Top R&B/Hip-Hop Albums (Billboard)	4
US Top Rap Albums (Billboard)	2

=== Year-end charts ===
Chart (2008)	Position
US Top R&B/Hip-Hop Albums (Billboard)	99
