= 12 Soulful Nights of Christmas =

Compilation album by Various artists
- Released: December 3, 1996
- Genre: R&B
- Length: 60:55
- Labels: So So Def; Columbia

12 Soulful Nights of Christmas is a compilation of Christmas songs released on December 3, 1996, through So So Def Recordings. In 1998, the album was reissued with two new songs.

== Critical reception ==
Professional ratings
Review scores
| Source | Rating |
|---|---|
| Allmusic | 2.5/5 stars |
| Entertainment Weekly | A |

The Orlando Weekly found the album "uneven", but highlighted Tamia's and Jagged Edge's renditions. In his review of the 1998 re-release, Marc Weingarten from Entertainment Weekly wrote that "why is the too-reverent yuletide offering 12 Soulful Nights of Christmas of slow jams from various R&B stars as stale as day-old fruitcake?" adding that "perhaps Dupri should’ve provided some nasty beats".

== Track listing ==
| No. | Title | Writer(s) | Producer(s) | Length |
|---|---|---|---|---|
| 1. | "The Time of Year" (Kenny Lattimore) | Kenny Lattimore; James Poyser; Vikter Duplaix | Kenny Lattimore; James Poyser; Vikter Duplaix | 4:47 |
| 2. | "Christmas Without You" (Xscape) | Brian McKnight | Brian McKnight | 4:07 |
| 3. | "In Love at Christmas" (K-Ci & JoJo) | Rory Bennett; JoJo Hailey; K-Ci Hailey | JoJo; Rory Bennett | 3:57 |
| 4. | "Little Drummer Girl" (Alicia Keys) | Katherine Kennicott Davis; Henry Onorati; Harry Simeone | Rodney Jerkins | 4:32 |
| 5. | "Someday at Christmas" (Voices of Soul^{[a]}) | Ron Miller; Bryan Wells | Gordon Williams; Kenneth Crouch (add.) | 4:42 |
| 6. | "Christmas Only Once a Year" (Chaka Khan) | Howard McCrary; Jeremy Lubbock; Robert Palmer; Chaka Khan; Melissa Vardey | Tony McAnany | 3:56 |
| 7. | "A Christmas Lullabye" (Faith Evans) | Seth Swirsky | Jermaine Dupri; Samuel J. Sapp III | 2:10 |
| 8. | "Because of His Love" (Brian McKnight) | Brian McKnight; Brandon Barnes | Brian McKnight | 4:05 |
| 9. | "The Christmas Song" (Tamia) | Robert Wells; Mel Tormé | Sapp III; Timothy L. Shider | 5:06 |
| 10. | "Christmas Without My Girl" (Gerald Levert) | Gerald Levert; Edwin Nicholas | Gerald Levert; Edwin "Tony" Nicholas | 4:29 |
| 11. | "Not Really Christmas" (Trina Broussard) | Israel Embry; Seth Swirsky; Trey Lorenz; Trina Broussard | Israel Embry; Trina Broussard (voc.) | 4:54 |
| 12. | "My Younger Days" (Trey Lorenz) | Jermaine Dupri; Manuel Seal; Freddie Hubbard | Jermaine Dupri; Manuel Seal (co.) | 4:33 |
| 13. | "Every Day Should Be Christmas" (NeeNa Lee) | Tim Thomas; Jonathan Curry | Tim Thomas; Jonathan Curry (co.) | 4:08 |
| 14. | "This Christmas" (Jagged Edge) | Carl Breeding; Darcy Aldridge; Brian Casey; Brandon Casey; Kyle Norman; Richard Wingo | Track Team; Flash Technology (co.) | 5:07 |

Notes

- ^{^[a]} Performed by Destiny's Child, Cassie, Alicia Keys, Jo Jo Robinson, Kimberly Scott, Blaque, Trina Broussard, Trina & Tamara, and Jagged Edge.
- "My Younger Days" contains a portion of "Red Clay", written by Freddie Hubbard, and performed by Jack Wilkins.
