= Headboard (song) =

2009 single by Mario, Plies, Hurricane Chris

Single by Hurricane Chris featuring Mario and Plies

from the album Unleashed
- Released: September 8, 2009
- Recorded: 2009
- Genre: Dirty rap; R&B
- Length: 4:00
- Label: Polo Grounds; J
- Songwriters: Maurice Carpenter, Kevin Cossom; Chris Dooley; Leigh Elliott; Johnny Mollings; Leonardo Mollings; Algernod Washington
- Producer: The Inkredibles

Hurricane Chris singles chronology
"Halle Berry (She's Fine)" (2009)	"Headboard" (2009)	"Bend It Over" (2012)

Mario singles chronology
"Thinkin' About You" (2009)	"Headboard" (2009)	"Ms. Chocolate" (2010)

Plies singles chronology
"Becky" (2009)	"Headboard" (2009)	"Wasted" (2009)

"Headboard" is the second single by American rapper Hurricane Chris from his second studio album, Unleashed. The song features guest appearances from Mario and Plies, while was production was handled by The Inkredibles.

== Music video ==
The music video was released on October 16, 2009.

== Charts ==
Chart	Peak position
US Hot R&B/Hip-Hop Songs (Billboard)	63
