= Kenny Lattimore (album) =

Studio album by Kenny Lattimore
- Released: May 14, 1996
- Length: 57:49
- Label: Columbia
- Producer: Jimmy Abney; Keith Crouch; J. Dibbs; Barry J. Eastmond; Dave Hall; Sam Kendrick; Kenny Lattimore; Kenny Lerum; Herb Middleton; Oji Pierce

Kenny Lattimore chronology
Kenny Lattimore (1996)	From the Soul of Man (1998)

Singles from Kenny Lattimore
- 1. "Never Too Busy" Released: April 1996; 2. "For You" Released: March 11, 1997

Kenny Lattimore is the debut studio album by American singer Kenny Lattimore. It was released on May 14, 1996, by Columbia Records. His first project after his departure from R&B boy band Maniquin, Lattimore worked with producers like Keith Crouch, Dave Hall, Oji Pierce, and Barry J. Eastmond on the album, some of whom would become frequent collaborators on future projects. Lyrically, he aimed to challenge stereotypes with a positive message, inspired by the emotional depth of artists like Luther Vandross.

Lattimore's debut album received mostly positive reviews, with critics praising his soulful style, smooth voice, and comparisons to R&B legends like Donny Hathaway. Kenny Lattimore initially charted modestly but gained traction over time, particularly after the top ten success of its third single "For You," reaching nunber 19 on the US Top R&B/Hip-Hop Albums chart. Eventually certified Gold by the Recording Industry Association of America (RIAA), it produced two further singles, including "Never Too Busy."

== Background ==
In 1987, still during his freshman year at Howard University, Lattimore became a member of the R&B group Maniquin. After the band had failed to achieve commercial breakthrough with its self-titled Epic Records-produced debut (1998), he left to pursue a solo career, prompting Maniquin's disbandment. Lattimore relocated to New York City where he was first signed by music executive Sylvia Rhone to EastWest Records. The material that he recorded with the label remained unreleased however. In 1995, Lattimore signed with Columbia Records. The label arranged for him to work with a variety of producers on his debut, including Keith Crouch, Barry J. Eastmond, Dave Hall, and Oji Pierce. Lyrically, Lattimore aimed to create a very positive album, one that would challenge and expand the often narrow, stereotypical portrayals of African-American men. In an interview with Billboard, he elaborated: "I'd rather be a good communicator and a strong but sensitive [singer]. As a new singer, 'm trying to give audiences the kind of passion that artists like Luther Vandross represent."

== Promotion ==
Columbia Records released "Never Too Busy," co-written and produced by Dave Hall, as the album's leading single in April 1996. It reached number 89 on the US Billboard Hot 100 and cracked the top 20 of the Hot R&B/Hip-Hop Songs chart, peaking at number 19. Keith Crouch-produced "Just What It Takes" was issued as the second single from Kenny Lattimore. Less successful, it peaked at number 55 on the Hot R&B/Hip-Hop Songs and reached the top 30 of the Adult R&B Songs chart. "For You," the album's third and final single, made an even higher impact, reaching number 33 on the Billboard Hot 100 and number six on the Hot R&B/Hip-Hop Songs. A huge success on the adult contemporary section, it also charted at number-one hit on Billboard's Adult R&B Songs. The song held the chart's top spot for 17 weeks that year, and at the time, was the song with the most weeks at number-one in the chart's history, from its 1993 launch.

== Critical reception ==
Professional ratings
Review scores
Source	Rating
AllMusic	3/5 stars
Entertainment Weekly	A−

Kenny Lattimore earned largely positive reviews from music critics. Entertainment Weekly's Cheo Tyehimba hailed Kenny Lattimore as an album that hearkened back to the time of Donny Hathaway and Marvin Gaye when "R&B had more soul." AllMusic editor Leo Stanley found that "despite an inconsistent collection of songs, Kenny Lattimore's eponymous debut album is a promising record, showcasing his smooth voice to fine effect. His singing and the slick production makes the weaker numbers enjoyable, but when he's given a good song [...] the depth of Lattimore's talent becomes apparent." Paul Verna from Billboard felt that the album "toes the line with charismatic soul tracks that caress and soothe the ear" and that Lattimore's "subdued approach to music should perk the ears of mature teens and young adults in search of a hip yet relaxing vibe."

== Chart performance ==
The album entered low on the charts but gained momentum, especially following the success of "For You." While it initially managed to chart on Billboard's US Top R&B/Hip-Hop Albums chart only, reaching a peak of number 19, it later also debuted at number 197 on the US Billboard 200, before peaking at number 92 in the week of May 3, 1997. The same month, Billboard reported that Kenny Lattimore had sold 240,000 units domestically. On July 7, 1997, the album was certified Gold by the Recording Industry Association of America (RIAA). By August 1998, it had sold more than 527,000 copies domestically.

== Track listing ==
Sourced from

No.	Title	Writer(s)	Producer(s)	Length
1.	"Never Too Busy"	Dave "Jam" Hall; Kipper Jones	Hall	5:31
2.	"Just What It Takes"	Keith Crouch; Jones	Crouch	5:04
3.	"I Won't Let You Down"	Lattimore; Hall; Jones; Cecil Womack; Linda Womack; Gip Noble, Jr.	Hall	4:59
4.	"All I Want"	Lattimore; Herb Middleton	Middleton	4:53
5.	"Forever"	Lattimore; Middleton	Middleton	4:48
6.	"For You"	Kenny Lerum	Barry J. Eastmond	3:57
7.	"Joy"	Lattimore; Darren Jenkins	J. Dibbs	4:36
8.	"Where Did Love Go"	Lattimore; Jenkins; Sam Kendrick	J. Dibbs	4:13
9.	"Forgiveness"	Jones; Kenneth Crouch	Crouch; Jones	4:09
10.	"Always Remember"	Lattimore; Jones; Oji Pierce	Jones; Pierce	5:42
11.	"Climb the Mountain"	Jimmy Abney	Abney	5:49
12.	"I Won't Forget (Whose I Am)"	Lattimore	Lattimore; Kendrick	4:05
Total length:				57:49

International bonus track

No.	Title	Writer(s)	Producer(s)	Length
13.	"Everyday"	Lattimore; Gary Brown; Eastmond	Eastmond	4:39

Sample credits

- "I Won't Let You Down" contains a sample from "Love T.K.O." (1980).

== Personnel ==
Credits adapted from the liner notes of Kenny Lattimore.

Performers and musicians

- Jimmy Abney – congas
- Glenn Arthur – guitar
- Al Brown – contractor
- J. Dibbs – music, programming
- Barry J. Eastmond – keyboards, programming
- Derrick Edmonson – saxophone
- Dave "Jam" Hall – keyboards
- Lilly Haydn – violin
- Richard Henrickson – concertmaster
- Raymond Jenkins – guitar
- Kenny Lattimore – vocalist
- Kenny Lerum – keyboards, programming
- Glenn McKinney – guitar
- Cameron Stone – cello
- George Wademius – acoustic guitar

Technical

- Jimmy Abney – engineer, producer
- Tina Antoine – recording engineer
- Bobby Brooks – recording engineer
- Keith Crouch – producer, recording engineer
- Kenneth Crouch – producer, recording engineer
- J. Dibbs – mixing engineer, producer
- Lester Drayton – recording engineer
- Barry J. Eastmond – producer
- Dave Frazer – mixing engineer
- Jeff Graham – assistant engineer
- Dave "Jam" Hall – arranger, producer, recording engineer
- Booker T. Jones – mixing engineer
- Kipper Jones – arranger, producer
- Sam Kendrick – producer
- Kenny Lattimore – producer
- Eugene Lo – recording engineer
- Paul Logus – mixing engineer
- Victor McCoy – recording engineer
- Herb Middleton – producer
- Mark Partis – recording engineer
- Oji Pierce – producer
- Marc Reyburn – assistant engineer
- Mario Rodríguez – recording engineer

== Charts ==
=== Weekly charts ===
Weekly chart performance for Kenny Lattimore
Chart (1996)	Peak position
US Billboard 200	92
US Top R&B/Hip-Hop Albums (Billboard)	19

=== Year-end charts ===
Year-end chart performance for Kenny Lattimore
Chart (1996)	Position
US Top R&B/Hip-Hop Albums (Billboard)	98

== Certifications ==
Certifications for Kenny Lattimore
Region	Certification	Certified units/sales
United States (RIAA)	Gold	500,000^{^}
^{^} Shipments figures based on certification alone.
