= Weekend (Kenny Lattimore album) =

Studio album by Kenny Lattimore
- Released: October 9, 2001
- Length: 46:25
- Label: Arista
- Producers: Battlecat; The Characters; Dre & Vidal; Drop Squad; George Duke; Travon Potts; Raphael Saadiq; Joshua P. Thompson; Reed Vertelney

Kenny Lattimore chronology
From the Soul of Man (1998)	Weekend (2001)	Things That Lovers Do (2003)

Singles from Weekend
- 1. "Weekend" Released: August 13, 2001; 2. "Don't Deserve" Released: 2001

Weekend is the third studio album of American singer Kenny Lattimore. It was released by Arista Records on October 9, 2001 in the United States. The album marked Lattimore's debut with the label, following his departure from Columbia Records. As part of this transition, he not only overhauled his management team but also brought in a host of new collaborators to help shape the project, including producers Battlecat, The Characters, Dre & Vidal, George Duke, Travon Potts, Raphael Saadiq, and Reed Vertelney.

The album received mixed reviews, with some critics praising its upbeat production and fresh collaborations, while others found it conventional and lacking depth. Weekend opened and peaked at number 63 on the US Billboard 200 and number 24 on the Top R&B/Hip-Hop Albums chart, marking Lattimore's highest entry on the Billboard 200 yet. It was preceded by its same-titled lead single, a top 20 hit on the US Adult R&B Songs chart. "Don't Deserve" served as Weekend's second single.

== Background ==
With his third studio album, Lattimore moved from Columbia Records to Arista Records. Following his collaborations with Sylvia Rhone and Clive Davis, he now worked with L.A. Reid, who encouraged him to record younger, hit-oriented material for his next project rather than progress further into the introspective soul territory of his previous release From the Soul of Man (1998). Reid and Lattimore enlisted a variety of new und upcoming producers to record with him, including duos The Characters and Dre & Vidal as well as Raphael Saadiq, Reed Vertelney and Battlecat. In a sharp contrast to previous releases, Lattimore also scaled back his contributions as a songwriter in favor of experimenting with younger talent, including Johnta Austin, who co-wrote "Can You Feel Me." In a September 2001 interview with Billboard, Lattimore elaborated: "I wanted to make a fun, straight-up R&B album. I have the party feel of a song like "Weekend," yet I still have tracks like "Can You Feel Me" that go back to my classic R&B roots."

== Promotion ==
Midtempo, old-school-influenced "Weekend," co-written by Troy Taylor and produced by The Characters, was issued by Arista Records as the album's first single on August 13, 2001. Interpolating the bassline of Blondie's classic "Rapture," it reached number 51 on the US Hot R&B/Hip-Hop Songs, number 24 on the US R&B/Hip-Hop Airplay and number twelve on the US Adult R&B Songs chart. Less successful follow-up "Don't Deserve," co-written by Shep Crawford, failed to chart on the Hot R&B/Hip-Hop Songs chart but peaked at number 25 on the Adult R&B Songs chart.

== Critical reception ==
Professional ratings
Review scores
Source	Rating
AllMusic	2/5 stars
Entertainment Weekly	B+
USA Today	2.5/4 stars

Billboard critic Chuck Taylor wrote that "with a feelgood rhythm that celebrates everybody's favorite part of the week and slick production by the Characters, "Weekend" may revive the Washington D.C., native's momentum on R&B and AC stations." Entertainment Weekly's Cheo Tyehimba noted that with Weekend, Lattimore "has added up-tempo beats and hip vocal arrangements and choruses to his smooth sound. The catchiest track, "Weekend," represents the feel of most of the album – a carefree, like-you're-in-love-and-you-just-got-paid reverie. Lattimore's still a class act, but collaborators [like] The Characters, Raphael Saadiq, and Battlecat help him find his funky, playful side, too."

USA Today's Steve Jones wrote that Weekend leaned toward "radio-friendly fare" with "cool ballads and easygoing midtempo songs," shining on tracks like "Who" and "Can You Feel Me," though the album was "just a little too relaxed" at times. Courtney Kemp from Amazon.com felt that Weekend was "more conventional than its predecessor, playing it safe with Babyface-style ballads and "Girl, I can treat you better than him" lyrics [...] it lives up to its name--relaxing, romantic, sweet, and over far too soon." AllMusic editor Liana Jonas found that Weekend "with its bland arrangements, cookie-cutter R&B sound, and lyrical vacuity, is a yawn. Hookin' up, the inability to breathe without "the one," and other hackneyed themes abound on this banal album. There isn't enough groove or vibrato, shirt-clutching vocals to keep listeners from growing bored, and fast. Find something else to do this weekend."

== Commercial performance ==
Weekend opened and peaked at number numer 63 on the US Billboard 200 and number 24 on the Top R&B/Hip-Hop Albums chart. Whlile it marked Lattimore's highest placing on the former chart, it was his first album to miss the top 20 on the R&B/Hip-Hop Albums chart. Lattimore later stated that the album ended up "not being as balanced" as previous project.

== Track listing ==
Weekend track listing
No.	Title	Writer(s)	Producer(s)	Length
1.	"Weekend"	Lattimore; Charles Farrar; Chris Stein; Deborah Harry; Eritza Laues; LaMenga Kafi; Todd Huston; Troy Taylor	The Characters	4:38
2.	"Baby You're the One"	Farrar; J. Baptise; Taylor	The Characters	4:10
3.	"Come to Me"	Lattimore; Kevin Gilliam; Raphael Saadiq	Saadiq; Battlecat	4:42
4.	"Can You Feel Me" (featuring Shanice)	Farrar; Johnta Austin; Taylor	The Characters	4:57
5.	"If Love Is What You Want"	Farrar; Austin; Taylor	The Characters	4:26
6.	"Lately"	Lattimore; Carvin Haggins; H. Harris; Vidal Davis; Jill Scott	Dre & Vidal	4:22
7.	"Don't Deserve"	Lattimore; Shep Crawford	Drop Squad	3:52
8.	"Right Down to It"	Daryl Simmons; L.A. Reid; Kenneth Edmonds	The Characters	4:18
9.	"The Things I'll Do"	Lattimore; Travon Potts	Potts	3:58
10.	"Who"	Martin Kember; Reed Vertelney	Vertelney	4:16
11.	"Healing"	Lattimore; George Duke	Duke	2:46

Japanese bonus track
No.	Title	Writer(s)	Producer(s)	Length
12.	"Goodbye Serenade"	Philip White; Quincy Patrick; Joshua P. Thompson	Thompson	4:40

Samples

- "Weekend" contains replayed elements from "Rapture", performed by Blondie.

== Personnel ==
Credits adapted from the liner notes of Weekend.

Performers and musicians

- Christopher "Pops" Crawford – guitar
- Daniel Crawford – keyboards
- Shep Crawford – instruments
- Vidal Davis – drums
- George Duke – piano
- Terence Elliott – guitar
- LaMenga Ford – backing vocalist
- M.B. Gordy – percussion
- Reggie Hamilton – bass
- Andre Harris – electric piano
- Derrick Hodge – bass
- Kenny Lattimore – backing vocalist, lead vocalist
- Eritza Laues – backing vocalist
- Jerry Peters – organ
- Travon Potts – instruments
- Marc Nelson – backing vocalist
- Oliver Reed – keyboards
- Raphael Saadiq – drum programming, keyboards
- Shanice – backing vocalist, guest vocalist
- Troy Taylor – backing vocalist, instruments
- Reed Vertelney – keyboards, drums
- Phillip "Silky" White – backing vocalist

Technical

- Johntá Austin – vocal producer
- Battlecat – producer
- The Characters – producer
- Shep Crawford – vocal arranger
- Dre & Vidal – producer
- Drop Squad – producer
- George Duke – producer
- Kenny Lattimore – vocal arranger
- Travon Potts – producer
- Raphael Saadiq – producer
- Jill Scott – vocal arranger
- Troy Taylor – vocal producer
- Joshua P. Thompson – producer
- Reed Vertelney – arranger, producer

== Charts ==
Chart performance for Weekend
Chart (2001)	Peak position
US Billboard 200	63
US Top R&B/Hip-Hop Albums (Billboard)	24
