= For You (Kenny Lattimore song) =

1997 single by Kenny Lattimore

Single by Kenny Lattimore

from the album Kenny Lattimore
- Released: March 11, 1997
- Recorded: 1995
- Length: 3:57
- Label: Columbia
- Songwriter: Kenny Lerum
- Producer: Barry Eastmond

Kenny Lattimore singles chronology
"Just What It Takes" (1996)	"For You" (1997)	"Days Like This" (1998)

Music video
- "For You" on YouTube

"For You" is a song by American singer Kenny Lattimore. It was written by Kenny Lerum and produced by Barry Eastmond for his eponymous debut album (1996). The song was released by Columbia Records and issued as the album's third and final single in March 1997. Lattimore's only hit to date, it peaked at number 33 on the Billboard Hot 100 and number six on the Hot R&B/Hip-Hop Songs chart. "For You" received a Grammy Award nomination for Best Male R&B Vocal Performance at the 40th Grammy Awards.

== Background ==
"For You" was written by Lattimore's high-school friend Kenny Lerum. Not expressly penned for Lattimore, Lerum originally wrote "For You" with his wife in mind. Lattimore first sang the song at Lerum's 1993 wedding reception and later asked to record it when preparing a demo tape. During the recording sessions for "For You," Lattimore later flipped that song's bridge, feeling it needed more pizzazz.

== Accolades ==
The song received a Grammy Award nomination in the Best Male R&B Vocal Performance category at the 40th Grammy Awards. It lost to R. Kelly's song I Believe I Can Fly."

== Commercial performance ==
"For You" became Lattimore's biggest hit yet. It peaked at number 33 on the US Billboard Hot 100 and number six on the Hot R&B/Hip-Hop Songs chart, marking his first and only appearance in the top 40 of the Hot 100 and the top 10 of the R&B chart. A huge success on the adult contemporary section of the R&B charts, it also charted at number-one hit on Billboard's Adult R&B Songs. It held the chart's top spot for 17 weeks that year, and at the time, was the song with the most weeks at number-one in the chart's history, from its 1993 launch. Its record was broken by Maxwell' "Fortunate" in 1999. By August 1998, it had sold more than 391,000 copies domestically.

== Music video ==
The official music video for the song was directed by Okuwah Garrett.

== Track listing ==
CD single
No.	Title	Writer(s)	Length
1.	"For You" (single version)	Kenny Lerum	3:56
2.	"For You" (spanish version)	Lerum; The Jalapeños Brothers	3:57

== Charts ==
=== Weekly charts ===
Weekly chart performance for "For You"
Chart (1997)	Peak position
US Billboard Hot 100	33
US Hot R&B/Hip-Hop Songs (Billboard)	6
US Rhythmic Airplay (Billboard)	40

=== Year-end charts ===
Year-end chart performance for "For You"
Chart (1997)	Position
US Hot R&B/Hip-Hop Songs (Billboard)	15
