= Things That Lovers Do =

Studio album by Kenny Lattimore & Chanté Moore
- Released: February 11, 2003
- Length: 58:08
- Label: Arista
- Producers: Junius Bervine; Jamey Jaz; Jimmy Jam & Terry Lewis; James Poyser; Daryl Simmons; Richard Jon Smith

Kenny Lattimore chronology
Weekend (2001)	Things That Lovers Do (2003)	Uncovered/Covered (2006)

Chanté Moore chronology
Exposed (2000)	Things That Lovers Do (2003)	Uncovered/Covered (2006)

Singles from Things That Lovers Do
- 1. "Loveable (From Your Head to Your Toes)" Released: 2002; 2. "You Don't Have to Cry" Released: 2003

Things That Lovers Do is the debut collaborative studio album by American singers and real-life couple Kenny Lattimore and Chanté Moore. It was released by Arista Records on February 11, 2003 in the United States. The album includes covers of classic 1970's and 1980's soul duets by singers Karyn White and Babyface, Marvin Gaye and Tammi Terrell, and more. The then-couple worked with producers Jamey Jaz, Jimmy Jam & Terry Lewis, James Poyser, and Daryl Simmons on much of the project.

The album received mixed reviews, with some praising its sensual R&B style and vocal chemistry, while others found the performances technically solid but emotionally lacking. Commercially, Things That Lovers Do became the highest-charting album for both singers, reaching number 31 on the US Billboard 200 and number three on the Top R&B/Hip-Hop Albums chart. The album spawned two singles, including original track "Loveable (From Your Head to Your Toes)" and the René & Angela cover "You Don't Have to Cry."

== Background ==
Michael Mauldin conceived the idea of their pairing up on a duet albums. According to executive producer Antonio Reid, the album release was timed to coincide with Valentine's Day. The album artwork bears a "warning" on the back stating that the CD "may cause pregnancy," making reference to the fact that Chante became pregnant with the couple's first child during the recording of the album. Shortly after the release of the album and close of the stage play, she gave birth to a son named Kenneth Lattimore Jr. on April 10, 2003, the same date as his father's birthday.

== Promotion ==
Original track "Loveable (From Your Head to Your Toes)," produced by duo Jimmy Jam & Terry Lewis, was released as the lead single from Things That Lovers Do in 2002. Co-producer by The Avila Brothers, it reached number 19 on the US Adult R&B Songs chart. "You Don't Have to Cry," a duet by René Moore and Angela Winbush from the duo's 1985 collaborative album Street Called Desire, was issued as the album's second single in 2003. The song peaked at number 30 on the US Adult R&B Songs chart.

Lattimore and Moore took an unorthodox route to promoting their album by mounting a full stage show also titled Things That Lovers Do. The play toured through Richmond, New York, Chicago, Philadelphia, Atlanta, Washington, DC, Pittsburgh, and Detroit from January 2003 through March 2003. Also starring in the play were comedian/actress Kym Whitley and actor Clifton Powell who plays a less-than-deserving fiancé to Chante's character. The play was directed and staged by Tony Award-winner George Faison.

== Critical reception ==
Professional ratings
Review scores
Source	Rating
AllMusic	3.5/5 stars
Entertainment Weekly	C−

Michael Paoletta from Billboard called Things That Lovers Do one of the best "non-hip hop R&B album in eons" and described it as "fire and desire, from a couple in love." AllMusic stated that the album "luckily lives up to its claims, delivering an old-school-inspired slice of sweet slow-jam music that sounds like it could inspire more action than Barry White's waterbed [...] A modern R&B classic in the making, Things That Lovers Do combines the best of old and new R&B to create what may very well be the ultimate make-out album."

People wrote that Lattimore and Moore "make a perfect musical marriage on this candlelight collection of duets, including 10 classic-soul covers plus two new songs [...] Best is their radiant rendition of Billy Preston and Syreeta’s 1980 hit “With You I’m Born Again,” on which Lattimore and Moore seem born to sing together." Craig Seymour from Entertainment Weekly found that "the results are exquisitely competent and utterly boring. Both singers have fine voices, especially the Minnie Riperton-like Moore. But their pairings consistently lack heat and seem to be more about politeness than passion."

== Commercial performance ==
Things That Lovers Do debuted and peaked at number thirty-one on the US Billboard 200 and number three on the US Top R&B/Hip-Hop Albums chart, with first week sales of 47,000 units. The album also peaked at number three on the Top R&B/Hip-Hop Albums chart. This marked the highest peak for both singers on both charts. Billboard ranked Things That Lovers Do 74th on its 2003 Top R&B/Hip-Hop Albums chart.

== Track listing ==
Things That Lovers Do track listing
No.	Title	Writer(s)	Producer(s)	Length
1.	"Things That Lovers Do"	The Avila Brothers; Jimmy Jam & Terry Lewis	Jam & Lewis	4:34
2.	"You Don't Have to Cry"	René Moore; Angela Winbush	Daryl Simmons	4:45
3.	"With You I'm Born Again"	Carol Connors; David Shire	Simmons	3:21
4.	"Love Saw It"	Simmons; L.A. Reid; Kenneth Edmonds	Jamie Hawkins; Chris Absolam; Richard Smith	3:54
5.	"Loveable (From Your Head to Your Toes)"	Chanté Moore; The Avila Brothers; Jam & Lewis	Jam & Lewis	5:19
6.	"You're All I Need to Get By"	Nickolas Ashford; Valerie Simpson	Jamey Jaz	4:16
7.	"When I Said I Do"	Clint Black	Simmons	4:54
8.	"Close the Door"	Kenny Gamble; Leon Huff	Simmons	6:17
9.	"Here We Go"	Art Phillips; Richard Rudolph	James Poyser; Junius Bervine	4:35
10.	"Is It Still Good to You"	Ashford; Simpson	Simmons	4:38
11.	"Make It Last Forever"	Keith Sweat; Teddy Riley	Simmons	4:36
12.	"Still"	Lionel Richie	Simmons	6:59
Total length:				58:08

== Charts ==
=== Weekly charts ===
Weekly chart performance for Things That Lovers Do
Chart (2003)	Peak position
US Billboard 200	31
US Top R&B/Hip-Hop Albums (Billboard)	3

=== Year-end charts ===
Year-end chart performance for Things That Lovers Do
Chart (2003)	Position
US Top R&B/Hip-Hop Albums (Billboard)	74

== Release history ==
List of release dates, showing region, formats, label, and reference
Region	Date	Format	Label
United States	February 11, 2003	CD; digital download	Arista Records
Europe	February 11, 2003	CD; digital download	Arista Records
