= Hurricane Chris (rapper) =

American rapper

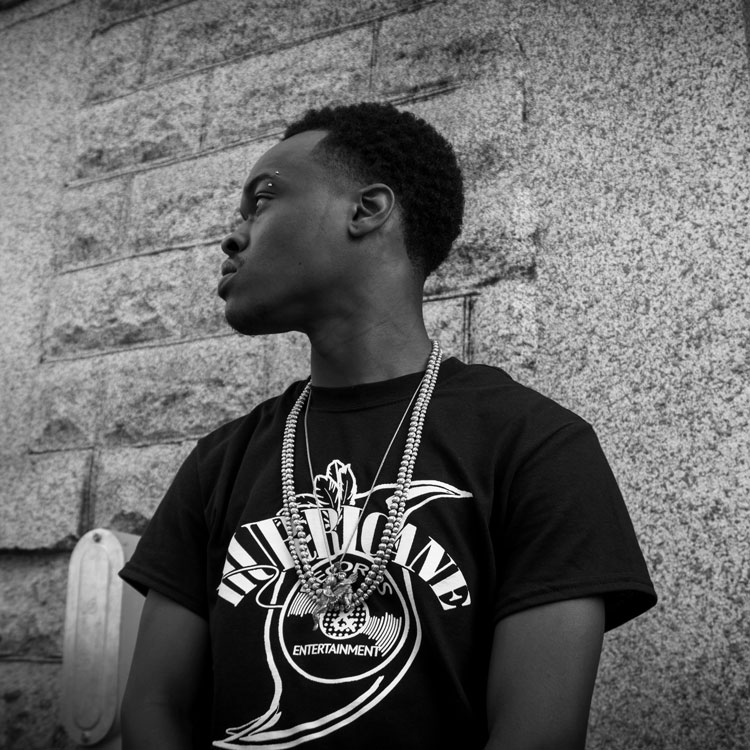
- Hurricane Chris at SXSW 2016

Background information
- Also known as: Hurricane
- Born: Christopher Jerrod Dooley Jr. Shreveport, Louisiana, U.S.
- Genre: Southern hip-hop
- Occupations: Rapper; songwriter
- Years active: 2006–present
- Labels: Tha Lights Global; Foundation Media; 51/50; Polo Grounds; J; Rap-A-Lot 4 Life
- Children: 1
- Website: everythinghurricane.com

Christopher Jerrod Dooley Jr., known professionally as Hurricane Chris, is an American rapper. He is best known for his 2007 debut single "A Bay Bay", which peaked at number seven on the Billboard Hot 100.The song preceded his debut studio album 51/50 Ratchet (2007), which moderately entered the Billboard 200 and saw unfavorable critical response. His second album, Unleashed (2009), failed to chart, but yielded moderate chart success from its lead single, "Halle Berry (She's Fine)".

== Early life ==
Dooley was born in an impoverished area of Shreveport, Louisiana. Growing up dooley affiliated himself with Grove Boys 19 - 19 NTG Crips a Crip Affiliated Set in Shreveport, Louisiana. He began writing songs at 10 years old, and performed at high school talent shows while still in elementary. He attended Southwood High School, but graduated from Huntington High School.

== Career ==
=== 2007–08: Major label signing and breakthrough with 51/50 Ratchet ===
In early 2007, Chris released a mixtape titled You Hear Me? under the moniker Hurricane, which garnered local attention and earned him a major label recording contract. On April 10, 2007, Chris released his debut commercial single, "A Bay Bay". The song was produced by Phunk Dawg. The song peaked at #7 on the US Billboard 100. On August 8, Chris released his second commercial single, "The Hand Clap", also produced by Phunk Dawg. On August 17, Chris released the mixtape Louisi-Animal, which included a remix of "A Bay Bay" featuring guest appearances from rappers the Game, Lil Boosie, E-40, Baby, Angie Locc and Jadakiss.

On October 23, 2007, Chris released his debut studio album, titled 51/50 Ratchet. The album debuted at number 24 on the US Billboard 200, selling 60,000 copies in the first week. It was released through Polo Grounds Music and J Records.

=== 2009–10: Unleashed ===
On March 3, 2009, Chris released the first official single, called "Halle Berry (She's Fine)". The song features guest vocals from fellow local American rapper Superstarr, who also served as producer alongside Play-N-Skillz, and Q Smith. On September 8, Chris released the second official single, called "Headboard". The song features guest appearances from Mario, and Plies, with production by the Inkredibles.

On December 21, Chris released his second studio album, titled Unleashed. Unleashed did not chart internationally, however, the record peaked at number 46 on the US Billboard's Top R&B/Hip-Hop Albums chart, and number 20 on the US Billboard's Top Rap Albums chart.

=== 2010–present: Releasing music and other ventures ===
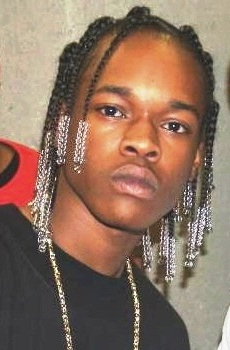
Hurricane Chris in 2007

After releasing several mixtapes and singles between mid-2010 and early 2012, Chris released his single, titled "Bend It Over" (oftentimes incorrectly titled as "Bend It Ova") on March 12, 2012. On January 2, 2013, Chris released his new mixtape, titled Caniac. On May 11, 2014, Chris released his single, titled "Ratchet". The song features guest appearances from Lil Boosie.

On August 21, 2015, Chris released his new single, called "Sections". The song features guest appearance from Ty Dolla Sign. On September 4, Chris released his new mixtape, titled Hurricane Season. The tape features productions from DJ Mustard, Hitmaka, DubMagic Roe and Drumma Boy, among others.

On September 5, 2025, Chris collaborated on the track POPPIN’ MY S***, featured on Justin Bieber’s album SWAG II.

== Personal life ==
In 2020, Dooley was arrested and charged with the June 19th, 2020 murder of Danzeria Farris Jr in Shreveport, Louisiana. Throughout the trial, Dooley maintained his innocence claiming that Farris was attempting to steal his Mercedes-Benz and that he acted in self defense. On March 14th, 2023, Dooley was found not guilty of the crime.

Dooley has one child, a son born in 2013.

== Discography ==
- 51/50 Ratchet (2007)
- Unleashed (2009)
