= Uncovered/Covered =

Studio album by Kenny Lattimore & Chanté Moore
- Released: October 10, 2006
- Genre: R&B
- Length: 101:17
- Labels: LaFace; Verity; Sony BMG
- Producers: Larry Campbell; Carvin & Ivan; Eddie Cole; Bryan-Michael Cox; Barry Eastmond; Lamont Fleming; Donell Hogan; Mark Hamilton; Nicole Hamilton; Fred Hammond; Kenny Lattimore; Jamal McCoy; WyldCard

Kenny Lattimore chronology
Things That Lovers Do (2003)	Uncovered/Covered (2006)	Timeless (2008)

Chanté Moore chronology
Things That Lovers Do (2003)	Uncovered/Covered (2006)	Love the Woman (2008)

Singles from Uncovered/Covered
- 1. "Tonight (2-Step)"; 2. "Figure It Out"; 3. "Make Me Like The Moon"

Uncovered/Covered is the second collaborative studio album by American singers and then-real-life couple Kenny Lattimore and Chanté Moore. It was released by LaFace Records and Verity through Sony BMG on October 10, 2006, in the United States. Formatted as a double album, the two-disc set consists of Uncovered, a disc of R&B songs, and Covered, a disc of gospel songs that were primarily produced by Fred Hammond. Uncovered/Covered received a Stellar Award nomination for Best Contemporary Group/Duo of the Year.

== Background ==
Originally the album was recorded as a single disc titled Uncovered and scheduled for release in November 2005. The title was chosen as a double entendre representing the "uncovered truth behind the ups and downs in a marriage," as well as denoting a departure from their previous release which was a cover album. In keeping with the album theme of love established on their previous album Things That Lovers Do (2003), the bulk of Uncovered/Covered addresses the subject from to aspects, with the first disc examining the romantic aspect of love.

The second disc addresses its spiritual aspect. At the time of the release of lead single "Tonight," Lattimore and Moore's follow-up was planned to be a single disc follow-up simply titled Uncovered. Verity Records president Max Siegel requested that they record a gospel component to the disc after a standout performance at the Stellar Awards in 2006. Though both singers were primarily known for their contributions to R&B music by then, the couple found that they were "no strangers to the gospel genre." Prior to releasing his debut album, Lattimore was a featured vocalist on gospel artist William Becton's album Broken. As for Moore, she enlisted BeBe Winans to produce the gospel song "Because You're Mine" on her 1992 debut Precious. Save for a single track, the second disc, which would be titled Covered, was produced by gospel hitmaker Fred Hammond.

== Singles ==
The first original song released to the public was the uptempo single "Tonight (2-Step)" which playfully incorporates into the chorus a bit of the 1965 Bacharach/David anthem "What the World Needs Now Is Love." Closer to the release of the double album, the song "Figure It Out" was written and recorded with producer Bryan-Michael Cox, added to the album and released as a single. "Figure It Out" reached number 24 on the Bubbling Under R&B/Hip-Hop Singles chart, and number 37 on the Adult R&B Songs.

== Critical reception ==
Professional ratings
Review scores
Source	Rating
AllMusic	3.5/5 stars
Vibe	3/5 stars

Andy Kellman of AllMusic expressed that Lattimore and Moore "keep it elegant and romantic the whole time". He praised their performances, writing "Lattimore sounds as good as ever through the whole program, but his long-under-recognized wife shines so well, ably approaching nearly every song at a different angle, that he's pretty much outclassed." Natasha Washington for News OK, similarly expressed that "at times, Moore outshines Lattimore in song, but each track's message is heartfelt." She also said that "the Uncovered disc almost sounds like a marriage seminar as Lattimore and Moore share personal insight on the ups and downs of relationships, while Covered shares heartfelt praise and devotion of God's undeserved favor toward everyone." She remarked that "while Uncovered/Covered contains many familiar soulful duets, the couple's sincerity casts aside doubts that the project is merely a studio invention." Chris Rizik from SoulTracks heralded the album as "a real triumph – a disc that captures their intelligent, thoughtful thesis of love and marriage and combines it with a level of sincere spirituality, all wrapped in a beautiful, creative musical tapestry' before noting 'it is flat out one of the best adult soul albums you'll hear this year."

Andree Farias of Crosswalk.com found that "the Uncovered disc is the romantic portion, a breezy affair full of smooth R&B numbers; Covered, on the other hand, covers the spiritual spectrum to a more urbanized contemporary gospel style." She noted that "neither disc is all that didactic or revealing in their fields, offering instead tried-and-true generalities about what it means to love God and love each other, but they're nonetheless heartfelt."

== Commercial performance ==
Uncovered/Covered debuted and peaked at number 95 on the US Billboard 200 chart on the issue date October 28, 2006. It fell to number 176 the following week, spending a total of 2 weeks on the chart. On the Top R&B/Hip-Hop Albums chart, the album appeared for a total of 11 weeks, peaking at number 10 in its first. On the Top Gospel Albums chart, Uncovered/Covered peaked at number 2 in its first week, remaining in the top 10 for 4 weeks and appearing for a total of 29 weeks on the chart. Billboard ranked it 41st on the 2006 US Top Gospel Albums year-end chart.

== Track listing ==
Credits adapted from the liner notes of Uncovered/Covered.

Disc 1: Uncovered
No.	Title	Writer(s)	Producer(s)	Length
1.	"Uncovered" (Intro)	Donell Jones; Donell Hogan	Hogan	0:54
2.	"Love Ballad"	Skip Scarborough	Barry J. Eastmond	5:14
3.	"The Good Life"	Chanté Moore; Carvin "Ransum" Haggins; Ivan "Orthodox" Barias; Jamal McCoy	Carvin & Ivan; Jamal^{[a]}	3:13
4.	"I Got You Babe"	Moore; Kenny Lattimore; Haggins; Barias; Frank Romano	Carvin & Ivan	3:23
5.	"No Ordinary Love"	Sade Adu; Stuart Matthewman	Eastmond	5:29
6.	"Figure It Out"	Moore; Adonis Shropshire; Bryan-Michael Cox; Gregory Curtis, Sr.; Gregory Curtis, Jr.; Kendrick Dean; Troy Clark	Cox; WyldCard	3:10
7.	"Live With You"	Moore; Lattimore; Haggins; Moore; Romano; Barias	Carvin & Ivan	5:16
8.	"Here On Earth" (solo performance by Kenny Lattimore)	Eddie Cole	Cole; Lattimore	5:07
9.	"Just a Dream" (solo performance by Chanté Moore)	Kip Collins; Lamont Fleming; D. Williams	Fleming; Collins	4:00
10.	"Tonight (2 Step)"	Fleming	Fleming; Larry "Rock" Campbell	4:20
11.	"Everytime You Go"	Haggins; Barias; James "Jay Shawn" Smith; Johnnie Smith	Carvin & Ivan; Jay Shawn	4:25
12.	"Beautiful Distraction"	Eric Roberson; Mark Hamilton; Nicole Hamilton; Peter Winstead, Jr.	M. Hamilton; N. Hamilton	3:30
13.	"Vocal Booth"	Fleming; Shea Taylor	Fleming; Taylor	3:01

Disc 2: Covered

All tracks produced by Fred Hammond, except where noted.

No.	Title	Writer(s)	Producer(s)	Length
1.	"To Me, You're Everything"	Moore; Lattimore; Hammond; Aaron Delossantos		3:49
2.	"Rejoice (Clap Your Hands)"	Moore; Lattimore; Hammond		4:33
3.	"Make Me Like the Moon"	Moore; Lattimore; Hammond; Kermit Wells		4:59
4.	"Your Name"	Moore; Lattimore; Hammond; Bobby Sparks		4:43
5.	"I Give You My Praise" (solo performance by Moore)	Moore; Hammond; Delossantos; Charles Laster		4:47
6.	"I Do Love You" (solo performance by Kenny Lattimore)	Lattimore; Hammond; Delossantos		5:09
7.	"Mine All Mine" (duet performance by Chanté Moore featuring Joann Rosario)	Moore; Hammond; Sparks; Rosario		3:39
8.	"No Limit"	Moore; Lattimore; Hammond; Sparks		5:06
9.	"Never Alone" (solo performance by Chanté Moore)	Moore; Hammond		3:19
10.	"I Just Love to Praise You" (solo performance by Kenny Lattimore)	Lattimore; McCoy	McCoy	4:00
11.	"No Limit" (Remix)	Moore; Lattimore; Hammond; Sparks		5:59

Notes

- ^{^[a]} signifies a co-producer

== Charts ==
=== Weekly charts ===
Chart (2006)	Peak position
US Billboard 200	95
US Top R&B/Hip-Hop Albums (Billboard)	10
US Top Gospel Albums (Billboard)	2

=== Year-end charts ===
Chart (2006)	Peak position
US Top Gospel Albums (Billboard)	41
