= Kenny Lattimore =

American singer (born 1970)

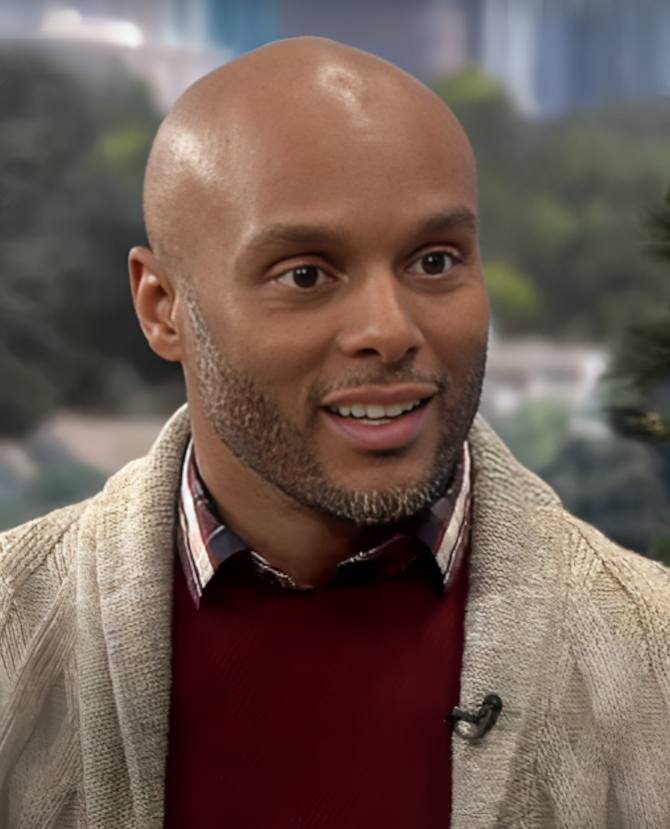
- Lattimore in 2017
- Born: Kenneth Lee Lattimore; April 10, 1970 (age 56); Washington, D.C., US
- Occupations: Singer; songwriter
- Years active: 1988–present
- Spouses: Chanté Moore (m. 2002; div. 2011) Faith Jenkins (m. 2020)
- Children: 3
- Musical career
- Genres: R&B; soul; gospel; jazz
- Labels: SincereSoul; Verve; LaFace; Arista; Columbia; Epic
- Website: kennylattimore.com

Kenneth Lee Lattimore (born April 10, 1970) is an American singer and songwriter. He is known for his smooth, soulful voice and romantic ballads. He rose to prominence in the mid-1990s with the release of his self-titled album, Kenny Lattimore. In 2024, Lattimore was inducted into the Rhythm and Blues Music Hall of Fame.

== Early life and education ==
Kenny Lattimore was born in Washington, D.C., United States. He developed an interest in music at a young age, singing in school and church choirs, band program at Eleanor Roosevelt High School in Greenbelt, Maryland. He often acknowledges Dr. Barbara Baker for setting him on his current path. Lattimore spoke at the 2005 Eleanor Roosevelt High School Graduation. He is an alumnus of Howard University in Washington, D.C.

== Career ==
=== 1988–1991: Maniquin ===
After working as a session vocalist for the R&B group Maniquin, Lattimore eventually became the group's lead singer. D'Extra Wiley, known for being part of the 1990s R&B group II D Extreme, was also briefly a member of Maniquin before signing with MCA Records. In 1989, Maniquin released their only self-titled album under Epic Records. The album's lead single, "I Wanna Ride," served as a response to Pebbles' hit song "Mercedes Boy" in both style and lyrics, with both tracks produced and co-written by Charlie Wilson of The Gap Band. Lattimore later left the group to pursue a solo career, leading to Maniquin's disbandment.

=== 1994–1999: Kenny Lattimore and From the Soul of Man ===
Lattimore signed with Columbia Records in late 1994 and released his debut album Kenny Lattimore in 1996. That set included a pair of Top 20 hits: "Never Too Busy" and the Grammy-nominated "For You", written by high school friend Kenny Lerum. The album earned Lattimore a win for Best New Artist at the NAACP Image Awards in 1996, and eventually achieved Gold sales status.

He followed up his debut with From the Soul of Man, another critically acclaimed set of classically styled soul music in 1998, yielding the hits "Days Like This" and "If I Lose My Woman" along with a standout cover of The Beatles' "While My Guitar Gently Weeps".

=== 2000–2006: Arista Records and Weekend ===
After a short hiatus, the singer re-emerged on Arista Records when then-president Clive Davis signed him to a new contract. He eventually released a more contemporary R&B album, 2001's Weekend under L.A. Reid's regime, as Davis was only allowed to take a small defined number of artists to his next venture, J Records. The title track and first single was anchored by a sample of Blondie's "Rapture" and became a radio favorite on both sides of the Atlantic. Davis may have had a different vision for his career, but he ended up recording three albums for Arista Records as Reid also had a vision that included a modern-day version of a classic soul duo with his new bride, the Gold-level artist Chante Moore whom he recorded two duet albums that were both critically and commercially acclaimed. In keeping with the "lover man" image that came to the fore with the hits that launched his career, Lattimore is known for his dramatic stage shows, vocal agility and romantic ambiance. The New York Times called him a "modern soul man" on stage. The singer has long established in interviews his personal mission to show the "strong, but sensitive and caring side of Black men."

In 2003, Lattimore and his then-wife Chante Moore released a duet album titled Things That Lovers Do consist of classic soul songs from the 1970s and 1980s plus two new original songs. The standout singles were the smooth and contemporary "Loveable (From Your Head to Your Toes)" and a cover of René & Angela's "You Don't Have To Cry". Lattimore and Moore continued promoting the album with a successful touring stage show.

Following Things That Lovers Do, Lattimore released another collaborative album with Moore. The duo released their second collaborative album titled Uncovered/Covered (2006). The album peaked at number ten on the Billboard R&B Charts and number two on the Billboard Gospel Charts. The duo's cover version of "You're All I Need to Get By" served as the theme song for the BET reality series The Family Crews.

=== 2008–present: Recent activities ===
Lattimore released a cover album with Verve Records titled Timeless on September 9, 2008. The lead single "You Are My Starship" was originally performed by Norman Connor featuring Michael Henderson. Lattimore was also featured on the uptempo dance song "Another Love" by Brian Culbertson.

Lattimore started his own record company SincereSoul Records in 2012. He released his album Back 2 Cool on January 22, 2013. The album's first single "Find a Way" (produced by Ivan "Orthodox" Barias & Carvin "Ransum" Higgins) hit radio on Valentine's Day 2012. The second single "Back 2 Cool" featured Kelly Price.

== Personal life ==
In January 2002, Lattimore married singer Chanté Moore in Jamaica. On April 10, 2003, Moore gave birth to their son Kenny Lattimore Jr. In July 2011, it was announced that the two had divorced.

On March 8, 2020, Lattimore married American judge Faith Jenkins. In late 2022, it was announced they were expecting their first child together. The pair welcomed a daughter in January 2023. In May 2026, the pair welcomed a boy, their second child together and Lattimore's third.

== Discography ==
Studio albums

- Kenny Lattimore (1996)
- From the Soul of Man (1998)
- Weekend (2001)
- Timeless (2008)
- Anatomy of a Love Song (2015)
- A Kenny Lattimore Christmas (2016)
- Vulnerable (2017)
- Here to Stay (2021)
- Lullabies for You (2026)

Collaborative albums

- Things That Lovers Do (with Chanté Moore) (2003)
- Uncovered/Covered (with Chante Moore) (2006)
