= Chanté Moore discography =

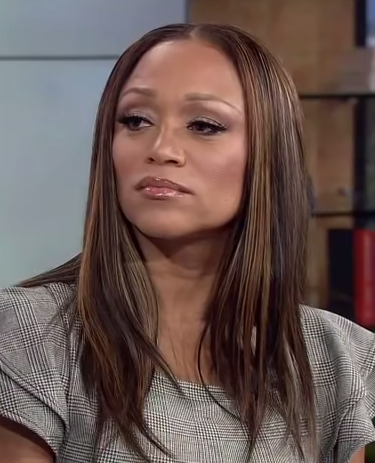
- Moore on Sister Circle TV in 2018.
- Studio albums: 8
- EPs: 1
- Compilation albums: 1
- Collaborative albums: 2

The discography of American R&B and jazz singer Chanté Moore consists of six studio albums, two collaborative albums, twenty-three singles, twenty collaborations and eleven music videos. Moore has had four record deals with MCA Records, Arista Records/LaFace Records, Peak Records and Shanachie Records, before founding CM7 Records.

She released her debut album Precious on September 29, 1992, through Silas Records and MCA Records. The album peaked at number 101 on the US Billboard 200 and number 20 on the US Top R&B/Hip-Hop Albums and was certified gold by the Recording Industry Association of America (RIAA) on November 14, 1994. Her debut single "Love's Taken Over" (1992) peaked at number 86 on US Billboard Hot 100, number 13 on the US Hot R&B/Hip-Hop Songs chart in the United States and number 54 on the UK Singles Chart in the United Kingdom. Her second single "It's Alright" (1993) peaked at number 13 on the US Hot R&B/Hip-Hop Songs chart, while Precious's third single "Who Do I Turn To?" peaked at number 83 on the Hot R&B/Hip-Hop Songs chart.

Moore released her second studio album with Silas and MCA, A Love Supreme, on November 15, 1994. It peaked at number 64 on the Billboard 200 and number 11 on the Top R&B/Hip-Hop Albums chart, Lead single "Old School Lovin'" (1994) reached the top 20 on the Hot R&B/Hip-Hop Songs chart, charting at number 19. while second single "This Time" (1994) charted at number 5 on the US Dance Club Songs chart. Third single "Free"/"Sail On" (1995), a blend of the Deniece Williams song and the Commodores single, charted at number 11 on the US Dance Club Songs chart. This Moment Is Mine was released as Moore's third studio album on May 25, 1999, being her first album in over four years. The album peaked at number 31 on the Billboard 200 and number 7 on the Top R&B/Hip-Hop Albums chart, marking her highes-charting album yet. The lead single "Chante's Got a Man" (1999) became her first top 10 single on the US Billboard Hot 100, charting at number 10 and number 2 on the Hot R&B/Hip-Hop Songs chart. "I See You in a Different Light" (1999) with singer Joel "Jo-Jo" Hailey from American R&B duo K-Ci & JoJo, was released as the album's second and final single. The song charted at number 61 on the Hot R&B/Hip-Hop Songs chart.

The singer released her fourth studio album, Exposed, on November 14, 2000. The album peaked at number 50 on the Billboard 200 and number 10 on the Top R&B/Hip-Hop Albums chart. It was preceded by lead single "Straight Up" which reached number 22 on the Hot R&B/Hip-Hop Songs chart in the United States and number 11 on the UK Singles Chart. Second single "Bitter" charted at number 55 on the Hot R&B/Hip-Hop Songs chart, though third single "Take Care of Me" failed to chart. In February 2003, Moore released her first collaborative album Things That Lovers Do was released with her then-husband and fellow R&B singer Kenny Lattimore, through Arista Records. The album peaked at number 31 on the Billboard 200 and number 3 on the Top R&B/Hip-Hop Albums chart. Two singles were released from the album, including "Loveable (From Your Head to Your Toes)" and "You Don't Have to Cry" which peaked at number 19 and 30 on the Adult R&B Songs chart respectively. A second collaborative album from Moore and Lattimore, Uncovered/Covered, was released through LaFace Records and Verity Records. It peaked at number 95 on the Billboard 200, number 10 on the Top R&B/Hip-Hop Albums chart and number 2 on the Top Gospel Albums chart. Three singles were released from the album, including "Tonight (2-Step)" and "Figure It Out", both of which peaked within the US Adult R&B top 40.

Love the Woman, Moore's fifth studio album, was released in June 2008 through Peak Records. The album peaked at number 14 on the Top R&B/Hip-Hop Albums chart. Lead single "It Ain't Supposed to Be This Way" (2008) peaked at number 21 on the US Adult R&B Songs chart. In July 2013, Shanachie Records released her sixth album Moore is More. The album peaked at number 14 on the Top R&B/Hip-Hop Albums chart and number 32 on the Independent Albums chart. Two singles were released from the album "Talking in My Sleep" and "Jesus, I Want You", both of which failed to chart. In 2017, Moore released her seventh studio album The Rise of the Phoenix through her own label CM7 Records. It peaked at number 46 on the R&B/Hip-Hop Albums Sales chart, while lead single "Real One" peaked at number 10 on the US Adult R&B Songs chart and number 39 on the US R&B/Hip-Hop Airplay chart; making "Real One" Moore's highest appearance on both charts since "Bitter" (2000). The album's second single, "Something to Remember" became Moore's 17th top 40 appearance on the Adult R&B chart, peaking at number 27. Later that year, Moore released her eighth studio album and holiday debut, Christmas Back to You. The album's release was preceded by the single "Cover Me in Snow". In 2018, Moore released the single "One Love" from the EP 1 of 4. Released on April 5, 1 of 4 is the first of four EPs to be released in 2018.

== Albums ==
=== Studio albums ===
List of studio albums, with selected chart positions, sales figures and certifications
Title	Album details	Peak chart positions						Certifications
Title	Album details	US	US R&B /HH	US Indie	FRA	UK	UK R&B	Certifications
Precious	Released: September 29, 1992; Labels: Silas, MCA; Formats: CD	101	20	—	—	—	—	RIAA: Gold
A Love Supreme	Released: November 15, 1994; Labels: Silas, MCA; Formats: CD, digital download	64	11	—	—	144	20	
This Moment Is Mine	Released: May 25, 1999; Labels: Silas, MCA; Formats: CD, digital download	31	7	—	—	—	—	
Exposed	Released: November 14, 2000; Labels: Silas, MCA; Formats: CD, digital download	50	10	—	130	186	28	
Love the Woman	Released: June 17, 2008; Labels: Peak, Concord; Formats: CD, digital download	110	14	—	—	—	—	
Moore Is More	Released: July 30, 2013; Label: Shanachie; Formats: CD, digital download	184	27	32	—	—	—	
The Rise of the Phoenix	Released: September 29, 2017; Label: CM7; Formats: CD, digital download	—	— (Note: The Rise of the Phoenix did not enter the Billboard R&B/Hip-Hop Albums chart, but peaked at number 46 on the R&B/Hip-Hop Album Sales chart.)	—	—	—	—	
Christmas Back to You	Released: November 3, 2017; Label: CM7; Formats: CD, digital download	—	—	—	—	—	—	

=== Collaborative albums ===
List of collaborative albums, with selected chart positions, sales, and certifications
Title	Album details	Peak chart positions		
Title	Album details	US	US R&B /HH	US Gospel
Things That Lovers Do (with Kenny Lattimore)	Released: February 11, 2003; Label: Arista; Formats: CD, digital download	31	3	—
Uncovered/Covered (with Kenny Lattimore)	Released: October 10, 2006; Labels: LaFace, Verity; Formats: CD, digital download	95	10	2
A Toxic Love (with Queen Sheba and Lil' Ronnie)	Released: August 19, 2026; Labels: Einnor; Formats: Digital download	—	—	—

=== Compilation albums ===
List of compilation albums, with selected chart positions, sales, and certifications
Title	Album details
Mood	Released: July 28, 2003; Label: MCA; Formats: CD, digital download
20th Century Masters – The Millennium Collection: The Best of Chanté Moore	Released: May 18, 2004; Label: Geffen; Formats: CD, digital download

== EPs ==
List of extended plays
Title	EP details
1 of 4	Released: April 5, 2018; Label: CM7; Format: Digital download

== Singles ==
=== As lead artist ===
List of singles as lead artist, with selected chart positions and certifications, showing year released and album name
Title	Year	Peak chart positions										Certifications	Album
Title	Year	US	US R&B /HH	US R&B /HH Airplay	US Adult R&B	US Dance	BEL	FRA	NLD	SWI	UK	Certifications	Album
"Love's Taken Over"	1992	86	13	7	—	—	—	—	—	—	54		Precious
"It's Alright"	1993	— (Note: "It's Alright" did not enter the Billboard Hot 100, but peaked at number 8 on the Bubbling Under Hot 100 Singles chart.)	13	12	—	—	—	—	—	—	—		Precious
"Who Do I Turn To?"	1993	—	83	72	—	—	—	—	—	—	—		Precious
"As If We Never Met"	1993	—	— (Note: "As If We Never Met" did not enter the Billboard Hot R&B/Hip-Hop Songs, but peaked at number 7 on the US Bubbling Under R&B/Hip-Hop Songs chart.)	—	—	—	—	—	—	—	—		Precious
"Old School Lovin'"	1994	—	19	18	13	—	—	—	—	—	—		A Love Supreme
"This Time"	1994	—	61	74	—	5	—	—	—	—	—		A Love Supreme
"I'm What You Need"	1995	—	56	62	14	—	—	—	—	—	—		A Love Supreme
"Free"/"Sail On"	1995	—	—	—	—	11	—	—	—	—	69		A Love Supreme
"Chanté's Got a Man"	1999	10	2	2	2	34	—	—	—	—	—	RIAA: Gold	This Moment Is Mine
"I See You in a Different Light" (featuring JoJo Hailey)	1999	—	61	60	25	—	—	—	—	—	—		This Moment Is Mine
"Straight Up"	2000	83	22	22	27	—	12	22	37	66	11		Exposed
"Bitter"	2000	—	55	49	10	—	—	—	—	—	—		Exposed
"Take Care of Me" (featuring Da Brat)	2001	—	—	—	—	—	—	—	—	—	—		Exposed
"Loveable (From Your Head to Your Toes)"	2002	—	— (Note: "Loveable (From Your Head to Your Toes)" did not enter the Billboard Hot R&B/Hip-Hop Songs, but peaked at number 11 on the US Bubbling Under R&B/Hip-Hop Songs chart.)	—	19	—	—	—	—	—	—		Things That Lovers Do
"You Don't Have to Cry"	2003	—	—	—	30	—	—	—	—	—	—		Things That Lovers Do
"Tonight (2 Step)"	2005	—	—	—	39	—	—	—	—	—	—		Uncovered/Covered
"Figure It Out"	2006	—	— (Note: "Figure It Out" did not enter the Billboard Hot R&B/Hip-Hop Songs, but peaked at number 24 on the US Bubbling Under R&B/Hip-Hop Songs chart.)	—	37	—	—	—	—	—	—		Uncovered/Covered
"Make Me Like the Moon"	2006	—	—	—	—	—	—	—	—	—	—		Uncovered/Covered
"It Ain't Supposed to Be This Way"	2008	—	90	—	21	—	—	—	—	—	—		Love the Woman
"Talking in My Sleep"	2013	—	—	—	—	—	—	—	—	—	—		Moore Is More
"Jesus, I Want You"	2013	—	—	—	—	—	—	—	—	—	—		Moore Is More
"I Know, Right"	2014	—	—	—	—	—	—	—	—	—	—		Non-album single
"Real One"	2017	—	—	39	10	—	—	—	—	—	—		The Rise of the Phoenix
"Something to Remember"	2017	—	—	—	27	—	—	—	—	—	—		The Rise of the Phoenix
"Cover Me in Snow"	2017	—	—	—	—	—	—	—	—	—	—		Christmas Back to You
"One Love" (featuring Lewis Sky)	2018	—	—	—	—	—	—	—	—	—	—		1 of 4
"Every Day's Like Christmas"	2018	—	—	—	—	—	—	—	—	—	—		Christmas Back to You
"Fresh Love"	2019	—	—	—	—	—	—	—	—	—	—		Non-album singles
"Right One"	2021	—	—	—	—	—	—	—	—	—	—		Non-album singles
"So Distracted" (with Eric Benét)	2024	—	—	17	1	—	—	—	—	—	—		Duets and The Co-Star
"—" denotes releases that did not chart or were not released in that territory.

=== As featured artist ===
List of singles as featured artist, with selected chart positions, showing year released and album name
Title	Year	Peak chart positions						Album
Title	Year	US	US AC	US R&B /HH	US Adult R&B	AUS	NLD	Album
"You Know What I Like" (with El DeBarge)	1992	—	—	14	—	—	—	In the Storm
"Satisfy You" (with Damion Hall)	1994	—	—	48	30	—	—	Straight to the Point
"Your Home Is in My Heart" (with Boyz II Men)	1998	—	—	—	—	76	90	How Stella Got Her Groove Back
"When You Need Me" (with Will Downing)	2000	—	—	— (Note: "When You Need Me" did not enter the Billboard Hot R&B/Hip-Hop Songs, but peaked at number 7 on the US Bubbling Under R&B/Hip-Hop Songs chart.)	18	—	—	All the Man You Need
"Contagious" (with The Isley Brothers and R. Kelly)	2001	19	—	3	—	—	—	Eternal
"One More Time" (with Kenny G)	2002	—	19	—	27	—	—	Paradise
"—" denotes releases that did not chart or were not released in that territory.

== Other charted songs ==
List of singles as featured artist, with selected chart positions, showing year released and album name
Title	Year	Peak chart positions	Album
Title	Year	US Jazz	Album
"Where Is the Love?" (Phill Perry featuring Chanté Moore)	2014	12	Say Yes

== Album appearances ==
Title	Year	Artist	Album
"Listen to the Message"^{[a]}	1988	Club Nouveau	Listen to the Message
"Lock-N-Key"^{[a]}	1989	Mikki Bleu	I Promise
"Something Real"^{[a]}	1989	Mikki Bleu	I Promise
"Knocks Me Off My Feet"^{[a]}	1989	Mikki Bleu	I Promise
"Stand"^{[a]}	1989	Mikki Bleu	I Promise
"What's Nest?"^{[a]}	1991	Dee Harvey	Just As I Am
"I Don't Know Yet"^{[a]}	1991	Dee Harvey	Just As I Am
"Elmo Funk (Prelude)^{[a]}	1992	El DeBarge	In the Storm
"My Heart Belongs To You"^{[a]}	1992	El DeBarge	In the Storm
"Love Me Tonight"^{[a]}	1992	El DeBarge	In the Storm
"You Know What I Like"^{[a]}	1992	El DeBarge	In the Storm
"In The Storm"^{[a]}	1992	El DeBarge	In the Storm
"Thick"^{[a]}	1992	El DeBarge	In the Storm
"When I Think Of You"^{[a]}	1992	Everette Harp	Everette Harp
"Good Enough"^{[a]}	1992	Bobby Brown	Bobby
"Fame"^{[a]}	1992	George Duke	Snapshots
"Geneva"^{[a]}	1992	George Duke	Snapshots
"Between The Sheets"^{[a]}	1993	Fourplay (featuring Chaka Khan & Nathan East)	Between The Sheets
"Satisfy You"	1992	Damion "Crazy Legs" Hall (with Chanté Moore)	Straight to the Point
"Satisfy You (Remix)"	1992	Damion "Crazy Legs" Hall (with Chanté Moore)	Straight to the Point
"My Heart, Your Heart"^{[a]}	1992	Patrice Rushen	Anything But Ordinary
"Illusion"^{[a]}	1995	George Duke	Illusions
"Heal Our Land"^{[a]}	1996	Jonathan Butler	Celebrating The New South Africa, Place of Hope, Two Worlds Become One
"You're Makin Me High"^{[a]}	1996	Toni Braxton	Secrets
"Find Me A Man"^{[a]}	1996	Toni Braxton	Secrets
"Why Should I Care"^{[a]}	1996	Toni Braxton	Secrets
"La, La, La Means Eye Love You"^{[a]}	1996	The Artist (Formerly Known As Prince)	Emancipation
"I Love You"	1998	Keith Washington (duet with Chanté Moore)	KW
"Cruisin'"^{[a]}	1998	Nils	Blue Planet
"Journey 2 The Center Of Your Heart"^{[a]}	1998	Chaka Khan	Come 2 My House
"Can We Do That?"	1999	Gerald McCauley	The McCauley Sessions
"Down on My Knees"	1999	Chanté Moore	Summer Heat Nineteen Ninety Nine – Volume One
"Christmas Morn"	1999	Chanté Moore	My Christmas Album
"When You Need Me"	2000	Will Downing (featuring Chanté Moore)	All The Man You Need
"Save Some Love For Me"^{[a]}	2000	Fourplay	...Yes, Please!
"She's Amazing"	2000	George Duke	Cool
"Contagious"^{[a]}	2001	The Isley Brothers (featuring R. Kelly and Chanté Moore)	Eternal
"Girls, Girls, Girls (Part 2)"^{[a]}	2001	Jay-Z	The Blueprint
"This Time Next Year"^{[a]}	2001	Toni Braxton	Snowflakes
"We Are Family"	2001	We Are Family Collective	We Are Family (Single)
"Feeling The Way"	2002	Norman Brown	Just Chillin'
"One More Time"	2002	Kenny G (featuring Chanté Moore)	Paradise
"Wanderer's Song"	2003	Chanté Moore	Yourself... Myself
"Til You Come Back To Me"	2005	The Rippingtons featuring Russ Freeman (featuring Chanté Moore)	Wild Card
"The Windows of the World"	2006	Dionne Warwick (with Angie Stone, Chanté Moore, Deborah Cox and Da Brat)	My Friends & Me
"Santa Baby"	2007	Boney James (featuring Chanté Moore)	Christmas Present
"Atmosphere Of Faith"	2010	Kevin LeVar & One Sound (featuring Chanté Moore)	Let's Come Together
"Where Is The Love"	2013	Phil Perry (duet with Chanté Moore)	Say Yes
"Change"	2015	Young Twaun (featuring Chanté Moore)	Change (Single)
"Best of the Best"	2015	Terri Lyne Carrington (featuring Chanté Moore)	The Mosaic Project: Love And Soul
"Holding You"	2017	Norman Brown (featuring Chanté Moore)	Let It Go
"Higher"	2017	Simon Law (featuring Chanté Moore)	Look to the Sky

Notes

- ^{^[a]} signifies background/additional vocals

== Soundtrack appearances ==
Title	Year	Artist	Album
"Candlelight & You (House Party II Love Theme)"	1991	Keith Washington (featuring Chanté Moore)	House Party II
"Mood"	1994	Chanté Moore	Beverly Hills Cop III
"Inside My Love"	1995	Chanté Moore	New York Undercover
"It Hurts Like Hell" ^{^[a]}	1995	Aretha Franklin	Waiting to Exhale
"And I Give My Love To You" ^{^[a]}	1995	Sonja Marie	Waiting to Exhale
"Wey U"	1995	Chanté Moore	Waiting to Exhale
"My Love, Sweet Love" ^{^[a]}	1995	Patti LaBelle	Waiting to Exhale
"Count On Me" ^{^[a]}	1995	Whitney Houston & CeCe Winans	Waiting to Exhale
"Your Home Is in My Heart (Stella's Love Theme)"	1998	Boyz II Men & Chanté Moore	How Stella Got Her Groove Back
"I See You in a Different Light"	1999	Chanté Moore (featuring JoJo Hailey)	For The Love of the Game
"Wall Around My Heart"	1999	The Emeralds (featuring Chanté Moore)	Shake, Rattle & Roll
"This Is A Test"	2000	Chanté Moore	Romeo Must Die
"Treated Like Her"	2000	LaTocha Scott & Chanté Moore	Big Momma's House
"Go Ahead With All That"	2001	Chanté Moore	Two Can Play That Game
"Lost Without You"	2005	Chanté Moore	The Seat Filler
"I'm A Diva"	2013	Lil' Mo & Chanté Moore	R&B Divas: Los Angeles

Notes

- ^{^[a]} signifies background/additional vocals

== Music videos ==
=== As lead artist ===
Title	Year	Director(s)	Ref.
"Love's Taken Over"	1992	Antoine Fuqua	
"It's Alright"	1992	Antoine Fuqua	
"Old School Lovin'"	1994	Matthew Rolston	
"This Time"	1995	Randee St. Nicholas	
"Chanté's Got a Man"	1999	Darren Grant, Prentice Sinclair Smith	
"I See You in a Different Light" (featuring JoJo Hailey)	1999	Steve Willis	
"Straight Up" (featuring Jermaine Dupri)	2000	Bille Woodruff	
"Bitter"	2000	Aaron Courseault	
"You Don't Have to Cry" (with Kenny Lattimore)	2003	—	
"Real One"	2017	Greg "G. Visuals" Williams	
"Something to Remember"	2017	Frank Gatson, Jr.	
"Cover Me in Snow"	2017	Greg "G. Visuals" Williams	
"Fresh Love"	2019	Michael Vaughn	
"Right One"	2021	Meiko Taylor	
"So Distracted"	2025	Michael Rainin	

=== As featured artist ===
Title	Year	Artist(s)	Director(s)	Ref.
"You Know What I Like"	1992	El DeBarge (featuring Chanté Moore)	Stéphane Sednaoui	
"Fame"	1992	George Duke	—	—
"Satisfy You"	1994	Damion Hall (featuring Chanté Moore)	Jesse Vaughn	
"Contagious"	2001	The Isley Brothers (featuring R. Kelly & Chanté Moore)	R. Kelly & Bille Woodruff	
