= This Moment Is Mine =

Studio album by Chanté Moore
- Released: May 25, 1999
- Length: 59:49
- Labels: Silas; MCA
- Producers: Keith Crouch; Jermaine Dupri; Rodney Jerkins; Jimmy Jam & Terry Lewis; Simon Law; Chanté Moore; Guy Roche; Robin Thicke

Chanté Moore chronology
A Love Supreme (1994)	This Moment Is Mine (1999)	Exposed (2000)

Singles from This Moment is Mine
- 1. "Chanté's Got a Man" Released: May 4, 1999; 2. "I See You in a Different Light" Released: September 14, 1999

This Moment Is Mine is the third album by American singer Chanté Moore. It was released on May 25, 1999, through Silas Records and MCA Records, marking her first album release in four and a half years following A Love Supreme. Developed after a period of personal and professional transition, the album saw Moore take a more active role in its creation as executive producer and co-writer of ten tracks. It features production from Jimmy Jam & Terry Lewis, Rodney Jerkins, Simon Law, Robin Thicke, Guy Roche, and Jermaine Dupri, among others, and expanded on Moore's contemporary R&B sound.

The album received generally positive reviews from critics, who praised Moore's understated vocal performance and the album's polished production. Commercially, it also achieved her strongest commercial success to that point, peaking at number 31 on the US Billboard 200 and becoming her first top-ten album on the Top R&B/Hip-Hop Albums chart. Led by "Chanté's Got a Man," which became Moore's first crossover hit and reached the top ten on the US Billboard Hot 100, the album spawned two singles, while follow-up "I See You in a Different Light" achieved more modest chart success.

== Background ==
Moore's first two albums, Precious (1992) and A Love Supreme (1994), both released through Silas Records, established her as a promising artist. While Precious achieved gold certification in the United States and she scored three top 20 R&B hits between 1992 and 1994, including "Love's Taken Over," "It's Alright," and "Old School Lovin'," Moore had yet to achieve a major crossover breakthrough on the mainstream pop charts. In September 1996, she stepped away from her recording career to focus on her personal life, welcoming a daughter, Sophia Milan Hardison, with actor Kadeem Hardison; the couple later married privately in 1997. Although Moore soon returned to the studio to begin work on her third album, a series of personnel changes at MCA Records, the parent company of Silas Records, disrupted the project's early stages. Moore later described the prolonged recording process as "arduous."

Despite the challenges surrounding the album's development, Moore later viewed the extended process as an opportunity to find the right creative collaborators for the project. The additional time allowed her to work with a range of established producers and songwriters, whom she considered essential in shaping the sound and direction of This Moment Is Mine, particularly Jimmy Jam & Terry Lewis, who contributed much of the album's material. Moore served as executive producer on the album along with Louil Silas Jr. and co-wrote ten of the album's tracks. She described This Moment Is Mine as a more expansive representation of her artistry, reflecting a desire to move beyond the jazz-influenced R&B style associated with her earlier work and explore a broader range of contemporary R&B sounds. For Moore, the album also reflected her personal and professional transitions during the late 1990s. Its themes were influenced by her experiences as a new mother and her increased involvement in the creative and business aspects of her career.

== Promotion ==
"Chanté's Got a Man," co-written and produced by Jimmy Jam & Terry Lewis, was released commercially as the album's lead single on May 4, 1999, and marked Moore's first major crossover success. Featuring an interpolation of the 1971 Osmonds song "One Bad Apple," the song became her first top 10 hit on the US Billboard Hot 100, peaking at number 10, while also reaching number two on the Hot R&B/Hip-Hop Songs chart. It remains Moore's only solo single to receive a Gold certification from the Recording Industry Association of America (RIAA), recognizing sales of 500,000 units. The song earned nominations for Best R&B/Soul Single – Female at the 2000 Soul Train Music Awards and Outstanding Song at the NAACP Image Awards. "Chanté's Got a Man" also received a Best R&B/Soul Single, Solo nomination at the 1999 Soul Train Lady of Soul Awards.

Diane Warren-penned "I See You in a Different Light," a duet with JoJo Hailey from duo K-Ci & JoJo, was released as the second single from the album on September 14, 1999. The song did not match the crossover success of "Chanté's Got a Man," peaking at number sixty-one on the Hot R&B/Hip-Hop Songs chart, while failing to reach the pop chart. Originally planned as the follow-up single to "Chanté's Got a Man," Rodney "Darkchild" Jerkins-produced "If I Gave Love" was ultimately shelved after Jerkins reworked a similar composition for Jennifer Lopez's debut single "If You Had My Love." The song was rewritten at the request of Sean Combs, who was involved in the production of Lopez's album On the 6 (1999), resulting in a new version with the same arrangement but different lyrics and title. Moore later expressed disappointment over the decision not to release "If I Gave Love," particularly after "I See You in a Different Light" achieved more modest commercial results.

== Critical reception ==
Professional ratings
Review scores
Source	Rating
AllMusic	4/5 stars
Entertainment Weekly	B

This Moment Is Mine received generally positive reviews from music critics, who praised Moore's vocal restraint, emotional delivery, and the album's contemporary R&B production. Stephen Thomas Erlewine from AllMusic wrote that the album found Moore "at the top of her game," describing it as "an alluring contemporary soul album that manages to avoid most of the cliches of the genre." He praised her understated vocal approach, noting that Moore "never shouts or engages in histrionic caterwauls," instead delivering each line with emotional conviction. Erlewine concluded that the album was "a first-rate urban soul album," while acknowledging that it contained some filler material. In his review for Vibe, editor Marc Weingarlen similarly praised Moore's subtle performance style, writing that "instead of performing melodramatic calisthenics, Moore lets her throaty, understated phrasing glide over the album's gentle groove." He highlighted her preference for restraint over vocal excess, stating that "this songbird prefers subtlety to brashness."

In another positive review, Geoffrey Himes from The Washington Post praised Moore's collaboration with several high-profile producers and songwriters, including Jimmy Jam & Terry Lewis, Rodney Jerkins, Jermaine Dupri, and Diane Warren, stating that "the investment paid off" and calling This Moment Is Mine "her best [album] by far." He highlighted Moore's "girl-next-door personality that's at once disarming and alluring" and praised her performance on the lead single "Chanté's Got a Man," noting that her "personal investment comes through in the performance." Reviewing This Moment Is Mine for Ebony, Lynn Norment wrote that Moore "still has one of the prettiest voices in the music business," noting that the album reflected "personal feelings and experiences" across its eleven tracks. She cited "I Cry to Myself," "In My Life," "Easy," and the title track as highlights, praising Moore for "serenad[ing] listeners with flowing tempos and beautiful vocals." Cheo Tyehimba of Entertainment Weekly, who awarded the album a B rating, wrote that most of the songs successfully blended Moore's "feathery vocal caress" with themes of "old-school lovin'." Although he found the album "not collectively transcendent," he praised its intimate tone, describing it as "a butterscotch candy shared between lovers."

== Commercial performance ==
This Moment Is Mine debuted and peaked at number 31 on the US Billboard 200 in the week of June 12, 1999 selling 40,000 copies in the first week. This marked Moore's highest peak yet. The album also reached number seven on the US Top R&B/Hip-Hop Albums chart, becoming her first top ten entry on the chart and had sold 275,000 copies by 2001. Billboard ranked it 89th on the chart's 1999 year-end listing.

== Track listing ==
This Moment Is Mine track listing
No.	Title	Writer(s)	Producer(s)	Length
1.	"If I Gave Love"	Eric Dawkins; LaShawn Daniels; Rodney Jerkins	Jerkins	5:47
2.	"Girls Will Talk" (Interlude)			0:36
3.	"Chanté's Got a Man"	Chanté Moore; James Harris III; Terry Lewis; George Jackson	Jimmy Jam & Terry Lewis	4:25
4.	"I See You in a Different Light" (featuring JoJo Hailey)	Diane Warren	Guy Roche; Warren^{[a]}	4:23
5.	"Easy"	Moore; James Wright; Harris; Lewis	Jimmy Jam & Terry Lewis; Wright^{[b]}	5:40
6.	"I Cry to Myself"	Moore; Wright; Harris; Lewis	Jimmy Jam & Terry Lewis; Wright^{[b]}	5:24
7.	"Blooming Flower"	Moore; Simon Law	Moore; Law	5:01
8.	"Heartbeat"	Moore; Jermaine Dupri; Manuel Seal	Dupri; Seal^{[b]}	3:29
9.	"I've Got the Love"	Moore; Chaka Khan; Ray Parker, Jr.	Jerkins; Moore^{[b]}	5:23
10.	"I Started Crying"	Moore; Harris; Lewis	Jimmy Jam & Terry Lewis	4:11
11.	"I Got a Secret to Tell Ya" (Interlude)			1:04
12.	"Love and the Woman"	Moore; Dorothea Joyce; Harris; Lewis	Jimmy Jam & Terry Lewis	4:56
13.	"In My Life"	Munk; Lascelles Stephens; Robin Thicke	Thicke	4:14
14.	"This Moment Is Mine"	Moore; Wright; Harris; Lewis	Jimmy Jam & Terry Lewis	5:13
Total length:				59:49

Japan bonus track
No.	Title	Writer(s)	Producer(s)	Length
15.	"Everyday"	Moore; Keith Crouch	Crouch	4:58
Total length:				63:47

Notes

- ^{^[a]} signifies an executive producer
- ^{^[b]} signifies a co-producer

Sample credits

- "Chanté's Got a Man" contains elements of "One Bad Apple," written by George Jackson.
- "Love and the Woman" contains elements of "Love's Lines, Angles and Rhymes," written by Dorothea Joyce.

== Personnel ==
Credits adapted from the liner notes of This Moment Is Mine.

Musicians

- Daria Adams – strings
- Dave Barry – guitar
- Taichi Chen – strings
- Helen Foli – strings
- Roger Frisch – strings
- John Glaser – keyboards
- JoJo Hailey – featured vocals, backing vocals
- Lee Hamblin – drum programming
- Sophia Milan Hardison – additional vocals
- James Harrah – guitar
- Laura Helgeson – strings
- Randy Jackson – bass
- Brion James – acoustic guitar
- Paul Johnson – bass
- Merike Klemp – strings
- Celine Leathead – strings
- Yuri Merzhevsky – strings
- Julia Persitz – strings
- Myrna Rian – strings
- Alex Richbourg – drum programming
- Mike Scott – guitar
- Elizabeth Sobieski – strings
- Samina Thatcher – strings
- Michael Thompson – guitar
- Stokley Williams – percussion
- Big Jim Wright – keyboards

Technical

- Chris Bair – production coordinator
- Tom Bender – assistant engineer
- Brad Gilderman – recording engineer, mixing engineer
- Steve Hodge – recording engineer, mixing engineer
- Mario Luccy – recording engineer, mixing engineer
- Bill Malina – mixing engineer
- Victor McCoy – assistant engineer
- Chanté Moore – executive producer
- Pro-Jay – recording engineer
- Louil Silas Jr. – executive producer
- Xavier Smith – assistant engineer
- Phil Tan – recording engineer, mixing engineer

== Charts ==
=== Weekly charts ===
Weekly chart performance for This Moment Is Mine
Chart (1999)	Peak position
US Billboard 200	31
US Top R&B/Hip-Hop Albums (Billboard)	7

=== Year-end charts ===
Year-end chart performance for This Moment Is Mine
Chart (1999)	Position
US Top R&B/Hip-Hop Albums (Billboard)	89

== Release history ==
Release dates and formats for This Moment Is Mine
Region	Date	Format(s)	Label	Ref.
Japan	May 22, 1999	CD; cassette	MCA	
United States	May 25, 1999	CD; cassette	Silas; MCA	
