= Love the Woman =

Studio album by Chanté Moore
- Released: June 17, 2008
- Length: 47:53
- Label: Peak
- Producers: Warryn Campbell; Eric Dawkins; Antonio Dixon; George Duke; Shelea Frazier; Jamey Jaz; Raphael Saadiq

Chanté Moore chronology
Uncovered/Covered (2006)	Love the Woman (2008)	Moore Is More (2013)

Singles from Love the Woman
- 1. "It Ain't Supposed to Be This Way" Released: May 12, 2008

Love the Woman is the fifth studio album by singer Chanté Moore. It was released by Peak Records on June 17, 2008, in the United States. Her debut with the label, it marked her first solo release since her 2000 album Exposed (2000), following the release of her collaborative albums Things That Lovers Do (2003) and Uncovered/Covered (2006) with husband Kenny Lattimore. Moore reunited with producer George Duke and consulted Raphael Saadiq and Warryn Campbell to work with her on Love the Woman with the result that it encompasses contemporary R&B, jazz, and pop.

The album received generally positive but mixed reviews, with critics praising Moore's mature, soulful vocals and the album's blend of contemporary R&B and jazz influences, while some found its pacing, production, and reliance on familiar material uneven. Commercially, it debuted and peaked at number 110 on the US Billboard 200 and number 14 on the Top R&B/Hip-Hop Albums chart, becoming Moore's lowest-charting album to date. Love the Woman spawned the single "It Ain't Supposed to Be This Way" which peaked at number 21 on Billboard's Adult R&B Songs chart.

== Background ==
In 2000, Moore released her fourth studio album, Exposed. Building on the crossover success of "Chanté's Got a Man," the top ten lead single from This Moment Is Mine (1999), her label, MCA Records, encouraged her to record "more R&B" and "more mainstream" material in an effort to broaden her commercial appeal. Although Moore later acknowledged that the album's musical direction was driven more by the label's vision than her own artistic instincts, she embraced the opportunity to experiment with new collaborators and described the recording process as an enjoyable experience. Despite becoming her second top ten album on the US Top R&B/Hip-Hop Albums chart and producing the internationally successful single "Straight Up," which reached the top 20 in Belgium and the United Kingdom, Exposed failed to match the commercial performance of its predecessor, leading to the end of Moore's recording contract with MCA.

After marrying fellow R&B singer Kenny Lattimore in 2002, Moore did not immediately pursue a new solo recording deal. Instead, music executive Michael Mauldin conceived the idea of pairing the couple on a duets album. They subsequently released two collaborative albums, the cover-heavy Things That Lovers Do and Uncovered/Covered, in 2003 and 2006, respectively, with the former becoming the highest-charting album of either artist's career. During this period, Moore also embraced a more private life following the birth of their son in 2003 while also expanding her artistic pursuits beyond music. She made her stage acting debut alongside Lattimore in the theatrical production Things That Lovers Do and later toured in By Any Means Necessary with Tisha Campbell-Martin and Dave Hollister.

== Production ==
For her next solo project, Moore envisioned a blend of contemporary R&B, jazz, and soul, working with a combination of established producers and emerging collaborator. Sessions reunited her with longtime musical mentor George Duke. Moore selected Duke as one of her first collaborators for the project, explaining that she specifically wanted to incorporate more traditional jazz elements into the album and felt his musicianship and creative understanding made him an ideal partner. She credited their renewed collaboration with allowing her to further develop her vocal approach, citing Duke's familiarity with her artistry as a key factor in creating an environment where she could experiment. Duke produced several tracks on the album, including Moore's rendition of Minnie Riperton's "Give Me Time." Additional production came from Raphael Saadiq, who produced the acoustic-driven track "Special," and Warryn Campbell, who handled production on the piano-led ballad "My Eyes." The title track was co-written by Moore and producer Jamey Jaz, while lead single "It Ain't Supposed to Be" was written and produced by Shelea Frazier.

Serving as executive producer, Moore took a more selective approach to the album's creation, relying on outside writers and producers rather than composing the majority of the material herself, as she had earlier in her career. She explained that the process allowed her to focus on finding songs that aligned with her artistic vision and interpreting material that connected with her personally. The album also incorporated jazz standards such as "Guess Who I Saw Today" and "This Could Be the Start of Something," reflecting the influence of Moore's childhood exposure to jazz through her father, a jazz pianist. During the album's promotional cycle, Moore described Love the Woman as one of her favorite projects, noting that "It Ain't Supposed to Be" was selected as the lead single because it represented the album's balance of R&B and jazz influences. She also characterized the album as a reflection of her personal journey, exploring themes of "real love," emotional growth, and resilience through the lessons learned from both joyful and difficult experiences. Moore further explained that, rather than being defined by a specific musical departure, Love the Woman reflected her personal growth and evolution over time, with the album capturing who she was and where she stood in her life at the point of recording.

== Critical reception ==
Professional ratings
Review scores
Source	Rating
AllMusic	2.5/5 stars
Artistdirect	2.5/5 stars
Philadelphia Daily News	B+

Love the Woman received generally positive but mixed reviews from critics, who praised Moore's vocal performance, maturity, and blend of R&B and jazz influences while noting occasional issues with the album's pacing and production. Gail Mitchell of Billboard praised the album as a strong solo return, highlighting Moore's soulful vocals and collaborations with Duke, Saadiq, and Campbell. She commended Moore's avoidance of contemporary R&B trends and praised tracks such as "It Ain’t Supposed to Be This Way" and her interpretations of "Give Me Time" and "Guess Who I Saw Today. Jonathan Takiff from Philadelphia Daily News similarly gave the album a B+, praising its themes of love and maturity while naming "Always Gonna Be Something" a highlight

Amy Sciarretto of Artistdirect described Love the Woman as a warm blend of contemporary R&B and neo-jazz, praising Moore's understated vocal style and the album’s sophisticated approach. Melody Charles of SoulTracks also praised Moore’s emotional sincerity and growth as an artist but felt that the album’s second half lacked the strength and variety of its opening tracks. BBC Music critic Angus Taylor called the album a relaxed and comfortable return rather than a major comeback, noting that it reflected Moore’s gradual re-entry into the R&B market while criticizing its mastering. AllMusic editor Andy Kellman viewed the album as a natural continuation of Exposed, praising its smooth production but criticizing the similarity of its slower tracks and the stylistic mismatch of "Can’t Do It." Matthew Milam of Blogcritics gave a more mixed review, arguing that while Moore’s vocals remained impressive, the album relied too heavily on familiar material. He praised the jazz-influenced tracks "Guess Who I Saw Today" and "Start of Something Big," suggesting that a stronger jazz focus could have better showcased her artistry

== Commercial performance ==
Released by Peak Records on June 17, 2008 in the United States, Love the Woman debuted and peaked at number 110 on the US Billboard 200 and number 14 on the Top R&B/Hip-Hop Albums. It became Moore's lowest-charting album to date, and by November 2008, had sold approximately 25,000 copies in the United States.

== Track listing ==
Love the Woman track listing
No.	Title	Writer(s)	Producer(s)	Length
1.	"Always Gonna Be Somethin'"	Tamara Savage; Warryn Campbell	W. Campbell	3:32
2.	"Can't Do It"	Dontae Winslow; Joi Campbell; W. Campbell	W. Campbell	3:13
3.	"Special"	Robert Ozuna; Kelvin Wooten; Raphael Saadiq	Saadiq	4:22
4.	"It Ain't Supposed to Be This Way"	Shelea Frazier	Frazier; Jan "ODubbG" Fairchild^{[a]}	3:43
5.	"My Eyes"	J. Campbell; W. Campbell	W. Campbell	3:56
6.	"Give Me Time"	Leonard Castro; Lila F. Hurtado	George Duke	5:03
7.	"Do for You"	Antonio Dixon; Eric Dawkins	Dixon; Dawkins	4:10
8.	"Love the Woman"	Moore; Jamey Jaz	Jaz	4:48
9.	"Love Action"	Moore; Jaz	Jaz	4:15
10.	"First Kiss"	Frazier	Frazier	2:47
11.	"Guess Who I Saw Today"	Elisse Boyd; Murray Grand	Duke	5:47

Circuit City bonus track
No.	Title	Writer(s)	Producer(s)	Length
12.	"This Could Be the Start of Something"	Steve Allen	Duke	2:17

Japan bonus track
No.	Title	Writer(s)	Producer(s)	Length
12.	"Love Fell on Me"	Frazier	Frazier	2:17

Notes

- ^{^a} denotes additional producer

== Personnel ==
Credits adapted from the liner notes of Love the Woman.

Musicians

- Curt Bisquera – drums
- Brian Bromberg – upright bass
- Katisse Buckingham – flute
- Warryn "Baby Dubb" Campbell – instrument programming
- Joi Campbell – backing vocals
- Lenny Castro – percussion
- Vinnie Colaiuta – drums
- Eric Dawkins – backing vocals
- Joey De Leon Jr. – percussion
- George Duke – harmonica, keyboards
- Jan "ODubbG" Fairchild – organ, drum programming
- Raul Ferrando – strings
- Shelea Frazier – backing vocals, piano
- Ray Fuller – guitar
- Reggie Hamilton – bass
- Jamey Jaz – all instruments
- Jubu – guitar
- Chanté Moore – lead vocals, backing vocals, vocals
- Robert Ozuna – drums, percussion
- Ramon Stagnaro – guitar
- Dontae Winslow – horns, horn arrangements

Technical

- Bruce Buechner – recording engineer, mixing engineer
- Chuck Brungardt – recording engineer, mixing engineer
- Sandra Campbell – project coordinator
- Sean Cooper – sound design
- Alicia N. Graham – management
- Lisa Hampton – assistant engineer
- Andi Howard – executive producer
- Valerie Ince – label coordinator
- Marlon Marcel – assistant engineer
- Chanté Moore – executive producer
- Reisig & Taylor – photography
- Rubin Rivera – recording engineer
- Raphael Saadiq – mixing engineer
- Tony Shepperd – recording engineer
- James Tanksley – recording engineer
- John Tanksley – recording engineer
- Cassandra Ware – management
- Mark Wexler – executive producer
- Erik Zobler – recording engineer, mixing engineer

== Charts ==
Chart performance for Love the Woman
Chart (2008)	Peak position
US Billboard 200	110
US Top R&B/Hip-Hop Albums (Billboard)	14
