= The Rise of the Phoenix =

Studio album by Chanté Moore
- Released: September 29, 2017
- Genre: R&B
- Length: 50:19
- Label: CM7
- Producer: Blu Is Free; Nate Jolley; Kwamé; LA Trax; Lil' Ronnie; LRoc; Craig Love; Mo Skillz

Chanté Moore chronology
Moore Is More (2013)	The Rise of the Phoenix (2017)	Christmas Back to You (2017)

Singles from The Rise of the Phoenix
- 1. "Real One" Released: February 3, 2017; 2. "Something to Remember" Released: August 11, 2017

The Rise of the Phoenix is the seventh studio album by American singer Chanté Moore. It was released on September 29, 2017, through CM7 Records, her record label. Moore's debut release with CM7 coincided with the 25th anniversary of her debut album Precious (1992). A breakaway from her previous albums, Moore worked with a smaller team of collaborators on the album, involving chief producer Lil' Ronnie and his team as well as LRoc and frequent contributor Kwamé.

The album debuted and peaked at number 24 on the US R&B Album Sales chart but failed to chart on the Billboard 200 or the Top R&B/Hip-Hop Albums, becoming her lowest-charting album yet. Its release was preceded by the singles "Real One" and "Something to Remember," the former of which became Moore's biggest hit in years, peaking at number ten on Billboard's Adult R&B Songs chart.

== Background ==
Following her divorce from singer Kenny Lattimore and the release of her sixth studio album, Moore Is More (2013), her only project with Shanachie Records, Moore filmed three seasons of the TV One reality series R&B Divas: Los Angeles, which aired in 2013, 2014, and 2015, respectively. While filming the series, she also wrote an autobiographical self-help book titled Will I Marry Me?, released in August 2014, which deals with her past, present, and future relationships and how they affect her personal life. The book inspired a 2015 one-woman stage adaptation as well as early material for Moore’s next album. Still, while she previewed several songs, such as the potential singles "Ghetto Love," a collaboration with rapper Kurupt, and "Put It On Fate," on the radio, their release was eventually shelved.

Also in 2016, Moore met producer Lil Ronnie who would end up producing most of her seventh studio album along with his team, including Rafael D. Ishman, Kaitlyn Williams, and Philip Lynah, Jr. Additional producers include Kwamé and LRoc, among others. In 2017, Moore founded her own label CM7 Records to release the project. The same year, she commented on the album: "[It] is about love, travel and relationships. It's titled The Rise of the Phoenix and it's indicative of how I feel right now, emerging from the ashes and everything in my life, positive and negative. I am not the same girl I was 20 years ago. I am learning how to be the best me. I make mistakes. All things work together for my good. I am glad to be clear about that. The album gives you insight into my world."

== Release ==
On October 28, 2016, Moore took to Twitter and Instagram to reveal The Rise of the Phoenix as the title of her seventh studio album. In January 2017, she announced the lead single from her album would be "Real One", with a song teaser made available for fans to listen to before its initial release on February 3, 2017. Originally, the album was scheduled to be released on February 17, 2017, then pushed back to March, and then to June. On June 26, 2017, Moore confirmed that The Rise of the Phoenix would be released in September. On August 7, 2017, Moore released a promotional video announcing that her album would be available to pre-order on August 11, 2017, along with revealing the cover art. The following day, the album's track listing was announced. The album premiered on streaming services on September 8 but was pulled down less than a week later, while the digital release date was rescheduled to September 29, and the physical release to October 20.

== Singles ==
"Real One" was released as the album's lead single on February 3, 2017. The music video premiered on March 20, 2017. The song debuted at number 29 on the Adult R&B Songs chart on April 1, 2017 and has since reached its peak at number ten on the week beginning August 19, 2017. "Something to Remember" was released as the album's second single, with a music video premiering on August 13, 2017. On November 4, 2017, "Something to Remember" debuted at number 30 on the Adult R&B Songs chart, rising to number 27 the following week.

== Reception ==
The Rise of the Phoenix became Moore's first album to neither reach the US Billboard 200 nor the Top R&B/Hip-Hop Albums chart. It, however, debuted and peaked at number 24 on Billboard's US R&B Album Sales chart. Critical reception towards the album was largely positive. Hannah Rodríguez from Wepluggoodmusic.com criticised the album for its length, but she called it "an enjoyable flashback to original R&B that'll have you singing and dancing along to the infectious hooks and sensual lyrics [...] There are definitely some killer tunes on the album and Moore does not disappoint her, in some cases, fans of twenty-five years."

== Track listing ==
The Rise of the Phoenix track listing
No.	Title	Writer(s)	Producer(s)	Length
1.	"Welcome to the Journey" (Intro)	Chanté Moore; Ronnie Jackson; Kaitlyn Williams	Lil' Ronnie	1:09
2.	"Chasin'"	Moore; Jackson; Rafael D. Ishman; Williams; Philip Lynah, Jr.; Ursula Yancy	Lil' Ronnie	3:36
3.	"On His Mind"	Moore; Jackson; Ishman; Williams; Lynah	Lil' Ronnie	3:38
4.	"I'd Be a Fool"	Moore; Nehemiah Freeman; Sherad Allen; Nathan Anderson	Blu Is Free	3:53
5.	"Pray"	Moore; Jackson; Ishman; Williams; Lynah	Lil' Ronnie	3:17
6.	"Real One"	Moore; Jackson; Ishman; Williams; Lynah; Ursula Yancy	Lil' Ronnie	3:31
7.	"SuperLover"	Moore; Kwamé Holland; Ishman	Kwamé	5:11
8.	"The Journey" (Interlude)	Moore; Jackson; Eric Dawkins	Lil' Ronnie	0:44
9.	"Saving Grace"	Moore; Lundon Adkins; Jackson	LA Trax	3:33
10.	"Breathe"	Moore; Kenneth Jones; Ursula Yancy	Mo Skillz	3:05
11.	"I Know"	Moore; Jackson; Dawkins; Philip Cornish	Lil' Ronnie	3:04
12.	"Offa-U"	Moore; James Elbert Phillips; Craig Love; Candace Wakefield	LRoc; Love	3:37
13.	"Something to Remember"	Moore; Ursula Yancy; Jackson; Ishman; Williams; Lynah	Lil' Ronnie	3:38
14.	"We Up"	Moore; Nate Jolley; Noble Jolley; Nicholas Wells; Jackson; Lynah	Nate Jolley	2:53
15.	"Pressure"	Moore; Ronie Jackson; Ishman; Williams; Lynah; Ursula Yancy; Cornish	Lil' Ronnie	3:19
16.	"Back to Life"	Moore; Jackson; Ishman; Williams; Lynah	Lil' Ronnie	4:35
17.	"Thank You for the Journey" (Outro)	Moore; Jackson; Dawkins	Lil' Ronnie	0:56
Total length:				50:19

== Charts ==
Chart performance for The Rise of the Phoenix
Chart (2017)	Peak position
US R&B Album Sales (Billboard)	24
US R&B/Hip-Hop Album Sales (Billboard)	46

== Release history ==
Release dates and formats for The Rise of the Phoenix
Country	Date	Format	Label	Ref.
United States	September 29, 2017	Digital download; CD	CM7 Records	
United Kingdom	September 29, 2017	Digital download; CD	CM7 Records	
