= Old School Lovin' =

Single by Chanté Moore

from the album A Love Supreme
- Released: October 22, 1994
- Genre: R&B
- Length: 5:02
- Label: Silas; MCA
- Songwriters: Chanté Moore; Gloria Stewart; Laney Stewart; Mark Stewart; Thaddis Harrell
- Producers: Laney Stewart; Kuk Harrell

Chanté Moore singles chronology
| "As If We Never Met" (1993) | "Old School Lovin'" (1994) | "This Time" (1994) |

"Old School Lovin'" is a song by American singer Chanté Moore. It was written by Moore along with Gloria Stewart, Laney Stewart, Mark Stewart, and Kuk Harrell for her second studio album, A Love Supreme (1994), while production was helmed by Laney Stewart and Harrell. Selected as the album's lead single, it was released by Silas Records and MCA Records on October 22, 1994 in the United States and reached number 19 on Billboard's US Hot R&B/Hip-Hop Songs chart.

== Background ==
Moore co-wrote "Old School Lovin'" with Laney Stewart, Stewart's siblings Mark and Gloria and frequent collaborator Kuk Harrell for her second studio album, A Love Supreme (1994). Production on the track was overseen by Laney Stewart and Harrell.

== Critical reception ==
Billboard editor Larry Flick called "Old School Lovin'" a "gorgeous R&B ballad" and noted: "She is growing into a stylist of the highest order, as proven within an arrangement that is lush with retro instrumental nuances. Moore clearly knows how to measure her diva outbursts, shading her scale climbing with soft and sultry tones." He found that the "wonderful track has enough of a youthful vibe to entice new-jacks'n'jils, but it is smooth enough to please mature minds, too." In his review of parent album A Love Supreme, New York Times critic Michael Eric Dyson wrote: "It is a sparkling, guitar-driven ode to intimacy built on the rituals of courtship and Ms. Moore's entrancing, overdubbed vocals [...] The song's narrative energy derives from the sly, shifting metaphor at its center; "Old School Lovin'" speaks to the need to recapture the romantic legacy in relationships by both individuals and the society as a whole."

== Chart performance ==
"Old School Lovin'" was selected by Silas Records and MCA Records as the album's lead single. Released on October 22, 1994 in the United States, it reached number 19 on Billboard's US Hot R&B/Hip-Hop Songs chart, becoming Moore's third top 20 hit on the chart, following "Love's Taken Over" (1992) and "It's Alright" (1993). The song also peaked at number 13 on the US Adult R&B Songs chart.

== Music video ==
Visuals for "Old School Lovin'" were directed by Matthew Rolston.

== Track listing ==
US CD maxi-single
| No. | Title | Producer(s) | Length |
|---|---|---|---|
| 1. | "Old School Lovin'" (LP Version) | Laney Stewart; Kuk Harrell | 4:59 |
| 2. | "Old School Lovin'" (Extended Vocal) | Stewart; Harrell | 5:55 |
| 3. | "Old School Lovin'" (Short Hot Summer Breeze Version) | Stewart; Harrell; Lukman Ibrahim^{[a]}; Derek Sochacki^{[a]} | 5:15 |
| 4. | "Old School Lovin'" (Long Hot Summer Breeze Version) | Stewart; Harrell; Ibrahim^{[a]}; Sochacki^{[a]} | 6:56 |

Notes

- ^{^[a]} signifies additional producer(s)

== Credits and personnel ==
Credits lifted from the liner notes of A Love Surpreme.

- Kevin Davis – mixing engineer
- Kuk Harrell – producer, writer
- Chanté Moore – vocalist, writer
- Gloria Stewart – writer
- Laney Stewart – producer, writer
- Mark Stewart – writer

== Charts ==
Weekly chart performance for "Old School Lovin'"
| Chart (1994) | Peak position |
|---|---|
| US Hot R&B/Hip-Hop Songs (Billboard) | 19 |

== Release history ==
Release dates and formats for "Old School Lovin'"
| Region | Date | Format(s) | Label(s) | Ref. |
|---|---|---|---|---|
| United States | October 22, 1994 | CD maxi single; 12-inch vinyl; cassette | MCA; Silas | |
