= Real One =

Real One may refer to:

== Names ==
- RealOne, former name of RealPlayer
- Real1, pseudonym of Enzo Amore

== Music ==
- Real Ones, Norwegian rock band
- The Real One 1998 album by 2 Live Crew
- "Real One" (Chanté Moore song) (2017)
- "Real One", a song by Latto from 777 (2022)
