= A Love Supreme (Chanté Moore album) =

Studio album by Chanté Moore
- Released: November 15, 1994
- Length: 71:15
- Labels: Silas; MCA
- Producers: Simon Law; Ross Anderson; Jimmy Jam and Terry Lewis; Kenneth Crouch; Kipper Jones; Tricky Stewart; Sean "Sep" Hall; H.O.P. Productions; Laney Stewart; Kuk Harrell; Bryan Loren; Jud J. Friedman

Chanté Moore chronology
| Precious (1992) | A Love Supreme (1994) | This Moment Is Mine (1999) |

Singles from A Love Supreme
- 1. "Old School Lovin'" Released: October 22, 1994; 2. "This Time" Released: May 26, 1995; 3. "Free"/"Sail On" Released: June 24, 1995; 4. "I'm What You Need" Released: July 21, 1995

A Love Supreme is the second studio album by American singer Chanté Moore. It was released by Silas Records and MCA Records on November 15, 1994, in the United States. The album followed her 1992 debut Precious. For A Love Supreme, Moore reunited with several collaborators from her debut, including Simon Law, who served as the album's primary producer, while also expanding her production team with contributions from Ross Anderson, Jimmy Jam and Terry Lewis, Kipper Jones, and Kuk Harrell.

The album was widely praised for its cohesive production, romantic themes, and Moore's expressive vocals, with critics noting its smooth blend of soul, R&B, and jazz while observing its primary appeal to a core audience. However, A Love Supreme achieved less commercial success than Moore's debut album Precious, peaking at number 20 on the UK R&B Albums chart and number 11 on the US Billboard Top R&B/Hip-Hop Albums chart. The album was supported by four singles, including lead single "Old School Lovin'," which became Moore's third top 20 hit on the US Hot R&B/Hip-Hop Songs chart.

== Background ==
In September 1992, Chanté Moore released her debut album, Precious, to generally favorable reviews from critics, who praised her smooth vocals, songwriting, and blend of soul, jazz, and contemporary R&B influences. The album performed steadily on the charts, reaching the top 20 of the US Top R&B/Hip-Hop Albums chart and later earning a Gold certification from the Recording Industry Association of America (RIAA) for shipments of over 500,000 copies. It also spawned several singles, including "Love's Taken Over," "It's Alright," and "Who Do I Turn To," helping establish Moore as one of R&B's emerging vocalists. For her next project, she reunited with several collaborators from her debut, including Simon Law, who served as the album's primary producer after producing "Love's Taken Over." She also worked again with Lee "Patches" Hamblin and Laney Stewart while expanding her production team with new collaborators such as Ross Anderson, Jimmy Jam and Terry Lewis, Kipper Jones, and Kuk Harrell.

== Promotion ==
The album was preceded by the release of lead single "Old School Lovin'." Released on October 22, 1994, in the United States, it became Moore's third top 20 hit on the US Hot R&B/Hip-Hop Songs chart, following "Love's Taken Over" (1992) and "It's Alright" (1993). Follow-up single "This Time" was issued on May 26, 1995. While it was less successful on the R&B charts, it became Moore's first top hit on Billboard's US Dance Club Songs chart. "Free"/"Sail On," a medley/mash-up of the Deniece Williams song "Free" and the Commodores song "Sail On," served as the album's third single. The song peaked at number 11 on the Dance Club Songs chart. Fourth and final single "I'm What You Need," released on July 21, 1995, reached number 14 on the US Adult R&B Songs chart. Album cut "Mood" had previously appeared on the soundtrack to the 1994 feature film Beverly Hills Cop III, released on May 10, 1994.

== Critical reception ==
Professional ratings
Review scores
| Source | Rating |
|---|---|
| AllMusic | 3.5/5 stars |
| The Atlanta Journal-Constitution | 3/4 stars |

A Love Supreme received largely favorable reviews from critics, who praised Chanté Moore's expressive vocals, romantic themes, and blend of soul, R&B, and jazz. Michael Eric Dyson, writing for The New York Times, called it a "fine album," noting its exploration of "the sophisticated romanticism" behind Moore's pursuit of love. Billboard praised its "thoughtful, romantic songs," "succulent arrangements," and "simple but expressive vocal renderings," while People described it as "a classic soul affair," comparing Moore's relaxed vocal style to "a young Diana Ross with more lung power."

Sherrie Winston of the Sun Sentinel found that throughout A Love Supreme "Moore combines sultry vocals with lyrics of chivalry, romance and spirituality. The singer's range is phenomenal; her style undeniable." Winston further described the album as "a mellow listen that layers gritty island sounds with singing violins and harps. If the rap infusion has got you down, Moore offers a mellow, sexy and talented reprieve", delivering "its message with subtlety. The way it used to be." Washington Post critic Richard Harrington called the album "a beautifully crafted song-cycle tracing the evolution of a romantic relationship [...] Given the number of producers involved – some 15 in all – it's remarkable that the album has thematic and sonic unity [...] While Moore is clearly capable of Minnie Ripperton-style heights into the stratosphere she communicates greater emotional presence by riding slow, deep grooves that allow her to sing with smoldering commitment." Similarly, Sonia Murray of The Atlanta Journal-Constitution wrote, "Putting this album on is like pressing play on the romance machine. Moore, the closest thing R&B has to a modern-day Minnie Ripperton, weaves her vocal gift around valentine after valentine on A Love Supreme."

AllMusic said, "On A Love Supreme, Chante Moore's supple, sensuous vocals snake around jazzy, R&B mid-tempo grooves, in search of the perfect love. From the sultry, spoken opening where she unmistakably states her modern-day intentions to the old phono recording scratches of 'Old School Lov', Chante searches, preys, teases, romances, and snares."

== Chart performance ==
A Love Supreme debuted and peaked at number 64 on the US Billboard 200 in the week of March 12, 1994. It also opened at number 11 on the Top R&B/Hip-Hop Albums chart. This marked Moore's second top 20 entry on the chart. A Love Supreme also became the singer's first album to debut in the United Kingdom. While it peaked at number 144 on the UK Albums Chart, it fared better on the UK R&B Albums Chart, reaching number 20. Billboard ranked the album 55th on its 1995 Top R&B/Hip-Hop Albums year-end chart.

== Track listing ==
A Love Supreme track listing
| No. | Title | Writer(s) | Producer(s) | Length |
|---|---|---|---|---|
| 1. | "Intro" | Simon Law | Law | 0:51 |
| 2. | "Searchin'" | Chanté Moore; Christopher Stewart; Sean "Sep" Hall | Tricky Stewart; Hall | 5:34 |
| 3. | "This Time" | Moore; Lee Hamblin; Law | Law; Hamblin; Moore^{[a]} | 5:59 |
| 4. | "My Special Perfect One" | Moore; Harvey Brough; Ross Anderson; Law | Law; Anderson; Moore^{[a]} | 5:29 |
| 5. | "I'm What You Need" | Donald Parks; Emanuel Officer; John Howcott | Parks; Officer; Howcott | 4:59 |
| 6. | "Your Love's Supreme" | Moore; Kenneth Crouch; Kipper Jones | Crouch; Jones | 4:30 |
| 7. | "Old School Lovin'" | Moore; Gloria Stewart; Laney Stewart; Mark Stewart; Thaddis Harrell | L. Stewart; Kuk Harrell | 5:02 |
| 8. | "Free"/"Sail On" | Deniece Williams; Henry Redd; Nathan Watts; Susaye Greene; Lionel Richie | Law; Anderson; Moore^{[a]} | 5:49 |
| 9. | "Without Your Love" (Interlude) | Cynthia Harrell; Laney Stewart; Paula Payden; Thaddis Harrell | L. Stewart; Harrell | 0:55 |
| 10. | "I Want to Thank You" | Kevin McCord | Law; Anderson; Moore^{[a]} | 7:59 |
| 11. | "Mood" | Moore; James Harris III; Terry Lewis | Jimmy Jam & Terry Lewis | 4:12 |
| 12. | "Thank You for Loving Me" | Moore; Eddie Ricketts; Michael Norfleet | Bryan Loren; Moore^{[b]}; Norfleet^{[b]} | 4:59 |
| 13. | "Soul Dance" | Jones; Reggie Stewart | Jones | 4:13 |
| 14. | "Am I Losing You?" | Moore; Anderson; Law; Vaneta Thompson | Law; Anderson; Moore^{[a]} | 5:59 |
| 15. | "Thou Shalt Not" | Allan Rich; Jud Friedman; Sheila E. | Friedman | 4:48 |
| Total length: | | | | 1:11:15 |

Notes

- ^{^[a]} signifies a vocal producer
- ^{^[b]} signifies a co-producer

== Personnel ==
- Mark Abetz – engineer
- Judi Acosta-Stewart – production coordination
- Scott Alspach – producer
- Michael Alvord - assistant engineer
- Ross Anderson – bass, drum programming, guitar, mixing, producer
- Philip Bailey – guest artist, vocals (background)
- Tom Baker – assistant engineer
- Gary Barnacle – flute
- Harvey Brough – string arrangements
- Alexandra Brown – vocals (background)
- Bridgette Bryant – vocals (Background)
- James "Chip" Bunton – production coordination
- David Campbell – string arrangements
- Bryan Carrigan – second engineer
- Teddy Castellucci – guitar
- Richard Cottrell – engineer
- Kenneth Crouch – multi instruments, producer
- Paulinho da Costa – percussion
- Kevin "KD" Davis – engineer, mixing
- Sean Davis – assistant engineer
- C.J. DeVillar – assistant engineer
- George Duke – guest artist
- Derrick Edmondson – saxophone
- Danny Flynn – stylist
- Gwyn Foxx – vocals (background)
- Jud J. Friedman – keyboards, producer, string arrangements
- Siedah Garrett – guest artist, vocals (background)
- Sean "Sep" Hall – producer, programming, rhythm arrangements, sequencing, vocal arrangement
- Lee Hamblin – drum programming, engineer, mixing, producer
- Cynthia Harrell – vocals (background)
- Kuk Harrell – engineer, producer, vocal arrangement
- Steve Hodge – mixing
- Jean-Marie Horvat – mixing
- John Howcott – drum programming, keyboard programming, producer
- Richard Huredia – mixing assistant
- Phillip Ingram – vocals (background)
- Booker T. Jones – mixing
- Kipper Jones – guest artist, producer, vocals (background)
- Pat Karamian – assistant engineer, second engineer
- Brian Kilgore – percussion
- Simon A. Law – bass, drum programming, keyboards, mixing, producer, string arrangements
- Eugene Le – second engineer
- Maxayn Lewis – vocals (background)
- Jeff Madjef Taylor – asst engineer/drum programming
- Eugene Lo – second engineer
- Chris London – assistant engineer
- Chanté Moore – executive producer, primary artist, producer, vocal arrangement, vocals, vocals (background)
- Taavi Mote – engineer
- Fred Moultrie – executive producer
- Steve Musters- assistant engineer
- Rick Nelson – vocals (background)
- Michael Norfleet – multi instruments, producer
- Emanuel Officer – producer, vocal arrangement
- Steve Orchard – engineer
- Sue Owens – production coordination
- Donald Parks – drum programming, keyboard programming, producer
- Greg Phillinganes – keyboards
- Neil Pogue – engineer
- Herb Powers – mastering
- Adrian Reid – Fender Rhodes
- Kevin Robinson – flugelhorn
- Matthew Rolston – photography
- Jeff Scantlebury – percussion
- Louis Silas Jr. – executive producer
- Christopher "Tricky" Stewart – producer, programming, rhythm arrangements, sequencing, vocal arrangement
- Laney Stewart – engineer, producer, programming, sequencing, vocal arrangement
- Reggie Stewart – drum programming, keyboard programming
- Lisa Taylor – vocals (background)
- Francesca Tolot – make-up
- Simon Wall – assistant engineer
- Ilene Weingard – art direction, design
- Warren Woods – engineer
- Gavyn Wright – conductor
- Jim "Z" Zumpano – engineer

== Charts ==
=== Weekly charts ===
Weekly chart performance for A Love Supreme
| Chart (1994) | Peak position |
|---|---|
| UK Albums (OCC) | 144 |
| UK R&B Albums (OCC) | 20 |
| US Billboard 200 | 64 |
| US Top R&B/Hip-Hop Albums (Billboard) | 11 |

=== Year-end charts ===
Year-end chart performance for A Love Supreme
| Chart (1995) | Position |
|---|---|
| US Top R&B/Hip-Hop Albums (Billboard) | 55 |
