= Christmas Back to You =

2017 studio album by Chanté Moore

Studio album by Chanté Moore
- Released: November 3, 2017
- Genre: Christmas
- Length: 40:24
- Label: CM7
- Producer: Lil' Ronnie

Chanté Moore chronology
The Rise of the Phoenix (2017)	Christmas Back to You (2017)	A Toxic Love (2026)

Singles from Christmas Back to You
- 1. "Cover Me in Snow" Released: October 23, 2017; 2. "Every Day's Like Christmas" Released: November 23, 2018

Christmas Back to You is the eighth studio album by American R&B artist Chanté Moore. It was released on November 3, 2017, through Moore's own CM7 Records. The album was preceded by the release of the single "Cover Me in Snow." Christmas Back to You marked Moore's first full-length Christmas album; following "Christmas Morn", released on the MCA Records compilation, My Christmas Album (1999) and the Boney James release, "Santa Baby" from the album Christmas Present (2007).

== Singles ==
"Cover Me In Snow" premiered as the album's lead single on October 23, 2017, with the release of a music video. EBONY writer Bianca Garwood describes, the video as "sultry", writing, 'The visual finds the music veteran in a one-piece suit under a sleeveless fur. She later takes it up a notch and lays in a bathtub covered with diamonds.' Speaking on the album, Christmas Back to You, Moore expressed, “I am beyond excited to finally be able to release this amazing body of work,” Moore shared. I love Christmas and to be able to give my fans something different and from the heart, feels awesome.”

"Every Day's Like Christmas" was released as the album's second single in 2018. In December, 2018, it debuted at number 43 on the Mediabase Urban Adult Contemporary chart, peaking at number 34 on December 26, 2018. In 2022, "Every Day's Like Christmas" re-entered the Mediabase Urban Adult Contemporary chart at number 42.

== Critical reception ==
The New York Times reviewed Christmas Back to You positively, writing that Moore "sounds robust on this album, but maybe not in the ways you expect," explaining further: "Moore sings in the clipped syllables of Atlanta rap." Brandon Lucas from Kontrol found that "overall, this is a solid album for what it’s supposed to be. Don’t expect a Grammy nominee for album of the year, but a collection of tracks that you and the whole fam can sing along and dance to."

== Track listing ==
All tracks produced by Lil' Ronnie.

Christmas Back to You track listing
No.	Title	Writer(s)	Length
1.	"The Christmas Song"	Mel Tormé; Robert Wells; Ronnie Jackson	3:43
2.	"Christmas Back to You"	Chanté Moore; Daniel Bryant; Eric Dawkins; Jackson	3:57
3.	"Cover Me in Snow"	C. Moore; Bryant; Jeremiah "Sickpen" Bethea; Jackson; Sharod Virtuoso	3:25
4.	"Every Day's Like Christmas"	C. Moore; Bryant; Bethea; Philip Lynah, Jr.; Jackson	3:43
5.	"Birthday"	C. Moore; Bryant; Bethea; Jackson; Virtuoso	3:05
6.	"Have Yourself a Merry Little Christmas"	Ralph Blane; Jackson	3:17
7.	"Merry Christmas Baby"	Johnny Moore; Lou Baxter; Jackson	4:30
8.	"Please Come Home for Christmas"	Charles Brown; Gene Redd; Jackson	3:56
9.	"Santa Don't Sleigh"	C. Moore; Lynah; Rafael D. Ishman; Jackson	3:39
10.	"Silent Night"	Franz Xaver Gruber; Joseph Mohr; Jackson	3:51
11.	"Christmas in L.A."	C. Moore; Lynah; Ishman; Jackson	3:11
Total length:			40:24

== Release history ==
Release dates and formats for Christmas Back to You
Country	Date	Format	Label
United States	November 3, 2017	Digital download; CD	CM7 Records
United Kingdom	November 3, 2017	Digital download; CD	CM7 Records
