= This Time (Chanté Moore song) =

Single by Chanté Moore

from the album A Love Supreme
- Released: May 26, 1995
- Length: 5:59
- Label: Silas; MCA
- Songwriters: Chanté Moore; Lee Hamblin; Simon Law
- Producers: Lee Hamblin; Simon Law

Chanté Moore singles chronology
"Old School Lovin'" (1994)	"This Time" (1995)	"I'm What You Need" (1995)

"This Time" is a song by American singer Chanté Moore. It was written by Moore along with Lee Hamblin and Simon Law for her second studio album, A Love Supreme (1994), while production was helmed by Hamblin and Law, with Moore credited as a vocal producer. Selected as the album's second single, it was released by Silas Records and MCA Records on May 26, 1995 in the United States and reached number five on Billboard's US Dance Club Songs chart.

== Critical reception ==
New York Times critic Michael Eric Dyson wrote in his review of parent album A Love Supreme: "On the jazzy, hip-hop-influenced "This Time," Ms. Moore passionately expresses gratitude for a second chance at getting love right."

== Chart performance ==
"This Time" marked Moore's first single to debut at Billboard's US Dance Club Songs chart. It eventually reached number five in the week of June 10, 1995. The song was less successful on the US Hot R&B/Hip-Hop Songs chart, where it peaked at number 61.

== Music video ==
Visuals for "This Time" were directed by Randee St. Nicholas.

== Track listing ==
US cassette single
No.	Title	Producer(s)	Length
1.	"This Time" (LP Version)	Lee Hamblin; Simon Law	5:59
2.	"This Time" (instrumental edit)	Hamblin; Law	5:59

US CD maxi-single
No.	Title	Producer(s)	Length
1.	"This Time" (Allstar's Club Butter Version)	Hamblin; Law; Allen "Allstar" Gordon Jr.^{[a]}	6:19
2.	"This Time" (A.G.'s Dub)	Hamblin; Law; Gordon^{[a]}	5:21
3.	"This Time" (The Bomb Mix)	Hamblin; Law; Frankie Knuckles^{[a]}	10:49
4.	"Old School Lovin'" (The Correct Effect Club Version)	Stewart; Harrell; Jeff Gill^{[a]}; Martin Kember^{[a]}	6:37

Notes

- ^{^[a]} signifies additional producer(s)

== Credits and personnel ==
Credits lifted from the liner notes of A Love Surpreme.

- Lee Hamblin – producer, writer
- Simon Law – producer, writer
- Chanté Moore – arranger, vocal producer, vocalist, writer
- Angelo Quaglia – engineer

== Charts ==
Weekly chart performance for "This Time"
Chart (1995)	Peak position
US Hot R&B/Hip-Hop Songs (Billboard)	61
US Dance Club Songs (Billboard)	5

== Release history ==
Release dates and formats for "This Time"
Region	Date	Format(s)	Label(s)	Ref.
United States	May 26, 1995	CD maxi single; 12-inch vinyl; cassette	MCA; Silas	
