= Exposed (Chanté Moore album) =

Studio album by Chanté Moore
- Released: November 14, 2000
- Recorded: January–August 2000
- Length: 50:41
- Labels: Silas; MCA
- Producers: Bryan Michael Cox; Jermaine Dupri; Kevin Hicks; Jamey Jaz; Jimmy Jam & Terry Lewis; Colin Morrison; Donnie Scantz; Laney Stewart; Tricky Stewart; Tim & Bob; Katrina Willis

Chanté Moore chronology
This Moment Is Mine (1999)	Exposed (2000)	Things That Lovers Do (2003)

Singles from Exposed
- 1. "Straight Up" Released: August 2000; 2. "Bitter" Released: November 17, 2000; 3. "Take Care of Me" Released: February 7, 2001

Exposed is the fourth studio album by American singer Chanté Moore. It was released by Silas Records and MCA Records on November 14, 2000, in the United States. Work on Exposed was fast-tracked following the success of "Chanté's Got a Man" (1999), with recording taking place between January and August 2000. The album saw Moore working with a range of new collaborators, including duo Tim & Bob, Bryan Michael Cox, and executive producer Jermaine Dupri whose sound took her work further into the contemporary R&B genre and introduced a more "edgy and street-oriented" emphasis to her music.

Upon release, Exposed earned largely positive reviews with most critics praising Moore's vocal performance while others criticised her shift in sound. It debuted and peaked at number fifty on the US Billboard 200 and became her second album to reach the top ten of the Top R&B/Hip-Hop Albums chart selling 36,712 copies in its first week, and over 93,000 copies in its first four weeks. Exposed was preceded by its lead single "Straight Up", a top 20 success in Belgium and the United Kingdom. Follow-up singles "Bitter" and "Take Care of Me" were released in support of the album, though neither matched the international success of "Straight Up."

== Background ==
In May 1999, Chanté Moore released This Moment Is Mine, her third studio album. A departure from the jazz-influenced R&B style of its predecessors, the album embraced a broader contemporary R&B sound shaped in large part by its main producers Jimmy Jam & Terry Lewis, and saw Moore take a larger creative role as executive producer and co-writer. Led by the top-ten hit "Chanté's Got a Man," it became her most commercially successful release to date and marked her crossover breakthrough. However, promotion for the album concluded after "If I Gave Love," originally intended as the second single, was shelved when producer Rodney Jerkins reworked a similar composition for Jennifer Lopez's highly successful debut single "If You Had My Love" (1999), leaving "I See You in a Different Light," a duet with JoJo Hailey, to serve as the follow-up, though it achieved only modest chart success.

In response to the success of "Chanté's Got a Man," work on Moore's next album was fast-tracked. Recording sessions took place between January and August 2000, marking the shortest recording period of her career to that point, with "I'm Keepin' You" being the final song completed for the album. Although Moore viewed the material as a continuation of the direction established by "Chanté's Got a Man," she described the songs as more "aggressive," incorporating edgier, more street-oriented sounds than her previous work. To achieve this, paired her with a broader roster of hip hop and R&B producers, including Tim & Bob, Tricky Stewart, Bryan Michael Cox, and Jermaine Dupri, who also served as the album's executive producer. Moore attributed the album's lyrical themes to her personal growth and changing priorities, drawing additional inspiration from the breakdown of her marriage to actor Kadeem Hardison.

== Promotion ==
Exposed was preceded by lead single "Straight Up," co-written by Lil' Mo and released in August 2000. Reflecting the album's shift toward a more contemporary, hip hop-influenced R&B sound, it marked the first time Moore had released an uptempo song as a lead single. The Dupri-produced track became her biggest international hit to date, expanding her presence into markets where she had not previously charted. It reached number 11 on the UK Singles Chart, number 12 in Belgium and number 22 in France, while also peaking at number two on the UK R&B Singles and number five on the UK Dance Singles chart. In the United States, however, it achieved more modest success, reaching number 22 on the Hot R&B/Hip-Hop Songs chart and failing to enter the top 50 of the pop chart. Visuals for the song were directed by Bille Woodruff.

Promotion of the album's second single "Bitter" was interlinked with "Contagious," Moore's Grammy Award-nominated 2001 collaboration with R. Kelly and The Isley Brothers, which appeared on The Isley Brothers' 2001 studio album Enternal. The song charted at number 55 on the Hot R&B/Hip-Hop Songs chart, and became a top ten hit on the Adult R&B Songs chart. The song's music video, directed by Aaron Courseault, served as a continuation of the video for "Contagious" (2001). Kelly makes a cameo appearance in "Bitter." "Take Care of Me" featuring rapper Da Brat was issued by Silas Records on February 7, 2001 as the album's third and final single but failed to make a significant impact on the charts.

== Critical reception ==
Professional ratings
Aggregate scores
Source	Rating
Metacritic	66/100
Review scores
Source	Rating
AllMusic	4/5 stars
Entertainment Weekly	B
NME	2/5 stars
Vibe	3/5 stars

Exposed received generally favorable reviews from music critics, who praised Moore's vocal performance and the album's blend of contemporary R&B and hip hop influences, though some criticized its attempts to reposition her image. At Metacritic, which assigns a normalized rating out of 100 based on reviews from mainstream publications, the album holds an average score of 66 from four reviews, indicating "generally favorable reviews." Steve Kurutz from AllMusic noted that Exposed "makes a bid to capture some of that trademark funkiness," praising Moore's vocal range and comparing her "throaty take charge style" to Toni Braxton and her "soft vulnerability" to Janet Jackson, while highlighting her "undeniable sexiness" and emotional conviction. PopMatters critic Charlotte Robinson praised Exposed for Moore's vocal restraint, strong songwriting, and emotionally nuanced performances. She highlighted "I'm Keepin' You" and "Bitter" as standout tracks, noting their unconventional approaches to themes of infidelity and heartbreak, and concluded that the album contained no filler.

Entertainment Weekly's Craig Seymour described the album as a "sweet throwback to sophisticated '70s soul divas like Angela Bofill and Deniece Williams," adding that Moore maintained her poise and romanticism while working with hip hop-oriented producers such as Jermaine Dupri and Tim & Bob. Writing for Vibe, Michael A. Gonzales observed that while Moore had long been associated with quiet storm R&B, Exposed represented an effort to move beyond her "good-girl" image and portray a more mature, world-weary persona. Ebony editor Lynn Norment similarly praised the album for revealing more of Moore's personality, noting its themes of female independence, sensuality, and confidence. The Morning Call also noted that Exposed represented a departure from Moore's earlier romantic image, highlighting its more assertive, sexual, and street-oriented approach as well as the album's edgier production, while noting that it moved away from the smooth, poetic ballad style of her previous work. Less impressed, Adenike Adenitire from NME felt that songs such as "Take Care of Me" and "I'm Keepin' You" presented Moore as guarded and vulnerable, arguing that her attempt to adopt a new persona sometimes conflicted with her natural strengths. Despite the mixed criticism, Billboard contributor David Nathan ranked Exposed at number three on his year-end Critic's Choice list for 2000, calling it Moore's long-awaited mainstream breakthrough and noting that it demonstrated her ability to compete among contemporary R&B's leading artists.

== Commercial performance ==
Exposed debuted and peaked at number 50 on the US Billboard 200 in the week of December 12, 2000. It also opened at number 10 on the US Top R&B/Hip-Hop Albums, becoming Moore's second top ten entry on the chart. Elsewhere, it became the singer's first album to debut at the French Albums Chart, peaking at number 130. Exposed also charted in the United Kingdom, reaching number 186 on the UK Albums Chart and number 28 on the UK R&B Albums Charts. Billboard ranked it 97th on its 2001 Top R&B/Hip-Hop Albums year-end listing.

== Track listing ==
Exposed track listing
No.	Title	Writer(s)	Producer(s)	Length
1.	"Straight Up"	Bryan-Michael Cox; Cynthia Loving; Jermaine Dupri	Dupri; Cox^{[a]}	3:40
2.	"Take Care of Me" (featuring Da Brat)	Chanté Moore; Tim Kelley; Bob Robinson	Tim & Bob	4:03
3.	"I'm Keepin' You"	Colin Morrison; Katrina Willis	Morrison; Willis	4:43
4.	"Go Ahead With All That"	Cox; Dupri	Dupri; Cox^{[a]}	3:47
5.	"Bitter"	Moore; Willis; Phillip Stewart	Stewart	3:11
6.	"When It Comes to Me"	Moore; Kelle; Robinson	Tim & Bob	4:20
7.	"Train of Thought"	Moore; Willis; Stewart	Stewart	3:52
8.	"Better Than Making Love"	Moore; James Wright; James Harris III; Terry Lewis	Jimmy Jam and Terry Lewis	5:04
9.	"Man"	Cox; Moore; Donnie Scantz; Kevin Hicks	Cox; Scantz; Hicks; Moore^{[b]}	3:55
10.	"You Can't Leave Me"	Christopher Stewart; Willis; Traci Hale	Tricky Stewart	3:52
11.	"Everything We Want"	Jamey Jaz; John "Jubu" Smith; Sherree Ford-Payne	Jaz	4:19
12.	"Love's Still Alright"	Moore; Wright; Harris III; Lewis	Jimmy Jam and Terry Lewis	6:00
Total length:				50:41

Japanese bonus tracks
No.	Title	Writer(s)	Producer(s)	Length
13.	"Nobody"	Moore; Scantz; Hicks	Scantz; Hicks	3:25
14.	"Why Am I Lonely"	Diane Warren	Guy Roche	3:54

United Kingdom special edition bonus tracks
No.	Title	Writer(s)	Producer(s)	Length
13.	"Nobody"	Moore; Scantz; Hicks	Scantz; Hicks	3:25
14.	"I See You in a Different Light" (featuring JoJo Hailey)	Warren	Guy Roche; Warren^{[a]}	4:23

Notes

- ^{^a} denotes co-producer
- ^{^b} denotes vocal producer

== Personnel ==
Credits adapted from the liner notes of Exposed.

Musicians

- Bryan-Michael Cox – instruments
- Da Brat – featured vocals
- Kevin Hicks – guitar
- Jimmy Jam – instruments
- Jamey Jaz – keyboards
- Tim Kelley – bass, drums, keyboards, programming
- Sonya Knight – backing vocals
- Terry Lewis – instruments
- Chanté Moore – lead vocals, backing vocals, vocal production
- Colin Morrison – drum programming, instruments
- Bob Robinson – acoustic guitar
- Donnie Scantz – instruments
- Derek Scott – guitar
- Laney Stewart – programming, sequencing
- Tricky Stewart – keyboards
- Katrina Willis – backing vocals, vocal arrangement, vocal production
- James "Big Jim" Wright – keyboards, instruments
- Kevin Wyatt – bass

Technical

- Elliott Blakey – assistant engineer
- Bryan-Michael Cox – producer
- Malik Crawford – recording engineer
- Kevin "KD" Davis – mixing engineer
- Jermaine Dupri – executive producer, producer
- Tony Flores – assistant engineer
- Brian Frye – recording engineer
- Andy Haller – recording engineer
- Steve Hodge – mixing engineer
- John Horesco IV – assistant mix engineer
- Jimmy Jam & Terry Lewis – producers
- Jamey Jaz – producer, recording engineer
- Thom "TK" Kidd – mixing engineer
- Manny Marroquin – mixing engineer
- Peter Mokran – mixing engineer
- Chanté Moore – executive producer
- Kevin Parker – recording engineer
- Dave Rideau – recording engineer
- Xavier Smith – assistant engineer
- Laney Stewart – producer, programmer, sequencer
- Tricky Stewart – producer
- Phil Tan – mixing engineer
- Craig Taylor – assistant engineer
- Tim & Bob – producers
- Brian "B. Luv" Thomas – recording engineer
- Sam Thomas – recording engineer
- Arnold "AJ" Wolfe – recording engineer
- Brad Yost – assistant engineer

== Charts ==
=== Weekly charts ===
Weekly chart performance for Exposed
Chart (2000–2001)	Peak position
French Albums (SNEP)	130
UK Albums (OCC)	186
UK R&B Albums (Official Charts)	28
US Billboard 200	50
US Top R&B/Hip-Hop Albums (Billboard)	10

=== Year-end charts ===
Year-end chart performance for Exposed
Chart (2001)	Position
US Top R&B/Hip-Hop Albums (Billboard)	97

== Release history ==
Release dates and formats for Exposed
Region	Date	Format(s)	Label	Ref.
United States	November 14, 2000	CD; cassette	Silas; MCA	
Japan	November 22, 2000	CD; cassette	Silas; MCA	
United Kingdom	April 2, 2001	CD; cassette	Silas; MCA	
