= 1999 Soul Train Lady of Soul Awards =

American awards show

Soul Train Lady of Soul Awards
- Date: September 3, 1999
- Location: Santa Monica Civic Auditorium, Santa Monica, California
- Country: United States
- Hosted by: Shemar Moore, Deborah Cox, Monica, Busta Rhymes

Highlights
- Most awards: Lauryn Hill (2), TLC (2)

The 1999 Soul Train Lady of Soul Awards were held on September 3, 1999, at the Santa Monica Civic Auditorium in Santa Monica, California. Produced by Don Cornelius Productions, the fourth annual awards program was co-hosted by Shemar Moore, Deborah Cox, Monica and Busta Rhymes.

== Special awards ==
=== Aretha Franklin Award for Entertainer of the Year ===
- TLC

=== Lena Horne Award for Outstanding Career Achievement ===
- Natalie Cole

== Winners and nominees ==
Winners are in bold text.

=== Best R&B/Soul Single – Solo ===
- **Lauryn Hill – "Ex-Factor"**
  - Chanté Moore – "Chanté's Got a Man"
  - Deborah Cox – "Nobody's Supposed To Be Here"
  - Monica – "Angel of Mine"

=== Best R&B/Soul Single – Group, Band or Duo ===
- **TLC – "No Scrubs"**
  - 702 – "Where My Girls At?"
  - Brandy and Monica – "The Boy Is Mine"
  - Whitney Houston featuring Faith Evans and Kelly Price – "Heartbreak Hotel"

=== R&B/Soul Album of the Year – Solo ===
- **Lauryn Hill – The Miseducation of Lauryn Hill**
  - Brandy – Never Say Never
  - Monica – The Boy Is Mine
  - Whitney Houston – My Love Is Your Love

=== R&B/Soul Album of the Year – Group, Band or Duo ===
- **TLC – FanMail**
  - Les Nubians – Princesses Nubiennes
  - Total – Kima, Keisha and Pam
  - Xscape – Traces of My Lipstick

=== Best R&B/Soul or Rap New Artist ===
- **Les Nubians – "Makeda"**
  - Divine – "Lately"
  - Shae Jones – "Talk Show Shhh!"
  - Blaque – "808"

=== Best R&B/Soul or Rap Music Video ===
- **Lauryn Hill – "Doo Wop (That Thing)"**
  - Aaliyah – "Are You That Somebody?"
  - Foxy Brown – "Hot Spot"
  - Missy Elliott – "She's A Bitch"

=== Best Gospel Album ===
- **CeCe Winans – His Gift**
  - Trin-i-tee 5:7 – Trin-i-tee 5:7
  - Kim Burrell – Everlasting Life

=== Best Jazz Album ===
- **Cassandra Wilson – Traveling Miles**
  - Nnenna Freelon – Maiden Voyage
  - Patricia Barber – Modern Cool
  - Shirley Horn – I Remember Miles

=== R&B/Soul or Rap Song of the Year ===
- **Deborah Cox – "Nobody's Supposed to Be Here"**
  - Lauryn Hill – "Ex-Factor"
  - Aaliyah – "Are You That Somebody?"
  - Mýa featuring Silkk the Shocker – "Movin' On"
