= Real One (song) =

Single by Chanté Moore

from the album The Rise of the Phoenix
- Released: February 3, 2017
- Length: 3:32
- Label: CM7
- Songwriters: Chanté Moore; Lil' Ronnie; Ronnie Jackson; Rafael D. Ishman; Kaitlyn Williams; Philip Lynah Jr.; Ursula Yancy
- Producer: Lil' Ronnie

Chanté Moore singles chronology
"I Know, Right" (2014)	"Real One" (2017)	"Something To Remember" (2017)

Real One is a song by American R&B singer Chanté Moore, taken from her seventh studio album The Rise of the Phoenix (2017). The song was released on February 3, 2017, through CM7 Records. The song was written by Moore, Ursula Yancy, and Lil' Ronnie and produced by Ronnie.

== Background and release ==
In an interview with Rolling Out March 8, 2017, Moore talked about the track stating "I’m more excited by this record than I have been in a really long time. It’s my seventh solo album. It’s 2017. My birthday just passed, 2/17. We just did a video that will be out really soon. I am in love and I wrote about it. After six years of being single, I got a man … for real."

== Critical reception ==
The song was met with a positive response from critics. ThisisRnB praised the song "Moore celebrates and salutes the magic of real love on the radiant song." Singersroom branded the track as "a feel-good vibe".

== Chart performance ==
"Real One" debuted at number twenty 29 on the Adult R&B Songs chart on April 1, 2017. In the songs sixteenth week the song peaked at number thirteen. In its twentyfirst week the song peaked at number 10.

== Music video ==
The music video was released to Moore's YouTube channel on March 20, 2017. It was directed by GVisuals.

== Formats and track listings ==
Digital download

1. "Real One" – 3:32

== Charts ==
=== Weekly charts ===
Weekly chart performance for "Real One"
Chart (2017)	Peak position
US Adult R&B Songs (Billboard)	10
US R&B/Hip-Hop Airplay (Billboard)	39

=== Year-end charts ===
Year-end chart performance for "Real One"
Chart (2017)	Peak position
US Adult R&B Songs (Billboard)	28

== Release history ==
Release dates and formats for "Real One"
Country	Date	Format	Label	Ref.
United States	February 3, 2017	Digital download	CM7 Records	
United Kingdom	February 3, 2017	Digital download	CM7 Records	
