= Moore Is More =

Moore is More

Studio album by Chanté Moore
- Released: July 30, 2013
- Genre: R&B
- Length: 42:16
- Label: Shanachie
- Producers: 808N; Derrick A.; Louis Biancaniello; Brian Buie; Chris Davis; Delfaireo "Fario" Emory; Antwann Frost; Kwamé; Midi Mafia; Dre Manuel; Chanté Moore; La Tendré Moore; Twice as Nice; Sam Watters

Chanté Moore chronology
Love the Woman (2008)	Moore is More (2013)	The Rise of the Phoenix (2017)

Singles from Moore is More
- 1. "Talking In My Sleep" Released: June 2013; 2. "Jesus, I Want You" Released: July 2013

Moore is More is the sixth studio album by American R&B singer Chanté Moore. It was released by Shanachie Records on July 30, 2013. Moore's first and only release with Shanachie, the album featured production from Louis Biancaniello, Sam Watters, Midi Mafia, Kwamé, Chris Davis, 808N, Dre Manuel, and others. Moore is More peaked at number 184 on the US Billboard 200 and number 27 on the Top R&B/Hip-Hop Albums, marking her lowest chart yet, and was preceded by the release of two singles "Talking in My Sleep" and "Jesus, I Want You".

== Background and release ==
Moore is More was Chanté Moore's first album in five years, and first release via Shanachie Records. The singer referred to the album as a reflection of her life at the moment, and added that it is therefore aggressive, happy, joyful, and bubbly. In an interview with soulmusic.com in May 2013, the singer explained: "I am having fun being able to sing about things that I can’t talk about. There are break-up issues and emotions that I feel regarding my last marriage. There’s lots of things that just aren’t even proper to even say out loud, except I can sing about them because it just makes more sense".

== Critical reception ==
Professional ratings
Review scores
Source	Rating
AllMusic	3.5/5 stars

Andy Kellman from AllMusic wrote that "like her previous album, 2008's Love the Woman, Moore mixes it up with "grown" and contemporary pop-R&B sounds, but she does it with a fresh and lengthy supporting cast that includes Chris "Big Dog" Davis, Kwamé, the Midi Mafia, and Louis Biancaniello and Sam Watters. There's a little more range, from the blaring and cluttered dance-pop of "On and On" (featuring a guest spot from Da Brat) to a magnetic version of the '50s torch song "Cry Me a River." Unsurprisingly, the latter is a better fit, and the songs closer to it in style – more refined, deeply felt, and pared down to suit Moore's still-remarkable voice – are what make the album attractive."

== Track listing ==
No.	Title	Writer(s)	Producer(s)	Length
1.	"Baby Can I Touch Your Body"	Chris Davis; Chanté Moore	Davis	4:07
2.	"Talking In My Sleep"	Nick Audino; Louis Biancaniello; Treasure Davis; Lewis Hughes; Moore; Sam Watters	Biancaniello; Watters; Twice as Nice	4:03
3.	"Alone"	Kwamé; Moore	Kwamé	3:15
4.	"Don't Make Me Laugh"	Brian Buie; Delfaireo "Fario" Emory; Moore	Buie; Emory	4:48
5.	"Doctor Doctor"	Kwamé; Moore	Kwamé	2:57
6.	"Mrs. Under, Stood"	Antwann Frost; Moore	Frost	5:01
7.	"On And On" (featuring Da Brat)	Shawntae Harris; Moore; Waynne Nugent; Kevin Risto; Aydin Ali	808in; Midi Mafia	4:17
8.	"Giving You My Always"	Derrick A.; Dre Manuel; Moore	Derrick A.; Dre Manuel	4:33
9.	"Jesus, I Want You"	Chanté Moore; La Tendré Moore	Chanté Moore; La Tendré Moore	5:42
10.	"Cry Me a River"	Arthur Hamilton	Davis	4:57
Total length:				42:16

== Charts ==
Chart performance for Moore Is More
Chart (2013)	Peak position
US Billboard 200	184
US Top R&B/Hip-Hop Albums (Billboard)	27

== Release history ==
Release dates and formats for Moore Is More
Country	Date	Format	Label	Ref.
United States	July 30, 2013	Digital download; CD	Shanachie Records; eOne	
United Kingdom	July 30, 2013	Digital download; CD	Shanachie Records; eOne	
