= Bitter (Chanté Moore song) =

Single by Chanté Moore

from the album Exposed
- Released: November 17, 2000
- Length: 3:11
- Label: Silas; MCA
- Songwriters: Chanté Moore; Laney Stewart; Katrina Willis
- Producer: Stewart

Chanté Moore singles chronology
"Straight Up" (2000)	"Bitter" (2000)	"Take Care of Me" (2001)

Audio
- "Bitter" on YouTube

"Bitter" is a song by American singer Chanté Moore. It was written by Moore, Katrina Willis, and Laney Stewart for her fourth studio album Exposed (2000), while production was helmed by the latter. A downtempo song about the pain and anger after a relationship has been shattered by lies, it was released as the album's second single on November 17, 2000. "Bitter" garnered largely positive reviews from music critics and peaked at number 10 on the Adult R&B Songs chart.

== Background ==
"Bitter" was written by Chanté Moore along with songwriter Katrina Willis, and frequent collaborator Laney Stewart for her fourth studio album Exposed (2000). Production on the track was overseen by Stewart. Moore reportedly recorded the song in one take. In 2013, she commented in an interview: "I was very genuine when I sang that song. I sang it one time through and, burst out laughing at the end and never recorded it again." With the original version making use of the word "Nigga," two further versions with slightly different lyrics were also recorded however.

== Critical reception ==
"Bitter" earned largely positive reviews from critics. Chuck Taylor from Billboard called "Bitter" by "far the best song" on its parent album Exposed, citing it as a return to Moore's "signature sound – from the wondrous whispering vocals to the slow, simple music track." Vibe described the song as "a moving testament that invokes Minnie Riperton's phrasings," while PopMatters editor Charlotte Robinson found that "Bitter" was particularly "great" because it was containing "engaging, unusual lyrics [...] with the music of a sappy love song." Entertainment Weekly's Craig Seymour noted that Moore "forgoes contemporary R&B histrionics on "Bitter," instead dismissing a lover with cool civility." The Morning Call called the song "a brutally frank 'leave me alone' ballad."

== Music video ==
A music video for "Bitter" was directed by Aaron Courseault. A continuation of the video for "Contagious" (2001), her collaboration with The Isley Brothers, R. Kelly makes a cameo appearance in "Bitter."

== Track listings ==
US promo single

1. "Bitter" (radio edit) – 3:12
2. "Bitter" (LP version) – 3:12
3. "Bitter" (instrumental) – 3:12
4. "Bitter" (a cappella) – 3:10

== Credits and personnel ==
Credits lifted from the liner notes of Exposed.

- Malik Crawford – recording
- Kevin "KD" Davis – engineering, mixing
- Chanté Moore – vocals, writer
- Laney Stewart – producer, programming, writer
- Craig Taylor – assistant engineer
- Katrina Willis – writer

== Charts ==
Weekly chart performance for "Bitter"
Chart (2001)	Peak position
US Adult R&B Songs (Billboard)	10
US Hot R&B/Hip-Hop Songs (Billboard)	55
