= I See You in a Different Light =

1999 single by Chanté Moore

Single by Chanté Moore featuring JoJo Hailey

from the album This Moment Is Mine
- Released: August 17, 1999
- Length: 4:23
- Label: Silas; MCA
- Songwriter: Diane Warren
- Producer: Guy Roche

Chanté Moore singles chronology
"Chanté's Got a Man" (1999)	"I See You in a Different Light" (1999)	"Straight Up" (2000)

"I See You in a Different Light" is a song by American singer Chanté Moore featuring JoJo Hailey from R&B duo K-Ci & JoJo. It was written by Diane Warren and recorded by Moore and Hailey for her third studio album, This Moment Is Mine (1999), while production was overseen by Guy Roche. The duet was released by Silas and MCA Records as This Moment Is Mine's second and final single on August 17, 1999, and was included on the soundtrack of Sam Raimi's sports drama film For Love of the Game (1999).

== Background ==
"I See You in a Different Light" was written by Diane Warren and produced by Guy Roche for Chanté Moore's third studio album This Moment Is Mine (1999). Warren is also credited as an executive producer on the track. The song replaced album opener "If I Gave Love" as the album's second single after singer Jennifer Lopez had released her debut single "If You Had My Love," a "nearly identical song" to worldwide success several months before. With "I See You in a Different Light" becoming a commercially less successful release, Moore later expressed her regret about backing off from their plans to release "If I Gave Love."

== Music video ==
A music video for "I See You in a Different Light," directed by Steve Willis, was filmed in September 1999. Shot at New York City's modern Ace Gallery, it features Moore and Hailey performing in Gaultier wardrobe from "eccentric rooms and hallways." Partially inspired by James Cameron's science fiction film The Abyss (1989), it was edited by Christopher Lovett and produced by Bruce Coleman for DNA, Inc, with Pixel Envy providing special effects.

== Track listing ==
All tracks written by Diane Warren and produced by Guy Roche.

CD single
No.	Title	Length
1.	"I See You in a Different Light" (radio edit)	4:06
2.	"I See You in a Different Light" (LP version)	4:21
3.	"I See You in a Different Light" (acappella)	3:56
4.	"I See You in a Different Light" (instrumental)	4:06

== Personnel ==
Personnel are lifted from the liner notes of This Moment Is Mine.

- JoJo Hailey – vocals
- Chanté Moore – vocals
- Guy Roche – production
- Diane Warren – executive production, writing

== Charts ==
Weekly chart performance for "I See You in a Different Light"
Chart (1999)	Peak position
US Hot R&B/Hip-Hop Songs (Billboard)	61
