= Straight Up (Chanté Moore song) =

2000 single by Chanté Moore

Single by Chanté Moore

from the album Exposed
- B-side: "Train of Thought"
- Released: August 2000
- Length: 3:32
- Label: MCA; Silas
- Songwriters: Bryan-Michael Cox; Jermaine Dupri; Lil' Mo
- Producer: Jermaine Dupri

Chanté Moore singles chronology
"I See You in a Different Light" (1999)	"Straight Up" (2000)	"Bitter" (2001)

Audio
- "Straight Up" on YouTube

"Straight Up" is a single by American singer-songwriter Chanté Moore, released in August 2000. It was written by R&B singer Lil' Mo and produced by Jermaine Dupri. The song served as the lead single for Chanté Moore's fourth album, Exposed (2000). "Straight Up" reached number 83 on the US Billboard Hot 100, number 22 on the Billboard Hot R&B/Hip-Hop Singles & Tracks chart, and number 11 on the UK Singles Chart. A music video directed by Bille Woodruff was created for the song.

== Track listings ==
US maxi-CD single

1. "Straight Up" (radio edit) – 3:45
2. "Straight Up" (Sunship remix vocal) – 5:27
3. "Straight Up" (Junior's remix) – 7:55

US 12-inch single

A1. "Straight Up" (radio edit) – 3:42
A2. "Straight Up" (instrumental) – 3:42
B1. "Straight Up" (extended mix) – 5:32
B2. "Straight Up" (acappella) – 3:42

UK and Australian CD single

1. "Straight Up" (radio edit) – 3:45
2. "Straight Up" (Sunship remix vocal/main mix) – 5:27
3. "Straight Up" (Junior's remix) – 7:55
4. "Straight Up" (video)

UK 12-inch single

A1. "Straight Up" (Sunship remix vocal) – 5:27
B1. "Straight Up" (Junior's remix) – 7:55
B2. "Straight Up" (radio edit) – 3:45

UK cassette single

1. "Straight Up" (radio edit) – 3:45
2. "Straight Up" (Sunship remix vocal) – 5:27

European CD single

1. "Straight Up" (radio edit) – 3:45
2. "Straight Up" (Sunship main mix) – 5:27

French CD single

1. "Straight Up" (radio edit) – 3:45
2. "Straight Up" (extended mix) – 5:34
3. "Train of Thought" – 3:51

== Charts ==
=== Weekly charts ===
Chart (2000–2001)	Peak position
Australia (ARIA)	98
Belgium (Ultratip Bubbling Under Flanders)	3
Belgium (Ultratop 50 Wallonia)	12
Europe (Eurochart Hot 100)	28
France (SNEP)	22
Ireland (IRMA)	50
Netherlands (Dutch Top 40)	36
Netherlands (Single Top 100)	37
Scotland Singles (OCC)	27
Switzerland (Schweizer Hitparade)	66
UK Singles (OCC)	11
UK Dance (OCC)	5
UK Hip Hop/R&B (OCC)	2
US Billboard Hot 100	83
US Hot R&B/Hip-Hop Songs (Billboard)	22

=== Year-end charts ===
Chart (2001)	Position
Belgium (Ultratop 50 Wallonia)	76
UK Singles (OCC)	181

== Release history ==
Region	Date	Format(s)	Label(s)	Ref(s).
United States	August 2000	Promotional 12-inch vinyl; R&B radio	MCA; Silas	
United States	September 12, 2000	Rhythm-crossover; urban radio	MCA; Silas	
Japan	November 22, 2000	CD	MCA	
United Kingdom	March 26, 2001	12-inch vinyl; CD; cassette	MCA	
Australia	April 9, 2001	CD	MCA; Silas	
