= Precious (Chanté Moore album) =

Studio album by Chanté Moore
- Released: September 29, 1992
- Recorded: 1991–1992
- Length: 64:14
- Labels: Silas; MCA
- Producers: Vassal Benford; George Duke; Lee "Patches" Hamblin; Simon Law; Laney Stewart; BeBe Winans

Chanté Moore chronology
| Precious (1992) | A Love Supreme (1994) |

Singles from Precious
- 1. "Love's Taken Over" Released: July 28, 1992; 2. "It's Alright" Released: January 23, 1993; 3. "As If We Never Met" Released: May 18, 1993; 4. "Who Do I Turn To" Released: July 27, 1993

Precious is the debut studio album by American singer Chanté Moore. It was released by Silas Records and MCA Records on September 29, 1992, in the United States. Moore began recording Precious following the shelving of her unreleased Warner Bros. Records project, involving production from Simon Law, BeBe Winans, Laney Stewart, Vassal Benford, and George Duke. The track "Candlelight and You," a duet with Keith Washington, first appeared on the soundtrack to the 1991 film House Party 2.

The album received generally favorable reviews, with critics praising Moore's smooth soprano, songwriting, and blend of soul and jazz influences, though some felt the pop arrangements limited her vocal potential. Commercially, Precious performed well commercially, reaching number 20 on the US Top R&B/Hip-Hop Albums chart and number 101 on the US Billboard 200. A slow but consistent seller, the album was certified Gold by the Recording Industry Association of America (RIAA) for shipments exceeding 500,000 copies.

Several singles were released from Precious through Silas Records to promote the album. The lead single, "Love's Taken Over," was issued on July 28, 1992, and reached number 86 on the US Billboard Hot 100 and number 13 on the Hot R&B/Hip-Hop Songs chart. Follow-up singles included "It's Alright," "Who Do I Turn To," and "As If We Never Met," with "It's Alright" and "Who Do I Turn To" also making an impact on the R&B chart, while "Who Do I Turn To" was the only additional single to chart.

== Background ==
Encouraged by her then-boyfriend to pursue a professional music career, Moore caught the attention of talent manager Benny Medina and signed with Warner Bros. Records at the age of 19. Although she began working on an album titled Listen to My Song, the project was shelved late in its development, and she was eventually released from the label. In February 1991, after A&R director Madeleine Randolph shared several of Moore's demos from the shelved sessions, she was offered a deal with Silas Records, a new imprint founded by MCA executive Louis Silas Jr. and backed by MCA. As the label's first signed artist, Moore quickly began work on her debut solo album, featuring production from Simon Law, BeBe Winans, Laney Stewart, Vassal Benford, and George Duke, some of whom would become frequent collaborators. That same year, in October, her duet with R&B singer Keith Washington, "Candlelight and You," was featured on the soundtrack for the MCA-backed comedy film House Party 2.

== Promotion ==
Silas Records issued several singles in support of the album. "Love's Taken Over" was released as Precious's lead single on July 28, 1992. The song peaked at number eighty-six and number thirteen on the US Billboard Hot 100 and the US Hot R&B/Hip-Hop Songs, respectively. A second single, "It's Alright," failed to make impact on the Billboard Hot 100, but peaked at number thirteen on the Hot R&B/Hip-Hop Songs chart. Two further singles were subsequently released from the album, including "Who Do I Turn to" and "As If We Never Met," though only the former managed to chart.

== Critical reception ==
Professional ratings
Review scores
| Source | Rating |
|---|---|
| AllMusic | 3/5 stars |
| Artistdirect | 2/5 stars |
| Rolling Stone | 4/5 stars |

Rolling Stone's Michael Eric Dyson wrote that on Precious, "ranging from the exhilarating stride she measures on the title track to the infectious groove of "Who Do I Turn To," Moore explores the sweet entanglements of contemporary love with a supple soprano that floats over and into songs [...] Moore's superb singing and writing will unquestionably win her a satisfied audience." Billboard described the album as "a collection of soul-satisfying, jazz-inflected tunes" and further noted that the "singer's light but supple soprano floats like a breeze but delivers maximum emotional intensity." In a review of her June 1992 concert at the Henry Fonda Theatre, Los Angeles Times critic Dennis Hunt commented on the album: "Nearly all her material, mostly from her 1992 debut album, Precious, is beneath her talents and her band, handcuffed by woefully pop-ish arrangements, did nothing more than weigh the material down with pedestrian pop trimmings. In person she showed she can sing with much more fire than on the album." AllMusic rated the album three out of five stars.

== Chart performance ==
Precious debuted on Billboard's US Top R&B/Hip-Hop Albums in the week of October 24, 1992. It spent 61 weeks on the chart and eventually peaked at number 20 on the March 20, 1993. The same week, the album also peaked at number 101 on the US Billboard 200, having previously debuted on January 30, 1993. On November 14, 1994, Precious was certified gold by the Recording Industry Association of America (RIAA) for shipments figures in excess of 500,000 copies.

== Track listing ==
Precious track listing
| No. | Title | Writer(s) | Producer(s) | Length |
|---|---|---|---|---|
| 1. | "Love's Taken Over" | Chanté Moore; Simon Law | Lee "Patches" Hamblin; Law | 6:39 |
| 2. | "Precious" | Carol Duboc; Darrell Smith | George Duke | 5:52 |
| 3. | "It's Alright" | Moore; Vassal Benford | Benford | 5:37 |
| 4. | "Finding My Way Back to You" | Darryl Ross; Dianne Quander | Duke | 4:51 |
| 5. | "Listen to My Song" | Moore; Jay Lincoln | Duke | 5:30 |
| 6. | "As If We Never Met" | Jud Friedman | Duke | 3:25 |
| 7. | "Candlelight and You" (featuring Keith Washington) | Moore; Phillip L. Stewart II; Tony Haynes | Laney Stewart | 5:19 |
| 8. | "Who Do I Turn To" | Moore; Stewart II; Haynes | Stewart | 4:42 |
| 9. | "I Wanna Love (Like That Again)" | Moore; Michael J. Powell; Vernon Fails | Duke | 5:07 |
| 10. | "Sexy Thang" | Moore; Rodney Fareed Purdy | Duke | 5:46 |
| 11. | "Because You're Mine" | BeBe Winans | Winans | 4:24 |
| 12. | "Love's Taken Over" (Quiet Storm Mix) | Moore; Law | Patches; Law | 6:40 |
| Total length: | | | | 64:15 |

== Personnel ==
Credits adapted from the liner notes of Precious.

Musicians

- Gerald Albright – saxophone
- Ross Anderson – bass, guitar
- Harvey Brough – string arrangements
- Cedric Caldwell – keyboards, arrangements
- Victor Caldwell – bass, synthesizer
- Stanley Clarke – acoustic bass
- George Del Barrio – string arrangements
- Gary Barnacle – saxophone
- Everette Harp – saxophone
- Paul Jackson Jr. – guitar
- Paulinho Da Costa – percussion
- Brian R. Kilgore – percussion
- Jeff Scantlebury – percussion
- Eugene Wilde – backing vocals
- Keith Washington – featured vocals
- Freddy Washington – bass
- Kirk Whalum – tenor saxophone
- BeBe Winans – backing vocals

Technical

- Judi A. Acosta – project coordinator
- Kevin Becka – assistant engineer (mixing)
- Corine Duke – production assistant coordinator
- Linda Carr – production assistant coordinator
- Tracy Chisholm – assistant engineer (recording)
- Kevin Fisher – assistant engineer (recording)
- Victor Flores – recording engineer, mixing engineer
- Lee Hamblin – recording engineer
- Marty Hornberg – recording engineer
- Kuk – recording engineer
- Jeff Lorenzo – recording engineer
- Kimm Jones – assistant engineer
- Pat McDougal – assistant engineer
- Shawn McLean – assistant engineer
- Alan Myerson – mixing engineer
- David Parker – assistant engineer
- Eric Rudd – assistant engineer (strings)
- Dave Way – mixing engineer, recording engineer
- Erik Zobler – recording engineer, mixing engineer

== Charts ==
Weekly chart performance for Precious
| Chart (1992) | Peak position |
|---|---|
| US Billboard 200 | 101 |
| US Heatseekers Albums (Billboard) | 19 |
| US Top R&B/Hip-Hop Albums (Billboard) | 20 |

== Certifications ==
Certifications for Precious
| Region | Certification | Certified units/sales |
|---|---|---|
| United States (RIAA) | Gold | 500,000^{^} |
^{^} Shipments figures based on certification alone.

== Release history ==
Release dates and formats for Precious
| Country | Date | Format |
|---|---|---|
| United States | September 29, 1992 | CD; Cassette; Vinyl |
