= Chanté's Got a Man =

1999 single by Chanté Moore

Single by Chanté Moore

from the album This Moment Is Mine
- B-side: "Your Home Is in My Heart (Stella's Love Theme)"
- Released: May 4, 1999
- Length: 4:22
- Label: Silas; MCA
- Songwriters: James Harris III; George Jackson; Terry Lewis; Chanté Moore; James Wright
- Producers: Jimmy Jam and Terry Lewis; Big Jim

Chanté Moore singles chronology
"Satisfy You" (1995)	"Chanté's Got a Man" (1999)	"I See You in a Different Light" (1999)

"Chanté's Got a Man" is a song by American singer Chanté Moore. It was written by Moore, Big Jim Wright, and duo Jimmy Jam and Terry Lewis for her third studio album, This Moment Is Mine (1999). The song features an interpolation of the 1971 Osmonds song "One Bad Apple," written by George Jackson. Released as the album's lead single, it became Moore's first top-10 single on the US Billboard Hot 100, peaking at number 10, while also reaching number two on the Hot R&B Singles & Tracks chart.

== Accolades ==
The song earned a Soul Train Music Award nomination for Best R&B/Soul Single – Female at the 2000 Soul Train Music Awards as well as an NAACP Image Award nomination for Outstanding Song. "Chanté's Got a Man" also received a Best R&B/Soul Single, Solo nomination at the 1999 Soul Train Lady of Soul Awards.

== Music video ==
A music video for "Chanté's Got a Man" was directed by Darren Grant and Prentice Sinclair Smith. En Vogue member Terry Ellis appears as one of Chanté Moore's friends in the video.

== Track listing ==
US CD and cassette single
No.	Title	Writer(s)	Producer(s)	Length
1.	"Chanté's Got a Man"	Chanté Moore; James Harris III; Terry Lewis; George Jackson	Jimmy Jam & Terry Lewis	4:25
2.	"Your Home Is in My Heart (Stella's Love Theme)" (with Boyz II Men)	Harris; Lewis	Jimmy Jam & Terry Lewis	4:23

Sample credits

- "Chanté's Got a Man" embodies portions from "One Bad Apple (Don't Spoil the Whole Bunch)" as written by George Jackson.

== Credits and personnel ==
- James Harris III – writer
- George Jackson – writer (sample)
- Terry Lewis – producer, writer
- Chanté Moore – producer, writer
- Louil Silas Jr. – executive producer

== Charts ==
=== Weekly charts ===
Weekly chart performance for "Chanté's Got a Man"
Chart (1999)	Peak position
US Billboard Hot 100	10
US Dance Club Songs (Billboard)	34
US Hot R&B/Hip-Hop Songs (Billboard)	2
US Rhythmic Airplay (Billboard)	36

=== Year-end charts ===
Year-end chart performance for "Chanté's Got a Man"
Chart (1999)	Position
US Billboard Hot 100	71
US Hot R&B/Hip-Hop Singles & Tracks (Billboard)	11

== Certifications ==
Certifications and sales for "Chanté's Got a Man"
Region	Certification	Certified units/sales
United States (RIAA)	Gold	500,000

== Release history ==
Release dates and formats for Chanté's Got a Man"
Region	Date	Format(s)	Label(s)	Ref.
United States	March 22, 1999	Urban radio	Silas; MCA	
United States	May 4, 1999	CD; cassette	Silas; MCA	
