= Chanté Moore =

American singer, songwriter, record producer and author (born 1967)

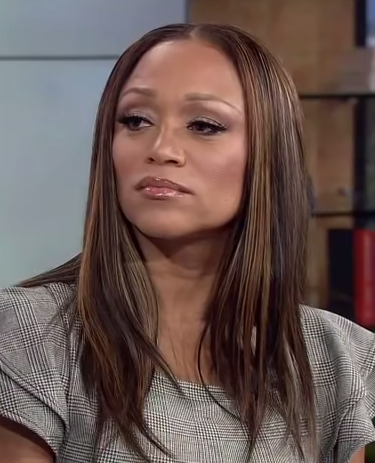
- Moore in 2018
- Born: Chanté Torrane Moore; February 17, 1967 (age 59); San Francisco, California, U.S.
- Occupations: Singer; songwriter; television personality; author
- Years active: 1986–present
- Spouses: Kadeem Hardison (m. 1997; div. 2000) Kenny Lattimore (m. 2002; div. 2011) Stephen G. Hill (m. 2022)
- Children: 2
- Awards: Full list
- Musical career
- Genres: R&B; soul; jazz; gospel
- Instrument: Vocals
- Labels: Silas; MCA; Arista; LaFace; Zomba; Peak; Concord; Shanachie
- Website: chantemoore.com

Chanté Torrane Moore (born February 17, 1967) is an American singer, songwriter, record producer, television personality, and author. The first signee with record executive Louis Silas, Jr.'s Silas Records, she rose to prominence with her debut studio album, Precious (1992). Its first two singles "Love's Taken Over" and "It's Alright" became top 20 hits on the R&B charts, while the album reached Gold status in the United States. In the late 1990s, Moore achieved crossover success with her top ten hit "Chanté's Got a Man," the lead single from her third album This Moment Is Mine (1999), before adopting a new image with hip hop-inflected sounds on Exposed (2000) and its international top 20 hit "Straight Up."

In the mid-2000s, following her departure from Silas Records, Moore released two collaborative albums, Things That Lovers Do (2003) and Uncovered/Covered (2006), with her then-husband Kenny Lattimore. She has since released four further solo albums, Love the Woman (2008), Moore Is More (2013), The Rise of the Phoenix (2017), and Christmas Back to You (2017), to varying commercial success, with "Real One" being her latest top ten hit on the US Adult R&B Songs chart. Aside from her success in music, Moore became a television personality in 2013, being involved in TV One's reality series R&B Divas: Los Angeles for three seasons. In 2014, she released her autobiographical self-help book Will I Marry Me?

Moore has sold more than ten million albums worldwide, and won the 2002 Soul Train Music Award for Best R&B/Soul Single – Group, Band or Duo for her work on "Contagious," a Grammy Award-nominated collaboration with The Isley Brothers and R. Kelly. She has also won an American Music Award and has been nominated for two additional Soul Train Awards, three NAACP Image Awards, a Soul Train Lady of Soul Award, and a Stellar Award. Divorced from actor Kadeem Hardison and singer Kenny Lattimore, Moore has been married to former BET executive Stephen G. Hill since 2022.

== Early life ==
Chanté Torrane Moore was born on February 17, 1967, in San Francisco, to Christian Evangelist parents Larry Moore, a minister, and Virginia Moore. She is the younger sister of LaTendre Moore and Kelvin Gomillion. Initially raised in San Francisco, the family moved to San Diego when Moore was twelve years old. Rooted in gospel music, she grew up singing in church and later joined the choir. Heavily influenced by the music of George Duke and Lee Ritenour, Moore enjoyed singing from an early age, but her ambitions were initially held back by her family, in which all members sang or played instruments or even had careers as professional musicians.

At the age of 14, Moore began participating in beauty pageants. Through her participation in the Miss Bronze America contest, she met Kiki Shepard and her mother, who took her under their wings and persuaded her to pursue a modeling career during her highschool years, though her height prevented Moore from pursuing a career as a professional model later on. It wasn't until a teacher asked her, at the age of 16, to take on the lead role of Dorothy in a college production of the musical The Wiz that her family recognized her singing talent and she felt confident enough to consider a career as a musician. Motivated by her then-boyfriend, she began writing songs and recording demos. Through Darryl Sutton, founder of the gospel/hip-hop label Reap Records, Moore came into contact with talent manager Benny Medina's assistant, who in turn connected her with Medina.

== Career ==
=== 1986–1995: Debut album Precious, breakthrough and A Love Supreme ===
Impressed by her demo, Medina signed Moore to Warner Bros. Records at the age of 19. He enlisted Jay King to work with her and though they recorded an entire album in Sacramento, titled Listen to My Song, for the label, the project was shelved late into the production and Moore was eventually dropped. After a Los Angeles stage production with singer El DeBarge, his manager Fred Moultrie offered Moore to represent her after she had asked him if he could recommend her. With a condensed Listen to My Song serving as her demo, he pitched her to various record labels, including LaFace Records and MCA Records. In February 1991, Moore signed with MCA through executive Louis Silas, Jr.'s newly founded Silas Records, a joint venture with MCA, after A&R director Madeleine Randolph had presented him several demos from her Listen to My Song sessions. Silas Records' first signee, she immediately began recording her solo debut album.

In October 1991, "Candlelight and You," a duet which Moore had recorded with R&B singer Keith Washington for her debut was placed on the MCA-produced soundtrack for the comedy film House Party 2. On September 29, 1992, Silas Records released Moore's debut album, Precious. The album featured production from Simon Law, Bebe Winans, George Duke, among others, and peaked at number one-hundred and one on the U.S. Billboard 200 albums chart. The first single, "Love's Taken Over" peaked at number eighty-six and number thirteen on the Billboard Hot 100 and R&B Singles charts, respectively. The album's second single, It's Alright failed to make impact on the Billboard Hot 100, however, peaking at number thirteen on the R&B charts. More singles from Precious were released in 1993, including "As If We Never Met" and "Who Do I Turn To?". The album was certified gold by the RIAA on November 14, 1994.

On November 15, 1994, Moore released her second album A Love Supreme which peaked at sixty-four on the Billboard 200 albums chart. Moore was one of the co-executive producers of the album and co-wrote eight of its songs, along with Fred Moultrie. The album's first single, "Old School Lovin'", peaked at number nineteen on the R&B chart, marking her third top 20 R&B song. Three more songs were released from the album: "This Time" (1994), "I'm What You Need" (1995) and "Free/Sail On" (1995). In 1995, Moore appeared on the soundtrack to the hit film Waiting to Exhale and featured on five tracks, performing a solo on "Wey U," and adding backing vocals on the hit single, "Count On Me."

=== 1996–2002: This Moment Is Mine and Exposed ===
In 1998, Moore collaborated with Boyz II Men on the song "Your Home Is In My Heart" from the soundtrack to the romantic comedy-drama film How Stella Got Her Groove Back (1998). Released the album soundtrack's second single, it charted in Australia and the Netherlands. In 1999, she released her third album This Moment Is Mine. Moore worked with duo Jimmy Jam & Terry Lewis on most of the album's material, while additional production was provided by Rodney Jerkins, Jermaine Dupri, and Simon Law. This Moment Is Mine was met with positive reviews, and peaked at number 31 on the US Billboard 200 and number seven on the Top R&B/Hip-Hop Albums chart, becoming Moore's first top ten entry on the chart. The album's lead single "Chanté's Got a Man," written for then-husband Kadeem Hardison, became a crossover success and scored Moore her first top ten hit on the US Billboard Hot 100 chart. The song later reached Gold status in the United States.

Just 18 months after This Moment Is Mine, MCA released Moore's fourth studio album Exposed in November 2000. While the singer considered the album a continuation of "Chanté's Got a Man," it marked a musical shift for her, taking her sound further into the contemporary R&B and urban pop genres, with Jermaine Dupri taking of executive producer duties. Although MCA had hoped the album would mark Moore's across-the-board breakthrough, it charted lower than its predecessor, peaking at number 10 on the US Top R&B/Hip-Hop Albums chart. Lead single "Straight Up" however, became her highest-charting international success yet, reaching the top twenty in Belgium and the United Kingdom. Promotion of the album's second single "Bitter" was interlinked with "Contagious," a 2001 collaboration with R. Kelly and The Isley Brothers. It became a top 20 hit on the US Billboard Hot 100 and won the Soul Train Music Award for Best R&B/Soul Single – Group, Band or Duo.

=== 2003–2007: Duet albums with Kenny Lattimore: Things That Lovers Do and Covered/Uncovered ===
A year after marrying R&B singer Kenny Lattimore, the pair signed as a duet act to Arista Records and began recording a duet cover album titled Things That Lovers Do, consisting of cover versions of classic 1970's and 1980's soul duets by singers such as Karyn White and Babyface. Released in February 2003, the album was promoted with a stageplay named after it. Directed by George Faison and co-starring actors Kym Whitley and Clifton Powell, the stage show saw them touring from January through March 2003. Whilte the album earned polarizing reviews, Things That Lovers Do, with first week sales of 47,000 units, became the highest-charting project for both singers.

In fall 2006, Moore and Lattimore issued a follow-up to Things That Lovers Do, a double album of gospel and R&B love songs titled Uncovered/Covered. The set was led off by dual singles, the Bryan-Michael Cox-produced "Figure It Out," and "Make Me Like the Moon," a gospel ballad that was co-written by Lattimore and Moore and produced by Fred Hammond. Released via LaFace Records and Verity Records, Uncovered/Covered reached number two on the US Top Gospel Albums and number ten on the US Top R&B/Hip-Hop Albums chart and earned Moore and Lattimore a Stellar Award nomination for Best Contemporary Group/Duo of the Year. Also in 2007, Moore starred in the gospel stageplay By Any Means Necessary, along with Dave Hollister, Tisha Campbell-Martin, Shar Jackson, and Danielle Mone Truitt.

=== 2008–2015: Love the Woman, Moore Is More and R&B Divas ===
While recording her duet album with Lattimore, Moore signed a new solo recording contract with Peak Records, a subsidiary of the Concord Music Group. Her first project with the label, her fifth solo album, Love the Woman, was released in June 2008, involving production from Warryn Campbell, Raphael Saadiq, Antonio Dixon, and longtime collaborator George Duke, among others. The album earned largely mixed reviews from music critics and peaked at number 15 on the US Top R&B/Hip-Hop Albums chart, selling more than 25,000 copies in its first five months of release. Its only single, "Ain't Supposed to Be This Way," reached number 21 on the US Adult R&B Songs chart.

In May 2009, Moore set some dates for a Love the Woman tour, with performances in Los Angeles, and Atlanta, Georgia. The same month, she starred with James Pickens, Jr., Vickie Winans, Loretta Devine, Reginald VelJohnson, Rocky Carroll and Lattimore in a live stage production of Otis Sallid's Gospel! Gospel! Gospel at the Los Angeles Wilshire Ebell Theater. In 2012, Moore performed at the BET Awards in a tribute to the late singer Donna Summer. In January 2013, the singer signed a new recording deal with Shanachie Entertainment. She released her sixth studio solo album Moore Is More on July 30. Her first album in five years, it was preceded by the single "Talking in My Sleep" but became her lowest-charting effort yet.

Also in 2013, Moore joined the cast of the reality TV One reality television series R&B Divas: Los Angeles, a spinoff to R&B Divas: Atlanta, along with Kelly Price, Dawn Robinson, Michel'le Toussaint, Lil' Mo, and Claudette Ortiz. In March 2014, it was announced that Moore would appear in a limited run of the revue Jubilee! at Bally's Las Vegas. Directed by Frank Gatson Jr. and co-starring Luke James, the show received lukewarm reviews, though Moore herself earned favorable reviews from critics. In July 2014, coinciding with the second season premiere of R&B Divas: Los Angeles, Moore released the standalone single, "I Know, Right?." followed by the August 2014 released of her self-help book Will I Marry Me?, which was adapted into a one-woman show with the same title the following year. The third and final season of R&B Divas premiered in February 2015.

=== 2016–2021: The Rise of the Phoenix and Christmas Back to You ===
In 2016, Moore premiered a new track titled "Ghetto Love" featuring Kurupt on Donnie Simpson's radio show. Later in July, she appeared on the radio show to premiere her new single "Put It On Fate" of which she filmed a music video on July 13.

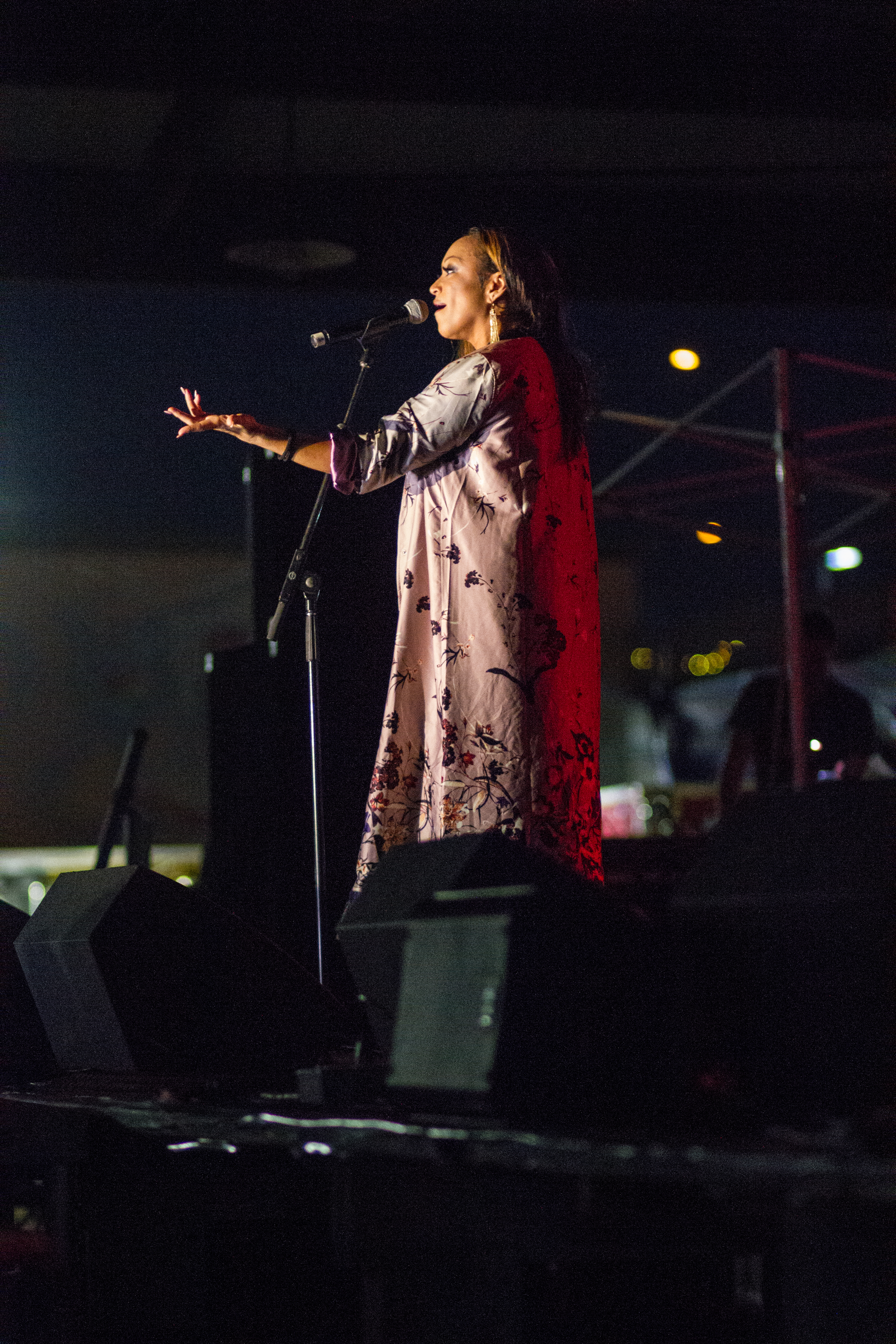
Moore at the 2018 Let the Good Times Roll Festival in Shreveport, Louisiana.

In February 2017, Moore, along with Carl Anthony Payne II and LisaRaye McCoy, began touring with and co-starring in Je'Caryous Johnson's off-Broadway play Married But Single Too. The same month, she released "Real One," the lead single off her seventh studio album The Rise of the Phoenix, her debut on her own record label CM7 Records. The song proved to be her most successful single in seventeen years, peaking at number 10 on the US Adult R&B Songs chart and at number 39 on the US R&B/Hip-Hop Airplay chart. Released to streaming services on September 8, 2018, followed by a digital and physical release the weeks after, The Rise of the Phoenix, chiefly produced by Lil' Ronnie, earned positive reviews from critics, and peaked at number 24 on the US R&B Album Sales chart.

Also in 2017, Moore released her first full-length Christmas album titled Christmas Back to You. Again featuring main production from Lil' Ronnie, the project comprises five original songs and six cover versions of Christmas standards and carols. In March 2018, Moore premiered the single "One Love," featuring Lewis Sky, ahead of a new EP, 1 of 4, released on April 5. Including guest appearances from Sky, Felly the Voice, D. Bryant, and girl band June's Diary, the EP was the first project to be released as part of a four-EP series, but while Moore released another single from the project, "Fresh Love," in 2019, the series was eventually discontinued and plans, to release all four parts on one album were shelved. In September 2021, Moore released the standalone single "Right One", which she co-wrote alongside Eric and Jovan Dawkins.

=== 2022–present: Ninth studio album and Singer 2024 in China ===
In November 2022, celebrating the 30th anniversary of her debut album Precious (1992), Moore performed a medley, consisting of "Love's Taken Over", "It's Alright" and "Chanté's Got a Man," at the 2022 Soul Train Music Awards, to rave reviews. In January 2023, P Music Group announced that Moore had signed with the label. In June 2023, she was a part of Babyface's Tiny Desk concert ensemble, along with Avery Wilson and Tank. The following month, Moore announced that she had started work on her ninth studio album Evolve, involving previous collaborators such as Laney Stewart, Tricky Stewart, Babyface, and Simon Law, as well as Jimmy Jam & Terry Lewis.

Between May and July 2024, Moore participated in the ninth season of the Chinese reality show Singer 2024, a singing competition for professional singers. The first R&B vocalist to compete on the singing competition, she made it to the show's final but did not advance to its second round, earning her a joint fifth place. Broadcast to up to 250 million viewers, Moore took the opportunity to play concerts in several stadiums throughout the country after the show ended. In August 2024, she appeared on "So Distracted," a duet with Eric Benét's from his EP Duets. Released as the extended play's second single, it became Moore's highest-charting single since 1999's "Chanté's Got a Man," reaching number 17 on the US R&B/Hip-Hop Airplay chart, while also topping the US Adult R&B Songs chart, becoming Moore's first song to do so.

== Personal life ==
During the production of her shelved debut album with Warner Bros. Records, Moore became romantically involved with Jay King of R&B group Club Nouveau. Producer Brian Alexander Morgan, who had worked with them on Listen to My Song, was inspired to compose the song "Weak" about their relationship, and his own secret crush on Moore. In 1991, Moore married a friend from her childhood. In her 2014 autobiographical self-help book, Will I Marry Me?, she publicly revealed this marriage (and subsequent divorce), stating that the two had dated in sixth grade.

In 1993, Moore met actor Kadeem Hardison at a party. The two later began dating after they were chosen to present together at the 25th NAACP Image Awards. In 1996, Moore and Hardison welcomed a daughter named Sophia Milan Hardison. The pair secretly married in 1997 and divorced in 2000. Moore married singer Kenny Lattimore in a private ceremony in Jamaica on New Year's Day in 2002. Their son was born in 2003. On July 27, 2011, in a statement on her Facebook page, Moore announced that she and Lattimore had divorced. Her older brother Kelvin Gomillion (born January 25, 1961) died on August 18, 2013. On October 26, 2021, Moore announced her engagement to former BET Executive, Stephen G. Hill. The couple wed in Los Cabos, Mexico on October 22, 2022.

== Discography ==
Solo albums

- Precious (1992)
- A Love Supreme (1994)
- This Moment Is Mine (1999)
- Exposed (2000)
- Love the Woman (2008)
- Moore Is More (2013)
- The Rise of the Phoenix (2017)
- Christmas Back to You (2017)

Collaborative albums

- Things That Lovers Do (2003)
- Uncovered/Covered (2006)

== Awards and nominations ==
Name of the award ceremony, with selected details
| Award | Year (Note: Indicates the year of ceremony. Each year is linked to the article about the awards held that year, wherever possible.) | Category | Recipient(s) | Result | Ref. |
|---|---|---|---|---|---|
| American Music Awards | 1997 | Top Soundtrack | Waiting to Exhale: OST | Won | |
| MCP Music Awards | 2017 | Female R&B Performance of the Year | "Something to Remember" | Nominated | |
| MCP Music Awards | 2017 | Indie R&B Album of the Year | The Rise of the Phoenix | Nominated | |
| MCP Music Awards | 2017 | Comeback of the Year | "Real One" | Nominated | |
| NAACP Image Awards | 1996 | Outstanding Album | Waiting to Exhale: OST | Won | |
| NAACP Image Awards | 2000 | Outstanding Song | "Chanté's Got a Man" | Nominated | |
| NAACP Image Awards | 2002 | Outstanding Music Video | "Contagious" | Nominated | |
| Lady of Soul Awards | 1999 | Best R&B/Soul Single, Solo | "Chanté's Got a Man" | Nominated | |
| Soul Train Music Awards | 2000 | Best R&B/Soul Single – Female | "Chanté's Got a Man" | Nominated | |
| Soul Train Music Awards | 2002 | Best R&B/Soul Single – Group, Band or Duo | "Contagious" | Won | |
| Soul Train Music Awards | 2002 | Best Video of the Year | "Contagious" | Nominated | |
| Stellar Awards | 2008 | Contemporary Group/Duo of the Year | Chanté Moore and Kenny Lattimore | Nominated | |
| UB Honors | 2013 | Best Independent R&B Album Release of 2013 | Moore is More | Won | |
| UB Honors | 2017 | Best Artist Return Single | "Real One" | Nominated | |
