= Love's Taken Over =

Single by Chanté Moore

from the album Precious
- Released: July 28, 1992
- Length: 6:40
- Label: Silas; MCA
- Songwriters: Chanté Moore; Simon Law
- Producers: Simon Law; Lee Hamblin

Chanté Moore singles chronology
"Love's Taken Over" (1992)	"It's Alright" (1993)

"Love's Taken Over" is a song by American singer Chanté Moore's debut album, Precious (1992). It was written by Moore and Simon "The Funky Ginger" Law, and produced by Law and Lee "Patches" Hamblin. Selected as Precious's lead single, it was released by Silas and MCA on July 28, 1992 in the United States. The song entered the top ten of the US R&B/Hip-Hop Airplay chart and peaked at number 13 on the US Billboard Hot R&B Singles chart, spending 33 weeks on the listing. The accompanying music video was directed by Antoine Fuqua and filmed in Paris. Fuqua and Moore had previously worked on the visuals for El DeBarge's 1992 single "You Know What I Like," which features Moore's vocals.

== Track listing ==
12" single
No.	Title	Length
1.	"Love's Taken Over" (extended vocal)	8:05
2.	"Love's Taken Over" (instrumental)	5:48
3.	"Love's Taken Over" (quiet storm mix)	6:34

== Credits and personnel ==
Credits lifted from the liner notes of Precious.

- Lee "Patches" Hamblin – producer
- Simon Law – producer, writer
- Chanté Moore – vocal arranger, vocals, writer
- Fred Moultrie – executive producer
- Louis Silas, Jr. – executive producer

== Charts ==
=== Weekly charts ===
Weekly chart performance for Love's Taken Over"
Chart (1992)	Peak position
UK Singles (OCC)	54
UK Club Chart (Music Week)	100
US Billboard Hot 100	86
US Hot R&B/Hip-Hop Songs (Billboard)	13

=== Year-end charts ===
Year-end chart performance for "Love's Taken Over"
Chart (1993)	Position
US Hot R&B/Hip-Hop Songs (Billboard)	47

== Release history ==
Release dates and formats for "Love's Taken Over"
Region	Date	Format(s)	Label(s)	Ref.
United States	July 28, 1992	12-inch vinyl; cassette	MCA; Silas	
United Kingdom	March 8, 1993	12-inch vinyl; CD; cassette	MCA; Silas	
