= It's Alright (Chanté Moore song) =

Single by Chanté Moore

from the album Precious
- Released: January 23, 1993
- Length: 4:24
- Label: Silas; MCA
- Songwriters: Chanté Moore; Vassal Benford
- Producer: Vassal Benford

Chanté Moore singles chronology
"Love's Taken Over" (1992)	"It's Alright" (1993)	"Who Do I Turn To?" (1993)

"It's Alright" is a song by American singer Chanté Moore. It was written by Moore and Vassal Benford for her debut studio album, Precious (1992), and produced by Benford. The song was released by Silas and MCA Records on January 23, 1993 as the album's second single. Like the previous single "Love's Taken Over", the song peaked at number 13 on the US Billboard Hot R&B Singles chart.

== Music video ==
Moore reteamed with Antoine Fuqua, director of her debut single "Love's Taken Over," to film a music video for "It's Alright."

== Track listing ==
12" single
No.	Title	Writer(s)	Producer(s)	Length
1.	"It's Alright" (extended vocal version)	Chanté Moore; Vassal Benford	Benford; Louis Silas, Jr.^{[a]}	5:53
2.	"It's Alright" (hip hop vocal vibe)	Moore; Benford	Benford; Silas^{[a]}	5:44
3.	"Love's Taken Over" (DJ Jam's hip hop remix)	Chanté Moore; Simon Law	Law; Lee "Patches" Hamblin; DJ Jam^{[a]}	5:54

Notes

- ^{^a} denotes a remix producer

== Credits and personnel ==
Credits lifted from the liner notes of Precious.

- Vassal Benford – arranger, producer, writer
- Chanté Moore – vocal arranger, vocals, writer
- Fred Moultrie – executive producer
- Louis Silas, Jr. – executive producer, vocal co-producer

== Charts ==
=== Weekly charts ===
Weekly chart performance for "It's Alright"
Chart (1993)	Peak position
US Bubbling Under Hot 100 (Billboard)	8
US Hot R&B/Hip-Hop Songs (Billboard)	13
US Maxi-Singles Sales (Billboard)	33

=== Year-end charts ===
Year-end chart performance for "It's Alright"
Chart (1993)	Position
US Hot R&B/Hip-Hop Songs (Billboard)	81
