= Dawkins & Dawkins =

American gospel and Christian R&B music duo

- Origin: Davenport, Iowa
- Genres: Contemporary Christian music, gospel music, Christian R&B, urban contemporary gospel
- Years active: 1993–present
- Labels: A&M, Light, Harmony, Entertainment One, CGI
- Members: Anson Dawkins; Eric Dawkins
- Website: legacymusicgroups.com

Dawkins & Dawkins is an American gospel music and Christian R&B duo from Davenport, Iowa. The group consist of two brothers, Anson Dawkins and Eric Dawkins.

The first album, Dawkins & Dawkins, was released in 1993 by A&M Records. This was the only record released with the label. Their second album, Necessary Measures, was released in 1994 by CGI Records. Their third album, Focus, was released by Harmony Records in 1998. This album was their breakthrough release on the Billboard charts, by placing on the Gospel Albums chart. They released, From Now On, in 2011 with Light Records a division of Entertainment One Music. The album placed on the Gospel Albums chart along with the Independent Albums chart.

== Early years ==
The Davenport, Iowa-based duo, Dawkins & Dawkins, are two brothers Anson and Eric Dawkins. They were raised in the Pentecostal church by a preacher for a father and a singer of a mother. The brothers would appear at revivals while growing up with their parents ministry. Anson is a drummer and a trumpet player, while his brother is a pianist.

== Music career ==
The brother duo started making music professionally in 1993, with the release of Dawkins & Dawkins by A&M Records. This album was awarded an eight out of ten from Cross Rhythms. Their subsequent album, Necessary Measures, was released by CGI Records in 1994. The album was again awarded an eight out of ten by Cross Rhythms. They released their third album, Focus, in 1998 via Harmony Records. This album would be awarded a nine out of ten by Cross Rhythms. The album charted on the Billboard Top Gospel Albums chart at No. 10.

They would not release another album until 2011 with From Now On, which was released by Light Records, a division of Entertainment One Music. This time the album would chart on two Billboard charts the Gospel Albums at No. 4, while it placed at No. 43 on the Independent Albums chart. William Ruhlmann rated the album a three out of five stars for AllMusic.

== Members ==
- Anson Dawkins – vocals, drums, trumpet
- Eric Dawkins - vocals, piano

== Discography ==
=== Studio albums ===
List of studio albums, with selected chart positions
Title	Album details	Peak chart positions	
Title	Album details	US Gos	US Indie
Dawkins & Dawkins	Released: 1993; Label: A&M; CD, digital download	–	–
Necessary Measures	Released: 1994; Label: CGI; CD, digital download	–	–
Focus	Released: 1998; Label: Harmony; CD, digital download	10	–
From Now On	Released: July 26, 2011; Label: Light/Entertainment One; CD, digital download	4	43
