= Shanice discography =

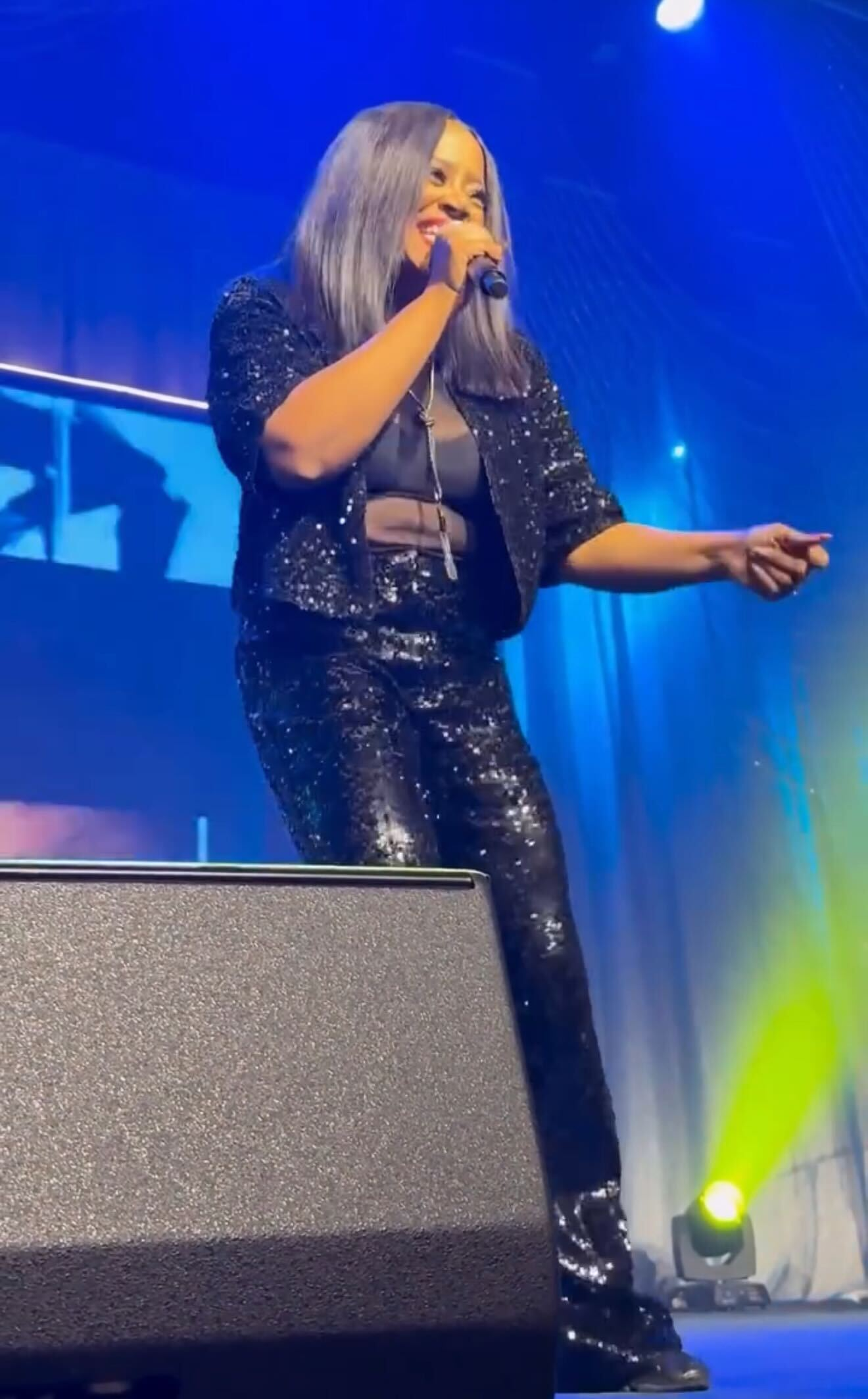
- Studio albums: 5
- Compilation albums: 2
- Singles: 32
- Music videos: 20

This article contains the discography of American singer, Shanice. This includes studio albums, compilation albums, and singles.

== Albums ==
=== Studio albums ===
List of studio albums, with selected chart positions, sales figures and certifications
Title	Album details	Peak chart positions				Certifications
Title	Album details	US	US R&B	AUS	UK	Certifications
Discovery	Released: October 21, 1987; Label: A&M	149	37	—	—	
Inner Child	Released: November 19, 1991; Label: Motown	83	13	111	21	RIAA: Gold
21... Ways to Grow	Released: June 21, 1994; Label: Motown	184	46	150	—	
Shanice	Released: March 9, 1999; Label: LaFace	56	15	—	—	
Every Woman Dreams	Released: February 21, 2006; Label: Imajah, PlayTyme	194	30	—	—	
"—" denotes items which failed to chart.

=== Compilation albums ===
List of compilation albums
Title	Album details
The Remix...	Released: March 25, 1995; Label: Motown; Format: CD, Cassette
Ultimate Collection	Released: November 16, 1999; Label: Hip-O; Format: CD

== Singles ==
=== As lead artist ===
List of singles as lead artist, with selected chart positions and certifications, showing year released and album name
Title	Year	Chart positions							Album
Title	Year	US	US R&B	US Dance	AUS	GER	SWI	UK	Album
"(Baby Tell Me) Can You Dance"	1987	50	6	16	—	—	—	—	Discovery
"No 1/2 Steppin'"	1987	—	6	19	—	—	—	—	Discovery
"The Way You Love Me"	1988	—	53	—	—	—	—	—	Discovery
"I'll Bet She's Got a Boyfriend"	1988	—	—	—	69	—	—	78	Discovery
"I Love Your Smile"	1991	2	1	—	8	2	3	2	Inner Child
"I'm Cryin'"	1992	—	11	—	140	47	—	—	Inner Child
"Silent Prayer" (featuring Johnny Gill)	1992	31	4	—	—	—	—	—	Inner Child
"Lovin' You"	1992	—	59	—	189	—	—	54	Inner Child
"Don't Wanna Love You"	1992	—	57	—	—	—	—	—	Boomerang: Original Soundtrack Album
"Saving Forever for You"	1992	4	20	—	25	58	—	42	Beverly Hills, 90210: The Soundtrack
"It's for You"	1993	57	14	—	157	—	—	—	The Meteor Man: Music from the MGM Motion Picture
"Somewhere"	1994	—	28	—	—	—	—	—	21... Ways to Grow
"Turn Down the Lights"	1994	—	21	—	—	—	—	—	21... Ways to Grow
"I Like"	1994	—	—	38	—	—	49	49	21... Ways to Grow
"I Wish"	1994	—	61	—	—	—	—	—	21... Ways to Grow
"If I Never Knew You" (duet with Jon Secada)	1995	—	—	—	128	—	—	51	Pocahontas: An Original Walt Disney Records Soundtrack
"When I Close My Eyes"	1999	12	4	—	—	—	—	—	Shanice
"Yesterday"	1999	—	40	—	—	—	—	—	Shanice
"You Need a Man"	1999	—	53	—	—	—	—	—	Shanice
"Love is the Gift"	2001	—	—	—	—	—	—	—	The Bouncer
"Every Woman Dreams"	2005	—	62	—	—	—	—	—	Every Woman Dreams
"Take Care of U"	2006	—	72	—	—	—	—	—	Every Woman Dreams
"So Sexy" (featuring Karif)	2006	—	73	—	—	—	—	—	Every Woman Dreams
"Tomorrow"	2009	—	75	—	—	—	—	—	Non-album singles
"Kryptonite"	2013	—	—	—	—	—	—	—	Non-album singles
"Gotta Blame Me"	2014	—	—	—	—	—	—	—	Non-album singles
"We Can Fly"	2014	—	—	—	—	—	—	—	Non-album singles
"Another Lonely Day in California"	2015	—	—	—	—	—	—	—	Non-album singles
"Breakdown"	2016	—	—	—	—	—	—	—	Non-album singles
"He Won't"	2019	—	—	—	—	—	—	—	Non-album singles
"Limit"	2025	—	—	—	—	—	—	—	Non-album singles
"Love at Christmas Time" (with Kenny Lattimore)	2025	—	—	—	—	—	—	—	Non-album singles

=== As featured artist ===
List of singles as featured artist, with selected chart positions and certifications, showing year released and album name
Title	Year	Chart positions				Album
Title	Year	US	US R&B	US Dance	UK	Album
"This Time" (Kiara featuring Shanice)	1988	78	2	—	81	To Change and/or Make a Difference
"Love for a While" (Jeremiah featuring Shanice)	2008	—	74	—	—	Chasing Forever

- Not released for sale in the US/Radio-only single in America (before download sales).

== Other appearances ==
=== Album appearances ===
Title	Year	Other artist(s)	Album
"This Time"	1988	Kiara	To Change and/or Make a Difference
"Christmas Presence"	1989	Gerald Alston	Christmas Cheers from Motown: Motown Christmas
"When You Believe"	1995	Crystal Wilson	Mother & Child: A Christmas Celebration of Motherhood
"Breathe Again" (Live)	1997	—	MTV Unplugged NYC 1997
"Love for a While"	2006	Jeremiah	Chasing Forever
"Behind The Mask"	2010	Michael Jackson	Michael
"Crazy (Baby)"	2011	Rahsaan Patterson and Faith Evans	Bleuphoria
"Your Love Makes Me High"	2014	Full Force and Raphael Saadiq	With Love from Our Friends
"Go to Bed"	2015	All-4-One and Debelah Morgan	Twenty+

=== Soundtrack appearances ===
Title	Year	Album
"Don't Wanna Love You"	1992	Boomerang
"Saving Forever for You"	1992	Beverly Hills 90210
"It's For You"	1993	The Meteor Man
"If I Never Knew You" (with Jon Secada)	1995	Pocahontas
"If I Were Your Woman"	1995	Panther
"Love Is the Gift"	2000	The Bouncer
"If I Jump Now"	2012	Dragon Age: Dawn of the Seeker

== Music videos ==
- "(Baby Tell Me) Can You Dance" (1987)
- "No 1/2 Steppin" (1987)
- "I'll Bet She's Got a Boyfriend" (1988)
- Kiara featuring Shanice: "This Time" (1988)
- "I Love Your Smile" (1991)
- "I'm Cryin" (1992)
- "Saving Forever for You" (1992)
- "It's for You" (1993)
- "Somewhere" (1994)
- "Turn Down the Lights" (1994)
- "I Wish" (1994)
- "I Like" (1994)
- Jon Secada & Shanice: "If I Never Knew You" (1995)
- "When I Close My Eyes" (1999)
- "Yesterday" (Unreleased) (1999)
- "You Need a Man" (1999)
- "Every Woman Dreams" (2005)
- "Take Care of U" (2006)
- Jeremiah featuring Shanice: "Chasing Forever" (2006)
- "Gotta Blame Me" (2014)
