= Ultimate Collection (Shanice album) =

Compilation album by Shanice
- Released: November 16, 1999
- Genre: R&B, pop, new jack swing
- Length: 77:43
- Label: Hip-O
- Producer: Bryan Loren; Narada Michael Walden; Hakeem Abdulsamad; Eric Daniels; Mike Mani; Bo Watson; Christopher Williams; Ike Lee III; Kiyamma Griffin; Lance Alexander & Tony Tolbert; Chris Stokes

Shanice chronology
Shanice (1999)	Ultimate Collection (1999)	Every Woman Dreams (2006)

Ultimate Collection is a compilation by thd American R&B singer Shanice, containing songs from her first three albums. The collection was released on November 16, 1999, following her fourth album Shanice, released earlier that year.

== Track listings ==
No.	Title	Writer(s)	Album	Length
1.	"Jesus Loves Me"	Anna B. Warner; William B. Bradbury	21... Ways to Grow	0:51
2.	"Keep Your Inner Child Alive (Interlude)"	Sally Jo Dakota; Narada Michael Walden	Inner Child	1:24
3.	"I Love Your Smile"	Walden; Jarvis La Rue Baker; Shanice; Sylvester Jackson	Inner Child	4:19
4.	"(Baby Tell Me) Can You Dance"	Bryan Loren	Discovery	4:49
5.	"No 1/2 Steppin'"	B. Loren	Discovery	4:56
6.	"Do I Know You"	B. Loren	Discovery	5:41
7.	"Just a Game"	B. Loren	Discovery	4:32
8.	"The Way You Love Me"	B. Loren	Discovery	4:14
9.	"Lovin' You"	Minnie Riperton; Richard Rudolph	Inner Child	3:57
10.	"I'm Cryin'"	Dakota; Walden; Shanice	Inner Child	5:03
11.	"Silent Prayer" (featuring Johnny Gill)	Walden; Jeffrey Cohen	Inner Child	5:00
12.	"You Were The One"	Shanice; Crystal Wilson; Daryl Duncan; Kataya Anderson	Inner Child	5:20
13.	"You Didn't Think I'd Come Back This Hard"	Baker; Shanice; Mani; Eric Daniels	Inner Child	3:39
14.	"Somewhere"	Shanice; Kiyamma Griffin; Ike Lee; Christopher Williams	21... Ways to Grow	4:10
15.	"I Like"	Shanice; Chris Stokes	21... Ways to Grow	4:49
16.	"I Wish"	Lance Alexander, Tony Tolbert	21... Ways to Grow	5:56
17.	"Turn Down the Lights"	Bo Watson; McArthur; Babyface	21... Ways to Grow	4:30
18.	"Never Changing Love"	Diane Warren	21... Ways to Grow	4:16

== Personnel and credits ==
Credits taken from album liner notes.

- Executive-Producer – Pat Lawrence
- Producer – Bryan Loren (track: 4, 5, 6, 7, 8) – Narada Michael Walden (track: 2, 3, 9, 10, 11, 12, 13) – Christopher Williams, Ike Lee III, Kiyamma Griffin (track: 14) – Chris Stokes (track: 15) – Lance Alexander, Tony Tolbert (track: 16) – Bo Watson, McArthur (track: 17) – Guy Roche (track: 18)
- Art Direction – Laura Graven, Vartan
- Compilation Producer – Dana G. Smart, David Nathan
- Coordinator [Project Coordination] – Laura Graven
- Design – Ryan Rogers
- Liner Notes [Essay By] – David Nathan
- Mastered By [Digitally Mastered By] – Kevin Reeves

Phonographic Copyright (p) – A&M Records, Inc. Phonographic Copyright (p) – Motown Record Company, L.P. Phonographic Copyright (p) – Universal Music Special Markets, Inc. Copyright (c) – Universal Music Special Markets, Inc. Distributed By – Universal Music & Video Distribution, Inc.
