= Every Woman Dreams (song) =

- Promo single cover

Single by Shanice

from the album Every Woman Dreams
- Released: January 26, 2006
- Length: 5:40
- Label: Imajah; PlayTyme
- Songwriter(s): Shanice Knox; Mark A. Knox; Tony Minister; Richard Garcia; Cynthia Wilson; Dominic Rodriguez; Kataya "Mookie" Anderson
- Producer(s): Shanice; PMG

Shanice singles chronology
| "You Need a Man" (1999) | "Every Woman Dreams" (2006) | "Take Care of U" (2006) |

"Every Woman Dreams" is a song by American R&B singer Shanice, released in early–2006 as the lead single from her fifth album, Every Woman Dreams (2006). It was co-written by her, along with husband Flex Alexander, and Cynthia Wilson, among others. Her first single in six years, "Every Woman Dreams" failed to chart on Billboard Hot 100; however, it peaked at number 62 on Billboard's R&B/Hip-Hop Songs chart.

== Music video ==
The music video features Shanice's husband love interest, and shows the two embracing in between shots of Shanice by herself, declaring the good man she has.

== Charts ==
Weekly chart performance for "very Woman Dreams"
| Chart (2005) | Peak position |
|---|---|
| US Hot R&B/Hip-Hop Songs (Billboard) | 62 |
