= Shanice (album) =

Studio album by Shanice
- Released: March 9, 1999
- Recorded: 1998–1999
- Genres: R&B; soul; pop
- Length: 50:53
- Labels: LaFace; Arista
- Producers: Dallas Austin; Babyface; Leslie Brathwaite; Warryn Campbell; Darren "Nitro" Clowers; Rashad Coes; Jamey Jaz; London "LDJ" Jones; Jazz Nixon; Laney Stewart

Shanice chronology
| 21... Ways to Grow (1994) | Shanice (1999) | Ultimate Collection (1999) |

Singles from Shanice
- 1. "When I Close My Eyes" Released: December 16, 1998; 2. "Yesterday" Released: July 20, 1999; 3. "You Need a Man" Released: September 7, 1999

Shanice is the fourth studio album by American singer-songwriter Shanice. It was released on March 9, 1999 on LaFace Records. Produced by Dallas Austin, Babyface, Warryn Campbell, Laney Stewart, and others, the album peaked at number 56 on the US Billboard 200 and number 15 on the Top R&B/Hip-Hop Albums chart. The lead single, "When I Close My Eyes", held the record for the biggest leap in one week on the Billboard Hot 100 (from number 91 to number 16) until 2006 and peaked at number 12 on the US Hot 100. Other singles released from the album were "Yesterday" and "You Need a Man" .

== Background ==
In June 1994, Shanice released her third studio album 21... Ways to Grow, her second project with Motown. The album was less commercially successful than her 1991 release Inner Child, peaking at number 46 on Billboard's US Top R&B/Hip-Hop Albums and at number 184 on the US Billboard 200. It produced the minor hit singles "Somewhere" and "Turn Down the Lights". Later in 1994, Shanice departed Motown and began pursuing other projects, including portraying the role of Éponine in the Broadway musical Les Misérables. She also contributed to film soundtracks, including Panther (1995) and Pocahontas (1995), and worked as a backing vocalist on several projects from other artists.

In 1997, Shanice signed with Arista Records but was later transferred to LaFace Records following collaborations with label co-founder Babyface. L.A. Reid and Babyface enlisted a range of collaborators for the project, including Dallas Austin, Warryn Campbell; Jazz Nixon, and Laney Stewart, among others. The producers encouraged Shanice to take a more active creative role, which she later said gave her "a lot of freedom" during the album’s production. She co-wrote five of the album's 13 tracks and served as an executive producer alongside Reid, Babyface, and Pete "Luv" Farmer. Shanice also recorded material with Jermaine Dupri and Daryl Simmons, though their contributions did not appear on Shanice.

== Promotion ==
"When I Close My Eyes", co-written by Tamara Savage and produced by Campbell, was shipped to US radios as the album's lead single on December 16, 1998. Though it was not made available commercially, the song made chart history when it made the biggest jump in the history of the US Billboard Hot 100, moving 75 positions from number 91 to number 16, a record held until 2006. It became Shanice's first top 20 hit since "Saving Forever for You" (1992).

== Critical reception ==
Professional ratings
Review scores
| Source | Rating |
|---|---|
| AllMusic | 2.5/5 stars |

AllMusic editor Jose F. Promis found that the singer "possesses a powerful voice to be sure, and the songs on this set are pleasant enough, but one can't help but feel that this album possesses something of an assembly-line feel [...] Shanice has a strong voice and is a talented singer, but ultimately deserves more creative songwriting and better material, because one can't help but feel that her talent is wasted on this mindless, mass-produced '90s pop-soul borderline drudge." Paul Verna from Billboard felt that the album "reflects a still-youthful but more mature approach than [Shanice] exhibited" previous releases. He noted that "despite the lack of a clear hit to set up the album, Shanice will benefit from a high- visibility campaign and other possibilities for singles."

== Commercial performance ==
Shanice peaked at number 56 on the US Billboard 200, becoming Shanice's highest-charting album to date. It also reached number 15 on Billboard's Top R&B/Hip-Hop Albums. It was her second album to reach the chart's top 20.

== Track listing ==
Shanice track listing
| No. | Title | Writer(s) | Producer(s) | Length |
|---|---|---|---|---|
| 1. | "You Need a Man" | Montell Jordan; Shanice Wilson; Danny Nixon | Jazz the Man | 3:52 |
| 2. | "When I Close My Eyes" | Warryn Campbell; Tamara Savage | Campbell | 3:22 |
| 3. | "Yesterday" | Jamey Jaz; Wilson; Shari Watson | Jaz | 3:49 |
| 4. | "Wanna Hear You Say" | Savage; Campbell; Tanya Blount | Campbell | 3:51 |
| 5. | "Fly Away" | Laney Stewart; Philip "Silky" White; Gloria Stewart; Babyface | Stewart; Babyface | 4:23 |
| 6. | "Don't Fight It" | Dallas Austin | Austin; Leslie Brathwaite | 3:40 |
| 7. | "Ain't Got No Remedy" | Babyface | Babyface | 4:56 |
| 8. | "Doin' My Thang" | Anthony Dent; Jeffrey Walker; Teron Beal | Dent; J-Dub | 3:47 |
| 9. | "Fall for You" | Babyface | Babyface | 5:26 |
| 10. | "You Can Bounce" | Rashad Coes; Wilson | Coes | 4:00 |
| 11. | "Somebody Else" | London Jones; Wilson | LDJ | 4:52 |
| 12. | "A Reason" | Darren Clowers; Wilson | Clowers | 4:55 |

Japan bonus track
| No. | Title | Writer(s) | Producer(s) | Length |
|---|---|---|---|---|
| 13. | "Dreamin'" | Babyface | Babyface | 4:01 |

== Charts ==
Chart performance for Shanice
| Chart (1999) | Peak position |
|---|---|
| US Billboard 200 | 56 |
| US Top R&B/Hip-Hop Albums (Billboard) | 15 |

== Release history ==
Shanice release history
| Region | Date | Format | Label | Ref(s) |
|---|---|---|---|---|
| United States | March 9, 1999 | CD; cassette | LaFace | |
