= List of Dutch Top 40 number-one singles of 1992 =

This is a list of the Dutch Top 40 number-one singles of 1992.

Issue Date	Song	Artist(s)	Reference
4 January	"I Love Your Smile"	Shanice	
11 January	"Don't Let the Sun Go Down on Me"	George Michael and Elton John	
18 January	"Don't Let the Sun Go Down on Me"	George Michael and Elton John	
25 January	"Don't Let the Sun Go Down on Me"	George Michael and Elton John	
1 February	"Don't Let the Sun Go Down on Me"	George Michael and Elton John	
8 February	"Don't Let the Sun Go Down on Me"	George Michael and Elton John	
15 February	"Don't Let the Sun Go Down on Me"	George Michael and Elton John	
22 February	"Don't Let the Sun Go Down on Me"	George Michael and Elton John	
29 February	"Don't Let the Sun Go Down on Me"	George Michael and Elton John	
7 March	"I Can't Dance"	Genesis	
14 March	"I Can't Dance"	Genesis	
21 March	"Twilight Zone"	2 Unlimited	
28 March	"Twilight Zone"	2 Unlimited	
4 April	"Under the Bridge"	Red Hot Chili Peppers	
11 April	"Under the Bridge"	Red Hot Chili Peppers	
18 April	"Under the Bridge"	Red Hot Chili Peppers	
25 April	"To Be with You"	Mr. Big	
2 May	"To Be with You"	Mr. Big	
9 May	"To Be with You"	Mr. Big	
16 May	"To Be with You"	Mr. Big	
23 May	"Please Don't Go"	Double You	
30 May	"Please Don't Go"	Double You	
6 June	"Rhythm Is a Dancer"	Snap!	
13 June	"Rhythm Is a Dancer"	Snap!	
20 June	"Rhythm Is a Dancer"	Snap!	
27 June	"Rhythm Is a Dancer"	Snap!	
4 July	"Knockin' on Heaven's Door"	Guns N' Roses	
11 July	"Knockin' on Heaven's Door"	Guns N' Roses	
18 July	"Knockin' on Heaven's Door"	Guns N' Roses	
25 July	"I'll Be There"	Mariah Carey and Trey Lorenz	
1 August	"I'll Be There"	Mariah Carey and Trey Lorenz	
8 August	"It's My Life"	Dr. Alban	
15 August	"It's My Life"	Dr. Alban	
22 August	"It's My Life"	Dr. Alban	
29 August	"It's My Life"	Dr. Alban	
5 September	"It's My Life"	Dr. Alban	
12 September	"It's My Life"	Dr. Alban	
19 September	"It's My Life"	Dr. Alban	
26 September	"Too Much Love Will Kill You"	Brian May	
3 October	"Too Much Love Will Kill You"	Brian May	
10 October	"Too Much Love Will Kill You"	Brian May	
17 October	"Sweat (A La La La La Long)"	Inner Circle	
24 October	"Sweat (A La La La La Long)"	Inner Circle	
31 October	"Sweat (A La La La La Long)"	Inner Circle	
7 November	"Sweat (A La La La La Long)"	Inner Circle	
14 November	"Sweat (A La La La La Long)"	Inner Circle	
21 November	"End of the Road"	Boyz II Men	
28 November	"End of the Road"	Boyz II Men	
5 December	"End of the Road"	Boyz II Men	
12 December	"I Will Always Love You"	Whitney Houston	
19 December	"I Will Always Love You"	Whitney Houston	
26 December	"I Will Always Love You"	Whitney Houston	

== See also ==
- 1992 in music
- List of number-one hits (Netherlands)
