= Don't Waste My Time =

Don't Waste My Time may refer to:

- "Don't Waste My Time" (The Angels song), 1986
- "Don't Waste My Time" (Little Big Town song), 2002
- "Don't Waste My Time" (Paul Hardcastle song), 1986
- "Don't Waste My Time" (Status Quo song), 1972
- "Don't Waste My Time" (Usher song), 2019
- Don't Waste My Time (Lisa Taylor song), 1993
- "Don't Waste My Time", a 2013 song by Krept and Konan from Young Kingz
- "Don't Waste My Time", a 1996 song by Sa-Deuce from Sa-Deuce
