= Tamara Savage =

American songwriter (born 1979)

Tamara Savage-Thompson
- Born: 1979 (age 46–47); Ventura, California, United States
- Education: University of Southern California
- Musical career
- Genres: R&B; soul; hip hop; gospel
- Occupation: Songwriter
- Label: EMI Music Publishing

Tamara Savage is an American songwriter born in 1979 in California, who started writing songs in 1998 at the age of 19. She has written for Tamia, Monica, Faith Evans, Mary Mary, Heather Headley, Shanice, Whitney Houston, Mýa and Tracie Spencer, among others.

== Early career ==
Savage and her three younger siblings were attending a private Christian school in Texas ran by their mother when she realized she enjoyed creative writing. She began writing songs to Aaliyah instrumentals while in her early teens.

By the mid-1990s, Savage, then a USC student and musical performer, began shopping a demo of hers around in hopes of receiving a record deal, when it was heard by Big Jon Platt. Platt would later sign her to a development deal with EMI while still in college. In 1997, her new mentor Platt, then Senior Vice President of Creative at EMI Music Publishing, started setting up collaborations between her and EMI writers such as Soulshock & Karlin and Jermaine Dupri. EMI flew Savage to Atlanta to co-write a song with Dupri for the South Park: Bigger, Longer & Uncut soundtrack, which was expected to be recorded by singer Janet Jackson, but when Savage began working with Dupri, they decided to focus first on writing a song for Monica, which resulted in Savages' first placement: Billboard number one single "The First Night".

== Selected songwriting discography ==
Credits are courtesy of Discogs, Tidal, Apple Music, and AllMusic.

| Title | Year | Artist | Album |
|---|---|---|---|
| "The First Night" | 1998 | Monica | The Boy Is Mine |
| "Take Me There" (Featuring Blinky Blink & Mase) | 1998 | Blackstreet & Mya | The Rugrats Movie (soundtrack) |
| "One Wish" | 1998 | Deborah Cox | One Wish |
| "When I Close My Eyes" | 1998 | Shanice | Shanice |
| "Wanna Hear You Say" | 1998 | Shanice | Shanice |
| "Heartbreak Hotel" (Featuring Faith Evans & Kelly Price) | 1998 | Whitney Houston | My Love Is Your Love |
| "My Life" | 1999 | TLC | FanMail |
| "Get None" (Featuring Jermaine Dupri & Amil) | 1999 | Tamar Braxton | Tamar |
| "If U Wanna Get Down" | 1999 | Tracie Spencer | Tracie |
| "Feelin' You" (Featuring Sonja Blade) | 1999 | Tracie Spencer | Tracie |
| "I'm Wanted" (Featuring Richie Sambora) | 1999 | Kel Spencer | Wild Wild West (soundtrack) |
| "Getting Closer" (Featuring Kel Spencer) | 1999 | Tatyana Ali | Wild Wild West (soundtrack) |
| "Can We Get Personal?" | 1999 | Juice | Can We Get Personal? |
| "Ride & Shake" | 2000 | Mya | Fear of Flying |
| "Joy" | 2000 | Mary Mary | Thankful |
| "Big Momma's Theme" (Featuring Destiny's Child) | 2000 | Da Brat & Vita | Big Momma's House (soundtrack) |
| "Treated Like Her" | 2000 | LaTocha Scott & Chanté Moore | Big Momma's House (soundtrack) |
| "Don't Tell Me" | 2001 | Sweet Female Attitude | In Person |
| "If I Could" | 2002 | Dru Hill | Dru World Order |
| "Gotta Give It Up" | 2002 | Pam & Dodi | Pam & Dodi |
| "Yes, No, Maybe" | 2002 | Her Sanity | Xclusive |
| "It's A Party" | 2003 | Tamia | Honey (soundtrack) |
| "You're Gonna Get It" (Featuring Diamond Stone) | 2004 | Angie Stone | Stone Love |
| "Freakin You (Set The Mood)" | 2005 | N2U | Issues |
| "Everytime I..." | 2006 | Mario Vazquez | Mario Vazquez |
| "Wait a Minute" | 2006 | Heather Headley | In My Mind |
| "So Special" | 2006 | LeToya Luckett | LeToya |
| "Unbelievable" | 2007 | Sunshine Anderson | Sunshine at Midnight |
| "Always Gonna Be Somethin'" | 2008 | Chanté Moore | Love the Woman |
| "Amnesia" | 2010 | Cheryl | Messy Little Raindrops |
| "Try Harder" | 2019 | Blaque | Torch |

=== Guest Appearances ===
| Title | Year | Artist | Album |
|---|---|---|---|
| "Pitch In on a Party" (background vocals) | 1999 | DJ Quik | Balance & Options |
| "Get Back" (Featuring Ja Rule & Tamara Savage) | 2000 | Da Brat | Unrestricted |
| "Too Hot to Stop" (background vocals) | 2000 | Lil Zane | Young World: The Future |
| "Hood Star" (Featuring Tamara Savage) | 2010 | Crooked I | Hood Star |

== Awards and nominations ==
| Year | Ceremony | Award | Result | Ref |
|---|---|---|---|---|
| 2000 | 42nd Annual Grammy Awards | Grammy Award for Best R&B Song (Heartbreak Hotel) | Nominated | |
