= Doin' My Thang =

Doin' My Thang refers to:

- "Doin' My Thang", a song by Zion I from True & Livin'
- "Doin' My Thang", a song by Shanice from her self-titled album
