= I'll Bet She's Got a Boyfriend =

Single by Shanice Wilson

from the album Discovery
- Released: June 17, 1988
- Recorded: 1987
- Genre: Freestyle; R&B
- Length: 4:36
- Label: A&M
- Songwriter: Bryan Loren
- Producer: Bryan Loren

Shanice Wilson singles chronology
"The Way You Love Me" (1988)	"I'll Bet She's Got a Boyfriend" (1988)	"This Time" (1988)

"I'll Bet She's Got a Boyfriend" is a song by Shanice Wilson. It was the fourth and final single released from her debut album Discovery. Although released as a single, it was not included on Ultimate Collection. The single had a music video.

== Track listing ==
12" single USA

A1. "I'll Bet She's Got a Boyfriend" (Miami Mix) (6:01)
B1. "I'll Bet She's Got a Boyfriend" (House Mix) (6:20)
B2. "I'll Bet She's Got a Boyfriend" (LP Version) (4:36)

12" single UK

A1. "I'll Bet She's Got a Boyfriend"** (Urban Mix) (7:20)
B1. "I'll Bet She's Got a Boyfriend"** (Underground Dub Mix) (5:00)
B2. "I'll Bet She's Got a Boyfriend"* (Miami Mix) (6:01)

12" single Canada

A1. "I'll Bet She's Got a Boyfriend" (Miami Mix) (6:01)
A2. "I'll Bet She's Got a Boyfriend" (Miami Edit) (3:45)
B1. "I'll Bet She's Got a Boyfriend" (House Version) (6:20)
B2. "I'll Bet She's Got a Boyfriend" (House Edit) (3:40)

* Remixed by Phil Harding ** Remixed by Phil Harding, Jamie Bromfield, and Rory K

== Charts ==
Chart (1988)	Peak Position
Australia (ARIA)	69
New Zealand (Recorded Music NZ)	27
UK Singles (Official Charts)	78
