= Straight to the Point (Damion Hall album) =

Studio album by Damion Hall
- Released: April 26, 1994
- Recorded: 1993–94
- Genre: R&B; new jack swing
- Length: 1:13:45
- Label: Silas; MCA
- Producer: Brandon Barnes; Brian McKnight; Bryan Loren; Damion Hall; Donald Parks; Emanuel Officer; John Howcott; Jon Nettlesbey; Sean Hall; Terry Coffey; Tricky Stewart

Singles from Straight to the Point
- 1. "Satisfy You" Released: March 22, 1994; 2. "Do Me Like You Wanna Be Done" Released: August 30, 1994

Professional ratings
Review scores
Source	Rating
AllMusic	2/5 stars

Straight to the Point is the only solo studio album by American contemporary R&B singer Damion Hall. It was released in 1994 via Silas/MCA Records. Production was handled by Sean Hall, Tricky Stewart, Brian McKnight, Bryan Loren, Brandon Barnes, Donald Parks, Emanuel Officer, John Howcott, Jon Nettlesbey, Terry Coffey, and Damion Hall himself, who also served as executive producer together with Louil Silas Jr. and Ron Gillyard. It features guest appearances from Chanté Moore and Damion's brother and fellow Guy groupmate Aaron Hall. The album debuted at number 147 on the Billboard 200 and number 22 on the Top R&B Albums in the United States. It was supported with two singles: "Satisfy You", which reached No. 48 on the Hot R&B/Hip-Hop Songs, No. 62 on the R&B/Hip-Hop Airplay, No. 38 on the Adult R&B Airplay and No. 55 on the Hot R&B/Hip-Hop Singles Sales, and "Do Me Like You Wanna Be Done".

== Track listing ==
No.	Title	Writer(s)	Producer(s)	Length
1.	"Let's Get It Going"	Kevin Bascus; Damion Hall; Sean Hall; Chris Stewart	Damion Hall; Sean Hall; Tricky Stewart	5:10
2.	"Love's Knockin'"	Donald Parks; Emanuel Officer; John Howcott	Donald Parks; Emanuel Officer; John Howcott	5:46
3.	"Crazy About You"	D. Hall; S. Hall; Stewart	Damion Hall; Sean Hall (co.); Tricky Stewart (co.)	5:59
4.	"Do Me Like You Wanna Be Done"	D. Hall; S. Hall; Stewart	Sean Hall; Tricky Stewart; Damion Hall (co.)	4:52
5.	"A Song for You" (featuring Aaron Hall)	Leon Russell	Jon Nettlesbey; Terry Coffey	5:27
6.	"Satisfy You" (featuring Chanté Moore)	Bryan Loren	Bryan Loren	6:01
7.	"Holdin' On"	D. Hall; S. Hall; Stewart	Damion Hall; Sean Hall (co.); Tricky Stewart (co.)	5:51
8.	"Lost Inside of You"	Brian McKnight; Brandon Barnes	Brian McKnight; Brandon Barnes	4:28
9.	"Never Enough"	McKnight; Victor Brooks	Brian McKnight	4:52
10.	"Second Chance"	McKnight; Barnes	Brian McKnight	4:46
11.	"Now or Never"	Nick Dibenedetto; S. Hall; Stewart	Sean Hall; Tricky Stewart; Damion Hall (co.)	4:52
12.	"Long Lasting Love Affair"	D. Hall; S. Hall; Stewart	Sean Hall; Tricky Stewart	4:26
13.	"Black as You Wanna Be"	D. Hall; S. Hall; Stewart	Damion Hall; Sean Hall (co.); Tricky Stewart (co.)	4:09
14.	"Satisfy You (Remix)" (featuring Chanté Moore)	Loren	Bryan Loren	7:06
Total length:				1:13:45

== Personnel ==
- Damion "Crazy Legs" Hall – vocals, producer (tracks: 1, 3, 7, 13), co-producer (tracks: 4, 11), executive producer
- Aaron Hall – vocals (track 5)
- Chanté Moore – vocals (tracks: 6, 14)
- Valerie Davis – backing vocals (tracks: 1, 11)
- Tammy White – backing vocals (track 2)
- Marc Nelson – backing vocals (track 7)
- Brian McKnight – backing vocals (tracks: 9, 10), producer (tracks: 8–10)
- Nick Dibenedetto – backing vocals (track 11)
- Donnell Spencer Jr. – live drums (track 9)
- Sean Hall – producer (tracks: 1, 4, 11, 12), co-producer (tracks: 3, 7, 13)
- Christopher "Tricky" Stewart – producer (tracks: 1, 4, 11, 12), co-producer (tracks: 3, 7, 13)
- Donald Parks – producer (track 2)
- Emanuel Officer – producer (track 2)
- John Howcott – producer (track 2)
- Jon Nettlesbey – producer (track 5)
- Terry Coffey – producer (track 5)
- Bryan Loren – producer & mixing (tracks: 6, 14), re-mixing (track 14)
- Brandon Barnes – producer (track 8)
- Christopher M. Wood – recording (tracks: 1, 4, 7–13)
- NHP Sound, Inc. – recording & mixing (track 2)
- Michael Girgis – recording (track 3)
- Michael Wells – recording (track 5)
- John Schmit – recording assistant (track 5)
- Manny Marroquin – recording assistant (track 5)
- Bryan Carrigan – engineering (tracks: 6, 14)
- Kevin Davis – mixing (tracks: 1, 3, 4, 7, 11–13)
- Alan Meyerson – mixing (track 5)
- David Koenig – mixing (tracks: 8–10)
- Rob Groome – mixing assistant (track 1)
- John "Bernasky" Wall – mixing assistant (track 2)
- Richard Huredia – mixing assistant (tracks: 3, 7–10, 12, 13)
- Gabriel Sutter – mixing assistant (track 5)
- Scott Blockland – re-mixing assistant (track 14)
- Louil Silas Jr. – executive producer
- Ronald R. Gillyard – executive producer

== Charts ==
Chart (1994)	Peak position
US Billboard 200	147
US Top R&B Albums (Billboard)	22
