= Flex & Shanice =

American reality television series (2014–2016)

- Genre: Reality
- Starring: Flex Alexander; Shanice Wilson
- Country of origin: United States
- Original language: English
- No. of seasons: 3
- No. of episodes: 24

Production
- Camera setup: Multiple
- Running time: 42 minutes

Original release
- Network: Oprah Winfrey Network
- Release: November 1, 2014 – August 27, 2016

Flex & Shanice is an American reality television series starring Flex Alexander and Shanice Wilson. It premiered on November 1, 2014, on the Oprah Winfrey Network, as part of its Saturday-night reality lineup.

== Episodes ==
=== Series overview ===
| Season | Episodes | Originally released | |
| Season | Episodes | First released | Last released |
|---|---|---|---|
| 1 | 8 | November 1, 2014 | December 20, 2014 |
| 2 | 8 | July 11, 2015 | August 29, 2015 |
| 3 | 8 | July 9, 2016 | August 27, 2016 |

=== Season 1 (2014) ===
| No. overall | No. in season | Title | Original release date | U.S. viewers (millions) |
|---|---|---|---|---|
| 1 | 1 | "Fake It Until You Make It" | November 1, 2014 | N/A |
| 2 | 2 | "Too Legit To Quit" | November 8, 2014 | N/A |
| 3 | 3 | "On a Song and a Prayer" | November 15, 2014 | N/A |
| 4 | 4 | "Facing the Music" | November 22, 2014 | N/A |
| 5 | 5 | "Talk to the Horn" | November 29, 2014 | N/A |
| 6 | 6 | "Gettin' in the Spirit" | December 6, 2014 | 0.39 |
| 7 | 7 | "Welcome to the Jungle" | December 13, 2014 | 0.33 |
| 8 | 8 | "It's My Party..." | December 20, 2014 | 0.38 |

=== Season 2 (2015) ===
| No. overall | No. in season | Title | Original release date | U.S. viewers (millions) |
|---|---|---|---|---|
| 9 | 1 | "Back to Square Onesie" | July 11, 2015 | 0.45 |
| 10 | 2 | "Glozell & the Bad Houseguest" | July 18, 2015 | 0.39 |
| 11 | 3 | "Turn Down for What" | July 25, 2015 | 0.50 |
| 12 | 4 | "Serious as a Heart Attack" | August 1, 2015 | 0.39 |
| 13 | 5 | "These Heels Were Made for Walking" | August 8, 2015 | 0.41 |
| 14 | 6 | "Adventures in Mommysitting" | August 15, 2015 | 0.44 |
| 15 | 7 | "Back in the Fame Game" | August 22, 2015 | 0.51 |
| 16 | 8 | "There’s a New Sheriff in Town" | August 29, 2015 | 0.64 |

=== Season 3 (2016) ===
| No. overall | No. in season | Title | Original release date | U.S. viewers (millions) |
|---|---|---|---|---|
| 17 | 1 | "From 0 to 360" | July 9, 2016 | 0.30 |
| 18 | 2 | "Wiggin’ Out" | July 16, 2016 | 0.32 |
| 19 | 3 | "Channeling Vegas" | July 23, 2016 | 0.28 |
| 20 | 4 | "What Happens in Vegas..." | July 30, 2016 | 0.29 |
| 21 | 5 | "Bullies & Breakdowns" | August 6, 2016 | 0.30 |
| 22 | 6 | "Basketball, Boys & Bad Behavior" | August 13, 2016 | 0.29 |
| 23 | 7 | "Moving Up & Moving On" | August 20, 2016 | 0.28 |
| 24 | 8 | "Hawaiian Honeymoon...For 8" | August 27, 2016 | 0.26 |
