= When I Close My Eyes (Shanice song) =

Single by Shanice

from the album Shanice
- Released: December 16, 1998
- Genre: R&B
- Length: 3:25
- Label: LaFace/Arista
- Songwriters: Warryn Smiley Campbell, Tamara Savage
- Producer: Warryn Smiley Campbell

Shanice singles chronology
"If I Never Knew You" (1995)	"When I Close My Eyes" (1998)	"Yesterday" (1999)

"When I Close My Eyes" is a song by Shanice, released as the first single from her fourth album, Shanice. It was her first single in over four years. It was released to radio on December 16, 1998.On April 3, 1999, the single made chart history when it made the biggest jump in the history of the Billboard Hot 100, moving 75 positions from number 91 to number 16, a record held by the single until 2006. It became her first top 20 hit since "Saving Forever for You," and her last one to date.

== Music video ==
The music video begins with Shanice's love interest (played by Will Lemay) walking a white horse along a foggy road. The video switches between scenes with Shanice and her backup dancers, a pink room with Shanice in a white dress, and her sitting at the end of a long black pool with water. There is also a scene where Shanice and her love interest kiss and they ride the horse. In the end, Shanice, who is in her car, meets him in front of a store.

== Track listing ==
- U.S. CD/cassette single
1. "When I Close My Eyes" (Album Version) - 3:23
2. Snippets (You Need A Man, Yesterday, You Can Bounce, Fly Away) - 4:54
3. "When I Close My Eyes" (Instrumental) - 3:23
- Promo CD Single
1. "When I Close My Eyes" (Album Version) - 3:23
2. "When I Close My Eyes" (Instrumental) - 3:23

== Weekly charts ==
=== Weekly charts ===
Chart (1999)	Peak position
US Billboard Hot 100 (Billboard)	12
US Hot R&B/Hip-Hop Songs (Billboard)	4
US Rhythmic (Billboard)	34

=== Year-end charts ===
Chart (1999)	Position
US Hot R&B/Hip-Hop Songs (Billboard)	47
