= This Time (Kiara song) =

Single by Kiara and Shanice Wilson

from the album To Change and/or Make a Difference
- B-side: "Strawberry Letter 23"
- Released: July 5, 1988
- Genre: R&B, soul
- Length: 4:37
- Label: Arista
- Songwriter: Charlie Singleton
- Producer: Nick Martinelli

Kiara singles chronology
"The Best of Me" (1988)	"This Time" (1988)	"Every Little Time" (1989)

Shanice Lorraine Wilson singles chronology
"I'll Bet She's Got a Boyfriend" (1988)	"This Time" (1988)	"I Love Your Smile" (1991)

"This Time" is a duet song performed by Detroit R&B duo Kiara and singer Shanice Wilson. It became a #2 hit on the R&B charts, only missing the top position to New Edition's "Can You Stand the Rain". A music video was filmed.

== Track listing ==
12" single

A1. "This Time" (Extended Remix) (6:13)
B1. "This Time" (Single Remix) (4:26)
B2. "Strawberry Letter 23" (4:02)

== Charts ==
Chart (1989)	Peak Position
UK Singles (Official Charts)	81
US Billboard Hot 100 (Billboard)	78
US Hot R&B/Hip-Hop Songs (Billboard)	2
