= Lisa Taylor (R&B singer) =

American singer-songwriter

- Genres: Gospel, R&B, soul
- Occupation: Singer
- Instrument: Vocals
- Label: Giant Records

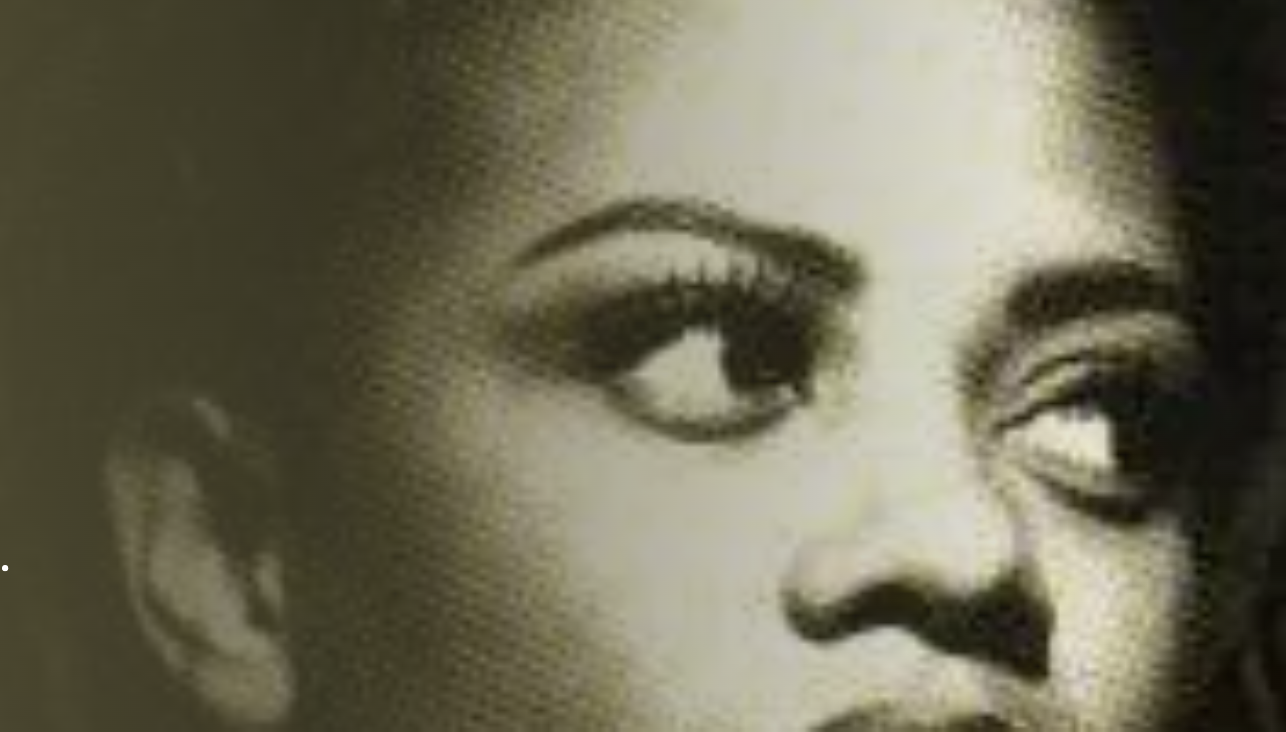

Lisa Taylor is an American R&B singer. She is best known for her solo album Secrets of the Heart, including the R&B singles "Did You Pray Today?" (#40) and "Secrets of the Heart" (#41), "Don’t Waste My Time" from The Meteor Man soundtrack, and for singing as a featured and background vocalist for artists including Burt Bacharach, Janet Jackson, Philip Bailey, Patti LaBelle, and Elvis Costello, among others.

== Early life and education ==
Taylor grew up in Youngstown, Ohio. Her family was actively involved in the local church singing gospel, where she drew her inspiration. As a child, her gospel musical roots were firmly planted while listening to Albertina Walker, The Caravans, James Cleveland, Shirley Caesar, The Mississippi Mass Choir, and Andre Crouch. She would be influenced later by jazz artists including Quincy Jones, Wes Montgomery, and Freddie Hubbard, as well as R&B artists such as The Jackson Five, Natalie Cole, Rufus featuring Chaka Khan, EWF, Minnie Ripperton, and Deniece Williams.

== Career ==
While in Youngstown, Taylor worked with the local band Vegas. A gig with Vegas as opening act for The Temptations, lead to an introduction to Norman Whitfield. She relocated to Los Angeles and went to see Whitfield at Hitsville West with Joe from Undisputed Truth and two others as a group, but they didn't get signed. Going back to see Whitfield in 1987 lead to Taylor singing with Rose Royce including lead vocals on "Wishing on A Star" and "Car Wash" and recording the album "Perfect Lover" with them.

Taylor began her career as a session singer in Los Angeles. While recording songs with producers and writers she met through her work with Rose Royce, she began touring as a background singer with Christopher Williams, Karyn White, and The Gap Band. Taylor recorded songs with producer Sami McKinney, Robert Brookins, and Randy Cantor. McKinney and Taylor shopped her demos and signed a deal with Giant Records, Irving Azoff's new label, distributed by Warner Bros.

In 1992, upon signing with Giant Records by Irving Azoff, Taylor's album, Secrets of the Heart was released. She performed the title track on Soul Train on May 9, 1992. Other performers on the show included El Debarge with Chante Moore, and Kris Kross.

She released the single "Don't Waste My Time" from The Meteor Man soundtrack which peaked at #94 in 1993.

Taylor performed as a background vocalist on the Janet World Tour November 24, 1993 through April 22, 1995.

Taylor was a featured and background vocalist with Burt Bacharach in the 90s, including touring and recording. Kevin Courtney of the Irish Times reviewing "Bacharach in Person" wrote "Singer Lisa Taylor duly obliged, singing a stunning version of Anyone Who Had A Heart, and anyone who had hairs on the back of their neck would have felt a jolt of electricity at the song's climax."

Taylor was the featured vocalist for the band Colour Club on their second album In The Flow and third album Sexuality.

Taylor was lead vocalist for Rose Royce from 2000 - 2004.

In 2006, LaBelle covered Taylor's song "Did You Pray Today" on her "The Gospel According to Patti LaBelle" album.

== Singles ==
Singles

| Year | Single | Peak positions |
| Year | Single | Hot R&B/Hip-Hop Singles & Tracks |
|---|---|---|
| 1992 | "Secrets of the Heart" | 41 |
| 1992 | "Did You Pray Today?" | 40 |
| 1993 | "Don't Waste My Time" | 94 |

=== Selected credits ===
- Burt Bacharach - One Amazing Night
- Burt Bacharach & Elvis Costello - Sessions at West 54th Street
