= 21... Ways to Grow =

Studio album by Shanice
- Released: June 21, 1994
- Studios: Aire L.A., (Glendale, California); Banana Boat Recording Studio, B and B, Bosstown Recording Studios, D.A.R.P. Doppler Studios, Kross Wire Studio (Atlanta); Flyte Tyme Productions (Edina, Minnesota); Larrabee Sound Studios, Paramount Studios, The Enterprise, Winsonic Process (Los Angeles)
- Length: 51:08
- Label: Motown
- Producers: Lance Alexander; Bo & McArthur; Jermaine Dupri; Kiyamma Griffin; Krystal Penni Entertainment; Ike Lee III; Bryan Loren; Prof T.; Guy Roche; Daryl Simmons; Chris Stokes; Tim & Bob; Colin Wolfe

Shanice chronology
Inner Child (1991)	21... Ways to Grow (1994)	Shanice (1999)

Singles from 21... Ways to Grow
- 1. "Somewhere" Released: May 17, 1994; 2. "Turn Down the Lights" Released: July 26, 1994; 3. "I Like" Released: August 1, 1994; 4. "I Wish" Released: August 21, 1994

21... Ways to Grow is the third studio album by American R&B singer Shanice. It was released by Motown Records on June 21, 1994, in the United States. Less successful than her 1991 album Inner Child, it peaked at number 46 on the US Billboard's Top R&B/Hip-Hop Albums and at number 184 on the US Billboard 200. It includes the minor hit singles "Somewhere" and "Turn Down the Lights".

== Critical reception ==
Professional ratings
Review scores
Source	Rating
AllMusic	2/5 stars
Los Angeles Times	3/4 stars
Music Week	3/5 stars
Vibe	(negative)

Jean Rosenbluth of the Los Angeles Times wrote that: "On this coming-of-age album, the veteran recording artist celebrates adulthood with her most mature effort yet, a cohesive collection of playful hip-hop, come-hither power ballads and aggressive funk." Vibe contributor Jeremy Helligar commended Shanice's "versatile and finely nuanced" voice and being more involved in the album's production, but felt it lacked cohesiveness when going for numerous R&B demographics, concluding that: "Sure, Shanice wears all these hats well, especially that funky, funky chapeau on "I Like." But she'll have to streamline her scope to compete with the big girls.

== Track listing ==
No.	Title	Writer(s)	Producer(s)	Length
1.	"Ways to Grow (Intro)"	Shanice Wilson; Ronnie Hasley; Penni Wilson	Krystal Penni	0:37
2.	"I Care (Interlude)"	Tim Kelley; Bob Robinson	Tim & Bob	0:46
3.	"Don't Break My Heart"	Daryl Simmons	Simmons	4:24
4.	"Turn Down the Lights"	Bo Watson; McArthur; Babyface	Bo & McArthur	4:31
5.	"Somewhere"	Wilson; Kiyamma Griffin; Ike Lee; Christopher Williams	Griffin; Lee; Williams; Shanice^{[a]}; Crystal Wilson^{[a]}	4:13
6.	"Ace Boon Coon"	Wilson; Jermaine Dupri; Manuel Seal	Dupri; Seal	3:32
7.	"I Like"	Wilson; Chris Stokes	Stokes	4:49
8.	"Give Me the Love I Need"	Wilson; Stokes	Stokes	4:21
9.	"I'll Be There"	Kelley; Robinson	Tim & Bob	5:00
10.	"I Wish"	Lance Alexander; Tony Tolbert	Alexander; Prof T.	5:56
11.	"When I Say That I Love You"	Bryan Loren; Dianne Quander	Loren	3:57
12.	"I Want to Give It to You"	Wilson; Colin Wolfe	Wolfe	3:59
13.	"Never Changing Love"	Diane Warren	Guy Roche; Shanice	4:16

Japan bonus track(s)
No.	Title	Writer(s)	Producer(s)	Length
14.	"Needing Me"	Wilson; Griffin; Lee	Griffin; Lee; Williams; Shanice^{[a]}; Wilson^{[a]}	4:01
15.	"Jesus Loves Me"	Anna Bartlett Warner; William Batchelder Bradbury		0:51
16.	"It's for You"	Wilson; Eric Kirkland; Michael Angelo Saulsberry	Kirkland; Saulsberry	4:05

Notes

- ^{^[a]} denotes a co-producer

== Charts ==
Chart (1994)	Peak position
Australian Albums (ARIA)	150
Japanese Albums (Oricon)	25
US Billboard 200	184
US Top R&B/Hip-Hop Albums (Billboard)	46
