= Secrets of the Heart (album) =

Studio album by Lisa Taylor
- Released: 1992
- Genre: R&B; pop; soul; contemporary gospel
- Label: Giant Records; (Warner Records; Warner Bros. Records
- Producer: Robert Brookins; Sami McKinney; Daniel Sembello; Nicky Holland; Michael Stokes; Kyle Hudnall; KC Porter

Singles from Secrets of the Heart
- 1. "Secrets of the Heart" Released: March 1992; 2. "Did You Pray Today?" Released: June 1992

Secrets of the Heart is the debut studio album by American R&B singer Lisa Taylor released in 1992 by Giant Records and Warner Bros. Records. The album is a pop, R&B, and contemporary gospel record. It was primarily produced by Robert Brookins and Sami McKinney. "Secrets of the Heart" was issued as the first single in March 1992, reaching #41 on the Billboard R&B Chart. "Did You Pray Today" was released in June, reaching #40.

The track "Better Late Than Never" was included in the Class Act soundtrack.

== Background ==
Taylor recorded songs with producer Sam McKinney, Robert Brookins, and Randy Cantor. McKinney and Taylor shopped her demos and signed a deal with Giant Records, Irving Azoff's new label, distributed by Warner Bros.

== Music video ==
Taylor's music video for "Secrets of the Heart" was in rotation at BET and Record Guide's Street Beat, New Jersey, among a sampling of National Video Music Outlets.

== Critical reception ==
Cashbox wrote "a variety of music raging from gospel to Top 40" giving her album "a universal sound that should pay off in the end."

== Track listing ==
No.	Title	Writer(s)	Producer(s)	Length
1.	"Fallen Angel"	Christopher Williams; Michael O'Hara; Sami McKinney	Robert Brookins; Sami McKinney	4:27
2.	"Secrets Of The Heart"	Michael Dunlap; Sami McKinney	Robert Brookins; Sami McKinney	4:44
3.	"Better Late Than Never"	Keith Eaddy; Sami McKinney	Daniel Sembello	4:03
4.	"One Again Love"	Sami McKinney; Vince Morris	Robert Brookins; Sami McKinney	4:53
5.	"To Know Your Love"	Nicky Holland; Sami McKinney	Nicky Holland	3:48
6.	"Make You Mine"	Kyle Hudnall; Sami McKinney	Robert Brookins; Sami McKinney	3:47
7.	"Part Of My Heart"	Charles Fairy; Clarence McDonald; Sami McKinney	Robert Brookins; Sami McKinney	4:16
8.	"You Could Have Been With Me" ( Ralph Stacey; Sami McKinney)	Ralph Stacey; Sami McKinney	Daniel Sembello	3:52
9.	"I Can't Remember When"	Charles Fairy; Clarence McDonald; Sami McKinney	Robert Brookins; Sami McKinney	4:57
10.	"I Wanna Fall In Love Again"	KC Porter; Karin Rybar; Sami McKinney	KC Porter	3:46
11.	"Did You Pray Today?"	Michael O'Hara; Sami McKinney	Robert Brookins; Sami McKinney	5:40

== Singles ==
Year	Single	Peak positions
Year	Single	US R&B
1992	"Secrets of the Heart"	41
1992	"Did You Pray Today?"	40
