= The Meteor Man (film) =

1993 film by Robert Townsend

- Theatrical release poster
- Directed by: Robert Townsend
- Written by: Robert Townsend
- Produced by: Robert Townsend; Loretha C. Jones
- Starring: Robert Townsend; Marla Gibbs; Eddie Griffin; Robert Guillaume; James Earl Jones; Bill Cosby; Another Bad Creation; Luther Vandross; Sinbad; Naughty by Nature; Cypress Hill; Big Daddy Kane
- Cinematography: John A. Alonzo
- Edited by: Adam Bernardi; Richard Candib; Robaire W. Estel; Andrew London; Pam Wise
- Music by: Cliff Eidelman
- Production company: Tinsel Townsend Studios
- Distributed by: Metro-Goldwyn-Mayer
- Release date: August 6, 1993 (United States)
- Running time: 100 minutes
- Country: United States
- Language: English
- Budget: $20 million
- Box office: $8 million (domestic)

The Meteor Man is a 1993 American superhero comedy film written, directed, co-produced and starring Robert Townsend with supporting roles by Marla Gibbs, Eddie Griffin, Robert Guillaume, James Earl Jones, Bill Cosby and Another Bad Creation. The film also features special appearances by Luther Vandross, Sinbad, Naughty by Nature, Cypress Hill and Big Daddy Kane. Townsend stars as a mild-mannered teacher who becomes a superhero after his neighborhood in Washington, D.C., is terrorized by street gangs like the Golden Lords.

It is one of the earliest superhero films to feature an African American in a starring role.

== Plot ==
Jefferson Reed is a school teacher in Washington, D.C. His neighborhood is terrorized by a gang called the Golden Lords led by Simon Caine and allied with drug lord Anthony Byers.

One night, Jeff steps in to rescue a woman from the gang. He runs from them. Hiding in a garbage dumpster, he escapes. As Jeff climbs out, he is struck by a glowing green meteorite. His spine is crushed and he receives severe burns. A fragment of the meteor is left over and taken by a vagrant named Marvin. Reed awakens several days later in the hospital. When his bandages are taken off, he is miraculously healed of his injuries.

Jeff discovers that the meteorite has left him with spectacular superpowers, such as flight; x-ray vision; laser vision; superhuman strength, speed, and hearing; invulnerability; healing powers; the ability to absorb a book's content by touch; super breath; telepathy with dogs (which he uses to communicate with his own dog Ellington); and telekinesis. When he confides this to his parents Ted and Maxine, they convince him to use his powers to help the community. His mother designs a costume. As the Meteor Man, he takes on the Golden Lords. He shuts down 15 crack houses, stops 11 robberies, and brings peace between the police, the Crips, and the Bloods.

The Golden Lords learn of Meteor Man's secret identity and slowly diminishing powers. As the violence gets out of hand and the Golden Lords continue their attacks, the community members plan to make a deal with them. Jeff instead teaches them about fighting for their beliefs. A now-powerless Jeff fights Simon and is beaten up. Simon points his gun at Jeff, but Jeff's neighbor Earnest Moses throws a vinyl record at him, knocking the gun out of Simon's hand. Marvin then uses the meteor fragment to strip the Golden Lords of their guns. The locals stand up to the Golden Lords as they fight them alongside Marvin's dogs. Marvin accidentally drops the meteor. Jeff and Simon grab the rock from both sides, gaining superpowers, and engage in a brawl.

When Simon is about to throw a dumpster at Jeff, he hears Ellington barking, telling Jeff that he can win. Simon instead throws the dumpster at Ellington, seriously injuring him, then throws Jeff over a building. Jeff returns, costumed as Meteor Man. He ties up Simon and drains him of his powers by absorbing them. He then scares off the rest of the Golden Lords. The locals gather around Ellington, who is lying on the street, whimpering in pain. Jeff uses his x-ray vision to see that Ellington's ribs are broken before his powers fade away again. Marvin uses the last of his powers from the meteor fragment to heal Ellington’s injuries.

Anthony Byers and his gang confront Meteor Man, but are outnumbered by the Bloods and the Crips, who show up to protect Meteor Man. Byers and his gang are arrested by the approaching police officers after attempting to "take a vacation to the Bahamas".

== Cast ==
- Robert Townsend as Jefferson Reed / Meteor Man, a teacher who gains powers from a meteor fragment
- Marla Gibbs as Maxine Reed, Jefferson's mother
- Eddie Griffin as Michael Anderson, Jefferson's friend
- Robert Guillaume as Ted Reed, Jefferson's father
- James Earl Jones as Earnest Moses, Jefferson's neighbor
- Bill Cosby as Marvin, a mute Vagrant
- Another Bad Creation as the Jr. Lords, the child members of the Golden Lords
- Stephanie E. Williams as Stacy, a teacher and Jefferson's love interest
- Roy Fegan as Simon Caine, the leader of the Golden Lords
- Frank Gorshin as Anthony Byers, a drug lord that the Golden Lords are allied with
- Luther Vandross as Jamison
- Sinbad as Malik, Stacy's boyfriend
- Naughty by Nature as the Bloods, a street gang
- Cypress Hill as the Crips, a street gang
- Big Daddy Kane as "Pirate", a member of the Golden Lords
- Don Cheadle as "Goldilocks", a member of the Golden Lords
- Nancy Wilson as Principal Laws, the principal of an unnamed school who is Jefferson's boss
- Tommy 'Tiny' Lister as "Digit", the Golden Lords' strongman
- Jenifer Lewis as Mrs. Williams, Lewis's mother
- Biz Markie as himself
- Beverly Johnson as a doctor
- LaWanda Page as an old nurse
- Wallace Shawn as Mr. Little
- John Witherspoon as Clarence James Carter III
- Charlayne Woodard as Janice Farrell
- Sam Jackson as "Dre"
- Barbara Montgomery as Dre's mother
- Faizon Love as a husband
- Stu Gilliam as a head physician
- Jeff Coopwood as the voice of the radio DJ
- Chris Tucker as MC in mall (uncredited)

== Production ==
Although Washington was the setting, the film was shot in the Reservoir Hill neighborhood of Baltimore, Maryland.

== Soundtrack ==
1. "It's for You" – Shanice
2. "Don't Waste My Time" – Lisa Taylor
3. "You Turn Me On" – Hi-Five
4. "Who Can" – Ahmad
5. "Your Future Is Our Future" – Daryl Coley & Frank McComb
6. "I Say a Prayer" – Howard Hewett
7. "Is It Just Too Much" – Keith Washington
8. "Somebody Cares for You" – Frank McComb
9. "Good Love" – Elaine Stepter
10. "Ain't Nobody Bad (Like Meteor Man)" – Big Hat Ray Ray

"Can't Let Her Get Away" by Michael Jackson appeared in the film, but was not included on the soundtrack album.

== Reception ==
Rotten Tomatoes gives the film a score of 25%, based on 16 critic reviews.

Peter Rainer of the Los Angeles Times compares the film to "a fairly clunky sitcom", with its sense of righteous do-goodism, and, although the film intends to inspire, it instead sends the message that it would take a superhero to clean up inner-city gang violence.

Stephen Holden of The New York Times opined that "the movie collapses on its own confusing and contradictory impulses. On the one hand, it would like to create a valid superhero for Black children. On the other, it is much more concerned with sending up the superhero genre. And the heroics and spoofing thoroughly undercut each other."

Desson Howe of The Washington Post wrote that "diehard Townsend fans will probably have a good time with it. But they should probably stop reading from here: This review has nothing positive to add. For those who considered Townsend's Five Heartbeats at least four too many, this movie is only slightly less excruciating. Slower than a stationary bullet, about as powerful as a . . . a loganberry, capable of running into buildings in a single bound, it's a bust, it's a shame, it's super dull."

Ty Burr gave it a "C" grade in Entertainment Weekly, and said that it was "very much like its writer-director-star: self-effacingly funny, kind of confused, but really, really nice".

Roger Ebert of the Chicago Sun-Times gave the film 2.5 stars out of 4, writing, "The movie contains big laughs and moments of genuine feeling, but it seems to be put together out of assorted inspirations that were never assembled into one coherent story line....Kids may like the film and anyone can enjoy the moments of inspiration, but 'The Meteor Man' could have been better if it had tried to do less, more carefully."

The film gained some cult followings.

=== Awards ===
The film received a Saturn Award nomination for Best Science Fiction Film, but lost to Jurassic Park.

== Comic ==
Marvel Comics produced an adaptation (Meteor Man: The Movie) and a sequel in the form of a six-issue limited series titled Meteor Man, which is set in the Marvel Universe. Meteor Man was written by Bert Hubbard and Dwight Coye and illustrated by Robert Walker and Jon Holdredge.

The Golden Lords appear in Miles Morales: Spider-Man #5, where they battle Miles Morales as well as Tombstone's gang.
