= (Baby Tell Me) Can You Dance =

Single by Shanice Wilson

from the album Discovery
- B-side: "Summer Love"
- Released: July 28, 1987
- Length: 4:49
- Label: A&M; 2939
- Songwriter: Bryan Loren
- Producer: Bryan Loren

Shanice Wilson singles chronology
"(Baby Tell Me) Can You Dance" (1987)	"No 1/2 Steppin'" (1987)

"(Baby Tell Me) Can You Dance" is the lead single by Shanice from her debut album, Discovery.

== Music video ==
The music video takes place in a city at night. The video features Shanice and many other dancers showing off their dance moves.

== Track listing ==
7" single (AM-2939) USA

1. "(Baby Tell Me) Can You Dance"
2. "Summer Love"

12" single (012235) USA

1. Club Mix
2. Instrumental
3. Radio Mix
4. The Shep Pettibone Mix

== Charts ==
Chart (1987)	Peak position
Netherlands (Dutch Top 40)	35
Netherlands (Single Top 100)	65
US Billboard Hot 100 (Billboard)	50
US Dance Club Songs (Billboard)	16
US Dance Singles Sales (Billboard)	39
US Hot R&B/Hip-Hop Songs (Billboard)	6
