= Saving Forever for You =

1992 single by Shanice

Single by Shanice

from the album Beverly Hills, 90210 soundtrack
- Released: October 1, 1992
- Genre: Pop
- Length: 4:27
- Label: Giant; Reprise
- Songwriter: Diane Warren
- Producer: David Foster

Shanice singles chronology
"Lovin' You" / "Silent Prayer" (1992)	"Saving Forever for You" (1992)	"It's for You" (1993)

"Saving Forever for You" is a song performed by American singer-songwriter Shanice, written by Diane Warren and produced by David Foster. It was one of the singles released by Giant and Reprise Records from the 1992 soundtrack album Music of Beverly Hills, 90210. It became Shanice's second and final top 10 US single, peaking at number four on the Billboard Hot 100. However, it does not appear on her 1999 compilation album Ultimate Collection. A music video was filmed for the song, featuring Brian Austin Green from Beverly Hills, 90210.

== Critical reception ==
Larry Flick from Billboard magazine wrote, "If you're hankering for fresh material from this highly talented pop/urban ingenue, look no further. This tune from the soundtrack to Fox-TV's Beverly Hills, 90210 is a sugary ballad that is given depth by Shanice's sincere delivery. While she would be better served by an arrangement that has a little less gloss, any chance to feast on her voice is well worth taking."

== Charts ==
=== Weekly charts ===
Chart (1992–1993)	Peak position
Australia (ARIA)	25
Canada Top Singles (RPM)	29
Europe (Eurochart Hot 100)	98
Europe (European Dance Radio)	24
Germany (GfK)	58
Netherlands (Dutch Top 40)	23
Netherlands (Single Top 100)	39
New Zealand (Recorded Music NZ)	41
UK Singles (Official Charts)	42
UK Airplay (Music Week)	49
US Billboard Hot 100	4
US Hot R&B/Hip-Hop Songs (Billboard)	20
US Mainstream Top 40 (Billboard)	6
US Rhythmic (Billboard)	4

=== Year-end charts ===
Chart (1993)	Rank
US Billboard Hot 100	33

== Release history ==
Region	Date	Format(s)	Label(s)	Ref.
United States	October 1, 1992	Cassette	Giant; Reprise	
Japan	November 28, 1992	Mini-CD	Giant	
United Kingdom	January 4, 1993	7-inch vinyl; CD; cassette	Giant; Reprise	
Australia	January 25, 1993	CD; cassette	Giant; Reprise	
