= The Way You Love Me (Shanice song) =

Single by Shanice Wilson

from the album Discovery
- B-side: "He's So Cute"
- Released: March 4, 1988
- Recorded: February – May 1987
- Genre: R&B
- Length: 4:12
- Label: A&M
- Songwriter: Bryan Loren
- Producer: Bryan Loren

Shanice Wilson singles chronology
"No 1/2 Steppin'" (1987)	"The Way You Love Me" (1988)	"I'll Bet She's Got a Boyfriend" (1988)

"The Way You Love Me" is a song by Shanice Wilson. It was the third single released from Discovery. It peaked at #53 on the Billboard R&B chart.

== Track listing ==
3" CD single Japan

1. The Way You Love Me (4:14)
2. He's So Cute (3:37)

== Charts ==
Chart (1988)	Peak position
US Hot R&B/Hip-Hop Songs (Billboard)	53
