= Don't Waste My Time (Lisa Taylor song) =

1993 single by Lisa Taylor

"Don’t Waste My Time"

Single by Lisa Taylor

from the album The Meteor Man
- B-side: "Your Future Is Our Future"
- Released: 1993
- Genre: Hip hop; R&B; funk; soul
- Length: 3:46
- Label: Motown
- Songwriters: Raymond Jones; Sami McKinney; Denise Rich
- Producers: Raymond Jones; Keith Shocklee

Lisa Taylor singles chronology
"Did You Pray Today?" (1992)	"Don’t Waste My Time" (1993)

Music video
- "Don’t Waste My Time" from The Meteor Man on YouTube

"Don’t Waste My Time" is a song recorded by American singer Lisa Taylor for the 1993 MGM film The Meteor Man . Written by and Raymond Jones, Sami McKinney and Denise Rich, it has an r&b/funk groove with hip hop influences. The song was released as the second single from The Meteor Man soundtrack album. The song peaked at #94 on the Billboard R&B charts.

== Critical reception ==
Gavin Report praised the song, declaring “I dare you to not tap your feet to Lisa Taylor’s “Don’t Waste My Time”. This Giant Records artist lends her vocal sweetness to Motown's Meteor Man soundtrack with applaudable results. “Don’t Waste My Time” gets better with each play.”

Several weeks later in their weekly Record To Watch pick, The Gavin Report wrote “Lisa Taylor’s “Don’t Waste My Time” from the Meteor Man soundtrack is a serious chart contender.”

Larry Flick of Billboard wrote “Lisa Taylor steps up to the plate with a light, easygoing urban/funk ditty. She makes the most of the material…stretching out over a clicking hip-hop-ish beat.”

Craig Lytle of AllMusic noted Lisa Taylor's "Don't Waste My Time" single from the Meteor Man soundtrack as “a featured release, peaking at #94 after two weeks on the Billboard R&B charts.”

== Track listing ==
Lisa Taylor

A1. Don’t Waste My Time Radio Edit (3:45)
A2. Don't Waste My Time LP Version (4:34)
A3. Wastin’ Time Mix* (4:23) remixed by Da MIC Professah

Frank McComb (featuring Daryl Coley)

B1. Your Future Is Our Future Radio Edit (3:41)
B2. Your Future Is Our Future Radio Edit (6:10)
B3. Don’t Waste My Time
B4. Don’t Waste My Time w/o Rap (4:24)
B5. Instrumental (4:38)
