= I Like (Shanice song) =

1994 single by Shanice

Single by Shanice

from the album 21... Ways to Grow
- Released: August 1, 1994
- Genre: New jack swing; house (remix)
- Length: 4:49
- Label: Motown
- Songwriters: Shanice Wilson; Chris Stokes
- Producer: Chris Stokes

Shanice singles chronology
"Turn Down the Lights" (1994)	"I Like" (1994)	"I Wish" (1994)

"I Like" is a song by American singer-songwriter Shanice, released in August 1994 by Motown Records as the third single from her third album, 21... Ways to Grow (1994). The song was written by Shanice with producer Chris Stokes and samples "I'll Take You There" by the Staple Singers. A music video was also produced to promote the single. "I Like" was nominated in the category for Tune of the Year at the International Dance Awards 1995.

== Critical reception ==
M.R. Martinez from Cash Box described the song as a "seductive ballad". Martin Johnson from Chicago Reader named it one of the album’s "most natural-sounding tracks", remarking that "she sounds self-assured and determined to elaborate her priorities." Alan Jones from Music Week gave it three out of five, writing, "Shanice is hitbound with this sinewy and hypnotic jack swing track, pushed in a more mainstream dance direction by Masters At Work's house re-styling." Pan-European magazine Music & Media commented, "'I Love' ('I Love Your Smile') was what she once sang; now it's 'I Like'. This romantic tuning down is translated to a more streetwise swingbeat song. We not only like it, we love it". Tony Farsides from the Record Mirror Dance Update noted that Shanice "returns with a more rugged sound" for "I Like".

== Track listings ==
- 12-inch single

A1. "I Like" (Masters at Work main mix)
A2. "I Like" (Masters at Work 54 dub)
B1. "I Like" (Kenny Dope main mix)
B2. "I Like" (Kenny Dope Troopapella)

- CD single
1. "I Like" (album version edit)
2. "I Like" (Masters at Work main mix)
3. "I Like" (Kenny Dope main mix)
4. "I Like" (Kenny Dope Vibes mix)

== Charts ==
Chart (1994–1995)	Peak position
Europe (European Dance Radio)	10
Scotland Singles (OCC)	80
Switzerland (Schweizer Hitparade)	49
UK Singles (OCC)	49
UK Dance (OCC)	5
UK Dance (Music Week)	5
UK Club Chart (Music Week)	9
US Dance Club Songs (Billboard)	38
