= No 1/2 Steppin' =

Single by Shanice Wilson

from the album Discovery
- Released: November 26, 1987
- Recorded: January 1987
- Genre: Freestyle, new jack swing
- Length: 4:56
- Label: A&M
- Songwriter(s): Bryan Loren
- Producer(s): Bryan Loren

Shanice Wilson singles chronology
"(Baby Tell Me) Can You Dance" (1987)	"No 1/2 Steppin'" (1987)	"The Way You Love Me" (1988)

"No 1/2 Steppin'" (pronounced No Half Steppin) is a song by Shanice Wilson. It was the second single released from Discovery. It became her second top 10 hit on the Billboard R&B chart.

== Music video ==
The music video includes a dance routine and shows a white background.

== Track listing ==
12" single (012256) USA

A1. "No 1/2 Steppin'" (Club Mix) (7:42)
A2. "No 1/2 Steppin'" (7" Edit) (3:55)
B1. "No 1/2 Steppin'" (Radio Version) (5:45)
B2. "No 1/2 Steppin'" (Dub Version) (4:10)

== Charts ==
Chart (1987)	Peak position
US Dance Club Songs (Billboard)	19
US Hot R&B/Hip-Hop Songs (Billboard)	6
