= Yesterday (Shanice song) =

Single by Shanice

from the album Shanice
- Released: July 20, 1999
- Genre: R&B
- Length: 3:49
- Label: LaFace/Arista
- Songwriters: Shanice Wilson, Jamey Jaz, Shari Watson
- Producer: Jamey Jaz

Shanice singles chronology
"When I Close My Eyes" (1999)	"Yesterday" (1999)	"You Need a Man" (1999)

"Yesterday" is a song by Shanice. It was the second single from Shanice's fourth studio album, Shanice and it was a released on July 20, 1999.

== Music video ==
A music video was filmed for the song but was not released. However, a rough draft of the video leaked in February 2008 which can be viewed on Shanice's YouTube channel.

== Track listing ==
- Promo CD Single
1. "Yesterday" (Album Version) - 3:49
2. "Yesterday" (Instrumental) - 3:49

== Charts ==
Chart (1999)	Peak position
US Bubbling Under Hot 100 (Billboard)	22
US Hot R&B/Hip-Hop Songs (Billboard)	40
