= Damion Hall =

American contemporary R&B singer

- Also known as: Crazy Legs
- Origin: Brooklyn, New York
- Genres: Contemporary R&B, pop
- Occupations: Singer, songwriter
- Instrument: Vocals
- Years active: 1989–present
- Label: Silas / MCA (1994)

Damion Hall, also known as Damion "Crazy Legs" Hall, is an American R&B singer from Brooklyn, New York. He is a member of the new jack swing group Guy and is the brother of Guy member, Aaron Hall. He has released one solo album, Straight to the Point, in 1994, which spawned one single, "Satisfy You", featuring Chanté Moore. That song managed to reach No. 48 on the Billboard R&B charts. He is currently unsigned but managed by celebrity and sports manager Glenn Toby. He is the son of Johnella and Aaron Hall II.

== Discography ==
- Straight to the Point (1994)
