= Discovery (Shanice album) =

Album by Shanice

Studio album by Shanice
- Released: October 21, 1987
- Recorded: 1986–1987
- Genre: R&B
- Length: 40:06
- Label: A&M
- Producer: Bryan Loren

Shanice chronology
Discovery (1987)	Inner Child (1991)

Singles from Discovery
- 1. "(Baby Tell Me) Can You Dance" Released: July 28, 1987; 2. "No 1/2 Steppin'" Released: November 26, 1987; 3. "The Way You Love Me" Released: March 4, 1988; 4. "I'll Bet She's Got a Boyfriend" Released: June 17, 1988

Professional ratings
Review scores
Source	Rating
AllMusic	3/5 stars

Discovery is the debut studio album by American R&B/pop singer Shanice, released October 21, 1987, by A&M Records. Shanice at the time was fourteen years old. The singles "(Baby Tell Me) Can You Dance", and "No 1/2 Steppin'" were top 10 R&B hits. "The Way You Love Me", and "I'll Bet She's Got a Boyfriend" were the final singles from the album.

Will Downing covered the song "Just a Game" on his 1995 album Moods.

== Track listing ==
All tracks written and arranged by Bryan Loren.

No.	Title	Length
1.	"I Think I Love You"	3:39
2.	"No 1/2 Steppin'"	4:56
3.	"(Baby Tell Me) Can You Dance"	4:49
4.	"Spend Some Time with Me"	4:01
5.	"He's So Cute"	5:41
6.	"I'll Bet She's Got a Boyfriend"	4:36
7.	"Do I Know You"	4:51
8.	"Just a Game"	4:32
9.	"The Way You Love Me"	4:12

== Personnel ==
- Bryan Loren – keyboards, bass guitar, synthesizers, guitars, drum programming
- Recording and mixing engineers: Paul McKenna, John Hedeges, Sabrina Buchanen, Richard Cottrell, Bryan Loren
- Executive producer – John McClain

== Charts ==
=== Weekly charts ===
Chart (1987)	Peak position
US Billboard 200	149
US Top R&B/Hip-Hop Albums (Billboard)	37

=== Year-end charts ===
Chart (1988)	Position
US Top R&B/Hip-Hop Albums (Billboard)	97

=== Singles ===
Title	Year	US Pop	US R&B	US Dance
"(Baby Tell Me) Can You Dance"	1987	50	6	16
"No 1/2 Steppin'"	1987	—	6	—
"The Way You Love Me"	1988	—	53	—
"I'll Bet She's Got a Boyfriend"	1988	—	—	—

== Notes ==
- "Summer Love" was the B-side for the lead single, "(Baby Tell Me) Can You Dance".
