= You Need a Man =

"You Need A Man"

Single by Shanice

from the album Shanice
- Released: September 7, 1999
- Recorded: May 1998–January 1999
- Genre: R&B
- Length: 3:52
- Label: LaFace/Arista
- Songwriters: Shanice Wilson, Montell Jordan, Danny Nixon
- Producer: Jazz The Man

Shanice singles chronology
"Yesterday" (1999)	"You Need A Man" (1999)	"Love is the Gift" (2000)

"You Need A Man" is a song by Shanice. It was the third and final single from Shanice's fourth studio album, Shanice. It was released on September 7, 1999.

== Track listing ==
CD single

1. Album Version (3:52)
2. Instrumental (3:52)

== Music video ==
The music video was directed by Bille Woodruff and filmed August 3, 1999.

== Weekly charts ==
Chart (1999)	Peak position
US Hot R&B/Hip-Hop Songs (Billboard)	53
