= Music of Beverly Hills, 90210 =

The following is a list of soundtrack releases for the Fox TV series Beverly Hills, 90210:

== Beverly Hills, 90210: The Soundtrack ==
Beverly Hills, 90210: The Soundtrack

Soundtrack album by Various artists
- Released: October 20, 1992
- Genres: R&B; rock; pop
- Label: Giant / Warner Bros.
- Producers: Kenneth Miller (exec.), Darren Star (exec.), Irving Azoff (exec.), Cassandra Mills (exec.), Elliot Wolff, Howie Tee, Color Me Badd, Robbie Nevil, Tommy Faragher, Lotti Golden, Gerry Brown, Vanessa Williams, Brian McKnight, Jim Dean, Puck, Pete Glenister, David Foster, Andre Cymone, Dancin' Danny D, Russ Titelman, Tuhin Roy, Jake Smith, John Davis

Singles from Beverly Hills 90210: The Soundtrack
- 1. "Saving Forever for You"; 2. "Love Is"; 3. "The Right Kind Of Love"; 4. "Why"

Beverly Hills, 90210: The Soundtrack is the first soundtrack album to the TV Show Beverly Hills, 90210, released in 1992. Subsequent soundtrack albums were released in 1994 (Beverly Hills 90210: The College Years) and 1996 (Beverly Hills 90210: Songs from the Peach Pit).

=== Track listing ===
No.	Title	Writer(s)	Producer(s)	Length
1.	"Bend Time Back Around" (performed by Paula Abdul)	Elliot Wolff	Wolff	3:57
2.	"Got 2 Have U" (performed by Color Me Badd)	Color Me Badd; Howard Thompson	Howie Tee; Color Me Badd (co.)	3:45
3.	"The Right Kind of Love" (performed by Jeremy Jordan)	Tommy Faragher; Lotti Golden; Robbie Nevil	Nevil; Faragher; Golden	4:47
4.	"Love Is" (performed by Vanessa Williams and Brian McKnight)	Tonio K; John Keller	Gerry Brown; V. Williams; McKnight; Robert von Arx (assoc.)	4:44
5.	"Just Wanna Be Your Friend" (performed by Puck & Natty)	Puck; King Zen Amen	Jim Dean; Puck	3:52
6.	"Let Me Be Your Baby" (performed by Geoffrey Williams)	G. Williams; Pete Glenister	Glenister	4:56
7.	"Saving Forever for You" (performed by Shanice)	Diane Warren	David Foster	4:30
8.	"All the Way to Heaven" (performed by Jody Watley)	Warren	André Cymone	4:12
9.	"Why" (performed by Cathy Dennis with D-Mob)	Dennis; Dany Poku	Dancin' Danny D	4:57
10.	"Time to Be Lovers" (performed by Michael McDonald and Chaka Khan)	Tom Snow; Ken Miller	Russ Titelman	4:47
11.	"Action Speaks Louder than Words" (performed by Tara Kemp)	Snow; Miller	Tuhin Roy; Jake Smith	3:56
12.	"Theme From Beverly Hills, 90210" (performed by John Davis)	Davis	Davis	3:07

=== Certifications ===
Region	Certification	Certified units/sales
United States (RIAA)	Gold	500,000^{^}
^{^} Shipments figures based on certification alone.

== Beverly Hills 90210: The College Years ==
Beverly Hills 90210: The College Years

Soundtrack album by Various artists
- Released: September 20, 1994
- Recorded: 1994
- Genre: Pop
- Label: Giant / Warner Bros.

=== Track listing ===
1. "Make It Right" – Lisa Stansfield
2. "Not One More Time" – Stacy Piersa
3. "Every Day of the Week" – Jade
4. "Not Enough Hours in the Night" – After 7
5. "S.O.S." – D Mob with Cathy Dennis
6. "No Intermission" – 5th Power
7. "Cantaloop (Flip Fantasia)" – Us3
8. "Moving on Up" – M People
9. "Touch My Light" – Big Mountain
10. "I'll Love You Anyway" – Aaron Neville
11. "What Your Love Means to Me" – Hi-Five
12. "Forever Yours" – Wendy Moten

Release Date: September 20, 1994

This was released at the beginning of Beverly Hills, 90210's fifth season, although the cover art was from the fourth season. The costumes that the cast was wearing were the same costumes that they wore during the episode "Twenty Years Ago Today". "Twenty Years Ago Today" aired on October 27, 1993.

NOTE: This album was released on cassette tape as well as CD. The cassette tape cover art features Shannen Doherty (Brenda Walsh); however, the CD cover art features Doherty's replacement, Tiffani-Amber Thiessen (Valerie Malone).

== Beverly Hills 90210: Songs from the Peach Pit ==
Beverly Hills 90210: Songs from the Peach Pit

Soundtrack album by Various artists
- Released: 1996
- Genre: Pop
- Label: Rhino

=== Track listing ===
1. "Devil with a Blue Dress On & Good Golly Miss Molly" - Mitch Ryder & The Detroit Wheels
2. "You Really Got Me" - The Kinks
3. "Satisfaction" - Otis Redding
4. "Knock on Wood" - Eddie Floyd
5. "B-A-B-Y" - Carla Thomas
6. "The Beat Goes On" - Sonny & Cher
7. "How Can I Be Sure" - The Young Rascals
8. "Friday on My Mind" - The Easybeats
9. "Mony Mony" - Tommy James & The Shondells
10. "Pick Up the Pieces" - Average White Band
11. "What You Won't Do for Love" - Bobby Caldwell
12. "Slow Ride" - Foghat
13. "Strange Way" - Firefall
14. "Please Don't Go" - KC and the Sunshine Band
15. "Beverly Hills 90210" Theme - John E. Davis

Released: October 1, 1996
