= Inner Child (album) =

Studio album by Shanice
- Released: November 19, 1991
- Recorded: November 1990–September 1991
- Length: 59:36
- Label: Motown
- Producers: Narada Michael Walden; Hakeem Abdulsamad; Louis Biancaniello; Eric Daniels; Mike Mani

Shanice chronology
Discovery (1987)	Inner Child (1991)	21... Ways to Grow (1994)

Singles from Inner Child
- 1. "I Love Your Smile" Released: October 1991; 2. "I'm Cryin'" Released: February 1992; 3. "Silent Prayer" Released: April 1992; 4. "Lovin' You" Released: August 1992

Inner Child is the second studio album by American R&B singer Shanice. It was released on November 19, 1991, by Motown Records. The album peaked at number 13 on Billboard's Top R&B Albums chart and features a remake of Minnie Riperton's 1974 hit "Lovin' You" which hit number 59 on the R&B Singles chart in the summer of 1992. Shanice would cover the song for a second time on her 2006 album Every Woman Dreams. The UK version of the album features the Driza Bone remix of "I Love Your Smile" as track 14.

The lead single "I Love Your Smile" peaked at number two on the US Billboard Hot 100 and number one on the R&B charts. The other two singles, "I'm Cryin''" and her duet with Johnny Gill, "Silent Prayer", also proved to be successful on the R&B charts. The album was certified Gold making it Shanice's most successful album.

== Critical reception ==
Professional ratings
Review scores
Source	Rating
AllMusic	2.5/5 stars
Entertainment Weekly	C−
People	(favorable)
Rolling Stone	3.5/5 stars

AllMusic editor Tim Griggs wrote, "Fortunately, even though Shanice was just a teenager when she recorded this album, she doesn't overindulge in the falsetto like Carey did on her early releases. Unfortunately, she does overindulge in rapping, which is not her particular strength."

== Track listing ==
No.	Title	Writer(s)	Producer(s)	Length
1.	"Keep Your Inner Child Alive (Interlude)"	Narada Michael Walden; Sally Jo Dakota	Walden	1:24
2.	"I Love Your Smile"	Walden; Jarvis La Rue Baker; Shanice; Sylvester Jackson	Walden	4:19
3.	"Forever in Your Love"	Baker; Walden; Dakota	Walden; Louis Biancaniello	4:46
4.	"I'm Cryin'"	Dakota; Walden; Shanice	Walden	5:07
5.	"I Hate to Be Lonely"	Walden; Shanice; Biancaniello	Walden; Biancaniello	6:46
6.	"Stop Cheatin' on Me"	Baker; Walden; Shanice; Sandy Griffith; Claytoven Richardson	Walden; Biancaniello	4:50
7.	"Silent Prayer" (Duet with Johnny Gill)	Wilson; Walden; Jeffrey Cohen	Walden; Biancaniello	5:03
8.	"Peace in the World"	Baker; Dakota; Walden; Shanice	Walden	4:26
9.	"Lovin' You"	Minnie Riperton; Richard Rudolph	Walden	3:57
10.	"You Ain't All That"	Walden; Shanice; Biancaniello; Hathaway Pogue; Mike Mani	Walden; Mani	4:36
11.	"Shanice & Mookie Meet Homie (Interlude)"	Janice Wilson; Walden		0:23
12.	"You Didn't Think I'd Come Back This Hard"	Baker; Shanice; Mani; Eric Daniels	Daniels; Mani	3:39
13.	"You Were the One"	Shanice; Daryl Duncan; Kataya Anderson; Crystal Wilson	Walden; Biancaniello	5:21
14.	"I Love Your Smile (Hakeem's Mix)"	Walden; Baker; Shanice; Jackson; Chad Elliott; Rashad Smith	Hakeem Abdulsamad	4:16
15.	"Goodnight (Interlude)"	Walden; J. Wilson		0:23

== Personnel ==
- Shanice – vocals, spoken word, synthesizers
- Louis Biancaniello, Eric Daniels, Mike Mani, Claytoven Richardson – keyboards, programming, backing vocals
- Vernon "Ice" Black, Corrado Rustici, Ric Wilson – guitars
- Joel Smith – bass
- Narada Michael Walden – keyboards, synthesizers, programming, drums, percussion
- Branford Marsalis – saxophone
- Johnny Gill – spoken word
- Jarvis La Rue Baker, Kitty Beethoven, Zorana Edun, Nikita Germaine, Sandy Griffith, Chris Hawkins, Skyler Jett, Ellen Keating, Alyssa Lala, Tony Lindsey, Crystal Wilson – backing vocals
- String arrangements – Jerry Hey

== Charts ==
=== Weekly charts ===
Weekly chart performance for Inner Child
Chart (1992)	Peak position
Australian Albums (ARIA)	111
Austrian Albums (Ö3 Austria)	29
Canada Top Albums/CDs (RPM)	89
Dutch Albums (Album Top 100)	29
European Albums (Music & Media)	17
German Albums (Offizielle Top 100)	9
Japanese Albums (Oricon)	35
Norwegian Albums (VG-lista)	16
Swedish Albums (Sverigetopplistan)	17
Swiss Albums (Schweizer Hitparade)	12
UK Albums (Official Charts)	21
US Billboard 200	83
US Top R&B/Hip-Hop Albums (Billboard)	13

=== Year-end charts ===
Year-end chart performance for Inner Child
Chart (1992)	Position
German Albums (Offizielle Top 100)	100
US Top R&B/Hip-Hop Albums (Billboard)	19

== Certifications ==
Certifications for Inner Child
Region	Certification	Certified units/sales
United States (RIAA)	Gold	500,000^{^}
^{^} Shipments figures based on certification alone.
