= It's for You (Shanice song) =

1993 single by Shanice

Single by Shanice

from the album Meteor Man
- Released: July 13, 1993
- Length: 4:05
- Label: Motown
- Songwriters: Eric Kirkland; Michael Angelo Saulsberry; Shanice Wilson
- Producers: Eric Kirkland; Michael Angelo Saulsberry

Shanice singles chronology
"Saving Forever for You" (1992)	"It's for You" (1993)	"Somewhere" (1994)

"It's for You" is a song by American singer and songwriter Shanice, produced by Eric Kirkland and Michael Angelo Saulsberry of Portrait with drum programming by Maurice Thompson. It features a rap verse from Brett Bouldin and was released in July 1993 by Motown from the soundtrack of the 1993 film The Meteor Man. The song became another moderate hit for the singer and a music video was also filmed. Shanice performed "It's for You" on the Family Matters episode "Rock Enroll", which originally aired on January 7, 1994.

== Critical reception ==
Larry Flick from Billboard magazine wrote that the song "places Shanice's crystalline voice inside a romantic pop/R&B shuffle tune." He added, "Complemented by Brett Bouldin's understated rap, singer strikes a more mature and soulful stance than on recent efforts. Tightly woven background harmonies create a soothing and dreamy mood. Top 40 and urban radio programmers have already begun to embrace this sparkling jewel of a single. A summery delight."

== Track listing ==
- 12-inch single

A1. "It's for You" (LP version) – 4:05
A2. "It's for You" (Street mix) – 4:34
A3. "It's for You" (Mike's Swazza mix) – 4:32
B1. "It's for You" (Bassapella) – 4:31
B2. "It's for You" (LP instrumental) – 4:05

== Charts ==
=== Weekly charts ===
Chart (1993)	Peak position
Australia (ARIA)	157
US Billboard Hot 100	57
US 12-inch Singles Sales (Billboard)	33
US Hot R&B Singles (Billboard)	14
US Top 40/Rhythm-Crossover (Billboard)	21
US Cash Box Top 100	55

=== Year-end charts ===
Chart (1993)	Position
US Hot R&B Singles (Billboard)	78

== Release history ==
Region	Date	Format(s)	Label(s)	Ref.
United States	July 13, 1993	—N/a	Motown	
Japan	August 25, 1993	Mini-CD	Motown	
Australia	October 11, 1993	CD; cassette	Motown; Polydor	
