= Every Woman Dreams =

2006 album by American R&B artist Shanice

Studio album by Shanice
- Released: February 21, 2006
- Length: 59:46
- Labels: Imajah; PlayTyme; ADA
- Producers: John Barnes; Bud'da; Mike City; Jamey Jaz; PMG; Shanice

Shanice chronology
| Ultimate Collection (1999) | Every Woman Dreams (2006) |

Singles from Every Woman Dreams
- 1. "Every Woman Dreams" Released: January 26, 2006; 2. "Take Care Of U" Released: June 27, 2006; 3. "So Sexy" Released: August 30, 2006

Every Woman Dreams is the fifth studio album by American R&B singer Shanice. It was released on February 21, 2006, on her independent label Imajah/PlayTyme. Shanice's first release following her eight-year hiatus since her last album in 1999 on LaFace Records, the album debuted at number 194 on US Billboard 200 and number 30 on the R&B/Hip-Hop Albums chart with first-week sales of 5,901 copies. Two singles from the album were released: "Every Woman Dreams" and "Take Care of U".

== Critical reception ==
AllMusic called the album "a polished and wholly accessible record. [Shanice's] marvelous voice sounds better than ever, and the music, which is sensual and energetic at once, should please fans of contemporary R&B." Chris Rizik from SoulTracks found that "a spin of the disc displays what appears to be two distinct, almost dichotomous albums: One a fairly bland effort at Vivian Green-like modern R&B and one a more classic pop/soul disc that highlights Shanice's formidable vocal prowess. Unfortunately you have to wade through the first to get to the second."

== Track listing ==
Every Woman Dreams track listing
| No. | Title | Writer(s) | Producer(s) | Length |
|---|---|---|---|---|
| 1. | "Intro" | Rain Denise Wilson; Dominic Rodriguez; Richard Garcia; Tony Minter | dom; Ruk; T-Nyse | 1:00 |
| 2. | "Get Up" (featuring Tahir Jahi & Sheila E.) | Cynthia Wilson; Rodriguez; Helena Wyche; Marc A. Knox; Garcia; Shanice Knox; Tahir Jahi Wilson; Minter | PMG; Shanice | 4:50 |
| 3. | "Every Woman Dreams" | C. Wilson; Rodriguez; Kataya "Mookie" Anderson; M. Knox; Garcia; S. Knox; Minter | PMG; Shanice | 5:40 |
| 4. | "Things in the Movies" | Bud'da; M. Knox; S. Knox | Bud'da; Shanice | 4:02 |
| 5. | "Keep It to Yourself" | Rodriguez; Anderson; M. Knox; S. Knox; Garcia; Minter | PMG; Shanice | 3:36 |
| 6. | "Take Care Of U" | C. Wilson; Rodriguez; Anderson; M. Knox; S. Knox; Garcia; Minter | PMG; Shanice | 4:25 |
| 7. | "So Sexy" (featuring Karif) | Rodriguez; Karif Knox; S. Knox; Garcia; Minter | PMG; Shanice | 4:00 |
| 8. | "That's Why I Love You" | Michael Flowers | Mike City | 3:44 |
| 9. | "Crazy 4 U" | Jamey Jaz; S. Knox | Jaz | 3:06 |
| 10. | "So Free"" | Jamey Jaz; S. Knox | Jaz | 4:23 |
| 11. | "Chocolate" | Jamey Jaz; S. Knox; Rahsaan Patterson | Jaz | 4:53 |
| 12. | "Loving You" | Minnie Riperton; Richard Rudolph | John Barnes; Shanice^{[a]} | 4:38 |
| 13. | "Forever Like a Rose" | Jamey Jaz; S. Knox | Jaz | 4:25 |
| 14. | "I Can't Imagine" | Jaz; S. Knox; Patterson | Strong; Clemons | 4:56 |
| 15. | "Joy" | Jamey Jaz; S. Knox | Jaz | 4:26 |
| 16. | "Outro" | R. Wilson; Rodriguez; Garcia; Minter* | dom; Ruk; T-Nyse | 1:31 |
| Total length: | | | | 59:46 |

Notes

- ^{^a} denotes co-producer

== Charts ==
Weekly chart performance for Every Woman Dreams
| Chart (2006) | Peak position |
|---|---|
| US Billboard 200 | 194 |
| US Independent Albums (Billboard) | 20 |
| US Top R&B/Hip-Hop Albums (Billboard) | 30 |

== Release history ==
Release history and formats for Every Woman Dreams
| Region | Date | Format | Label | Ref(s) |
|---|---|---|---|---|
| United States | February 21, 2006 | CD; Digital download | Imajah; PlayTyme; ADA | |
