= I'm Cryin' =

1992 single by Shanice

Single by Shanice

from the album Inner Child
- Released: February 18, 1992
- Genre: R&B
- Length: 5:07
- Label: Motown
- Songwriters: Shanice Wilson; Sally Jo Dakota; Narada Michael Walden
- Producer: Narada Michael Walden

Shanice singles chronology
"I Love Your Smile" (1991)	"I'm Cryin'" (1992)	"Silent Prayer" (1992)

"I'm Cryin'" is a song by American singer-songwriter Shanice, released in February 1992 by Motown Records as the second single from her second album, Inner Child (1991). Produced by Narada Michael Walden, who also co-wrote the lyrics, it was the follow-up to her highly successful single "I Love Your Smile". The song peaked at number 11 on the US Billboard Hot R&B Singles chart.

== Critical reception ==
Larry Flick from Billboard magazine wrote, "Pop/urban ingenue follows the giddy 'I Love Your Smile' with a mature and sensitive ballad. Grand production by Walden inspires a powerful vocal performance, which should help build momentum at several radio formats." Michael Eric Dyson from Rolling Stone described the song as "a piercing lamentation of lost love, [that] slowly builds to a wailing climax."

== Track listing ==
- CD single
1. Radio Edit (3:46)
2. Full Version (5:03)
3. Instrumental (5:02)

== Charts ==
Chart (1992)	Peak position
Australia (ARIA)	140
Germany (GfK)	47
Netherlands (Single Top 100)	69
US Hot R&B Singles (Billboard)	11

== Release history ==
Region	Date	Format(s)	Label(s)	Ref.
United States	February 18, 1992	—N/a	Motown	
Japan	May 25, 1992	Mini-CD	Motown	
Australia	June 22, 1992	CD; cassette	Motown	
