= I Wish (Shanice song) =

Single by Shanice

from the album 21... Ways to Grow
- Released: August 21, 1994
- Genre: R&B
- Length: 5:56
- Label: Motown
- Songwriter(s): Lance Alexander; Tony Tolbert
- Producer(s): Lance Alexander; Prof T.

Shanice singles chronology
"I Like" (1994)	"I Wish" (1994)	"If I Never Knew You" (1995)

"I Wish" is a song by American singer-songwriter Shanice, released in August 1994 by Motown Records as the fourth single from her third album, 21... Ways to Grow (1994). The song is written by Lance Alexander and Tony Tolbert, and produced by Alexander with Prof T. It peaked at number 61 on the US Billboard Hot R&B Singles chart. A music video was produced, however, the original version of the song was not used for the video, the "No Stokes Remix" was the one that was used instead.

== Critical reception ==
Larry Flick from Billboard magazine wrote, "WIth each track, Shanice moves closer to establishing herself as a chanteuse capable of adult fare. On the well-structured ballad, her voice is layered to create an airy cushion for a lead performance that slowly progresses from quietly wistful to booming and assured. With justice, this engaging effort will connect with programmers who have been indulging in the hip-hop balladry of Aaliyah and Brandy."

== Track listing ==
- 12-inch single

A1. "I Wish" (Radio Edit) (3:49)
A1. "I Wish" (LP Version) (5:56)
A1. "I Wish" (TV Track) (5:56)
A1. "I Wish" (Pop Edit) (3:36)

== Charts ==
Chart (1994)	Peak position
US Hot R&B Singles (Billboard)	61
