= Turn Down the Lights =

Single by Shanice

from the album 21... Ways to Grow
- Released: July 26, 1994
- Genre: R&B
- Length: 4:30
- Label: Motown
- Songwriters: Bo Watson; McArthur
- Producers: Bo Watson; McArthur; Babyface

Shanice singles chronology
"Somewhere" (1994)	"Turn Down the Lights" (1994)	"I Like" (1994)

"Turn Down the Lights" is a song by American singer-songwriter Shanice, released in July 1994 by Motown Records as the second single from her third album, 21... Ways to Grow (1994). A music video was produced to accompany the song. The remixes can be viewed on YouTube.

== Critical reception ==
Larry Flick from Billboard magazine wrote, "Swaying R&B ballad from the current 21... album is ample testimony to Shanice's growth and maturity as a song stylist. The girlish vibe of past singles has been replaced by adult subject matter that suits her well-honed soprano pipes extremely well. The best news of all is that Shanice has not defined womanhood by playing the role of sex kitten, as so many do. Instead, seduction equals romance. Simply lovely."

== Track listing ==
"Turn Down the Lights" Remixes

Promo CD Single and 12" Vinyl Single

- 1. "Turn Down the Lights" (Live Version Edit) [4:16]
- 2. "Turn Down the Lights" (Midnight Mix Edit) [3:55]
- 3. "Turn Down the Lights" (S.O.C. Remix w/o Rap Edit) [3:55]
- 4. "Turn Down the Lights" (S.O.C. Remix w/ Rap Edit) [3:55]
- 5. "Turn Down the Lights" (Focus LP Edit) [3:50]
- 6. "Turn Down the Lights" (LP Version) [4:31]

== Charts ==
Chart (1994)	Peak position
US Hot R&B Singles (Billboard)	21
