= I Love Your Smile =

1991 single by Shanice

Single by Shanice

from the album Inner Child
- Released: October 1991
- Genre: R&B; new jack swing
- Length: 4:19 (album version); 3:56 (radio version); 3:50 (Driza Bone single remix)
- Label: Motown
- Songwriters: Jarvis La Rue Baker; Sylvester Jackson; Narada Michael Walden; Shanice Wilson
- Producer: Narada Michael Walden

Shanice singles chronology
"This Time" (1988)	"I Love Your Smile" (1991)	"I'm Cryin'" (1992)

Music video
- "I Love Your Smile" on YouTube

"I Love Your Smile" is a song by the American singer-songwriter Shanice, released in October 1991 by Motown Records as the lead single from her second album, Inner Child (1991). Produced by Narada Michael Walden, the shorter radio version removes Shanice's rap bridge from the album version. It features a saxophone solo by Branford Marsalis as well as laughter from Janet Jackson and René Elizondo Jr. near the end of the song. "I Love Your Smile" is Shanice's best known and most successful hit.

"I Love Your Smile" peaked at number two on the US Billboard Hot 100 on February 1, 1992, and it topped the Billboard Hot R&B Singles chart for four weeks in December 1991 and January 1992. In Europe, "I Love Your Smile" peaked at number two on the UK Singles Chart after being remixed by Driza Bone and reached number one on the Dutch Top 40 in the Netherlands. The accompanying music video features Shanice in a studio having pictures taken by a photographer. In 1992, "I Love Your Smile" was nominated for a Grammy Award for Best Female R&B Vocal Performance. Shanice performed the song as the first musical guest on The Tonight Show with Jay Leno on May 25, 1992.

== Critical reception ==
AllMusic editor Tim Griggs named "I Love Your Smile" a "standout" from Inner Child. J.D. Considine from The Baltimore Sun felt that here, Narada Michael Walden "gets a knock-out performance" from Shanice. He added that her "sunny delivery, backed by a breezy, Euro-pop arrangement and a rock-steady appearance by saxophonist Branford Marsalis, makes this the kind of tune you wouldn't expect from anyone still in Clearasil's primary target group." Larry Flick from Billboard magazine described it as a "slinky R&B tune", remarking that Shanice's "matured voice sounds like a cross between Chaka Khan and Janet Jackson, sprawling out comfortably over a subtle and percussive groove that is framed with warm sax lines." DeVaney and Clark from Cashbox stated, "Compared to her previous projects, you can clearly tell that Wilson has matured both musically and vocally to take this project to its limits." Martin Johnson from Chicago Reader named it "an ideal guilty pleasure". A reviewer from Ealing Leader found that "this little bundle of dynamite shows great promise with a warm debut single." Swedish Expressen noted its "whispering happy jingle".

Dave Sholin from the Gavin Report wrote, "Only in her teens, Shanice Wilson is anything but a newcomer, having arrived on the scene in the late eighties and scoring instant airplay. But this should be the effort that really sparks her career." Lakeland Ledger described her voice as "playful and spunky". Alan Jones from Music Week's RM Dance Update declared it as "a likeable and highly commercial pop/dance workout, [and] it will doubtless be a hit on both sides of the Atlantic." Another RM editor, James Hamilton, called it a "delightful breathily gurgling, humming, whistling, tinkling and (Branford Marsalis's jazz sax) tooting jiggly jogging cheerful swayer". A reviewer from People Magazine stated that it "has risen to the top of the R&B charts on its jaunty, literally bells-and-whistles riff, its jazzy a cappella refrain and a walloping beat." Michael Eric Dyson from Rolling Stone named it "a sparkling midtempo confession of love" framed by Marsalis' sax. Mark Frith from Smash Hits praised it as an "infectious swingbeat tune", giving it four out of five. Jonathan Bernstein from Spin felt that Shanice "brought sheer, unalloyed joy to the charts and our hearts with her "I Love Your Smile". Exuberance isn't a feature of too many records these days—maybe some Helmet, the early stuff—but this singer sounded giddy with delight on her hit."

== Impact and legacy ==
NME ranked "I Love Your Smile" number 50 in their list of "Singles of the Year" in December 1992. Bruce Pollock featured it in his 2005 book, The 7,500 Most Important Songs of 1944-2000. Polish Porcys ranked "I Love Your Smile" number 46 in their list of "100 Singles 1990–1999" in 2012, writing, "The career of the singer did not flourish somehow stunning, but this one song, this one "turutututururu" is immortal. This sweet chorus has probably one of the most naturally catchy melodies of all time." The song was on the 10,001 Songs You Must Hear list in the 2014 book 1,001 Songs You Must Hear Before You Die.

== Track listings ==
- 7-inch single
1. "I Love Your Smile" (radio version) – 3:46
2. "I Love Your Smile" (instrumental) – 4:14
- 7-inch single—Driza Bone remix
1. "I Love Your Smile" (Driza Bone single remix) – 3:50
2. "I Love Your Smile" (original version) – 3:46
- CD single 1
1. "I Love Your Smile" (radio version) – 3:46
2. "I Love Your Smile" (extended version) – 4:14
3. "I Love Your Smile" (instrumental) – 4:14
- CD single 2
1. "I Love Your Smile" (Driza Bone single remix)
2. "I Love Your Smile" (Driza Bone club mix)
3. "I Love Your Smile" (Driza Bone dub mix)
4. "I Love Your Smile" (original single version)

== Personnel ==
- All vocals and rap by Shanice Wilson
- Drums and programming by Narada Michael Walden
- Keyboards, drum programming, programming and synthesized bass by Louis Biancaniello
- Saxophone solo by Branford Marsalis
- Background vocals by Alyssa Lala, Crystal Wilson, David A. Miguel, Jack McAdoo, David Lee, Diamond D, Eric Daniels, Jarvis La Rue Baker, Kathy Horton, Label Atkinson, Lisa Walden, Mike Mani

== Charts ==
=== Weekly charts ===
Chart (1991–1992)	Peak position
Australia (ARIA)	8
Austria (Ö3 Austria Top 40)	6
Belgium (Ultratop 50 Flanders)	5
Canada Retail Singles (The Record)	2
Canada Top Singles (RPM)	13
Denmark (IFPI)	5
Europe (Eurochart Hot 100)	2
Europe (European Dance Radio)	1
Europe (European Hit Radio)	2
France (SNEP)	7
Germany (GfK)	2
Ireland (IRMA)	8
Israel (Israeli Singles Chart)	9
Italy (Musica e dischi)	23
Netherlands (Dutch Top 40)	1
Netherlands (Single Top 100)	4
New Zealand (Recorded Music NZ)	6
Norway (VG-lista)	2
Spain (AFYVE)	9
Sweden (Sverigetopplistan)	4
Switzerland (Schweizer Hitparade)	3
UK Singles (Official Charts)	55
UK Singles (Official Charts) Remix	2
UK Airplay (Music Week) 1991	23
UK Airplay (Music Week) 1992	2
UK Dance (Music Week)	11
UK Dance (Music Week) Remix	4
UK Club Chart (Music Week)	43
UK Club Chart (Music Week) Remix	15
US Billboard Hot 100	2
US Adult Contemporary (Billboard)	50
US Hot R&B Singles (Billboard)	1
US Cash Box Top 100	2
Zimbabwe (ZIMA)	1

=== Year-end charts ===
Chart (1992)	Position
Australia (ARIA)	89
Belgium (Ultratop)	32
Europe (Eurochart Hot 100)	16
Europe (European Dance Radio)	2
Europe (European Hit Radio)	9
Germany (Media Control)	22
Netherlands (Dutch Top 40)	67
Netherlands (Single Top 100)	38
Sweden (Topplistan)	30
Switzerland (Schweizer Hitparade)	16
UK Singles (OCC)	24
UK Airplay (Music Week)	16
US Billboard Hot 100	11
US Hot R&B Singles (Billboard)	12

== Certifications ==
Region	Certification	Certified units/sales
United Kingdom (BPI)	Silver	200,000^{‡}
^{‡} Sales+streaming figures based on certification alone.

== Release history ==
Region	Version	Date	Format(s)	Label(s)	Ref.
United States	Original	October 1991	Cassette	Motown	
United Kingdom	Original	November 11, 1991	7-inch vinyl; 12-inch vinyl; cassette	Motown	
United Kingdom	Original	November 18, 1991	CD	Motown	
United Kingdom	Driza Bone remix	February 10, 1992	7-inch vinyl; 12-inch vinyl; CD; cassette	Motown	
Australia	Original	March 16, 1992	CD; cassette	Motown; Polydor	
Japan	Original	March 25, 1992	Mini-CD	Motown	

== See also ==
- List of number-one R&B singles of 1991 (U.S.)
- List of number-one R&B singles of 1992 (U.S.)
- Dutch Top 40 number-one hits of 1992
