= Silent Prayer =

- Cassette cover

Single by Shanice featuring Johnny Gill

from the album Inner Child
- B-side: "Lovin' You"
- Released: April 28, 1992
- Recorded: November 1990
- Studio: Tarpan Studios (San Rafael, CA)
- Genre: R&B
- Length: 5:04
- Label: Motown
- Songwriter(s): Narada Michael Walden; Jeffrey Cohen
- Producer(s): Narada Michael Walden; Louis Biancaniello

Shanice singles chronology
"I'm Cryin'" (1992)	"Silent Prayer" (1992)	"Lovin' You" (1992)

"Silent Prayer" is a song by American singer-songwriter Shanice featuring Johnny Gill. It was released in April 1992 as the third single from her second album, Inner Child (1991). The song peaked at number 31 on the US Billboard Hot 100 and number four on the Billboard Hot R&B/Hip-Hop Songs chart.

== Critical reception ==
Michael Eric Dyson from Rolling Stone remarked that on the song, "Shanice is supported by Johnny Gill's earthy melisma."

== Track listing ==
- 7" single

A1. "Silent Prayer"
B1. "Loving You"

- 12" single

A1. Radio Edit
A2. Full Version
B1. Instrumental

== Charts ==
=== Weekly charts ===
Chart (1992)	Peak position
US Billboard Hot 100 (Billboard)	31
US Hot R&B/Hip-Hop Songs (Billboard)	4

=== Year-end charts ===
Chart (1992)	Position
US Hot R&B/Hip-Hop Songs (Billboard)	47
