= Somewhere (Shanice song) =

1994 single by Shanice

Single by Shanice

from the album 21... Ways to Grow
- Released: May 17, 1994
- Genre: Funk; hip-hop
- Length: 4:13
- Label: Motown
- Songwriters: Christopher Williams; Shanice Wilson; Kiyamma Griffin; Ike Lee III
- Producers: Christopher Williams; Kiyamma Griffin; Ike Lee III

Shanice singles chronology
"It's for You" (1993)	"Somewhere" (1994)	"Turn Down the Lights" (1994)

Music video
- "Somewhere" on YouTube

"Somewhere" is a song by American singer-songwriter and actress Shanice, released in May 1994 by Motown Records as the lead single from her third album, 21... Ways to Grow (1994). The song was written by Shanice along with its producers: Christopher Williams, Kiyamma Griffin, and Ike Lee III. It reached number 28 on the US Billboard Hot R&B Singles chart. The accompanying music video was directed by American film director Antoine Fuqua, featuring Shanice dancing and singing in a night club.

== Critical reception ==
Upon the release, Larry Flick from Billboard magazine wrote, "Shanice ushers in her cool new 21... Ways to Grow set with a slammin' funk/hip-hop jumper that reveals a more flexible and oh-so-womanly voice. Track glides along at a sassy clip that may remind some of Mary J. Blige, though its overall bright tone and musical complexity will put naysayers in check pretty fast. By the end of the first spin, you'll be humming the hook. Should be among the primary singles on the top 40 soundtrack of this summer."

Troy J. Augusto from Cash Box commented, "Promising R&B singer looks to make her move to the top o' the charts with this hardhitting, funky hip-hop number that oozes with radio accessibility and dance-floor hook. A big jump for Shanice, whose forthcoming 21... Wavs album just may be the one to put her in the big leagues with Mariah, Janet, Toni, et al. Bright, bouncy tune reflects serious maturation from the singer's earlier material. Could be the start of something quite big." Martin Johnson from Chicago Reader remarked that on the album's "most natural-sounding tracks", as "Somewhere", "she sounds self-assured and determined to elaborate her priorities."

== Track listing ==
- 12-inch single

A1. "Somewhere" (Nothin' But Da Funk Mix) (4:16)
A2. "Somewhere" (LP Version) (4:10)
A3. "Somewhere" (Instrumental) (5:08)
B1. "Somewhere" (Deep Soul Mix) (5:08)
B2. "Somewhere" (A Capella) (4:13)

- CD single
1. "Somewhere" (Nothin' But Da Funk Mix) [4:18]
2. "Somewhere" (Deep Soul Mix) [5:11]
3. "Somewhere" (LP Version) [4:15]
4. "Somewhere" (Instrumental) [5:08]

== Charts ==
Chart (1994)	Peak position
Canada Retail Singles (The Record)	16
US Hot R&B Singles (Billboard)	28

== Release history ==
Region	Date	Format(s)	Label(s)	Ref.
United States	May 17, 1994	—N/a	Motown	
Japan	June 20, 1994	Mini-CD	Motown	
Australia	July 25, 1994	CD; cassette	Motown; Polydor	
