= Bryan Loren =

American songwriter (1966–2026)

Background information
- Also known as: The Wiz
- Born: Bryan Loren Hudson; May 5, 1966; Long Island, New York, U.S.
- Died: January 28, 2026 (aged 59) Los Angeles, California, U.S.
- Genres: Electronica; R&B; funk; soul; pop
- Occupations: Singer-songwriter; record producer
- Years active: 1981–2026
- Labels: Philly World; Arista; BBR
- Formerly of: Fat Larry's Band

Bryan Loren Hudson (May 5, 1966 – January 28, 2026), also nicknamed The Wiz, was an American singer-songwriter and record producer. He produced and wrote The Simpsons' 1990 single "Do the Bartman", and released the 1984 singles "Lollipop Luv" and "Do You Really Love Me?", which peaked at numbers 23 and 64 on the Hot R&B/Hip-Hop Songs chart—where the latter remained for 17 weeks. He also worked with artists including Michael Jackson, Whitney Houston, Sting, and Eric Benét.

== Early years ==
Bryan Loren was born on Long Island, New York, on May 5, 1966. He moved to South Philadelphia at a young age. Loren became interested in music at age 5 and began playing drums and other instruments. He was eventually able to play all of the instruments used for recording a complete album. Loren said that he remembers being influenced by the South Philly music scene, recalling "TSOP", Philadelphia International and songwriting artists Stevie Wonder, Steely Dan and Herbie Hancock as specific inspiring examples.

== Music career ==
When Hudson was offered a solo recording contract, he began professionally using Bryan Loren for his attributions. This became the moniker Loren used throughout his music career. Loren began pursuing music professionally from a young age. He was able to compose music by age 12, was a professional session artist from age 15, and even signed his first recording contract at age 17.

=== As Bryan Hudson ===
From 1981, Loren was a session musician at Alpha International Studios. While there, Loren recorded professionally under the tutelage of Nick Martinelli. He recorded with artists and ensembles such as Nona Hendryx, Tavares, and Harold Melvin and the Blue Notes. His credits are as Bryan Hudson for all of his early musical contributions.

=== Fat Larry's Band ===
Fat Larry's Band was the first band that Loren joined as a member. He played synthesizers, and recorded on their 1982 album Breakin' Out and 1983's Straight from the Heart. This is where Loren coined the nickname "The Wiz" for his keyboard wizardry. The success of these recordings warranted a national album tour, but Loren was too young to join them on the road. He was replaced in the band, though he would record with Fat Larry's Band again; in 1986 for their album, Nice.

=== Cashmere ===
Loren was also a member of Cashmere where he composed music for the 1983 album, Let the Music Turn You On. Loren provided backing vocals as well, showing himself as a talented vocalist. The owner of Alpha International Studios took notice of Loren's potential, offering him a solo recording contract with Philly World Records. Loren signed the contract, and began performing as Bryan Loren. This would endure as his professional name throughout the rest of his career.

=== As Bryan Loren ===
In 1984, Loren released his self-titled debut on Philly World Records. The album featured two hit singles "Lollipop Luv", which peaked at number 23 on Billboard's R&B chart, and "Do You Really Love Me", peaking at number 68. Loren performed and recorded all of the music and vocal tracks on the debut album; handling all executive production, mixing, and engineering for the initial release. The album, Bryan Loren, was re-released in 2012 by BBR Records.

In 1992, Loren released a follow-up solo album on Arista Records called Music from the New World. One song, "To Satisfy You", featured Michael Jackson on background vocals. According to an excerpt from Kit O'Toole's book, Michael Jackson FAQ: All That's Left to Know About the King of Pop, Jackson passed on this song when presented by Loren during the Dangerous sessions, but agreed to sing backup when Loren kept the song for himself. This song was later renamed "Satisfy You" and covered by Damion Hall, a former member of the new jack swing group Guy, for his solo album Straight to the Point in 1994. His version also featured Chantè Moore. "Doesn't Mean That I Don't Love You" had a brief stint on Billboard as this album's only known single. It is also known, according to an upload on Loren's Myspace page, that "For You" was initially given to Janet Jackson during the Rhythm Nation 1814 sessions in 1989. Under the title "Work", the demo was eventually not used, despite its industrial-mechanical feel. Music from the New World was released commercially only in Japan.

=== Collaborations ===
Loren collaborated with other top recording artists including in 1990, when he produced, sang background vocals on, and co-wrote (along with an uncredited Michael Jackson) the song "Do the Bartman" from The Simpsons Sing the Blues. Jackson was a fan of The Simpsons, and had agreed to write a song for the planned release of The Simpsons Sing the Blues, but because he had recently signed a lucrative deal with Sony Records, giving them exclusivity in exchange for what the Guinness Book of Records recognized as the largest contract ever, reportedly worth $890 million, and the Simpsons album was being released on Geffen Records, Jackson chose to not be credited in any manner on the album. "Do the Bartman" became a number one hit in several countries, reached number 2 in the Netherlands, and number 4 in Belgium. Though it was never released as a single in the US, it did spend nine weeks on Billboard's airplay chart, peaking at number 11. Loren worked with Jackson again, in 1991, on Jackson's album Dangerous. He played drums, and other percussion instruments, on that album. He continued writing songs for other performers, including Whitney Houston's "Feels So Good", and producing music with other well known artists, such as Damion Hall, Eric Benét, Barry White, and Sting.

== Death ==
Loren died in Los Angeles on January 28, 2026, at the age of 59 from atherosclerotic heart disease. His friend Shana Mangatal announced the news of his death on Facebook. (Note: Some sources mislabel his age as "58".)

== Awards ==
In 1990, Loren won the Sony Innovator's award in Sound as reported in July's issue of Ebony. In giving the award, George Benson said of Loren: "Bryan's got the power of talent, his imagination will take him far", concluding with "We're betting on it."

== Discography ==
Studio albums

- Bryan Loren (1984)
- Music from the New World (1992)

Collaborations With Michael Jackson

- "All the Truth"
- "Bubbles" - leaked
- "Call It Off"
- "Can't Come Back"
- "Don't Believe It" - snippet leaked by Shana Mangatal
- "Dream Girl" - leaked
- "Family Thing" - leaked
- "Garbage" - leaked
- "Homeless Bound" - leaked
- "House Groove"
- "Janet and MJ Duet"
- "Man in Black" - leaked
- "Pressure"
- "Pretty Face"
- "Serious Effect" (feat. LL Cool J) - leaked
- "Serious Moonlight"
- "Seven Digits" - snippet leaked
- "She Got It" - leaked
- "She's Got It Baby"
- "Son of Thriller"
- "Stay"
- "Superfly Sister" - released on Jackson's Blood on the Dance Floor: HIStory in the Mix
- "Tree of Life"
- "The Choice" (aka Mind is the Magic) - single released as Mind is the Magic
- "The Verdict" - leaked
- "To Satisfy You" - released on Music From the World
- "Truth on Youth"
- "Work That Body" - leaked
