= Shanice =

American singer-songwriter (born 1973)

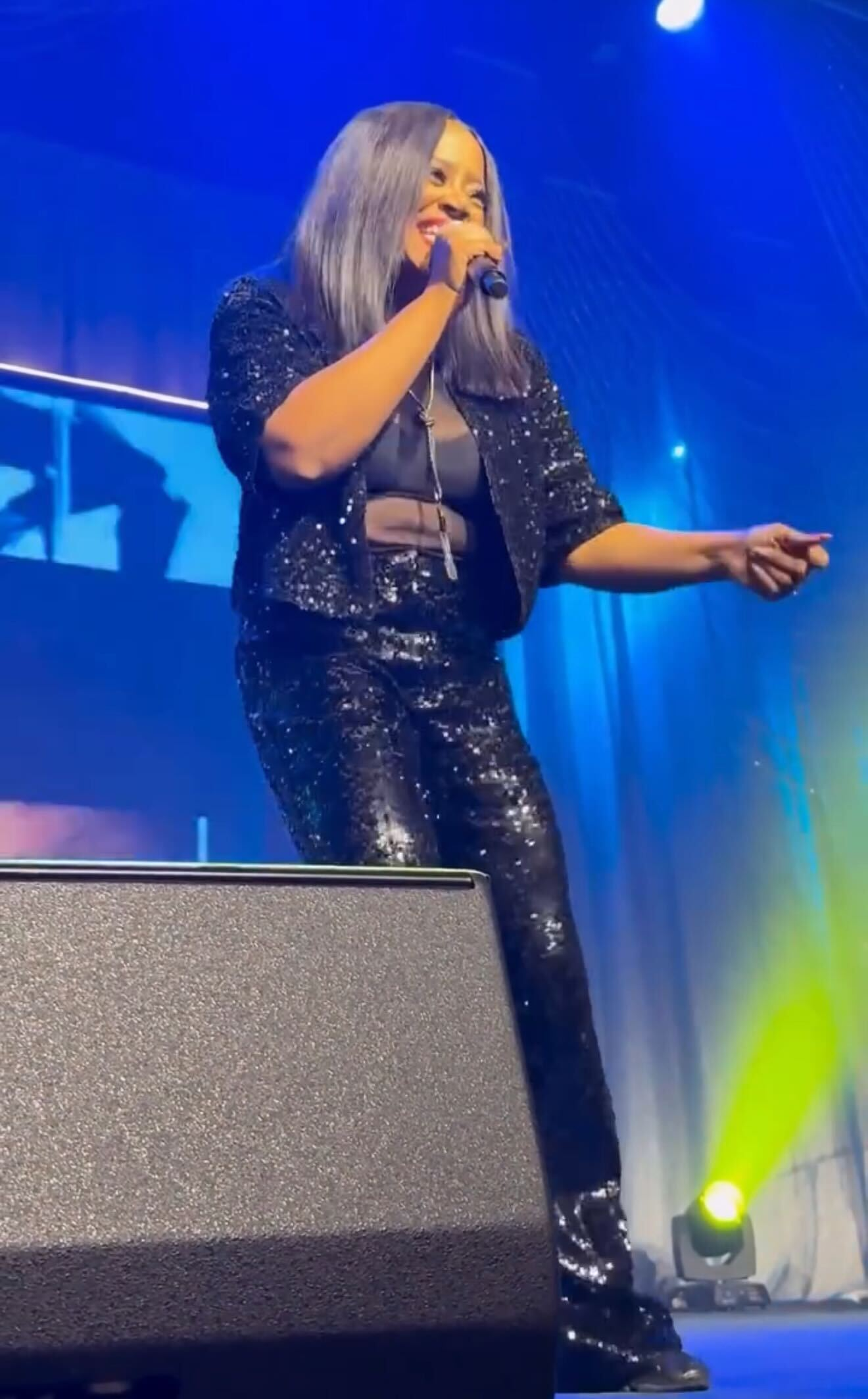
- Shanice performing in 2025
- Born: Shanice Lorraine Wilson; May 14, 1973 (age 53); Pittsburgh, Pennsylvania, U.S.
- Occupations: Singer; songwriter; record producer; actress
- Years active: 1984–present
- Spouse: Flex Alexander (m. 2000)
- Children: 2
- Musical career
- Genres: R&B; soul; new jack swing
- Instruments: Vocals; piano
- Labels: Imajah; Heritage Music Group; PlayTyme; LaFace; Motown; A&M

Shanice Lorraine Wilson-Knox (born May 14, 1973) is an American singer, songwriter, record producer, and actress. She is recognized for her coloratura soprano voice.

In 1984, Shanice appeared on Star Search at age eleven and won in the Junior Vocalist category. Her success led to being signed to A&M Records and released her debut album Discovery in 1987, at age fourteen. The album spawned the top-ten R&B hits: "(Baby Tell Me) Can You Dance" and "No 1/2 Steppin'". After a label roster shift to Motown Records, she released her second album Inner Child in 1991. The album spawned the international chart-topping song "I Love Your Smile". The song also garnered a nomination for Best Female R&B Vocal Performance at the 35th Annual Grammy Awards. Her single titled "Saving Forever for You", released on the Beverly Hills, 90210, peaked at number four on the US Billboard Hot 100. After releasing her third album, 21... Ways to Grow (1994), she went on a five-year hiatus. During her hiatus, Shanice performed background vocals for several chart-topping songs including "Un-Break My Heart" and "When You Believe". She also made her acting debut in the Broadway production of Les Misérables in 1997.

In March 1999, she released her self-titled album on LaFace Records. The album spawned the top-ten song "When I Close My Eyes". Shortly after the release of the album, Shanice went on another musical hiatus. After forming her own record label Imajah Records, she released her fifth studio album Every Woman Dreams (2006). In 2014, she starred alongside her husband Flex Alexander in the reality television series Flex & Shanice.

== Early life ==
Shanice Lorraine Wilson was born in Pittsburgh, Pennsylvania, on May 14, 1973. Her mother, Crystal Wilson, was a singer, while her father, Carl Black, was a guitarist. After her parents divorced in 1979, Shanice relocated to Los Angeles with her mother and her aunt Penni Wilson. At the age of nine, she appeared alongside American singer Ella Fitzgerald in a commercial for Kentucky Fried Chicken. She later attended South Pasadena High School.

== Career ==
=== 1984–1989: Career beginnings ===
In 1984, Shanice competed Star Search, the largest national talent show on television at the time. Competing in the show's Junior Vocalist category, Shanice won the grand prize of US$5,000 with her renditions of "Somewhere Over the Rainbow" and "Greatest Love of All". In September 1984, she became part of cast for season one of American children's television program Kids Incorporated. The following year, she began performing in the Westwood Playhouse musical Get Happy, which celebrated the music of Harold Arlen. John McClain, an executive from A&M Records, attended one of her performances and signed her to A&M Records at the age of eleven. Released on October 21, 1987, her debut album Discovery peaked at number 149 on the US Billboard 200. The album's lead single, "(Baby Tell Me) Can You Dance", became a top-ten R&B hit and peaked at number fifty on the US Billboard Hot 100. The single "No 1/2 Steppin'" also became a top-ten R&B hit, while "The Way You Love Me" and "I'll Bet She's Got a Boyfriend" achieved moderate success on the charts. Due to the record label's struggle to market her because of her young age, Shanice was released from her recording contract with A&M Records.

=== 1990–1995: Breakthrough and Motown Records ===
In the summer of 1990, Shanice signed a record contract with Motown Records. Shanice's second album, Inner Child, was released internationally on November 19, 1991. The album became more successful than its predecessor, peaking at number eighty-three on the Billboard 200 and thirteen on the US Top R&B Albums chart. The album's lead single, "I Love Your Smile", reached number two on the US Billboard Hot 100 and also became a number-one hit in several other countries. The song earned a nomination for Best Female R&B Vocal Performance at the 35th Annual Grammy Awards (1993). Her follow-up single, "I'm Cryin'", peaked at number eleven on the US Hot R&B Singles. The album's third single, "Silent Prayer", which featured American singer Johnny Gill, peaked at number thirty-one on the Billboard Hot 100 and number four on the R&B chart. On May 26, 1992, Inner Child was received a gold certification by the Recording Industry Association of America (RIAA). In October 1992, she released a single titled "Saving Forever for You" on the soundtrack of American teen drama television series Beverly Hills, 90210. The song peaked at number four on the Billboard Hot 100. In July 1993, Shanice released a single titled "It's for You" on The Meteor Man soundtrack, which peaked at number fifty-five on Billboard Hot 100.

In June 1994, Shanice released her third album 21... Ways to Grow. While the album's first two singles "Somewhere" and "Turn Down the Lights" peaked within the top thirty on the US Hot R&B Singles chart, the album ultimately became a commercial failure and the album's final singles "I Like" and "I Wish" failed to make a significant impact on the charts. In 1995, she released a song titled "If I Never Knew You" on the Pocahontas soundtrack, and later released a cover version of "If I Were Your Woman" on the soundtrack of drama film Panther. Following the disappointment in 21... Ways to Grow's album sales and her release from Motown, Shanice went on a hiatus.

=== 1996–2002: Shanice and LaFace Records ===
In 1996, Shanice began performing background vocals for several singers. She contributed background vocals to Toni Braxton's "Come On Over Here" and "Un-Break My Heart" for her album Secrets (1996), as well as on "Bedtime" for Usher's My Way album in 1997. In January 1997, she made her theater debut as Eponine in the Broadway production of Les Misérables. In the summer of 1997, Shanice signed to Arista Records but later moved to LaFace Records at the request of label's co-owner LA Reid. In March 1999, Shanice released her self-titled fourth album on LaFace Records. The album's lead single, "When I Close My Eyes", set a then-record Billboard Hot 100 milestone when it moved from number 91 to number 16 on the chart, ultimately peaking at number 12. The album sales became sluggish after the release of the second single "Yesterday". In August 1999, Shanice toured as the opening act for NSYNC's Boys of Summer Tour.

In 2000, Shanice was dropped from her record deal with LaFace Records after she became pregnant with her first child. Following her appearance in the movie One Special Moment in June 2001, Shanice went on a music hiatus. She made a guest appearance in the American sitcom One on One's season one episode "Me & My Shadow".

=== 2005–2016: Every Woman Dreams and television ===
In 2005, Shanice re-emerged with the release of her single "Every Woman Dreams", which peaked at number 62 on the US R&B chart. In February 2006, she released her fifth album Every Woman Dreams on her own record label Imajah Records. Every Woman Dreams peaked at number thirty on the US Top R&B/Hip-Hop Albums chart. The album's singles "Take Care of U" and "So Sexy" experienced moderate success, peaking within the top seventy on the US Hot R&B/Hip-Hop Songs chart. In 2010, she performed vocals on the track "Behind the Mask" from Michael Jackson's posthumous album Michael. She recorded the song "A Midnight Rendezvous" for the 2012 Kinect game Rhythm Party. She also performed "Love Is the Gift", the English theme song for the video game The Bouncer.

In November 2014, the Oprah Winfrey Network began airing the reality television series Flex & Shanice. The show ran for three seasons and chronicled the daily events of Shanice and her husband as well as their family members. During the show, Shanice began recording new music and working with several producers. To coincide with the debut of Flex & Shanice, she released two singles: "Gotta Blame Me" and "We Can Fly" in November 2014. In July 2015, she released another single titled "Another Lonely Day in California". In 2016, she release a single titled "Breakdown".

=== 2019–present: Current projects ===
In 2019, Shanice returned with the single "He Won't". In 2022, she recorded the theme song for animated children's television series Mecha Builders. In September 2025, Shanice starred as former First Lady Michelle Obama in the Off-Broadway production of 44: The Obama Musical. In November 2025, Shanice announced that she will appear in the BET+ Christmas movie A Soulful Christmas.

== Artistry ==
=== Voice and musical style ===
Shanice possesses a five-octave soprano vocal range. Tim Griggs of AllMusic commented, "Shanice sure has an impressive voice, including the ability to sing falsetto." Music critic Jose F. Promis also of AllMusic stated, "Shanice has a strong voice and is a talented singer, but ultimately deserves more creative songwriting and better material, because one can't help but feel that her talent is wasted on this mindless, mass-produced '90s pop-soul borderline drudge." She is also known for ability sing and enunciate words in whistle register.

=== Influences ===
Shanice cited The Emotions as her greatest musical influence. Her mother Crystal Wilson also briefly replaced Sheila Hutchinson of The Emotions in 2022. She also cited Minnie Riperton's vocal style as an early influence. Shanice eventually recorded a cover version of Riperton's signature song "Lovin' You" for her own albums Inner Child (1991) and Every Woman Dreams (2006). Shanice has referred to MC Lyte as her favorite rapper, even influencing the rap verse on her song "I Love Your Smile". Other artists that Shanice has mentioned as inspirations include The Clark Sisters, Stevie Wonder, and Teena Marie.

== Business and ventures ==
=== Imajah Records ===
In 2005, Shanice established her independent record label Imajah Records, which serves an imprint for her music releases. The name is derived from her two children: Imani and Elijah. The record label collaborated with New York (state)-based label PlayTyme Music Entertainment to distribute Shanice's fifth album Every Woman Dreams in 2006. The label collaborated with Tree Leaf Records to distribute Shanice's later singles including "Another Lonely Day in California" and "Breakdown".

=== Smile by Shanice ===
In November 2018, Shanice launched her beauty line Smile by Shanice. The cosmetic line featured cruelty-free and vegan lipsticks and lip glosses.

== Personal life ==
On February 19, 2000, Shanice married actor and comedian Flex Alexander. They have two children, daughter Imani Knox (2001) and son Elijah Knox (2004).

In 2024, Shanice revealed her breast cancer diagnosis and underwent a double mastectomy.

== Discography ==
Studio albums

- Discovery (1987)
- Inner Child (1991)
- 21... Ways to Grow (1994)
- Shanice (1999)
- Every Woman Dreams (2006)

== Filmography ==
=== Film ===
Year	Title	Role
1995	Panther	Punk Panthers' Singer
2001	One Special Moment	Cynthia Wilkens
2022	To Her, with Love	Herself
2023	Kryptonite	Imani
2025	A Soulful Christmas	Patti Young

=== Television ===
Year	Title	Role	Notes
1984	Kids Incorporated	Herself	Season one
1993	Welcome Freshmen	Herself	Episode: "What Rhymes with Liar"
1994	Family Matters	Herself	Episode: "Rock Enroll"
1996	The Wizard of Oz on Ice	Singer	TV Special
2002	One on One	Chocolate Kisses' lead singer	Episode: "Me and My Shadow"
2020	Stuck with You	Travina	Recurring role
2021	First Wives Club	Herself	Episode: "End of the Road"
2024	The Cuzzin M Show	Zina	Episode: "Periodt"

== Theatre and musical ==
List of acting performances in theatre
Year	Title	Role	Notes	Source
1985	Get Happy	Performer	Supporting role; Westwood Playhouse production	
1997	Les Misérables	Eponine	Supporting role; Broadway	
2025	44: The Obama Musical	Michelle Obama	Lead role; Off-Broadway	

== Awards ==
=== Grammy Awards ===
The Grammy Awards (originally called the Gramophone Awards) — or Grammys – are presented annually by the National Academy of Recording Arts and Sciences of the United States for outstanding achievements in the music industry. The awards ceremony features performances by prominent artists, and some of the awards of more popular interest are presented in a widely viewed televised ceremony.

Year	Nominated work	Award	Result
1993	I Love Your Smile	Best Female R&B Vocal Performance	Nominated

=== Golden Lion Award ===
Year	Nominated work	Award	Result	Ref
1993	Shanice	Best International Artist	Won	

=== Soul Train Music Awards ===
The Soul Train Music Awards is an annual award show aired that honors the best in Black music and entertainment.

Year	Nominated work	Award	Result
1988	Shanice	Best New Artist	Nominated
