= List of songs written by Babyface =

This is an alphabetical list of the songs known to have been written or co-written by American musician Babyface.

Key
†	Indicates single release

Songs written by Babyface, with original artists, co-writers and originating album, showing year released.
Title	Artist(s)	Co-writer(s)	Originating album	Year	Ref.
"Ain't Got No Remedy"	Shanice	—N/a	Shanice	1999	
"Ain't Nothing Wrong" †	Houston	Harvey Mason, Jr.; Damon Thomas; Antonio Dixon; Eric Dawkins	It's Already Written	2004	
"All Day Thinkin'"	Babyface	—N/a	The Day	1996	
"All I've Ever Known"	The Deele	—N/a	Material Thangz	1985	
"All Night Long"	SWV	—N/a	Waiting to Exhale OST	1995	
"All Night Long"	Kat Graham	Kat Graham; Jean Yves "Jeeve" Ducornet	Love Music Funk Magic	2017	
"All The Things I Should Have Known"	K-Ci & JoJo	Erika Nuri	X	2000	
"Always In My Heart" †	Tevin Campbell	Daryl Simmons	I'm Ready	1993	
"And I Gave My Love to You"	Sonja Marie	Sonja Marie	Waiting to Exhale OST	1995	
"And I Love You"	Toni Braxton	—N/a	More Than a Woman	2002	
"And Our Feelings" †	Babyface	Daryl Simmons	For the Cool in You	1993	
"Another Sad Love Song" †	Toni Braxton	Daryl Simmons	Toni Braxton	1993	
"Anymore"	Whitney Houston	L.A. Reid	I'm Your Baby Tonight	1990	
"A Bit Old-Fashioned"	Babyface	—N/a	For the Cool in You	1993	
"A Girl Like You"	Kevon Edmonds (featuring Babyface)	—N/a	24/7	1999	
"Baby-Baby-Baby" †	TLC	L.A. Reid; Daryl Simmons	Ooooooohhh... On the TLC Tip	1992	
"Baby Come to Me"	Kevon Edmonds	Kevon Edmonds; J. Valentine; Robert Newt; Damon Thomas	24/7	1999	
"Baby I"	Tenderoni	—N/a	Soul Food OST	1997	
"Baby I" †	Ariana Grande	Antonio Dixon; Patrick "J. Que" Smith	Yours Truly	2013	
"Baby's Mama"	Babyface (featuring Snoop Dogg)	Calvin Broadus; Damon Thomas; Dorsey "Megahertz" Wesley; Andre Young; Leon Haywood; Billy Jackson; Eva Darby; Carlton Ridenhour; Hank Shocklee; Eric Sadler; David Ritz; Marvin Gaye; Odell Brown	Face2Face	2001	
"Backyard" †	Pebbles (featuring Salt-N-Pepa)	L.A. Reid; Cheryl James	Always	1990	
"Bedtime"	Usher	—N/a	My Way	1997	
"Best of Me" †	Chrisette Michele	Chrisette Payne	I Am	2007	
"The Best of Love"	Michael Bolton	Michael Bolton	All That Matters	1997	
"Best Thing I Never Had" †	Beyoncé	Antonio Dixon; Beyoncé Knowles; Patrick "J. Que" Smith; Shea Taylor; Larry Griffin, Jr.; Caleb McCampbell	4	2011	
"Betcha Never"	Vanessa Williams	—N/a	The Sweetest Days	1994	
"Be That Dude"	Jaheim	Balewa Muhammad; Toby Davis; Jaheim Hoagland; Perry L. Mapp, Jr.; Sheldon Ellerby; Darnell S. Bristol; Sid D. Johnson	Struggle Love	2016	
"Boys and Girls"	Tony! Toni! Toné!	Raphael Saadiq; Laney Stewart; Tricky Stewart	Soul Food OST	1997	
"Breathe Again" †	Toni Braxton	—N/a	Toni Braxton	1993	
"Broken-Hearted Girl" †	Beyoncé	Mikkel S. Eriksen; Tor Erik Hermansen; Beyoncé Knowles	I Am... Sasha Fierce	2008	
"Call da Police"	Kat Graham	Kat Graham; Jean Yves "Jeeve" Ducornet	Love Music Funk Magic	2017	
"Can I Stay With You"	Karyn White	—N/a	Make Him Do Right	1994	
"Can We Talk" †	Tevin Campbell	Daryl Simmons	I'm Ready	1993	
"Can't Get Enough"	Kat Graham	Kat Graham; Jean Yves "Jeeve" Ducornet	Love Music Funk Magic	2017	
"Can't Get You"	Jaehyun	Patrick "J.Que" Smith; Antonio Dixon; Jaehyun	J	2024	
"Can't Help Myself"	Destiny's Child	Daryl Simmons	B-Sides	1999	
"Can't Stop" †	After 7	L.A. Reid	After 7	1989	
"Can't Stop My Heart"	Babyface	L.A. Reid; Daryl Simmons	Tender Lover	1989	
"Can't Stop Now"	Babyface	Harvey Mason, Jr.; Damon Thomas	Grown & Sexy	2005	
"Care for Me"	Az Yet	—N/a	Az Yet	1996	
"Catching Feelings"	Justin Bieber	Justin Bieber; Patrick "J. Que" Smith; Antonio Dixon; Damon Thomas; Eric Dawkins	Believe	2012	
"Change Your Mind"	Fantasia Barrino	Fantasia Barrino; Harmony Samuels; Courtney Harrell; Antonio Reid	Side Effects of You	2013	
"Chivalry"	Babyface	Sid Johnson	Lovers	1986	
"Circumstantial Evidence" †	Shalamar	L.A. Reid	Circumstantial Evidence	1987	
"Count On Me" †	Whitney Houston and CeCe Winans	Whitney Houston; Michael Houston	Waiting to Exhale OST	1995	
"Crazy 'Bout 'Cha"	The Deele	L.A. Reid; Boaz Watson; Jeffrey Cooper; Carlos Greene	Street Beat	1983	
"Cried Me a River"	Kristinia DeBarge	Kristinia DeBarge; Ronnie Walton	Exposed	2009	
"Cruel Prelude"	Bobby Brown	L.A. Reid	Don't Be Cruel	1988	
"Cruel Reprise"	Bobby Brown	L.A. Reid	Don't Be Cruel	1988	
"Cryin' for It"	After 7	—N/a	Reflections	1995	
"The Color of Love" †	Boyz II Men	—N/a	Full Circle	2002	
"Comfortable"	Lil Wayne (featuring Babyface)	Dwayne Carter; Kanye West; Alicia Keys; Melvin Kent; Kenneth Williams; J. R. Bailey; Harold Lilly	Tha Carter III	2008	
"Could You Learn to Love" †	Tevin Campbell	—N/a	Back to the World	1996	
"The Day (That You Gave Me a Son)"	Babyface	—N/a	The Day	1996	
"Days Like This" †	Sheena Easton	Daryl Simmons; L.A. Reid	The Lover in Me	1988	
"The D Word"	Babyface and Toni Braxton	Toni Braxton	Love, Marriage & Divorce	2014	
"Dear Lie" †	TLC	Tionne Watkins	FanMail	1999	
"Dial My Heart" †	The Boys	L.A. Reid; Daryl Simmons	Messages from The Boys	1988	
"Diggin' on You" †	TLC	—N/a	CrazySexyCool	1994	
"Doesn't Everybody Want to Fall in Love"	Kristinia DeBarge	Daryl Simmons; Ronnie Walton	Exposed	2009	
"Do It" †	Toni Braxton	Toni Braxton; Antonio Dixon; Percy Bady	Spell My Name	2020	
"Don't Be Cruel" †	Bobby Brown	L.A. Reid; Daryl Simmons	Don't Be Cruel	1988	
"Don't Keep Me Waiting" †	The Whispers	—N/a	So Good	1984	
"Don't Mess with Me"	Karyn White	L.A. Reid; Daryl Simmons	Karyn White	1988	
"Don't Remind Me"	Damian Dame	L.A. Reid; Daryl Simmons	Damian Dame	1991	
"Don't Take It So Personal"	Babyface	Brion James; Anthony Nance	Face2Face	2001	
"Don't Wanna Love You"	Shanice	L.A. Reid; Daryl Simmons	Boomerang OST	1992	
"Don't Wear It Out"	Mary Davis	L.A. Reid; Darnell Bristol	Separate Ways	1990	
"Don't You Deserve Someone"	Jermaine Jackson	Daryl Simmons; Jermaine Jackson; L.A. Reid	You Said	1991	
"Drama, Love & 'Lationships"	Babyface	—N/a	Grown & Sexy	2005	
"Dreamin'"	Shanice	—N/a	Shanice	1999	
"Dreaming"	Beyoncé	Antonio Dixon; Beyoncé Knowles; Patrick "J. Que" Smith	4	2011	
"Dry Your Eyes"	The Deele	Daryl Simmons; Darnell Bristol	Can-U-Dance B-Side	1987	
"End of the Road" †	Boyz II Men	L.A. Reid; Daryl Simmons	Boomerang OST	1992	
"Every Day is Christmas" †	The Braxtons	Antonio Dixon; Leon Thomas III; Khristopher Riddick-Tynes	Braxton Family Christmas	2015	
"Every Little Bit of My Heart"	Az Yet	Keith Andes; Bryce Wilson; Marc Nelson	Az Yet	1996	
"Every Little Step" †	Bobby Brown	L.A. Reid	Don't Be Cruel	1988	
"Every Time I Close My Eyes" †	Babyface (featuring Mariah Carey and Kenny G)	—N/a	The Day	1996	
"Everywhere I Go"	Katharine McPhee	Ernest "Bishop Young Don" Dixon	Katharine McPhee	2007	
"Exceptional" †	Babyface	Daryl Simmons; Kameron Glasper	Return of the Tender Lover	2015	
"Exclusivity" †	Damian Dame	L.A. Reid; Bruce Broadus	Damian Dame	1991	
"Exhale (Shoop Shoop)" †	Whitney Houston	—N/a	Waiting to Exhale OST	1996	
"Fairweather Friend" †	Johnny Gill	L.A. Reid; Daryl Simmons	Johnny Gill	1990	
"Fairy Tale"	Toni Braxton	Marc Harris; Tommy Sims	The Heat	2000	
"Faithful"	Babyface	Sid Johnson	Lovers	1986	
"Fall for You"	Shanice	—N/a	Shanice	1999	
"Family Man"	Karyn White	L.A. Reid; Daryl Simmons	Karyn White	1988	
"Feels So Much Better"	Johnny Gill	—N/a	Johnny Gill	1990	
"Fight for Love"	Babyface	Daryl Simmons	Return of the Tender Lover	2015	
"Find Me a Man"	Toni Braxton	—N/a	Secrets	1996	
"Fly Away"	Shanice	Laney Stewart; Philip "Silky" White; Gloria Stewart	Shanice	1999	
"FOH"	Toni Braxton	Toni Braxton; Dapo Torimiro; Kameron Glasper; Daryl Simmons	Sex & Cigarettes	2018	
"Follow My Rainbow" †	Sheena Easton	—N/a	The Lover in Me	1988	
"For the Cool in You" †	Babyface	Daryl Simmons	For the Cool in You	1993	
"Fool for Ya"	Kat Graham	Kat Graham; Jean Yves "Jeeve" Ducornet	Love Music Funk Magic	2017	
"Forbidden Love"	Madonna	Madonna	Bedtime Stories	1994	
"Game Changer"	Johnny Gill	Antonio Dixon; Brandon Coleman; Patrick "J. Que" Smith	Game Changer	2014	
"The Gettin' to Know U"	Babyface	—N/a	Grown & Sexy	2005	
"Gimme Some"	Toni Braxton (featuring Lisa "Left Eye" Lopes)	Phalon Alexander; Toni Braxton; Lisa "Left Eye" Lopes	The Heat	2000	
"Girlfriend" †	Pebbles	L.A. Reid	Pebbles	1987	
"Girl in the Life Magazine"	Boyz II Men	—N/a	Evolution	1997	
"Giving You the Benefit" †	Pebbles	L.A. Reid	Always	1990	
"Give It to Me"	Pebbles	L.A. Reid	Always	1990	
"Give U My Heart" †	Babyface and Toni Braxton	L.A. Reid; Daryl Simmons; Boaz Watson	Boomerang OST	1992	
"Given a Chance"	Babyface	—N/a	Tender Lover	1989	
"God Must Love U"	Babyface	—N/a	Grown & Sexy	2005	
"Goin' Outta Business"	Babyface	Daryl Simmons	Grown & Sexy	2005	
"Good Enough" †	Bobby Brown	L.A. Reid; Daryl Simmons	Bobby	1992	
"Good Thang"	Pebbles	L.A. Reid; Daryl Simmons; Kevin Roberson; Perri "Pebbles" Reid	Always	1990	
"Good to Be in Love"	Babyface	Gregg Pagani; Clarence Allen; Daryl Simmons	Grown & Sexy	2005	
"Gotta Learn My Rhythm" †	Damian Dame	L.A. Reid; Daryl Simmons	Damian Dame	1991	
"Grown & Sexy"	Babyface	Daryl Simmons	Grown & Sexy	2005	
"Grown Thangs"	Luther Vandross	Jonathan Buck; Luther Vandross	Luther Vandross	2001	
"Hands Up" †	TLC	Daryl Simmons	3D	2002	
"Have I Never" †	A Few Good Men	—N/a	A Thang for You	1994	
"He Don't Know Nothin' Bout It"	Jimmy Jam and Terry Lewis (with Babyface)	James Harris III; Terry Lewis	Jam & Lewis: Volume One	2020	
"Heart Attack"	Babyface and Toni Braxton	Toni Braxton; Daryl Simmons	Love, Marriage & Divorce	2014	
"Heat of the Moment" †	After 7	L.A. Reid	After 7	1989	
"Here Comes the Pain Again"	Karyn White	—N/a	Make Him Do Right	1994	
"Ho of My Own"	Highland Place Mobsters	L.A. Reid; Daryl Simmons; Gene Redd; Jimmy Crosby	1746DCGA30035	1992	
"Honey" †	Aretha Franklin	—N/a	Greatest Hits: 1980–1994	1994	
"Honeymoon Avenue"	Ariana Grande	Antonio Dixon; Dennis "Aganee" Jenkins; Khristopher Riddick-Tynes; Leon Thomas III; Ariana Grande; Maurice Wade; Roahn Hylton; Thomas Lee Brown; Travis Sayles; Victoria McCants	Yours Truly	2013	
"Hovi Baby" †	Jay-Z	Shawn Carter; Justin Smith	The Blueprint 2: The Gift & The Curse	2002	
"How Can I Not Love You" †	Joy Enriquez	George Fenton; Robert Kraft	Anna and the King OST	1999	
"How Can U Be Down"	Babyface	—N/a	Face2Face	2001	
"How Come, How Long" †	Babyface and Stevie Wonder	Stevie Wonder	The Day	1996	
"How Could an Angel Break My Heart" †	Toni Braxton (featuring Kenny G)	Toni Braxton	Secrets	1996	
"How Could You Call Her Baby"	Shanna	—N/a	Waiting to Exhale OST	1995	
"How Do You Tell the One"	After 7	—N/a	Reflections	1995	
"How Many Times (Will You Let Him Break Your Heart)"	K-Ci & JoJo	Jorge Corante; Emanuel Officer	Love Always	1997	
"How Often"	Kevon Edmonds	Walter Afanasieff; Robin Thicke	24/7	1999	
"Humpin' Around" †	Bobby Brown	L.A. Reid; Daryl Simmons; Bobby Brown; Thomas Keyes; Jan C. "Stylz" Styles; Jimmy Page; Robert Plant; James Brown; The J.B.'s	Bobby	1992	
"Hurt You" †	Babyface and Toni Braxton	Toni Braxton; Daryl Simmons; Antonio Dixon	Love, Marriage & Divorce	2014	
"I Care 'Bout You"	Milestone	—N/a	Soul Food OST	1997	
"I Don't Want to Be Lonely"	Az Yet	—N/a	Az Yet	1996	
"I Don't Want to Know" †	Gladys Knight	—N/a	Just for You	1994	
"I Dream, I Dream" †	Jermaine Jackson	Daryl Simmons; L.A. Reid	You Said	1991	
"I Hate You"	Toni Braxton	Harvey Mason, Jr.; Damon Thomas; Antonio Dixon; Eric Dawkins	Libra	2005	
"I Hope That You're Okay"	Babyface	Daryl Simmons	Love, Marriage & Divorce	2014	
"I Keep Callin'"	Babyface	Dwight Myers; Brion James; Anthony Nance	Face2Face	2001	
"I Love You Babe" †	Babyface	—N/a	Lovers	1986	
"I Miss You So Much"	TLC	Daryl Simmons	FanMail	1999	
"I Said I Love You"	Babyface	—N/a	The Day	1996	
"I Still Love You"	Next	Arkeida Clowers; Darnell Bristoll; D. Lighty; Raphael Brown; Robert L. Huggar; Sid Johnson; Tony Tolbert	Rated Next	1997	
"I Wanna Be (Your Baby)"	Toni Braxton	Harvey Mason, Jr.; Damon Thomas; Daryl Simmons	Libra	2005	
"I Want You"	Babyface (featuring After 7)	Daryl Simmons	Return of the Tender Lover	2015	
"I Want You (to Be My Playthang)"	Shalamar	L.A. Reid; Sid Johnson; Stephen Page	Circumstantial Evidence	1987	
"I'd Still Say Yes" †	Klymaxx / The Braxtons	Joyce "Fenderella" Irby; Gregory Scelsa	Klymaxx / So Many Ways	1986 / 1996	
"I'd Rather Be Broke"	Toni Braxton	Daryl Simmons; Antonio Dixon; Khristopher Riddick-Tynes; Leon Thomas; Kameron Glasper	Love, Marriage & Divorce	2014	
"If I"	After 7	Daryl Simmons	Timeless	2016	
"If I Want To"	Usher	Jermaine Dupri; Bryan-Michael Cox; Usher Raymond IV; Christopher Wallace; Osten Harvey, Jr.; Roger Troutman	8701	2001	
"If Only in Heaven's Eyes"	NSYNC	—N/a	Light It Up OST	1999	
"If We Try"	Babyface	Lynelle Edmonds; Tony Coates	Lovers	1986	
"I'll Always Love You"	Babyface	L.A. Reid; Daryl Simmons	For the Cool in You	1993	
"I'll Make Love to You" †	Boyz II Men	—N/a	II	1994	
"I'll Send You Roses"	The Deele	Connie Oates	Material Thangz	1985	
"Illusions"	Babyface	—N/a	For the Cool in You	1993	
"It's Gotta Be Love"	Kristinia DeBarge	Kristinia DeBarge; Steve Ettinger; Darryl Pierce; Dwayne Simon; James Todd Smith; Bobby Ervin	Exposed	2009	
"It's No Crime" †	Babyface	L.A. Reid; Daryl Simmons	Tender Lover	1989	
"I'm Ready" †	Tevin Campbell	—N/a	I'm Ready	1993	
"I'm Your Baby Tonight" †	Whitney Houston	L.A. Reid	I'm Your Baby Tonight	1990	
"In the Late of Night"	Toni Braxton	Jonathan Buck	Secrets	1996	
"In the Mood"	The Whispers	Daryl Simmons	Just Gets Better With Time	1987	
"It Hurts Like Hell"	Aretha Franklin	—N/a	Waiting to Exhale OST	1995	
"It Will Break My Heart" †	Ken Hirai	Ken Hirai	Life Is...	2002	
"Jam"	Kevin Gates (featuring Trey Songz, Ty Dolla $ign and Jamie Foxx)	Kevin Gilyard; Tremaine Neverson; Tyrone Griffin, Jr.; Jamie Foxx; Micah Powell; Belinda Lipscomb; Boaz Watson; Sid Johnson	Islah	2016	
"Jealous" †	The Mac Band featuring The McCampbell Brothers	L.A. Reid; Darnell Bristol; Kevin Roberson; Charles McCampbell	The Mac Band featuring The McCampbell Brothers	1988	
"Just Hold On"	Boyz II Men	—N/a	Evolution	1997	
"Just Like That"	Colbie Caillat	Colbie Caillat; Daryl Simmons	Gypsy Heart	2014	
"Just My Luck" †	The Deele / Alyson Williams	—N/a	Street Beat / Alyson Williams	1983 / 1991	
"Just Stand Up!" †	Various Artists	Ronnie Walton	Just Stand Up! (Single)	2008	
"Keep it Right There"	Diana Ross	Jon-John Robinson; Chris Liscomb	Take Me Higher	1995	
"Kissing You"	Faith Evans	—N/a	Waiting to Exhale OST	1995	
"Knocked Out" †	Paula Abdul	L.A. Reid; Daryl Simmons	Forever Your Girl	1988	
"Koolaid Man"	Kat Graham	Kat Graham; Jean Yves "Jeeve" Ducornet	Love Music Funk Magic	2017	
"Lady, Lady"	Babyface	—N/a	For the Cool in You	1993	
"Land Called Far Away"	Colbie Caillat	Colbie Caillat	Gypsy Heart	2014	
"Last Night" †	Az Yet	Keith Andes	Az Yet	1996	
"Let's Do It Again"	TLC	Jon-John Robinson	CrazySexyCool	1994	
"Let's Get the Mood Right" †	Johnny Gill	—N/a	Let's Get the Mood Right	1996	
"Let's Be Romantic"	Babyface	Daryl Simmons	Tender Lover	1989	
"Let's Work Tonight"	The Deele	—N/a	Material Thangz	1985	
"Let It Flow" †	Toni Braxton	—N/a	Waiting to Exhale OST	1995	
"Let Me Know"	After 7	Antonio Dixon; Demonté Posey; Daryl Simmons	Timeless	2016	
"Let No One Separate Us"	The Deele	L.A. Reid; Darnell Bristol	Eyes of a Stranger	1987	
"Let's Do It"	Babyface and Toni Braxton	Toni Braxton	Love, Marriage & Divorce	2014	
"Like Bobby"	Bobby Brown	Teddy Riley; Antonio Dixon; Khristopher Riddick-Tynes; Bobby Brown; Leon Thomas; Jason "J-Hot" Scott; The Roots	TBA	2018	
"A Little Romance" †	The Boys	Sid Johnson; Charles Muldrow, Jr.; Bruce Robinson	Messages from The Boys	1988	
"Like You Used to Do"	Anita Baker	Anita Baker; Barry J. Eastmond	My Everything	2004	
"The Loneliness" †	Babyface	—N/a	Grown & Sexy	2005	
"Long Way from Home" †	Johnny Gill	L.A. Reid; Daryl Simmons	Provocative	1993	
"Losin' the Love"	Joy Enriquez	Marc Nelson	Joy Enriquez	2001	
"Love and Devotion"	Babyface	Daryl Simmons	Return of the Tender Lover	2015	
"Love's Been So Nice"	After 7	Donald Parks	After 7	1989	
"Love By Day, Love By Night"	After 7	Daryl Simmons; Kevin Roberson	Takin' My Time	1992	
"Love Is Everything" †	Ariana Grande	Ariana Grande; Khristopher Riddick-Tynes; Leon Thomas III; Antonio Dixon	Christmas Kisses	2013	
"Love Hurts"	Jon B.	—N/a	Cool Relax	1997	
"Love Hurts"	Ralph Tresvant	Daryl Simmons; Kevin Roberson	Ralph Tresvant	1990	
"Love Makes Things Happen" †	Pebbles	L.A. Reid	Always	1990	
"Love Shoulda Brought You Home" †	Toni Braxton	Daryl Simmons; Boaz Watson	Boomerang OST	1992	
"Love Will Be Waiting at Home"	For Real	—N/a	Waiting to Exhale OST	1995	
"Love Will Be Waiting at Home"	Kevon Edmonds	Marc Harris; Tommy Sims	24/7	1999	
"Love Saw It" †	Karyn White (featuring Babyface)	L.A. Reid; Daryl Simmons	Karyn White	1988	
"Love That Man" †	Whitney Houston	Rob Fusari; Calvin Gaines; Eritza Laues; Bill Lee; Balewa Muhammad	Just Whitney...	2002	
"Lover and Friend"	Babyface	Anthony "Buckwild" Best; Jason Edmonds	Face2Face	2001	
"The Lover in Me" †	Sheena Easton	Daryl Simmons; L.A. Reid	The Lover in Me	1988	
"Lover"	Kat Graham	Kat Graham; Jean Yves "Jeeve" Ducornet	Love Music Funk Magic	2017	
"Lovers"	Babyface	L.A. Reid; Darnell Bristol; Kevin Roberson	Lovers	1986	
"A Lovers Holiday"	Jermaine Jackson	Daryl Simmons; Jermaine Jackson; L.A. Reid	You Said	1991	
"Lovin' It"	Ariana Grande	Khristopher Riddick-Tynes; Leon Thomas III; Ricky "SlikkMuzik" Offord; Antonio Dixon; Mark Morales; Kirk S. Robinson; Nathaniel V Robinson; Mark C. Rooney; Roy C. Hammond	Yours Truly	2013	
"Loving You All My Life"	After 7	Daryl Simmons	Timeless	2016	
"Lucky Charm" †	The Boys	Daryl Simmons; Gregory Scelsa	Messages from The Boys	1988	
"Mad"	Anthony Hamilton	Antonio Dixon; Patrick "J. Que" Smith; Anthony Hamilton	Back to Love	2011	
"Mad, Sexy, Cool"	Babyface	Minnie Riperton; Richard Rudolph	Grown & Sexy	2005	
"Magic"	Kat Graham	Kat Graham; Jean Yves "Jeeve" Ducornet	Love Music Funk Magic	2017	
"Make It Last"	Tyrese Gibson (featuring Jewel)	Antonio Dixon; Daryl Simmons; Damon Thomas	Hidden Track from Transformers: Revenge of the Fallen	2009	
"Mary Mack" †	Babyface	Darnell Bristol; Kevin Roberson	Lovers	1986	
"Melt Away"	Mariah Carey	Mariah Carey	Daydream	1995	
"Missing You" †	Mary J. Blige	—N/a	Share My World	1997	
"Miracle" †	Whitney Houston	L.A. Reid	I'm Your Baby Tonight	1990	
"More Than Friends"	After 7	Antonio Dixon; Patrick "J. Que" Smith; Daryl Simmons	Timeless	2016	
"Most Girls" †	P!nk	Damon Thomas	Can't Take Me Home	2000	
"Mother"	Ashanti	Ashanti Douglas	The Declaration	2008	
"My First Night with You" †	Deborah Cox / Mýa	Diane Warren	Deborah Cox / Mýa	1995 / 1998	
"My Heart"	Toni Braxton (featuring Colbie Caillat)	Toni Braxton; Dapo Torimiro; Kameron Glasper; Colbie Caillat	Sex & Cigarettes	2018	
"My Heart Is Calling" †	Whitney Houston	—N/a	The Preacher's Wife OST	1996	
"My Kinda Girl" †	Babyface	L.A. Reid; Daryl Simmons	Tender Lover	1989	
"My Love, Sweet Love"	Patti LaBelle	—N/a	Waiting to Exhale OST	1995	
"My, My, My" †	Johnny Gill	Daryl Simmons	Johnny Gill	1990	
"Namae Oshiete"	King & Prince	N/A	Re:Sense	2021	
"Never"	Boyz II Men	Michael McCary; Nathan Morris; Shawn Stockman; Wanya Morris	Evolution	1997	
"Never Forget You" †	Mariah Carey	Mariah Carey	Music Box	1993	
"Never Gonna Let You Down"	Colbie Caillat	Brett James; Colbie Caillat; Jason Reeves	Gypsy Heart	2014	
"Never Gonna Let You Go" †	Faith Evans	Damon Thomas	Keep the Faith	1998	
"Never Keeping Secrets" †	Babyface	—N/a	For the Cool in You	1993	
"Never Know Love"	Johnny Gill	L.A. Reid	Johnny Gill	1990	
"Never Love A Stranger"	Madonna (featuring Babyface)		TBA	1997	
"Never Love You"	Kevon Edmonds	—N/a	24/7	1999	
"No Deposit, No Return"	Sheena Easton	Daryl Simmons; L.A. Reid; Kevin Roberson	The Lover in Me	1988	
"No Place Like Home"	Kenny G (featuring Babyface)	—N/a	Heart and Soul	2010	
"Not Gon' Cry" †	Mary J. Blige	—N/a	Waiting to Exhale OST	1995	
"Nothin'"	Toni Braxton	Dapo Torimiro; Kam Parker; Kameron Glasper	Spell My Name	2020	
"Nothin' (That Compares 2 U)" †	The Jacksons	L.A. Reid	2300 Jackson Street	1989	
"On Our Own" †	Bobby Brown	L.A. Reid; Daryl Simmons	Ghostbusters II OST	1989	
"One"	Babyface and Toni Braxton	Daryl Simmons	Love, Marriage & Divorce	2014	
"One Night"	After 7	L.A. Reid	After 7	1989	
"One Love"	Sheena Easton	L.A. Reid	The Lover in Me	1988	
"Our Love"	Babyface	Daryl Simmons	Return of the Tender Lover	2015	
"Outside In/Inside Out"	Babyface	Michael "Mike City" Flowers	Face2Face	2001	
"The Power of the Dream" †	Celine Dion	David Foster; Linda Thompson	Falling into You	1996	
"Pray for Me"	Anthony Hamilton	Antonio Dixon; Patrick "J. Que" Smith; Anthony Hamilton	Back to Love	2011	
"Pretty Girl" †	Jon B.	—N/a	Bonafide	1995	
"Pretty Little Girl"	Bobby Brown	L.A. Reid; Daryl Simmons	Bobby	1992	
"Pride & Joy"	Jon B.	—N/a	Cool Relax	1997	
"Queen of the Night" †	Whitney Houston	L.A. Reid; Daryl Simmons; Whitney Houston	The Bodyguard OST	1992	
"Ready or Not" †	After 7	L.A. Reid	After 7	1989	
"Rebel (With a Cause)"	Jermaine Jackson	Daryl Simmons; Jermaine Jackson; Kevin Roberson; L.A. Reid	You Said	1991	
"Red Light Special" †	TLC	—N/a	CrazySexyCool	1994	
"Refuse to be Loose" †	Siedah Garrett	L.A. Reid	Kiss of Life	1988	
"Reunited"	Babyface and Toni Braxton	Toni Braxton; Daryl Simmons; Antonio Dixon	Love, Marriage & Divorce	2014	
"Reversal of a Dog"	The LaFace Cartel (featuring Damian Dame, Highland Place Mobsters, TLC and Toni Braxton)	L.A. Reid; Daryl Simmons; Melvin Davis; Lisa Lopes; George Clinton; Garry Shider; David Spradley	Boomerang OST	1992	
"Right Down to It" †	Damian Dame	L.A. Reid; Daryl Simmons	Damian Dame	1991	
"Rock Bottom"	Babyface	L.A. Reid; Daryl Simmons	For the Cool in You	1993	
"Rock Steady" †	The Whispers	L.A. Reid; Dwayne Ladd; Boaz Watson	Just Gets Better With Time	1987	
"Rock Wit'cha" †	Bobby Brown	Darnell Bristol	Dance!...Ya Know It!	1989	
"Roller Coaster"	Babyface and Toni Braxton	Daryl Simmons; Antonio Dixon	Love, Marriage & Divorce	2014	
"Roni" †	Bobby Brown	Darnell Bristol	Don't Be Cruel	1988	
"Roses Are Red" †	The Mac Band featuring The McCampbell Brothers	L.A. Reid	The Mac Band featuring The McCampbell Brothers	1988	
"Running Out"	After 7	Daryl Simmons	Timeless	2016	
"Sadder than Blue"	Az Yet	"Bassy" Bob Brockmann; Jeffrey Burrell	Az Yet	1996	
"Saturday"	Babyface	L.A. Reid; Daryl Simmons	For the Cool in You	1993	
"Saved for Someone Else"	Az Yet	Keith Andes	Az Yet	1996	
"Say a Prayer for Me"	Pebbles	L.A. Reid	Always	1990	
"Say What's in My Heart"	Aaron Neville	Diane Warren	...To Make Me Who I Am	1997	
"Sayonara"	After 7	L.A. Reid	After 7	1989	
"Scar"	Foxes	Louisa Allen; Antonio Dixon; Khristopher Riddick-Tynes; Janée Bennett; J.P. Saxe	All I Need	2016	
"Secret Rendezvous" †	Karyn White	L.A. Reid; Daryl Simmons	Karyn White	1988	
"Secrets"	Jermaine Jackson	Daryl Simmons; Jermaine Jackson; L.A. Reid	You Said	1991	
"Secrets"	Kat Graham (featuring Kenny "Babyface" Edmonds	Kat Graham; Jean Yves "Jeeve" Ducornet	Roxbury Drive	2015	
"Seven Seas"	Babyface	Marc Nelson	The Day	1996	
"Seven Whole Days" †	Toni Braxton	L.A. Reid	Toni Braxton	1993	
"Sexy Love"	The Deele	L.A. Reid; Stanley Burke	Street Beat	1983	
"Shake That" †	Samantha Jade (featuring Pitbull)	Antonio Dixon; Khristopher Riddick-Tynes; Leon Thomas III; Carmen Reece; JP Saxe; Armando Pérez	Nine	2015	
"Shock Dat Monkey"	TLC	L.A. Reid; Daryl Simmons; Lisa Lopes; Kenneth Gamble; Leon Huff; Peter Gabriel; James Brown; Morris Dickerson; Charles Miller; Sylvester Allen; Harold Ray Brown; Howard Scott; Lee Oskar; Leroy Jordan; Gene Redd; Jimmy Crosby	Ooooooohhh... On the TLC Tip	1992	
"She"	Babyface	—N/a	Grown & Sexy	2005	
"She's International"	Babyface	Clarence Allen; Gregg Pagani; Daryl Simmons	Grown & Sexy	2005	
"Simple Days"	Babyface	Robbie Nevil; Emanuel Officer; Bradley Spalter	The Day	1996	
"Situation"	Joy Enriquez	—N/a	Joy Enriquez	2001	
"Sittin' Up in My Room" †	Brandy	Sylvester Stewart	Waiting to Exhale OST	1995	
"Slave to the Rhythm (Original Version)" †	Michael Jackson	L.A. Reid; Daryl Simmons; Kevin Roberson	Dangerous Leftover Track / Xscape	1991 / 2014	
"Slow Jam"	Midnight Star / Usher and Monica	Boaz Watson; Belinda Lipscomb; Sid Johnson	No Parking on the Dance Floor / Soul Food OST	1983 / 1997	
"Smile"	Tamia	—N/a	More	2004	
"Snooze" †	SZA	Solána Rowe; Khris Riddick-Tynes; Leon Thomas; Blair Ferguson	SOS	2022	
"Snow in California" †	Ariana Grande	Ariana Grande; Khristopher Riddick-Tynes; Leon Thomas III; Antonio Dixon	Christmas Kisses	2013	
"Soft Music"	Tease	—N/a	Tease	1986	
"Solid"	Ty Dolla $ign (featuring Babyface)	Tyrone Griffin, Jr.; Khristopher Riddick-Tynes; Glenda Proby	Free TC	2015	
"So Many Thangz"	The Deele	Daryl Simmons; Darnell Bristol	Eyes of a Stranger	1987	
"Someday"	Joy Enriquez	—N/a	Joy Enriquez	2001	
"Some Kinda Lover" †	The Whispers	Boaz Watson	So Good	1984	
"Someone to Love" †	Jon B. (featuring Babyface)	—N/a	Bad Boys OST / Bonafide	1995	
"Somethin' You Wanna Know"	TLC	Daryl Simmons; Kevin Roberson; L.A. Reid; Lisa Lopes	Ooooooohhh... On the TLC Tip	1992	
"Something 'Bout You"	Babyface	Daryl Simmons; Kameron Glasper	Return of the Tender Lover	2015	
"Something New" †	Zendaya (featuring Chris Brown)	Antonio Dixon; Christopher “Chrishan” Dotson; Khristopher Riddick-Tynes; Leon Thomas III; Kyle Coleman; Zendaya Coleman; Dallas Austin; Ricky Walters	TBA	2016	
"Something In Your Eyes" †	Bell Biv DeVoe	Boaz Watson	Hootie Mack	1993	
"Sometimes Love"	Patti LaBelle	—N/a	Timeless Journey	2004	
"Soon As I Get Home"	Babyface	—N/a	Tender Lover	1989	
"Sometimes"	Kat Graham	Kat Graham; Jean Yves "Jeeve" Ducornet	Love Music Funk Magic	2017	
"So Sexual"	Sisqó	Mark "Sisqó" Andrews; Nathan "N8" Walton; Kiehl Owens; Tavia Ivey	Unleash the Dragon	1999	
"A Song for Mama" †	Boyz II Men	—N/a	Soul Food OST	1997	
"Sorry for the Stupid Things"	Babyface	Daryl Simmons	Grown & Sexy	2005	
"Southern Girl"	A Few Good Men	Daryl Simmons; Dave Simmons, Jr.; Ronald White; William "Smokey" Robinson	A Thang for You	1994	
"Split Personality"	P!nk	Alecia Moore; Terence "Tramp-baby" Abney	Can't Take Me Home	2000	
"Standing Ovation"	Babyface	Daryl Simmons	Return of the Tender Lover	2015	
"Still in Love With U"	Babyface	Jason Edmonds	Face2Face	2001	
"Stimulate"	The Deele	L.A. Reid; Darnell Bristol; Kevin Roberson	Material Thangz	1985	
"Stressed Out"	Babyface	Pharrell Williams; Chad Hugo	Face2Face	2001	
"Stronger Together"	Jessica Sanchez	Carole Bayer Sager; Bruce Roberts	Non-album single	2016	
"Stuck" †	The Mac Band featuring The McCampbell Brothers	L.A. Reid; Stanley Burke; Charles McCampbell	The Mac Band featuring The McCampbell Brothers	1988	
"Sunshine"	Babyface	—N/a	Tender Lover	1989	
"Superwoman" †	Karyn White	L.A. Reid; Daryl Simmons	Karyn White	1988	
"Suspicious"	The Deele	L.A. Reid; Daryl Simmons; Carlos Greene; Kevin Roberson	Material Thangz	1985	
"Sweat"	Babyface and Toni Braxton	Daryl Simmons; Antonio Dixon	Love, Marriage & Divorce	2014	
"Sweet November" †	The Deele / Troop	—N/a	Material Thangz / Deepa	1985 / 1992	
"Swing It"	Diana Ross	Jon-John Robinson; Chris Liscomb	Take Me Higher	1995	
"Take a Bow" †	Madonna	Madonna	Bedtime Stories	1994	
"Take It Back"	Babyface and Toni Braxton	Toni Braxton; Daryl Simmons; Antonio Dixon	Love, Marriage & Divorce	2014	
"Take Your Time"	Babyface	Daryl Simmons; L.A. Reid	Lovers	1986	
"Talk to Me" †	Babyface (featuring Eric Clapton)	—N/a	The Day	1996	
"Tattooed Heart"	Ariana Grande	Ariana Grande; Khristopher Riddick-Tynes; Leon Thomas III; Antonio Dixon; Matt Squire; Sean Foreman	Yours Truly	2013	
"Tears" †	The Isley Brothers	—N/a	Mission to Please	1996	
"Tell Me How U Want It"	Johnny Gill	Daryl Simmons	Provocative	1993	
"Tell Me No"	Whitney Houston	Kandi Burruss; Holly Lamar; Annie Roboff	Just Whitney...	2002	
"Tell Me Where" †	Tevin Campbell	Anthony "A-Tone" Bryant; Langston "Chuck Boom" Bryant	Back to the World	1996	
"Tender Lover" †	Babyface	L.A. Reid; Perri "Pebbles" Reid	Tender Lover	1989	
"Thankful"	Kelly Clarkson	Kelly Clarkson; Harvey Mason, Jr.; Damon Thomas	Thankful	2003	
"That Somebody Was You"	Kenny G (featuring Toni Braxton)	Kenny G; Walter Afanasieff	The Moment	1996	
"That's All I Want" †	Az Yet	Keith Andes	Az Yet	1996	
"That's When I Knew"	Alicia Keys	Alicia Keys; Antonio Dixon	Girl on Fire	2012	
"There for Me (Baby)"	Tyrese Gibson	Damon Thomas	2000 Watts	2001	
"There Goes My Baby" †	Charlie Wilson	Gregg Pagani; Calvin Richardson; Clarence Allen; Daryl Simmons; Kenneth Copeland; Marvin "Smitty" Smith	Uncle Charlie	2009	
"There Goes That Feeling Again" †	Usher	Usher Raymond	All About U	2000	
"There She Goes" †	Babyface	Pharrell Williams; Chad Hugo	Face2Face	2001	
"There U Go"	Johnny Gill	L.A. Reid; Daryl Simmons	Boomerang OST	1992	
"There's No Me Without You"	Toni Braxton	—N/a	Secrets	1996	
"These Are the Times" †	Dru Hill	Damon Thomas	Enter the Dru	1998	
"They Don't Give"	Jordin Sparks	Jordin Sparks; Salaam Remi	Right Here, Right Now	2015	
"Thinkin' 'Bout My Ex"	Janet Jackson	Tanya White; Andy Cramer	Damita Jo	2004	
"This Christmas Day"	Jessie J	Jessica Cornish	This Christmas Day	2018	
"This Is How It Works"	TLC	Lisa Lopes	Waiting to Exhale OST	1995	
"This Time Next Year"	Toni Braxton	David Foster; Toni Braxton	Snowflakes	2001	
"Time=$"	Kat Graham	Kat Graham; Jean Yves "Jeeve" Ducornet	Love Music Funk Magic	2017	
"Tonight Is Right"	Keith Washington	L.A. Reid; Daryl Simmons	Boomerang OST	1992	
"Tonight It's Goin' Down"	Babyface	Daryl Simmons	Grown & Sexy	2005	
"Too Good to Say Goodbye"	Bruno Mars	Bruno Mars; Philip Lawrence; Cristopher Brody Brown; Jeff Bhasker	24K Magic	2016	
"Til You Do Me Right" †	After 7	Kevon Edmonds; Melvin Edmonds	Reflections	1995	
"Treat You Right"	Jermaine Jackson (featuring Babyface)	Daryl Simmons; L.A. Reid	You Said	1991	
"True Lovers"	Jermaine Jackson	Daryl Simmons; L.A. Reid	You Said	1991	
"Truly Something Special"	After 7	Boaz Watson	Takin' My Time	1992	
"Trumpet Man"	Damian Dame	L.A. Reid; Daryl Simmons; Bruce Broadus; Debra Hurd	Damian Dame	1991	
"Try" †	Colbie Caillat	Antonio Dixon; Colbie Caillat; Jason Reeves	Gypsy Heart	2014	
"Try It on My Own" †	Whitney Houston	Jason Edmonds; Carole Bayer Sager; Aleese Simmons; Nathan Walton	Just Whitney...	2002	
"Two Occasions" †	The Deele	Darnell Bristol; Sid Johnson	Eyes of a Stranger	1987	
"Until You Come Back"	Whitney Houston	Daryl Simmons	My Love Is Your Love	1998	
"U Should Know"	Babyface	Jason Edmonds	Face2Face	2001	
"Walking on Air"	Babyface (featuring El DeBarge)	Daryl Simmons	Return of the Tender Lover	2015	
"The Way You Love Me" †	Karyn White	L.A. Reid; Daryl Simmons	Karyn White	1988	
"Water Runs Dry" †	Boyz II Men	—N/a	II	1994	
"We Belong Together" †	Mariah Carey	Mariah Carey; Jermaine Dupri; Manuel Seal, Jr.; Johntá Austin; Darnell Bristol; Sid Johnson; Bobby Womack; Sandra Sully; Patrick Moten	The Emancipation of Mimi	2005	
"Well Alright"	Babyface	—N/a	Poetic Justice OST	1993	
"We're Making Whoopee"	Jermaine Jackson	Daryl Simmons; L.A. Reid	You Said	1991	
"We're Not Making Love No More" †	Dru Hill	—N/a	Soul Food OST	1997	
"We've Got Love" †	Babyface	Daryl Simmons; Kameron Glasper	Return of the Tender Lover	2015	
"Wey U"	Chanté Moore	—N/a	Waiting to Exhale OST	1995	
"Whack It On Me"	Damian Dame	L.A. Reid; Daryl Simmons; Kevin Roberson; Bruce Broadus; S. Gibson; Charles Bobbit	Damian Dame	1991	
"Whatever" †	En Vogue	Keith Andes; Giuliano Franco; James Todd Smith; Osten Harvey, Jr.	EV3	1997	
"What If" †	Babyface	—N/a	Face2Face	2001	
"What the Funk"	Kat Graham	Kat Graham; Jean Yves "Jeeve" Ducornet	Love Music Funk Magic	2017	
"When Can I See You" †	Babyface	—N/a	For the Cool in You	1993	
"When I'm Crying"	Damian Dame	Daryl Simmons; Kevin Roberson	Damian Dame	1991	
"When I See You"	El DeBarge	Mischke Butler; El DeBarge; Ron Fair	Second Chance	2010	
"When You Believe" †	Whitney Houston and Mariah Carey	Stephen Schwartz	The Prince of Egypt OST / #1's / My Love is Your Love	1998	
"When Men Grow Old"	Babyface	—N/a	A Collection of His Greatest Hits	2000	
"When Your Body Gets Weak"	Babyface	—N/a	The Day	1996	
"Where Did We Go Wrong" †	Babyface and Toni Braxton	Toni Braxton	Love, Marriage & Divorce	2014	
"Where Is My Love?"	El DeBarge and Babyface	El DeBarge	Heart, Mind and Soul	1994	
"Where It Hurts"	Tamar Braxton	Bryan-Michael Cox; Tamar Braxton; LaShawn Daniels; Patrick "J. Que" Smith	Love and War	2013	
"Where Will You Go"	Babyface	—N/a	Tender Lover	1989	
"Why Me"	Michael Bolton	Michael Bolton; Lamont Dozier	All That Matters	1997	
"Whip Appeal" †	Babyface	Perri "Pebbles" Reid	Tender Lover	1989	
"Who's Gonna (Nobody)"	Chris Brown	Chris Brown; Brandon "B.A.M" Hodge; Darius Logan; Floyd "A1" Bentley; Dominique Logan; Keith Sweat; Scott Fitzgerald; Daryl Simmons	Royalty	2015	
"Why" †	3T	—N/a	Brotherhood	1995	
"Why Do I Believe"	Pebbles	—N/a	Always	1990	
"Why Does It Hurt So Bad" †	Whitney Houston	—N/a	Waiting to Exhale OST	1995	
"Why Should I Care"	Toni Braxton	—N/a	Secrets	1996	
"Willing to Forgive" †	Aretha Franklin	Daryl Simmons	Greatest Hits: 1980–1994	1994	
"Wish U Was My Girl"	Babyface	Jason Edmonds	Face2Face	2001	
"With All My Heart"	Walter & Scotty	L.A. Reid	My Brother's Keeper	1993	
"With Him"	Babyface	—N/a	Face2Face	2001	
"Woo"	Anthony Hamilton	Antonio Dixon; Brandon Coleman; Patrick "J. Que" Smith; Anthony Hamilton	Back to Love	2011	
"Woman Don't Cry"	Boyz II Men	Bill Withers	Full Circle	2002	
"Work It Out"	Babyface	Tim Kelley; Bob Robinson; Bobby Robinson; Kenton Nix; Kevin Keaton; Mohandas Dewese; Dana Goodman; Lawrence Goodman; Carlton Ridenhour; Hank Shocklee; William Drayton Jr.	Face2Face	2001	
"You Are My Life"	Michael Jackson	Michael Jackson; Carole Bayer Sager; John McClain	Invincible	2001	
"You Are the Man"	En Vogue	—N/a	Soul Food OST	1997	
"You Bring the Sunshine" †	Gina Thompson	Jon-John Robinson	NBA at 50: A Musical Celebration	1996	
"You Can't Run"	Vanessa Williams	—N/a	The Sweetest Days	1994	
"You Mean the World to Me" †	Toni Braxton	L.A. Reid; Daryl Simmons	Toni Braxton	1993	
"You Said, You Said" †	Jermaine Jackson	Daryl Simmons; Jermaine Jackson; L.A. Reid	You Said	1991	
"Young Girl"	A Few Good Men	—N/a	A Thang for You	1994	
"Your Eyes"	Xscape	Daryl Simmons	Traces of My Lipstick	1998	
"Your Joy"	Chrisette Michele	Chrisette Payne; Rob Lewis	I Am	2007	
"You'll Never Know"	Ariana Grande	Khristopher Riddick-Tynes; Leon Thomas III; Antonio Dixon	Yours Truly	2013	
"You're Makin' Me High" †	Toni Braxton	Bryce Wilson	Secrets	1996	
"You Thought Wrong"	Kelly Clarkson	Kelly Clarkson; Harvey Mason, Jr.; Damon Thomas; Tamyra Gray	Thankful	2003	
"You Want My Love"	Earth, Wind & Fire (featuring Lucky Daye)	Carl DeVonish, Jr.; Lucky Daye; Michael "Hunnid" McGregor; Skip Scarborough	TBA	2021	
"You Were There"	Babyface	—N/a	Simon Birch OST	1998	
