= Az Yet (album) =

Album by Az Yet

Studio album by Az Yet
- Released: April 30, 1996
- Recorded: 1995–1996
- Genre: R&B
- Length: 51:46
- Labels: LaFace; Arista
- Producers: Babyface; Brian McKnight; Jon B.

Az Yet chronology
Az Yet (1996)	That B U (2004)

Singles from Az Yet
- 1. "Last Night" Released: 1996; 2. "Hard to Say I'm Sorry" Released: February 3, 1997

Professional ratings
Review scores
Source	Rating
AllMusic	3/5 stars
Cash Box	(favorable)
Music Week	4/5 stars

Az Yet is the debut album by American R&B recording group Az Yet, released in 1996. The album spawned two charting singles including the lead single "Last Night" and the cover of the Chicago song, "Hard to Say I'm Sorry". As of April 2002, the album has sold over a million, being certified platinum.

== Track listing ==
No.	Title	Writer(s)	Producer(s)	Length
1.	"Last Night"	Babyface; Keith Andes	Babyface; Mervyn Warren (co.)	4:27
2.	"Saved for Someone Else"	Babyface; Andes	Babyface; Warren (co.)	4:31
3.	"Care for Me"	Babyface	Babyface; Warren (co.)	4:02
4.	"Every Little Bit of My Heart"	Andes; Babyface; Marc Nelson; Bryce Wilson	Babyface; Andes (co.); Wilson (co.)	4:13
5.	"Hard to Say I'm Sorry"	Cetera; David Foster	Babyface; Shawn Rivera (co.)	3:14
6.	"That's All I Want"	Babyface; Andes	Babyface; Warren (co.)	4:25
7.	"Secrets"	Jon B.	Jon B.; Bryce Wilson (add.)	4:33
8.	"Through My Heart (The Arrow)"	Brian McKnight	McKnight	3:46
9.	"I Don't Want to Be Lonely"	Babyface	Babyface	4:29
10.	"Sadder Than Blue"	"Bassy" Bob Brockmann; Babyface; Jeffrey Burrell	Babyface; Brockmann (co.)	4:15
11.	"Inseparable Lovers"	Rick Cousin, J. Scott	The Soul Shakers; Jon-John	4:35
12.	"Time to End the Story"	Nelson; Jon-John; Darrell Spencer	Babyface; Nelson; Jon-John	5:16

== Charts ==
Az Yet reached number 18 on the Billboard Top R&B/Hip-Hop Albums chart. Two singles from the album had success on the music charts as well. The single "Last Night" charted on four separate Billboard charts, including number one on the Hot R&B/Hip-Hop Singles and Tracks, number 4 on the Rhythmic Top 40, number 5 on the Hot Dance Music/Maxi-Singles Sales and number 9 on the Hot 100. The single "Hard to Say I'm Sorry" charted on seven separate Billboard charts, reaching number 8 on the Hot 100 and number 9 on the Rhythmic Top 40.

=== Weekly charts ===
Chart (1996–97)	Peak position
Australian Albums (ARIA)	24
Dutch Albums (Album Top 100)	8
Malaysian Albums (IFPI)	6
New Zealand Albums (RMNZ)	9
UK Albums (Official Charts)	98
UK R&B Albums (Official Charts)	16
US Billboard 200	60
US Top R&B/Hip-Hop Albums (Billboard)	18

=== Year-end charts ===
Chart (1997)	Position
Australian Albums (ARIA)	76
Dutch Albums (Album Top 100)	25
US Billboard 200	155
US Top R&B/Hip-Hop Albums (Billboard)	91

== Certifications ==
Region	Certification	Certified units/sales
Australia (ARIA)	Gold	35,000^{^}
United States (RIAA)	Platinum	1,000,000^{^}
^{^} Shipments figures based on certification alone.
