= Last Night (Az Yet song) =

1996 single by Az Yet

- Standard artwork (US CD edition pictured)

Single by Az Yet

from the album Az Yet and The Nutty Professor
- Released: 1996
- Genre: R&B
- Length: 4:27
- Label: LaFace; Arista
- Songwriters: Keith Andes; Babyface
- Producers: Babyface; Mervyn Warren

Az Yet singles chronology
"Last Night" (1996)	"Hard to Say I'm Sorry" (1997)

"Last Night" is a song by the American R&B group Az Yet, produced by Babyface and Mervyn Warren, and released as the first single from the group's debut album, Az Yet (1996). The song, released by LaFace and Arista Records, became the group's first hit, reaching number 9 on the US Billboard Hot 100, number 1 on the Billboard Hot R&B Singles chart, and number 4 on the Billboard Top 40/Rhythm-Crossover chart. Additionally, it reached number 2 in Australia, number 6 in New Zealand, and number 8 in the Netherlands. The song was also included on The Nutty Professor soundtrack.

== Critical reception ==
Larry Flick from Billboard magazine named the song "yet another gem" from the soundtrack to The Nutty Professor. He added, "Az Yet is a charismatic male quintet that aims to come across as a mature alternative to the army of smooth groups currently vying to harmonize their way to the platinum land owned by Boyz II Men. Honey-soaked notes are poured over old-school soul music carrying the unmistakable stamp of producer/writer Babyface (does this man ever take a nap?). Engaging as can be." Peter Miro from Cash Box felt that "Last Night" "is the most potent offering on their 12-track collection of ballads, with lyrics ladies will cling to endlessly." A reviewer from Music Week rated the song four out of five, adding that "the Philadelphia soul quintet show they are the masters of close harmony vocalising on this seductive debut". Ralph Tee from the magazine's RM Dance Update said, "Already a Billboard hit, and also on the Nutty Professor soundtrack it's a touch MOR vocally, though the harmonies are the standout feature beneath the shuffle beat rhythms."

== Music video ==
There are two versions of the song's accompanying music video; one with clips from The Nutty Professor and the other without.

== Personnel ==
Personnel are adapted from the album's liner notes.

- Az Yet: vocals
- Babyface: writing, production, keyboards and drum programming
- Keith Andes: writing, production, keyboards and drum programming
- Mervyn Warren: co-production (vocals)
- Brad Gilderman: engineering
- Kyle Bess, Paul Boutin: assistant engineering (recording)
- Jon Gass: mixing
- Paul Boutin, Dave Hancock: assistant engineering (mixing)
- Randy Walker: midi programming
- Ivy Skoff: production coordination

== Charts ==
=== Weekly charts ===
Chart (1996–1997)	Peak position
Australia (ARIA)	2
Europe (Eurochart Hot 100)	85
Netherlands (Dutch Top 40)	7
Netherlands (Single Top 100)	8
New Zealand (Recorded Music NZ)	6
Sweden (Sverigetopplistan)	18
UK Singles (Official Charts)	21
UK Dance (Official Charts)	24
UK Hip Hop/R&B (Official Charts)	5
US Billboard Hot 100	9
US Hot R&B Singles (Billboard)	1
US Maxi-Singles Sales (Billboard)	5
US Top 40/Mainstream (Billboard)	36
US Top 40/Rhythm-Crossover (Billboard)	4
US Cash Box Top 100	6

=== Year-end charts ===
Chart (1996)	Position
US Billboard Hot 100	52
US Hot R&B Singles (Billboard)	25
US Top 40/Rhythm-Crossover (Billboard)	36

Chart (1997)	Position
Australia (ARIA)	23
US Billboard Hot 100	71
US Hot R&B Singles (Billboard)	56
US Rhythmic Top 40 (Billboard)	53

== Certifications ==
Region	Certification	Certified units/sales
Australia (ARIA)	Platinum	70,000^{^}
United States (RIAA)	Platinum	1,100,000
^{^} Shipments figures based on certification alone.

== Release history ==
Region	Date	Format(s)	Label(s)	Ref.
United States	1996	Rhythmic contemporary radio	LaFace; Arista	
United States	October 15, 1996	Contemporary hit radio	LaFace; Arista	
Japan	October 23, 1996	CD	LaFace; Arista	

== See also ==
- R&B number-one hits of 1996 (USA)
