= Hard to Say I'm Sorry =

1982 single by Chicago

- Italian picture sleeve

Single by Chicago

from the album Chicago 16
- B-side: "Sonny Think Twice"
- Released: May 17, 1982
- Genre: Soft rock
- Length: 5:06 (album version, with "Get Away"); 3:42 (single version)
- Label: Full Moon; Warner Bros.
- Songwriters: Peter Cetera; David Foster
- Producer: David Foster

Chicago singles chronology
"Song for You" (1980)	"Hard to Say I'm Sorry" (1982)	"Love Me Tomorrow" (1982)

Music video
- "Hard to Say I'm Sorry" on YouTube

"Hard to Say I'm Sorry" is a song by American rock band Chicago. The power ballad was written by bassist Peter Cetera, who also sang the lead vocals on the track, and producer David Foster. It was released on May 17, 1982, as the lead single from the album Chicago 16. On September 11 of that year, it reached No. 1 for two weeks on the Billboard Hot 100. It was the group's second No. 1 single. It was their first top 40 hit since "No Tell Lover" in 1978 and it spent twelve weeks in the top 5 of the Billboard Hot 100.

"Hard to Say I'm Sorry" is also the band's first single to be released on Full Moon Records and Warner Bros. Records and the first single to feature new member Bill Champlin.

The single was nominated for a Grammy Award for Best Pop Performance by a Duo or Group with Vocal, and was certified gold by the Recording Industry Association of America (RIAA) in September of the same year. Songwriter Cetera, a member of the American Society of Composers, Authors and Publishers (ASCAP), won an ASCAP Pop Music Award for the song in the category, Most Performed Songs.

The song was also featured as the ending theme in the movie and soundtrack for Summer Lovers, a 1982 film written and directed by Randal Kleiser, starring Peter Gallagher, Daryl Hannah and Valerie Quennessen, and filmed on location on the island of Santorini, Greece.

== History ==
The song, as well as the album on which it is featured, was a marked departure from Chicago's traditional soft rock, horn-driven sound, taking on a polished and modern feel. With minimal horns, the track instead featured more layered synthesizers and heavier distorted guitar in a 1980s power ballad styling. A second movement of the song, "Get Away", prominently does feature the Chicago horns, and it was co-written by Robert Lamm.

Deviating from Chicago's practice of having mostly band members playing on their albums, "Hard to Say I'm Sorry" featured several session musicians. The song featured producer David Foster on the piano as well as three members of the American rock band Toto, Steve Lukather on electric guitars, also both David Paich and Steve Porcaro contributing synthesizers. The song's vocals were performed by Peter Cetera, who also plays acoustic guitar. The only other member of Chicago besides Cetera that played on the track was drummer Danny Seraphine.

"Hard to Say I'm Sorry" became the band's first single to break the top 40 of the Billboard Hot 100 since "No Tell Lover" in early 1979 and their 13th top ten single on that chart, having last done so with "Baby, What a Big Surprise" in 1977.

== Critical reception ==
The UK music publication Music Week wrote that the song "sees Chicago searching for hit feel of "If You Leave Me Now" or non-charting gem Just You 'n' Me." They also characterised "Hard to Say I'm Sorry" as "slowish, melodic, [and] lush." Billboard called it a "stately pop ballad" with "even more of an orchestral sweep than usual." The same publication ranked the song No. 2 on its list of the 50 best Chicago songs.

== Music video ==
Chicago made a music video for the song. According to Cetera, the videos for "Hard to Say I'm Sorry" and "Love Me Tomorrow" were shot on the same day. The band appears in a black colored room with diamonds on the wall.

== Charts ==
=== Weekly charts ===
Weekly chart performance for "Hard to Say I'm Sorry"
Chart (1982)	Peak position
Australia (Kent Music Report)	4
Austrian Singles Chart	5
Belgian (Flanders) Singles Chart	15
Canada RPM Top Singles	1
Canada RPM Adult Contemporary	1
German Singles Chart	6
Ireland (IRMA)	1
Italy (Musica e Dischi)	1
New Zealand Singles Chart	13
South Africa (Springbok)	14
Swiss Singles Chart	1
UK Singles Chart	4
US Billboard Hot 100	1
US Billboard Adult Contemporary	1

=== Year-end charts ===
1982 year-end chart performance for "Hard to Say I'm Sorry"
Chart (1982)	Rank
Australia (Kent Music Report)	10
Canada Top Singles (RPM)	9
Italy (FIMI)	7
Switzerland (Schweizer Hitparade)	5
UK Singles (OCC)	27
US Billboard Hot 100	10

== Certifications and sales ==
Certifications for "Hard to Say I'm Sorry"
Region	Certification	Certified units/sales
Australia (ARIA)	Gold	50,000^{^}
Canada (Music Canada)	Gold	50,000^{^}
Japan (RIAJ)	Gold	100,000^{*}
New Zealand (RMNZ)	Platinum	30,000^{‡}
Spain (Promusicae)	Gold	30,000^{‡}
United Kingdom (BPI)	Silver	250,000^{^}
United States (RIAA)	Gold	1,000,000^{^}
^{*} Sales figures based on certification alone.^{^} Shipments figures based on certification alone.^{‡} Sales+streaming figures based on certification alone.

== Az Yet version ==
"Hard to Say I'm Sorry"

Single by Az Yet featuring Peter Cetera

from the album Az Yet
- Released: February 3, 1997
- Genre: R&B
- Length: 3:17
- Label: LaFace; Arista
- Songwriters: Peter Cetera; David Foster
- Producer: Babyface

Az Yet singles chronology
"Last Night" (1996)	"Hard to Say I'm Sorry" (1997)	"You're the Inspiration" (1997)

Music video
- "Hard to Say I'm Sorry" on YouTube

American R&B group Az Yet included a cover version of "Hard to Say I'm Sorry" on their 1996 self-titled debut album, which was produced by Babyface. A remix version by David Foster was released as a single on February 3, 1997, and features vocals from Peter Cetera. Foster won a BMI Pop Award for this version. The song peaked at number seven on the UK Singles Chart and number eight on the Billboard Hot 100. It reached platinum status and was nominated for a Grammy Award for Best Performance by an R&B Group or Duo with Vocal. Aside from the David Foster remix, the single includes the album version (without Cetera), an a cappella version, and an extended remix.

=== Track listing ===
CD-single

1. "Hard to Say I'm Sorry" (David Foster Remix featuring Peter Cetera) 3:18
2. "Hard to Say I'm Sorry" (Album Version) 3:14
3. "Hard to Say I'm Sorry" (Acappella) 3:14
4. "Hard to Say I'm Sorry" (Chase Extended Mix) 5:14

=== Charts ===
==== Weekly charts ====
Chart (1997)	Peak position
Australia (ARIA)	5
Canada Top Singles (RPM)	26
Canada Adult Contemporary (RPM)	27
Europe (Eurochart Hot 100)	64
Germany (GfK)	72
Netherlands (Dutch Top 40)	3
Netherlands (Single Top 100)	3
New Zealand (Recorded Music NZ)	1
Scottish Singles Sales (Official Charts)	30
Sweden (Sverigetopplistan)	59
UK Singles (Official Charts)	7
UK Hip Hop/R&B (Official Charts)	3
US Billboard Hot 100	8
US Adult Contemporary (Billboard)	14
US Hot R&B Singles (Billboard)	20
US Rhythmic Top 40 (Billboard)	9

==== Year-end charts ====
Chart (1997)	Position
Australia (ARIA)	31
Netherlands (Dutch Top 40)	11
Netherlands (Single Top 100)	28
New Zealand (RIANZ)	13
US Billboard Hot 100	19
US Hot R&B Singles (Billboard)	60
US Rhythmic Top 40 (Billboard)	20
US Top 40/Mainstream (Billboard)	31

==== Decade-end charts ====
Chart (1990–1999)	Position
Netherlands (Dutch Top 40)	89

=== Certifications ===
Region	Certification	Certified units/sales
Australia (ARIA)	Platinum	70,000^{^}
New Zealand (RMNZ)	Platinum	10,000^{*}
United States (RIAA)	Platinum	1,100,000
^{*} Sales figures based on certification alone.^{^} Shipments figures based on certification alone.

=== Release history ===
Region	Date	Format(s)	Label(s)	Ref.
United States	January 7, 1997	Rhythmic contemporary radio	LaFace; Arista	
United States	February 3, 1997	12-inch vinyl; CD; cassette	LaFace; Arista	
United Kingdom	June 9, 1997	12-inch vinyl; CD; cassette	LaFace; Arista	

== Other versions ==
- In 1983, Hong Kong singer Leslie Cheung released a Cantonese cover version with Chinese title "難以再說對不起" for his album 風繼續吹.
- In 2002, German electronic dance music group Aquagen had a hit with their song of the same title, which sampled "Hard to Say I'm Sorry". This version reached No. 33 on the UK Singles Chart.
- In 2015, country music singer Tim McGraw released a "behind-the-scenes" video of him and his band performing "Hard to Say I'm Sorry" as a warm-up for his show in Chicago. At the end of the song he turns to the camera and says, "Hello, Chicago."
- In January 2017, Roger Federer tweeted a video of him singing the song with fellow professional tennis players Tommy Haas and Grigor Dimitrov, with David Foster at the piano, while at the Australian Open. Haas is the son-in-law of Foster.

== See also ==
- List of RPM number-one singles of 1982
- List of number-one hits of 1982 (Switzerland)
- List of Hot 100 number-one singles of 1982 (U.S.)
- List of number-one adult contemporary singles of 1982 (U.S.)
