= Eyes of a Stranger (album) =

Studio album by the Deele
- Released: August 18, 1987
- Recorded: 1986–1987
- Studio: Galaxy Sound Studios, Silverlake Studios, Studio Masters (Hollywood, California)
- Genre: R&B, disco, funk
- Length: 37:49
- Label: SOLAR Records
- Producer: L.A. Reid, Babyface

The Deele chronology
Material Thangz (1985)	Eyes of a Stranger (1987)	Invitation to Love (1993)

Professional ratings
Review scores
Source	Rating
Allmusic	4/5 stars

Eyes of a Stranger is an album released by the R&B band the Deele in 1987.

The third album released by the Deele, it became the band's most commercially successful album, on the strength of what is perhaps the group's best-known hit, the R&B top 5 and pop top ten single, "Two Occasions," along with the R&B top ten follow-up, "Shoot 'Em Up Movies." It was shortly after the release of this album that primary group songwriters Kenny "Babyface" Edmonds and L.A. Reid left the band to pursue production work.

The album was certified Gold by the RIAA.

== Track listing ==
1. Two Occasions (Kenny "Babyface" Edmonds, Darnell "Dee" Bristol, Sid Johnson) - 4:17
2. Shoot 'Em Up Movies (Kenny Nolan) - 4:20
3. Let No One Separate Us (Darnell "Dee" Bristol, Antonio "L.A." Reid, Kenny "Babyface" Edmonds) - 4:15
4. Eyes of a Stranger (Daryl Simmons, Carlos "Satin" Greene) - 4:52
5. Can-U-Dance (Carlos "Satin" Greene, Antonio "L.A." Reid, Dwain Mitchell) - 4:34
6. She Wanted (Darnell "Dee" Bristol, Kevin "Kayo" Roberson, Antonio "L.A." Reid) - 4:40
7. Hip Chic (Carlos "Satin" Greene, Les Collier, Darnell "Dee" Bristol, Antonio "L.A." Reid, Kevin "Kayo" Roberson) - 4:15
8. So Many Thangz (Darnell "Dee" Bristol, Kenny "Babyface" Edmonds, D. Simmons) - 5:18
9. Eyes of a Stranger (Reprise) (Carlos "Satin" Greene, Simmons) - 1:18

== Chart performance ==
Chart (1988)	Peak position	Certification
U.S. Billboard 200	54	Gold
U.S. Top R&B Albums	5	Gold

=== Singles ===
Year	Single	Chart positions	
Year	Single	US Pop	US R&B
1987	"Can-U-Dance"	-	48
1987	"Two Occasions"	10 (1988)	4
1988	"Shoot Em Up Movies"	-	10
