= Return of the Tender Lover =

Studio album by Babyface
- Released: December 4, 2015
- Studio: Brandon's Way Recording (Los Angeles, California)
- Length: 42:41
- Label: Def Jam
- Producers: Babyface; Daryl Simmons

Babyface chronology
Love, Marriage & Divorce (2014)	Return of the Tender Lover (2015)	Girls Night Out (2022)

Singles from Return of the Tender Lover
- 1. "We've Got Love" Released: August 4, 2015; 2. "Exceptional" Released: November 27, 2015

Return of the Tender Lover is the eighth studio album from American R&B singer Babyface. It was released December 4, 2015, on Def Jam Recordings. The album pays homage to his classic 1989 album, Tender Lover and serves as the follow-up to his last album Grown & Sexy (2005). It is his first solo album of new studio material in 10 years.

While its lyrics focus mainly on themes of romance, perseverance and devotion, Return of the Tender Lover incorporates pop-soul love songs as well as elements of old-school R&B that evokes some his earlier work. As a result, the album received generally positive reviews from critics who praised the album's production, songwriting and direction. "We've Got Love" was released as the album's lead single on August 4, 2015.

== Background ==
Following the release of his collaborative album with Toni Braxton, Love, Marriage & Divorce (2014) which was a commercial success, Babyface finished Return of The Tender Lover with Daryl Simmons and Kameron Glasper. Babyface said of the process: "It was an organic thing where the songs came fast — I didn't want to do too many songs, just an old-school album, eight songs, and just make sure they're eight good ones". Babyface has called the album "Unapologetic R&B" and said: "It doesn't have to be the kind of hi-hats or kick or 808s [sound]. It's just going to be a real drummer, bass player, guitar player, piano player. It's going to feel real good based off of [sic] musicianship." Return of The Tender Lover was the singer's first solo album since Playlist (2007), and his first consisting of only original material since Grown & Sexy (2005).

== Critical reception ==
Professional ratings
Aggregate scores
Source	Rating
Metacritic	76/100
Review scores
Source	Rating
AllMusic	3/5 stars
The Boston Globe	B−
Consequence of Sound	3/5 stars
The Guardian	3/5 stars
Pitchfork	7.2/10
Rolling Stone	3.5/5 stars

Return of the Tender Lover received generally positive reviews from music critics. At Metacritic, which assigns a normalized rating out of 100 to reviews from mainstream critics, the album received an average score of 76, indicating "generally favorable reviews". Andy Kellman of AllMusic ranked the album "among Babyface's best" and called it "smooth, all about romance, devotion and perseverance." Ken Capobianco of The Boston Globe gave the album a B−, stating that "Babyface remains polished yet funky." He went on to add that Babyface "proclaims his love for women for who they are, instead of what they can do for him." Pitchfork's Ivy Nelson called it "traditional, in the sense that they don't attempt to update Babyface's sound and instead lean comfortably on a long, established career. This dedication to tradition and honoring of his craft is less a throwback than a micro-adjustment of an enduring formula."

Dave Simpson from The Guardian noted that "this is old-school R&B with a fine glass finish, the musicianship and production audibly expensive and the man's voice so honeyed it presumably requires the attentions of worker bees [...] The best tracks turn up the temperature from cool to simmer: "Love and Devotion" has something of the airy atmosphere of Marvin Gaye's lurve records, while "I Want You" (featuring After 7) finds the old smoothie coming dangerously close to working up a sweat." Rolling Stone' David Turner called Return of the Tender Lover a "smooth, gentle throwback LP", while Pat Levy, writing for Consequence of Sound, described it as "an album so rich with legitimate emotions that it feels like sitting next to a warm hearth after years in the cold world of artists like The Weeknd and Drake."

== Commercial performance ==
In the United States, the album debuted at number 39 on the Billboard 200, with 19,000 first-week sales. It also opened at number six on the Top R&B/Hip-Hop Albums chart, becoming Babyface's seventh non-consecutive album to reach the top ten.

== Track listing ==
All tracks produced by Babyface; except "I Want You" produced by Babyface and Daryl Simmons.

Return of the Tender Lover track listing
No.	Title	Writer(s)	Length
1.	"We've Got Love"	Kenneth "Babyface" Edmonds; Daryl Simmons; Kameron Glasper	4:49
2.	"Fight for Love"	Edmonds; Simmons	4:58
3.	"Exceptional"	Edmonds; Simmons; Glasper	5:40
4.	"Walking on Air" (featuring El DeBarge)	Edmonds; Simmons	3:54
5.	"I Want You" (featuring After 7)	Edmonds; Simmons	4:21
6.	"Love and Devotion"	Edmonds; Simmons	3:43
7.	"Standing Ovation"	Edmonds; Simmons	4:45
8.	"Something Bout You"	Edmonds; Simmons; Glasper	5:58
9.	"Our Love"	Edmonds; Simmons; Glasper	4:37
Total length:			42:41

== Personnel ==
Credits adapted from liner notes.

- Babyface – vocals, writer, producer, keyboards, executive producer, guitar, background vocals, drum programming, A&R
- Tony Russell – bass
- Demonte Posey – Hammond B3 organ
- Andre Delano – saxophone
- Daryl Simmons – writer, producer
- Kameron Glasper – writer, background vocals
- Richie Pena – drums
- Walter Barnes – bass
- Brandon Coleman – Wurlitzer
- After 7 – vocals, background vocals
- El DeBarge – vocals, background vocals
- Michael Ripoll – guitar
- Greg Phillinganes – piano
- Lemar Carter – drums
- Nathan East – bass
- Paul Boutin -recording, mixing, percussion
- Herb Powers, Jr. – mastering
- Randee St. Nicholas – photography
- Kyledidthis – Art direction, design

== Charts ==
=== Weekly charts ===
Weekly chart performance for Return of the Tender Lover
Chart (2015–16)	Peak position
US Billboard 200	39
US Top R&B/Hip-Hop Albums (Billboard)	5

=== Year-end charts ===
Year-end chart performance for Return of the Tender Lover
Chart (2016)	Position
US Top R&B/Hip-Hop Albums (Billboard)	42
