= Girls Night Out (Babyface album) =

Studio album by Babyface
- Released: October 21, 2022
- Genre: R&B
- Length: 39:08
- Label: Capitol
- Producers: Babyface; The Rascals; D'Mile

Babyface chronology
Return of the Tender Lover (2015)	Girls Night Out (2022)

Singles from Girls Night Out
- 1. "Keeps on Fallin'" Released: June 17, 2022; 2. "Seamless" Released: August 12, 2022; 3. "Game Over" Released: September 15, 2022

Girls Night Out is the ninth studio album by American R&B singer Babyface. It was released on October 21, 2022, signed by A&R Chris Turner through Capitol Records. It is Babyface's first album released through Capitol, and includes collaborations with only female artists—Angie Martinez, La La Anthony, Ari Lennox, Kehlani, Ella Mai, Queen Naija, Coco Jones, Tiana Major9, Tink, Baby Tate, Muni Long, Amaarae, Sevyn Streeter, Tkay Maidza and Doechii. The extended version of the album contains additional collaborations with Jenevieve and Bjrnck.

Girls Night Out was nominated for Best R&B Album at the 66th Grammy Awards.

== Background ==
Babyface originally had the idea for the album as he had gained "interest from younger fans" following his appearance on the Verzuz webcast with Teddy Riley in 2020. He compared the process of making the album to that of the Waiting to Exhale soundtrack, which he wrote and produced for an all-female line-up of performers including Whitney Houston in 1995. For Girls Night Out, Babyface enlisted female performers who primarily wrote the songs, as well as young producers to "keep it relevant and new", an idea that was formulated by A&R Rika Tischendorf. Several producers Babyface worked with "asked to make 'a Babyface classic'", which he denied, and pointed to as a reason why he "sang very little on it" as he did not want to be seen as "the creepy uncle" doing duets with younger women.

== Critical reception ==
Professional ratings
Review scores
Source	Rating
AllMusic	3/5 stars

Andy Kellman of AllMusic found the album to have a "rotational co-headliner nature" with "Babyface most often in a supporting role" that "plays out like an experiment or exercise rather than a proper album". Kellman noted that most of the songs "would be fine deep cuts on LPs by Babyface's guests" and that there are "echoes from [his] past [...] integrated in clever, subtle fashion".

Writing for Renowned for Sound, Grace Twomey described Girls Night Out as "a musically restrained catalogue of relationship sagas that could just as easily be titled 13 Songs About Love and Hate" and opined that it "reveals Babyface's secret to a long, prolific production career: keeping up with the times, whilst paying homage to the sonic blueprint of his past – an inimitable recipe his many followers have been longing to taste again".

== Track listing ==
Girls Night Out track listing
No.	Title	Writer(s)	Producer(s)	Length
1.	"Intro" (featuring Angie Martinez and La La Anthony)		Babyface	0:38
2.	"Liquor" (featuring Ari Lennox)	Kenneth B. Edmonds; Austin Owens; Courtney Salter; Derrick Milano; Gabriel Lambirth	Babyface; Ayo; Gabriel Lambirth; Paul Boutin^{[a]}	3:18
3.	"Seamless" (featuring Kehlani)	Edmonds; Kehlani Parrish; Khristopher Riddick-Tynes; Leon Thomas III	Babyface^{[b]}; Khristopher Riddick-Tynes^{[b]}; Leon Thomas III	3:15
4.	"Keeps on Fallin'" (featuring Ella Mai)	Edmonds; Ella Mai Howell; Riddick-Tynes; Daryl Simmons; Dernst Emile II	Babyface; D'Mile	2:55
5.	"Game Over" (with Queen Naija)	Edmonds; Queen Naija Bulls; Riddick-Tynes; Dylan Wiggins; London Jae; Rob Bisel	Babyface; Rob Bisel; Sir Dylan; Riddick-Tynes	3:28
6.	"Simple" (with Coco Jones)	Edmonds; Courtney Jones; Kenneth Paryo; Milton Adams II	Babyface; Kenneth Paryo; Miltone; Boutin^{[a]}	2:31
7.	"Say Less" (with Tiana Major9)	Edmonds; Tiana Thomas-Ambersley; Riddick-Tynes; Blair Ferguson; Jared Solomon; Adams II	Babyface; BLK; Solomonophonic; Riddick-Tynes; Boutin^{[a]}	2:56
8.	"Whatever" (with Tink)	Edmonds; Trinity Home; Deandre Sumpter; Javan Wallace; Perri Reid	Babyface; Dizzy Banko; Drumma; Boutin^{[a]}	3:19
9.	"Don't Even Think About It" (with Baby Tate)	Edmonds; Adams II; Nandish Patel; Tate Farris; Sahil Datta	Sahil Datta; ThankYouDish; Boutin^{[a]}	3:12
10.	"The Recipe" (with Muni Long)	Edmonds; Priscilla Renea; Riddick-Tynes; Aliandro Prawl; Julian Mason	Babyface; Riddick-Tynes; LilJuMadeDaBeat; Ali Roots A16; Boutin^{[a]}	3:08
11.	"One Good Thing" (featuring Amaarae)	Edmonds; Ama Serwah Genfi; Jephte "Kyu" Steed Baloki; Kwame Kwei-Armah Jr.	Babyface; KZ; Kyu	3:34
12.	"G Wagon" (featuring Sevyn Streeter and Tkay Maidza)	Edmonds; Amber Streeter; Brandon Hesson; Brandon "B.A.M." Hodge; Mayila Jones; Adams II; Shelton Grant; Takudzwa Maidza	Babyface; B.A.M.; Boutin^{[a]}	3:32
13.	"Girls Night Out" (with Doechii)	Edmonds; Jaylah Hickmon; Adams II; Paryo	Babyface; Paryo; Miltone; Boutin^{[a]}	3:21
Total length:				39:08

Extended version bonus tracks
No.	Title	Length
14.	"Sometimes" (with Jenevieve)	3:15
15.	"If You Knew How" (with Bjrnck)	2:51
Total length:		45:14

Notes

- ^[a] indicates a vocal producer
- ^[b] indicates both a music and vocal producer

== Personnel ==
Information is based on the album's liner notes

- Babyface - music programming (2–4, 7, 9–13), guitar (3, acoustic on 5, 7, 10–11), keyboards (4), bass played by (7)
- Ayo the Producer - drum machine (2)
- B.A.M. - keyboards, drum machine (12)
- Rob Bisel - keyboards, drum machine (5)
- BLK Beats - musical arrangement, keyboards (7)
- Paul Boutin - percussion (5, 7)
- D'Mile - music programming, drum machine, keyboards (4)
- Sahil Datta - keyboards, drum machine (9)
- Dizzy Banko - additional keyboards, drum machine (8)
- Sir Dylan - keyboards, drum machine (5)
- KZ - keyboards, drum machine (11)
- Gabriel Lambirth - guitar, keyboards (2)
- LilJuMadeDaBeat - keyboards, drum machine (10)
- Miltone - keyboards, drum machine (6, 13)
- Ali P - keyboards, drum machine (10)
- Kenneth Parvo - keyboards, drum machine (6, 13)
- Kristopher Riddick-Tynes - musical arrangement (3), Keyboards (3, 5, 10), drum machine (3–4, 7, 10)
- Kyu Steed - keyboards, drum machine (11)
- Leon Thomas III - bass played by (3)
- Javan Wallace - additional keyboards, drum machine (8)

== Charts ==
Chart performance for Girls Night Out
Chart (2022)	Peak position
US Billboard 200	166
US Top R&B Albums (Billboard)	22
