= Paul Boutin (sound engineer) =

French-American sound engineer

- Genres: Soul; R&B; pop; rock
- Occupations: Sound mixer; audio engineer; vocal producer
- Years active: 1995–present
- Website: mixedbypaulboutin.com

Paul Boutin is a French-born American sound mixer and audio engineer, best known for his collaborations with R&B singer Kenneth "Babyface" Edmonds.

Boutin contributed to over 60 gold or platinum certified songs performed by acts such as Michael Jackson, Whitney Houston, Barbra Streisand, Stevie Wonder, Celine Dion, John Legend, Aretha Franklin, Mariah Carey, Phil Collins, Janet Jackson, John Mellencamp, Lionel Richie, Toni Braxton, Alicia Keys, Usher, Pink, Jamie Foxx, Ariana Grande, TLC, Boyz II Men and Fall Out Boy, among others. As an engineer, Boutin won a Grammy Award in 2015 for recording and mixing Love, Marriage & Divorce by Toni Braxton & Babyface (Best R&B Album). His work is also credited on several other Grammy nominated albums and singles since 1995, including two direct nominations in 1999 and 2018.

== Early career ==
Paul Boutin (born 1970 in Paris) studied biological engineering in France before moving to the United States in 1991. He attended Berklee College of Music in Boston where he specialized in music production and sound engineering.

In 1995, Paul Boutin went to Los Angeles and worked as assistant engineer at Paramount and Sound Chambers Studios. He was finally hired at Record Plant Studios and became assistant of confirmed engineers Humberto Gatica and Brad Gilderman.

At Record Plant, Paul Boutin was involved in recording/mixing sessions for Liza Minnelli then Celine Dion and Babyface, more specifically for the album Falling Into You (including contributions to singles "All By Myself" and "Because You Loved Me"), the Waiting to Exhale soundtrack and Babyface’s solo record The Day.

In 1996, Kenneth "Babyface" Edmonds opened his own private studio “Brandon’s Way Recording” in Los Angeles where Paul Boutin joined him.

== Selected discography: 1990s and 2000s ==
=== Albums and singles ===
At Brandon’s Way, Paul Boutin worked on major projects that earned multiple RIAA certifications and Grammy nominations. Among those certified/nominated projects, here is a selection of records with significant involvement by Paul Boutin (recording and/or mixing) :

- Evolution (Boyz II Men, 1997) including the platinum single "A Song For Mama". This album was Grammy nominated for “Best R&B Album” in 1998.
- My Way (Usher, 1997)
- My Love Is Your Love (Whitney Houston, 1998) including the gold single "When You Believe" featuring Mariah Carey. This album was Grammy nominated for “Best R&B Album” in 2000.
- Mary (Mary J. Blige, 1999) including the song "Don’t Waste Your Time" Grammy nominated for “Best R&B Performance by a duo/group” in 2000
- FanMail (TLC, 1999) including the gold single "Hands Up". This album was Grammy nominated for “Album Of The Year“ and won “Best R&B Album” in 2000.
- Can't Take Me Home (Pink, 2000) including the Billboard Hot 100 #5 song "Most Girls"
- The Heat (Toni Braxton, 2000). This album was Grammy nominated for “Best R&B Album” in 2001.
- Luther Vandross (2001)
- Just Whitney (Whitney Houston, 2002) including the gold single "Try It On My Own"
- Thankful (Kelly Clarkson, 2003) and Soulful (Ruben Studdard, 2003) including Billboard Hot 100 #2 song "Flying Without Wings"
- Words & Music (John Mellencamp, 2004)
- Infinity on High (Fall Out Boy, 2007) including the gold single "Thnks fr the mmrs"
- The Makings Of a Man (Jaheim, 2007)

Otherwise, between 1996 and 2007, Paul Boutin engineered or co-engineered all the albums recorded by Babyface as solo artist. Those records are including Christmas with Babyface (1998), Face2Face (2001), Grown & Sexy (2005) and Playlist (2007).

=== Movies and television soundtracks ===
After being credited for his work as assistant on the Waiting to Exhale soundtrack, Paul Boutin worked on several original soundtracks between 1995 and 2005. On the R&B side, he co-engineered most of the Soul Food soundtrack in 1997 including work on the gold singles "I Care 'bout You" and "We're Not Making Love No More". On the Pop/Rock side, Paul Boutin brought an important contribution to the recording of the Josie and The Pussycats soundtrack in 2001. Those two major projects were helmed by Kenny “Babyface” Edmonds.

Paul Boutin recorded the Grammy nominated song "When You Believe" performed by Whitney Houston and Mariah Carey in 1998 for the Prince of Egypt soundtrack as well as "How Can I Not Love You" performed by Joy Enriquez in 1999 for the Anna and The King soundtrack. This song was nominated in 2000 for a Golden Globe Award (Best Original Song).

He also contributed to television projects including the engineering of the song "The Way Love Goes" (performed by Al Green and produced by Babyface, main theme of the Soul Food Series). The song was nominated in 2001 for an Emmy Award (Outstanding Original Main Title Theme Music).

=== Special projects and production ===
In 2004, Paul Boutin engineered the cover version of "Wake Up Everybody". Produced by Babyface, the song urged young Americans to vote and was performed by a supergroup including numerous R&B/Hip-Hop singers and rappers such as Brandy, Missy Elliott, Monica, Akon, Fabolous, Eve, Jaheim, Wyclef Jean, Jadakiss and Musiq among others.

During summer 2008, Paul Boutin flew across the United States as engineer/mixer of "Just Stand Up". Produced by Babyface and LA Reid, this song was performed by an all-star charity group including R&B, Pop, Rock and Country singers such as Beyoncé, Sheryl Crow, Mary J. Blige, LeAnn Rimes, Fergie, Mariah Carey, Carrie Underwood, Leona Lewis, Rihanna and Natasha Bedingfield among others. Certified double platinum, the song was performed live during the first Telethon Stand Up To Cancer in September 2008.

In addition to his work as sound engineer, Paul Boutin produced the whole album One Less Dream by Morris Brothers (2007, Miles High Record). He also played piano, keyboards and percussions on this record.

== Recent discography: 2010s and 2020s ==
From the end of the 2000s, Paul Boutin has been more focused on mixing. He’s still working closely with Babyface and Toni Braxton as well as producers Antonio Dixon and The Rascals.

=== Mixing and vocal production ===
As engineer/mixer, Paul Boutin won a Grammy Award with artists Toni Braxton and Babyface for his work on Love, Marriage & Divorce (Best R&B Album in 2015).

Furthermore, he contributed to two other Grammy nominated albums in 2015 with Partners by Barbra Streisand (Best Traditional Pop Vocal Album) and Forever Yours by Smokie Norful (Best Gospel Album).

Paul Boutin engineered in 2015-2016 (recording, mixing, percussions) the albums Return of the Tender Lover by Babyface and Timeless by After 7, respectively #2 and #4 on the Billboard Top R&B albums chart.

In 2018, Paul Boutin is credited as vocal producer, engineer and mixer of Sex and Cigarettes, the ninth studio album by Toni Braxton. This record was nominated for a Grammy Award (Best R&B Album).

Spell my Name, the tenth album by Toni Braxton, is released in 2020. Paul Boutin is co-executive producer, vocal producer and mixer of the project.

=== Works and credits ===
Here is a selection of recent records (album, singles) including songs recorded and/or mixed by Paul Boutin.

- 2011 : Fly on the Wall, Twenty by Boyz II Men and The Letter by Avant including first single "Kiss Goodbye"
- 2011 : Back to Love by Anthony Hamilton nominated for “Best R&B Album” and including Billboard Adult R&B #1 single "Pray For Me", also nominated for “Best R&B song”.
- 2012 : Girl on Fire by Alicia Keys. This gold album won a Grammy Award in 2013 (Best R&B Album). Paul Boutin also earned a TEC Award nomination for his work on this record.
- 2013 : Christmas Kisses and Yours Truly by Ariana Grande (certified platinum) including the second single "Baby I"
- 2013 : Loved Me Back To Life by Celine Dion
- 2014 : Love, Marriage & Divorce by Toni Braxton and Babyface. Paul Boutin engineered and mixed the whole Grammy winning album including Billboard Adult R&B #1 single "Hurt You".
- 2014 : Forever Yours by Smokie Norful, Game Changer by Johnny Gill and Beautiful (Platinum Edition) by Jessica Mauboy including "Can I Get A Moment?" (certified gold in Australia)
- 2014 : Partners by Barbra Streisand (certified platinum) with the co-engineering of the duets with Babyface (2), John Legend, Stevie Wonder, Lionel Richie and Blake Shelton
- 2014 : Gypsy Heart by Colbie Caillat (including the platinum single "Try") and Aretha Franklin Sings The Great Diva Classics
- 2015 : Right Here, Right Now by Jordin Sparks, Nine by Samantha Jade and Free TC by Ty Dolla Sign (certified gold)
- 2015 : Return of the Tender Lover by Babyface
- 2016 : Timeless by After 7 including the Billboard Adult R&B #3 single "Runnin' Out"
- 2017 : Johnny Mathis Sings The Great New American Songbook
- 2018 : Sex and Cigarettes by Toni Braxton including the Billboard Adult R&B#1 single "Long as I Live" co-written, engineered and mixed by Paul Boutin. The song earned two Grammy nominations (Best R&B Song, Best R&B Performance) in 2018 and won the NAACP Image Award for Outstanding Song (Traditional) in 2019.
- 2018 : This Christmas Day by Jessie J
- 2019 : "Love Again" by Brandy and Daniel Caesar, the duet is included on the albums B7 and Case Study 01.
- 2020 : Love Always Wins by Kem and Spell My Name by Toni Braxton including Billboard Adult R&B #1 single "Do It".
