= Just Stand Up! =

Single by Artists Stand Up to Cancer
- Released: September 2, 2008
- Recorded: 2008
- Studio: Brandon's Way Recording Studios (Los Angeles, CA); Starstruck Studios (Nashville, TN); Chicago Recording Company (Chicago, IL); Legacy Studios (New York, NY); Roc the Mic (New York, NY); Capitol Studios (Los Angeles, CA)
- Genre: Pop; R&B
- Length: 3:34
- Songwriters: Babyface; Ronnie Walton
- Producers: Babyface; Antonio "L.A." Reid

Audio video
- "Just Stand Up!" on YouTube

"Just Stand Up!" is a song performed by an all-star female charity supergroup of pop, R&B, rock, and country artists during the telethon "Stand Up to Cancer". The group was purposely billed as Artists Stand Up to Cancer to the public. The song reached number 7 in Italy, number 10 in Canada, and number 11 in the US and Ireland.

== Background ==
American songwriter and producer Antonio "L.A." Reid conceived of the collaboration after a meeting with the founder of Stand Up to Cancer, which benefited from the proceeds of the record. Reid co-produced the track with American singer Kenneth "Babyface" Edmonds, and the single was released on August 21, 2008.

The singers performed the song live on the "Stand Up to Cancer" special, which aired simultaneously on US TV networks ABC, CBS and NBC on September 5, 2008.

The single was re-released on September 30, 2008, with the original recording, as well as the audio of the live performance. The CD was enhanced so it had special features for a computer. A music video was not produced for the single.

== Performers (in order of appearance) ==
- Beyoncé
- Carrie Underwood
- Rihanna
- Miley Cyrus
- Sheryl Crow (only on studio version) or Nicole Scherzinger (only on live version)
- Fergie
- Leona Lewis
- Keyshia Cole
- Natasha Bedingfield
- LeAnn Rimes (only on studio version)
- Melissa Etheridge (only on studio version)
- Mary J. Blige
- Ciara
- Mariah Carey
- Ashanti

== Chart performance ==
The song debuted on the Billboard Hot 100 at 78 on the week of September 13, 2008. The next week it was the greatest sales gainer and jumped 67 places to land at number 11. The next week, however, the song fell to number 36. It also peaked on the Billboard Pop 100 chart at 18. As of October 2013, "Just Stand Up!" had sold 393,000 digital downloads in the US. On the UK Singles Chart, it debuted at number 39, before climbing the chart to number 26. On the Canadian Hot 100 chart it made a "Hot Shot Debut" at number 10 in the week of September 11, 2008, based on downloads.

== Live performance ==
The live performance was held on the "Stand Up 2 Cancer" event on September 5, 2008, aired by multiple channels. All the original artists appeared for the performance, except LeAnn Rimes, Sheryl Crow and Melissa Etheridge, with the addition of Nicole Scherzinger from The Pussycat Dolls singing the parts of Sheryl Crow. The live performance is slightly different from the original song available for download. The live performance video is available for purchase on iTunes.

== Track listing ==
- CD single
1. "Just Stand Up!" – 3:37
2. "Just Stand Up!" (Live Video) – 4:28

== Credits and personnel ==
Vocalists

- With vocals – Mariah Carey, Carrie Underwood, Beyoncé, Mary J. Blige, Rihanna, Fergie, Sheryl Crow, Melissa Etheridge, Natasha Bedingfield, Miley Cyrus, Leona Lewis, Keyshia Cole, LeAnn Rimes, Ciara, Ashanti and Nicole Scherzinger (only on live version)
- Mariah Carey and Melissa Etheridge appears courtesy of Island Records.
- Beyoncé appears courtesy of Columbia.
- Mary J. Blige appears courtesy of Geffen.
- Rihanna appears courtesy of Def Jam Recordings.
- Fergie and Sheryl Crow appears courtesy of A&M Records.
- Natasha Bedingfield appears courtesy of Epic Records.
- Miley Cyrus appears courtesy of Hollywood Records.
- Leona Lewis appears courtesy of Sony BMG/Syco/J.
- Carrie Underwood appears courtesy of Arista Nashville.
- Keyshia Cole appears courtesy of Interscope-Geffen-A&M.
- LeAnn Rimes appears courtesy of Asylum-Curb.
- Ashanti appears courtesy of Universal Records
- Ciara appears courtesy of Zomba, Sony BMG.
- Nicole Scherzinger appears courtesy of Polydor, A&M and Interscope (only on live version)

Production

Credits adapted from Discogs.

- Kenneth "Babyface" Edmonds: writer, producer, keyboards, acoustic guitar, bass, drum programming
- Ronnie "Preach" Walton: writer, co-producer, keyboards, drum programming
- Antonio "LA" Reid: executive producer, producer
- Kenya Ivey: additional background vocals
- Paul Boutin: recording and mixing
- Alejandro Venguer, Brian Garten, Marcos Tovar: additional recording
- Karen Kwak: project coordinator

== Charts ==
Chart (2008)	Peak position
Australia (ARIA)	39
Austria (Ö3 Austria Top 40)	73
Canada Hot 100 (Billboard)	10
Ireland (IRMA)	11
Italy (FIMI)	7
Japan (Japan Hot 100)	85
New Zealand (Recorded Music NZ)	19
Sweden (Sverigetopplistan)	51
UK Singles (Official Charts)	26
US Billboard Hot 100	11
US Adult Contemporary (Billboard)	12
US Adult Pop Airplay (Billboard)	25
US Hot R&B/Hip-Hop Songs (Billboard)	27
US Pop Airplay (Billboard)	30

== Certifications ==
Region	Certification	Certified units/sales
United States (RIAA) Video release	2× Platinum	100,000^{^}
^{^} Shipments figures based on certification alone.
