= Sonny Think Twice =

Song by Chicago

from the album Chicago 16
- A-side: "Hard to Say I'm Sorry"
- Released: May 1982
- Recorded: 1982
- Genre: Rock
- Length: 4:01
- Label: Full Moon; Warner Bros.
- Songwriters: Bill Champlin; Danny Seraphine
- Producer: David Foster

"Sonny Think Twice" is a song by the American rock band Chicago. It was released as the seventh track on their sixteenth album Chicago 16 and the B-side of "Hard to Say I'm Sorry". It was written by Bill Champlin and drummer Danny Seraphine prior to the selection of David Foster as their new producer. Champlin and Seraphine composed the song in a key that they believed would be comfortable for Peter Cetera to sing in, with Champlin handling some of the song's additional vocals.

== Reception ==
Something Else! Reviews described "Sonny Think Twice" as a funky and powerful track, noting that despite producer David Foster's use of Moog bass, the song "has heft," with Danny Seraphine's drumming fitting comfortably within its groove and giving it a solid rhythmic foundation. A review published in the Observer-Reporter described “Sonny Think Twice” as having an Earth, Wind & Fire–like feel, highlighting its rhythmic groove and soulful production style reminiscent of 1970s funk and R&B influences.
