= Sidney DeWayne =

American songwriter

Sid 'Uncle Jamz' Johnson is an American songwriter, producer and personal manager.

== Career ==
He co-wrote Midnight Star's early 1980s ballad "Slow Jam", and The Deele's "Two Occasions" (for which he received a BMI award) with Babyface. He received another BMI award for Field Mob's "Sick of Being Lonely". He was also credited as a co-writer of Mariah Carey's "We Belong Together," which took elements from "Two Occasions." He has co-written, produced or executive produced, Billboard charting singles for Manchild, The Boys, Shalamar, The Mac Band, Dynasty, Renaizzance, Next, Field Mob and Suthern Klick, plus album tracks for Babyface, Midnight Star, Ron Banks of The Dramatics, Usher and Monica, The Whispers and Field Mob, plus the Soul Food (soundtrack). His works have appeared on seven RIAA gold albums, five platinum albums and four multi-platinum albums. He was inducted into the Soul Music Hall of Fame in 2019. Additionally he has two Grammy participation awards for Mariah Carey's "We Belong Together".

On August 30, 2006, at the BMI Urban Music Awards in the Roseland Ballroom, New York City, Johnson received four awards as a writer and publisher on Mariah Carey's "We Belong Together".

Johnson now heads M.E.C.A.P., an entertainment company that handles songwriting, record production, entertainment consultation and management consultation. He manages: hip-hop acts: Twelve (of Indianapolis) and Starz Of Da Bizarre (of Portland, Oregon); R&B songstress Sasé (Florida); and singer/acoustic guitarist Damon Karl (Indianapolis); singers Kelsi Marie (Indianapolis); singer T.Hill (Sacramento); guitarist/singer Starm (Los Angeles); and r&b vocal group 4Cast (Indianapolis). Plus actor/models Greg Lismon Jr. (Arizona) and Da'Rell (Indianapolis).

He also does entertainment consultation for various acts and is aided by his assistant Charles Suttice. Additionally he partners with music producers DJGuyWes, E-Bo and Nut Bush. He has a YouTube Channel for his acts called MECAP Music.
