= Playlist (Babyface album) =

Studio album by Babyface
- Released: September 18, 2007
- Length: 40:45
- Label: Mercury
- Producer: Babyface

Babyface chronology
Grown & Sexy (2005)	Playlist (2007)	Love, Marriage & Divorce (2014)

Singles from Playlist
- 1. "Fire and Rain" Released: 2007; 2. "Not Going Nowhere" Released: 2007

Playlist is the seventh studio album by American singer Babyface. It was released by Mercury Records on September 18, 2007, in the United States. His debut with the then-newly re-launched label, following his departure from Arista Records, Playlist was Babyface's first cover album. It consists of eight cover versions of folk rock and soft rock songs, including Dave Loggins' "Please Come to Boston" and Jim Croce's "Time in a Bottle" as well as two original compositions, written and produced by the singer.

The album received generally favorable reviews, with critics praising Babyface's interpretations, his vocal sincerity, and the album's nostalgic charm, though some found its overall tone overly sentimental or lacking in variety. Playlist reached number 48 on the US Billboard 200 and the top ten on the US Top R&B/Hip-Hop Albums chart, becoming his sixth non-consecutive top ten album to so. The album's lead single, the James Taylor cover "Fire and Rain," became a hit on the US Adult Contemporary chart. In support of the album, Babyface embarked on a 13-city US tour from February to March 2008.

== Background ==
In July 2005, Babyface released his sixth studio album Grown & Sexy on Arista Records. A return to his signature sounds following a shift to uptempo trends on his previous album Face2Face (2001), the album reached number ten on the US Billboard 200 and number three on the Top R&B/Hip-Hop Albums chart, becoming Babyface's highest-charting album since The Day (1996). All of its three singles, including "The Loneliness", "Sorry for the Stupid Things" and "Grown & Sexy," made it to the top ten on the US Adult R&B Songs chart. In August 2005, following L.A. Reid's departure from Arista in January 2004, the label, always an independently managed front line company at BMG, was merged with J Records.

After Grown & Sexy's promotional cycle had come to an end, Babyface signed with the then-newly re-launched Mercury Records, a label under The Island Def Jam Music Group, of which his former songwriting and production partner Reid was serving as chairman and CEO. There, he conceived his first cover album of decidedly non-urban songs, including Eric Clapton's "Wonderful Tonight," James Taylor's "Fire and Rain" and Brad's "Diary." Commenting on his selection process, Babyface told Billboard: "These songs came from memories, and these songs helped shape who I am — and they're still shaping who I am. They shaped my past and now they're shaping my future." The singer also wrote and produced two originals: "The Soldier Song" and "Not Going Nowhere."

== Critical reception ==
Professional ratings
Aggregate scores
Source	Rating
Metacritic	74/100
Review scores
Source	Rating
AllMusic	3.5/5 stars
Entertainment Weekly	B
Los Angeles Times	3.5/4 stars
MusicOMH	2/5 stars
PopMatters	6/10

Playlist earned largely positive review from critics. At Metacritic, which assigns a weighted average rating out of 100 to reviews from mainstream publications, it received an average score of 74 based on six reviews. Ann Powers, writing for Los Angeles Times, found that Playlist was "filled with elegant readings of gems [...] demonstrating just how epic "soft" can be." She concluded: "The songs on Playlist have been incorporated into so many people's personal lives – weddings, anniversaries, funerals, heart-to-heart dates and solitary musings – that no amount of snobbery can refute their power." AllMusic editor Andy Kellman found that Babyface "put a lot of heart and soul into the material, all of which connected with him as a youngster listening to '70s AM radio [...] Apart from Bob Dylan's "Knockin' on Heaven's Door," everything is suited for Babyface, often to the point where the songs don't sound tremendously different from what he has written during the last several years [...] In addition to the eight covers, there are two new songs, both of which fit into the album's scheme sonically while being far from lightweight subject-wise." Mike Joseph from PopMatters called the album a "satisfying trip down memory lane" as well as "Babyface's best work in at least ten years."

Ken Tucker from Entertainment Weekly wrote that "like R&B vocalists from Stevie Wonder to Al Green, Babyface can take bland or treacly material [...] and render it superior to the original with delicate or atypical phrasing plus sheer commitment. Passion, not laid-backness, rules on Playlist, a set of originals and covers. Sometimes Babyface's take is equal to the singer's. Less successful: the fussy arrangements on cringers like Jim Croce's "Time in a Bottle"." Billboard wrote: "As one of R&B's most successful producers, has always been more interested in soft sounds than in hot beats, and on Playlist, [...] he draws a line from his work back to the '70s-era lite-rock hits that first inspired him to croon earnestly about the wonders of love and friendship. Sonic sap threatens everything here, but [Babyface] usually manages to stave off Hallmark ickiness with an ear-tickling detail or two. In a lukewarm review for musicOMH, Shaun Newport remarked: "One of the few things this album might achieve is to expose listeners to the works of these country, folk, soft-rock stars who would have otherwise been overlooked. We can be thankful that it is not another standards album and give some kudos to his covers. It is the cashmere-covered feather-duvet of soft rock albums, just perfect when you need some comfort, a hug and a cup of cocoa but overwhelming at most other times."

== Commercial performance ==
The album opened and peaked at number 48 on the US Billboard 200 and number seven on the Top R&B/Hip-Hop Albums chart. It was Babyface's lowest-charting album since Christmas with Babyface (1998) as well as his sixth non-consecutive top ten album on the R&B/Hip-Hop chart.

== Track listing ==
All track were produced by Babyface.

Playlist track listing
No.	Title	Original artist(s)	Length
1.	"Shower the People"	James Taylor	4:37
2.	"Fire and Rain"	James Taylor	4:59
3.	"Not Going Nowhere"	Babyface	5:24
4.	"Time in a Bottle"	Jim Croce	3:00
5.	"Wonderful Tonight"	Eric Clapton	3:42
6.	"Knockin' on Heaven's Door"	Bob Dylan	3:23
7.	"Longer"	Dan Fogelberg	3:24
8.	"The Soldier Song"	Babyface	4:16
9.	"Please Come to Boston"	Dave Loggins	4:17
10.	"Diary"	David Gates	3:41
Total length:			40:45

== Personnel ==
Credits adapted from the album's liner notes.

Performers and musicians

- Babyface – composer, keyboard, drum programming, acoustic guitar, bass
- Sasha Allen – background vocals
- Brandy – background vocals
- Eric Clapton – composer
- Jim Croce – composer
- Bob Dylan – composer
- Ethan Farmer – bass
- Dan Fogelberg – composer
- Brian Frasier Moore – drums
- David Gates – composer
- Rob Lewis – Fender Rhodes, piano, Wurlitzer
- Doug Livingston – guitar (steel)
- Dave Loggins – composer
- Rafael Padilla – percussion
- Dean Parks – acoustic guitar
- Greg Phillinganes – piano
- Michael Ripoll – acoustic guitar
- Keith Slettedahl – background vocals

Technical

- Babyface – producer
- Paul Boutin – recording and mixing engineer
- James Minchin – photography
- Herb Powers – mastering

== Charts ==
Weekly chart performance for Playlist
Chart (2007)	Peak position
US Billboard 200	48
US Top R&B/Hip-Hop Albums (Billboard)	7
