= Az Yet =

American contemporary R&B group

- Origin: Philadelphia, Pennsylvania, United States
- Genre: R&B
- Years active: 1989–present
- Labels: LaFace, DreamWorks, Az Yet Records
- Members: Kenny Terry; Dyshon Benson; Jibriel Patterson; Jay Naught; Drayton
- Past members: Dion Allen; Shawn Rivera; Marc Nelson; Darryl Anthony; Claude Thomas; Ali Hyman; Tony Grant; Parrice Smith; LeDon Bishop ("Smith"); Kris Gilder; Dante Harper; Damon Core (deceased)

Az Yet is an American R&B group from Philadelphia, best known for their songs "Last Night" and the cover "Hard to Say I'm Sorry" originally performed by Chicago.

== Formation ==
Formed in 1989 initially as a duo with Shawn Rivera and Dion Allen, the two were later joined by Kenny Terry, whom they met singing in the lobby of the Wyndham Hotel in Philadelphia, Claude Thomas, Damon Core, & Dyshon Benson.

== Debut album ==
Az Yet released their self-titled debut album in 1996 on LaFace Records. The album featured a "who's who" of musical heavyweights, including David Foster, Babyface, Sheila E., and Brian McKnight. The first single, "Last Night", reached No. 9 on the US Hot 100, #1 on the R&B chart, peaked at No. 2 on Australia's ARIA charts, and spent 2 weeks at No. 1 in New Zealand's RIANZ charts, ultimately achieving platinum status in the US. The group's second single, "Hard to Say I'm Sorry" (a cover of the Chicago hit featuring Peter Cetera), was nominated for a Grammy award (Best R&B Performance by a Duo or Group with Vocals), reached No. 8 on the Hot 100, and achieved platinum status. Driven by these two singles, the album reached RIAA platinum status.

== Members ==
=== Current ===
- Kenny Terry (1991–present)
- Dyshon Benson (1992–1995; 2016–2019; 2023-present)
- Jibriel Patterson (2023–present)
- Jay Naught (2023–present)
- Drayton (2023–present)

=== Former ===
- Dion Allen (1989–2023) aka Kagiso Mucanze
- Shawn Rivera (1989–2015)
- Marc Nelson (1995–1997; 2007–2010; 2015–2016; 2023)
- Darryl Anthony (1994–2007)
- Claude Thomas (1990–1994; 2014–2023)
- Tony Grant (1997–1999; 2010–2011)
- LeDon Smith (1999–2007)
- Parrice Smith (2016–2022)
- Kris Gilder (2004–2007)
- Dante Harper (2004–2007)
- Damon Core (deceased) (1990–1992)

== Television ==
Fueled by two top ten hits, the group's popularity led them to several television appearances in their early years. Live performances include The Keenen Ivory Wayans Show, All That and two appearances on Soul Train (the first in 1996 with Marc Nelson as the lead singer and the second in 1997 with Tony Grant). The group was also cast as "TJ's Band" and appeared in several episodes of the short-lived television drama Fame L.A.

Az Yet toured as featured actors/performers in 2013 with the Broadway musical, My Brother Marvin (The Secret Life of Marvin Gaye), starring Keith Washington, Tony Grant and actress Lynn Whitfield.

Later that year, the group recorded "Magical Moment" with Malaysian Idol winner Jaclyn Victor as a theme song for the animated feature film, Ribbit (KRU Studios).

== Discography ==
=== Studio albums ===
- Az Yet (1996)
- Back Home 2007 (2006)
- She's Magic (2016)

=== Extended plays ===
- That B U (2004)

=== Singles ===
Year	Title	Album	Label	Released	Hot 100
1996	"Last Night"	Az Yet	LaFace Records	August 12, 1996	9
1997	"Hard to Say I'm Sorry"	Az Yet	LaFace Records	February 2, 1997	8
1997	"You're the Inspiration" (Peter Cetera featuring Az Yet)	You're the Inspiration	Platinum Entertainment	August 26, 1997	77
2007	"Keep on Pushin'"	Back Home	InnerSoul Records	May 5, 2007	
2008	"Share Life"	Single only	Az Yet Records	October 30, 2008	
2008	"She Loves the 90s"	Single only	Az Yet Records	November 12, 2008	
2009	"I Can't Let U Go"	Untitled	Az Yet Records	January 2009	
2011	"Ms. Behaving"	Single only	Az Yet Records	February 2011	
2012	"Star Spangled Banner"	Single only	Az Yet Records	July 2012	
2013	"All It Takes"	Single only	Az Yet Records	January 2013	
2013	"Magical Moment"	Ikut Rentakku	KRU Music	June 26, 2013	

=== Soundtrack appearances ===
- 1996: The Nutty Professor
- 1997: Steel (Warner Bros. Records)
- 1998: Hav Plenty (Polygram)
- 1998: Fame L.A. Soundtrack for the TV Series (Polygram)
- 2001: Kingdom Come (GospoCentric Records)
- 2014: Ribbit (KRU Studios)
