= Two Occasions =

Single by the Deele

from the album Eyes of a Stranger
- Released: December 23, 1987
- Recorded: 1987
- Genre: R&B
- Length: 4:17
- Label: Solar
- Songwriters: Kenneth "Babyface" Edmonds, Darnell "Dee" Bristol, Sid Johnson
- Producers: L.A. Reid, Babyface

The Deele singles chronology
"Can-U-Dance" (1987)	"Two Occasions" (1987)	"Shoot Em Up Movies" (1988)

Music video
- "Two Occasions" on YouTube

"Two Occasions" is an R&B song written by Babyface, Darnell Bristol, and Sid Johnson (who was the former manager for Babyface's early group, Manchild). It was produced by Babyface and L.A. Reid for the Deele's third studio album Eyes of a Stranger (1987). The ballad was released as the album's second single in December 1987. It is the only song on the album that features Babyface on lead vocals, which alternate between him, Bristol, and Carlos "Satin" Greene throughout the course of the song. It has since been remade into a live version with added vocals from Babyface with all original vocals from the Deele intact; this version appeared on the 12-inch maxi single and also three years later on his album, A Closer Look.

== Reception ==
Craig Lytle, in his review of the album for AllMusic, called "Two Occasions" a "quiet-storm classic" with "superb arrangement and production", declaring the song "worthy of a number-one ranking." In 1989, the song won a BMI Pop Award.

Although the band's first hit "Body Talk" actually had a higher placement on the R&B chart, "Two Occasions" is widely considered The Deele's most successful single. It peaked at number 10 on the US Billboard Hot 100, number four on the Hot Black Singles chart and number 21 on the Adult Contemporary chart.

== Charts ==
Chart (1988)	Peak position
US Billboard Hot 100	10
US Hot Black Singles (Billboard)	4
US Adult Contemporary (Billboard)	21

== Legacy ==
Mariah Carey referred to the song and Babyface in her 2005 hit song, "We Belong Together", and sampled it in the remix.

It was also sampled in the song "I Still Love You" by Next.
