= Material Thangz =

Studio album by The Deele
- Released: June 4, 1985
- Recorded: 1984−1985 at Bison Recording Studios (Columbus, Ohio)
- Genre: R&B, funk
- Label: SOLAR, Elektra/Asylum, Warner Bros.
- Producer: L.A. Reid

The Deele chronology
Street Beat (1983)	Material Thangz (1985)	Eyes of a Stranger (1987)

Professional ratings
Review scores
Source	Rating
Allmusic	link

Material Thangz is the second album by The Deele. Released on June 4, 1985 on the SOLAR Records label, which was distributed by Elektra/Asylum Records, a division of Warner Bros. Records. It was produced by L.A. Reid. It's notable for the composition "Sweet November", composed by then-member Kenneth "Babyface" Edmonds, who also sung lead vocals on the composition. The song was later covered by R&B group Troop, who turned the song into a #1 R&B hit in 1992.

== Track listing ==
1. "Let's Work Tonight" (Edmonds)
2. "Stimulate" (Bristol, Edmonds, Reid, Roberson)
3. "You're All I've Ever Known" (Edmonds)
4. "Suspicious" (Edmonds, Greene, Reid, Roberson)
5. "Material Thangz" (Edmonds, Greene, Reid, Roberson, Simmons)
6. "I'll Send You Roses" (Edmonds, Oates)
7. "Sweet November" (Edmonds)
8. "Sweet Nothingz" (Bristol, Roberson)

== Personnel ==
- Babyface - Vocals, Guitar, Keyboards
- Carlos - Vocals, Vocals (Background)
- Dee - Percussion, Vocals
- Karen Flowers - Vocals (Background)
- Sonya Flowers - Vocals (Background)
- Victoria Forman - Vocals (Background)
- Reggie Griffin - Guitar
- Debra Hurd - Vocals
- Kayo - Guitar (Bass), Percussion, Synthesizer, Vocals
- L.A. Reid - Drums, Percussion, Programming
- Daryl Simmons - Percussion, Vocals (Background)
- Demorris Smith - Synthesizer
