= "Bassy" Bob Brockmann =

Bob Brockmann
- Born: January 1, 1962 (age 63); New Orleans, Louisiana, U.S.
- Occupations: Music composer, musician, producer
- Instruments: Trumpet, bass

"Bassy" Bob Brockmann is an American record producer, recording and mixing engineer. He has collaborated on recordings with The Fugees, Notorious BIG, Craig Mack, Toni Braxton, Babyface, Cee Lo Green, Soulive, Surface, Brian McKnight, Christina Aguilera, Brandy, Mary J Blige, Faith Hill, Bob Dylan, Sheryl Crow and the Dixie Chicks.

Brockmann attended the University of Miami for music and played trumpet in The Brooklyn Funk Essentials. From 1998 to 2007, Brockmann owned NuMedia Studios on lower Broadway in New York City.

== Awards and honors ==
Brockmann has been nominated for more than 30 Grammy Awards, and has won twice: for Christina Aguilera's 2000 album Mi Reflejo and for Kirk Franklin's 1999 album The Nu Nation Project. His mix of "There You'll Be" from the film Pearl Harbor was nominated for a 2001 "Best Song" Oscar.
