= The Deele =

American band from Cincinnati, Ohio

- Origin: Cincinnati, Ohio, United States
- Genres: Post-disco, R&B
- Years active: 1981–1993, 2007–present
- Label: Solar
- Members: Darnell "Dee" Bristol; Kevin "Kayo" Roberson; Carlos "Satin" Greene; Stanley "Stick" Burke; Leon Qui
- Past members: Kenneth "Babyface" Edmonds; Antonio "L.A." Reid; Steve "Tuck" Walters

The Deele (pronounced like "deal") is an American band from Cincinnati, Ohio that achieved success in the 1980s with such hit singles as "Body Talk" and "Two Occasions". When the group began recording in the early 1980s, the lineup consisted of Indianapolis native Kenny "Babyface" Edmonds along with Cincinnati musicians Antonio "L.A." Reid, Carlos "Satin" Greene, Darnell "Dee" Bristol, Stanley "Stick" Burke, and Kevin "Kayo" Roberson. In 2007, Bristol, Greene, Roberson, and Burke reformed the group with several new members.

A March 2016 BET Honors performance, featuring Babyface and Reid reuniting with their former bandmates on stage, led to a more permanent reunion of the classic Deele lineup that has continued to the present.

== Biography ==
The Deele was formed in 1981 and originally comprised local Cincinnati musicians drummer Antonio "L.A." Reid, bassist Kevin "Kayo" Roberson, vocalist/percussionist Darnell "Dee" Bristol, lead vocalist Carlos "Satin" Greene, guitarist/keyboardist Stanley "Stick" Burke, and guitarist Steve "Tuck" Walters. Reid, Roberson, and Walters had been members of a previous Cincinnati-based band, Pure Essence. Kenneth "Babyface" Edmonds, hailing from Indianapolis, would join later in 1981, and Walters left the band before they began recording their debut album, Street Beat.

The group would record three albums during the 1980s, scoring several hit singles. Street Beat was released in 1983, and the following year, a single from this album, "Body Talk," became The Deele's first hit, reaching #3 on the R&B chart and #77 on the Billboard Hot 100 pop chart. Burke left the band prior to the recording of a follow-up album. Recorded as a quintet, Material Thangz was released in 1985. It was not as successful as their debut album.

Following a brief hiatus, during which Babyface recorded his debut solo album, Lovers, the band regrouped to record. They reached the apex of their career in 1987 with the release of their third album, Eyes of a Stranger, which produced two top-10 R&B singles: "Shoot 'Em Up Movies" and perhaps their best-known song, "Two Occasions." The latter track reached #4 on the R&B charts and cracked the top 10 of the Billboard Hot 100. Music videos were made for both songs. The video for the "Shoot 'Em Up Movies" track was directed by Martin Pitts and produced by Mickey Shapiro. It was during this time that L.A. Reid and Babyface Edmonds began crafting their talents as songwriters for other artists. They wrote and produced "Girlfriend" (which featured backing vocals from Deele members and became a top ten hit) for Reid's girlfriend, and eventual wife Pebbles. During this period, they also wrote and produced The Whispers' "Rock Steady".

In 1988, encouraged by their songwriting success with other artists, both Babyface and Reid left The Deele and founded LaFace Records in 1989. At the beginning of the 1990s, Reid and Edmonds would become successful record producers. Although not as recognized as Reid and Edmonds, another Deele member, Kevin "Kayo" Roberson maintained his association with the two, and was an instrumental part of the production team's success behind the scenes as a songwriter, co-producer, and studio bassist. Babyface would also embark on a very successful run as a solo artist.

In 1993, Greene and Bristol reunited again as The Deele (without Reid, Edmonds, or Roberson) to record the album, An Invitation to Love. This album found the group adopting a more new jack swing-based sound and incorporating rap into many of their songs. Failing to make a dent in the charts, the group broke up later that same year.

=== Reunion ===
In March 2016, all members of the classic Deele lineup, including Babyface and L.A. Reid, reunited to perform at a BET Honors event where Reid was recognized. This performance led to a more permanent reformation in the summer and plans to tour and record.

== In popular culture ==
Their hit song "Two Occasions" has been referred to in several other songs, including by Mariah Carey in her 2005 Billboard Hot 100 #1 hit “We Belong Together,” by rapper The Game in the song "One Night" in 2006, and by Plies in his 2009 hit song, "Want It, Need It" featuring Ashanti. MF Doom sampled the track "Shoot 'Em Up Movies", off of their 1987 album Eyes of a Stranger, in his 1999 song "Red & Gold", which was featured on his 1999 album Operation: Doomsday.

== Original members ==
- Darnell "Dee" Bristol: vocals
- Stanley "Stick" Burke: guitar, keyboards (left after the first album)
- Kenny "Babyface" Edmonds: keyboards, guitar, vocals
- Carlos "Satin" Greene: vocals
- Antonio "L.A." Reid: drums
- Kevin "Kayo" Roberson: bass
- Steve "Tuck" Walters: guitar, vocals (left before first album, 1982)

== Discography ==
=== Studio albums ===
Year	Album	Label	Peak chart positions	
Year	Album	Label	US	US R&B
1983	Street Beat	Solar Records	78	9
1985	Material Thangz	Solar Records	155	29
1987	Eyes of a Stranger	Solar Records	54	5
1993	An Invitation to Love	Solar Records	—	—
"—" denotes releases that did not chart.

=== Singles ===
Year	Single	Peak chart positions		
Year	Single	US R&B	US Adult	US Pop
1983	"Video Villain"	―	—	—
1983	"I Surrender"	66	―	—
1983	"Just My Luck"	25	―	―
1983	"Body Talk"	3	—	77
1985	"Sweet Nothingz"	―	―	―
1985	"Suspicious"	66	―	—
1985	"Material Thangz"	14	—	—
1987	"Can U-Dance"	48	—	—
1987	"Two Occasions"	4	21	10
1988	"Shoot 'Em Up Movies"	10	―	―
1993	"Imagination"	―	―	—
2007	"The Only 1"	―	―	—
2007	"All I Want for Christmas"	—	―	―
"—" denotes releases that did not chart.

=== Compilation albums ===
- Deep Cover (movie soundtrack) (1992)
- Greatest Hits (1994)
- The Best of the Deele (1996)
- Shoot 'Em Up (The Best of the Deele) (2002)
