= Darnell Bristol =

American songwriter

Darnell "Dee" Bristol is a member of The Deele and a songwriter who co-wrote The Deele's "Two Occasions". Years later, he was credited as co-writer of Mariah Carey's "We Belong Together", in which Carey reused portions of "Two Occasions".

Bristol is currently performing in a reformed Deele that includes three other original bandmembers, Carlos "Satin" Greene, Kevin "Kayo" Roberson, and Stanley "Stick" Burke.

== Personal life ==
Bristol has six children.
