= Grown & Sexy =

Studio album by Babyface
- Released: July 26, 2005
- Length: 55:10
- Label: Arista
- Producers: Babyface; Gregg Pagani; The Underdogs

Babyface chronology
The Other Side of Cool (2005)	Grown & Sexy (2005)	Playlist (2007)

Singles from Grown & Sexy
- 1. "The Loneliness" Released: 2004; 2. "Sorry for the Stupid Things" Released: 2005; 3. "Grown & Sexy" Released: 2005

Grown & Sexy is the sixth studio album by American singer Babyface. It was released by Arista Records on July 26, 2005 in the United States. Originally titled A Love Story and due to be released on March 23, 2004, its release was shelved after lead single "The Loneliness" failed to attract radio airplay/sales. The album was later reworked into Grown & Sexy with three songs ("The Loneliness", "God Must Love U", "The Getting 2 Know U") being taken from the A Love Story sessions.

The album received largely mixed to negative reviews from music critics, who were deeply divided over his decision to return to his earlier sound and dismissed much of the material as generic. Commercially, it reached number ten on the US Billboard 200 and number 3 on the R&B/Hip-Hop Albums, becoming Babyface's highest-charting album since The Day (1996). "Sorry for the Stupid Things" and "Grown & Sexy," two further singles from the album, both entered the top ten on the Adult R&B Songs chart.

== Background ==
In 2001, Babyface released his fifth studio album Face2Face. Released five years after The Day (1996), it album marked his debut under the Arista label. The album also reunited him with L.A. Reid, his former songwriting and production partner, who was serving as Arista’s president at the time. Face2Face marked a significant departure from Babyface’s earlier work, not only shifting from his signature ballads to a more uptempo sound, but also featuring collaborations with outside producers on nearly half the album— a rare move for the artist. Despite a top 10 R&B hit with The Neptunes-produced "There She Goes," the album has sold less than 500,000 units, much less than his previous efforts.

Originally titled A Love Story, Babyface's next project with Arista was expected to be a return to his siganture sound. Due to be released on March 23, 2004, it was shelved however, after its lead single "The Loneliness" failed to attract radio airplay. With BMG CEO Clive Davis asking him to "do something with a youthful, fun edge to it," Babyface decided to rework parts of the A Love Story sessions into Grown & Sexy, which he described as "classic Babyface songs tweaked with some of today’s production values so it can keep the same fans and still grab a new audience." Writing again with longtime collaborator Daryl Simmons, Babyface produced most of the album with Greg Fregani. Commenting on the album's title, he told Billboard: "It means being comfortable with who you are, where you are in your life. That confidence is what makes you sexy. But there's still a certain amount of youth quality to the record."

== Critical reception ==
Professional ratings
Aggregate scores
Source	Rating
Metacritic	51/100
Review scores
Source	Rating
AllMusic	3.5/5 stars
The Guardian	2/5 stars
Los Angeles Times	2/5 stars
Rolling Stone	2/5 stars
Slant Magazine	2/5 stars
Vibe	0.5/5 marks

Grown & Sexy was met with "mixed or average" reviews from critics. At Metacritic, which assigns a weighted average rating out of 100 to reviews from mainstream publications, this release received an average score of 51 based on 9 reviews. Billboard wrote: "Dipping back into his familiar love and relationship zone, Babyface orchestrates a pleasing collection of midtempo songs and ballads brushed with, but not obscured by, a contemporary sheen." AllMusic editor Andy Kellman called Grown & Sexy "a back-to-basics album that sounds a lot more natural [...] While this is very familiar territory, few cover it as well [...] Grown & Sexy doesn't have any songs that immediately jump out and fall in line with the biggest hits, but it does make up for that with its consistency." Jon Pareles, writing for The New York Times remarked that "by the end of the album, the guitar is back and Babyface has returned to his old territory: smooth, sincere and saccharine. Like a lot of current pop, he could use a middle ground between thuggishness and sentimentality."

Natalie Nichols, Los Angeles Times critic Natalie Nichols felt that Babyface's "smooth tenor is still up to the task, but the bland sentiments, occasionally wince-inducing lyrical cliches and nearly unrelenting midtempo pace make for a mighty monotonous 52 minutes." Betty Clarke from The Guardian wrote: "After his attempt to update his style with the falsetto funk of 2001's Face2Face album met with failure, Edmonds is now dragging us back over old ground for an hour of boredom. The sighs are resigned, the songs ultra-smooth and utterly soulless [...] For a man once so culturally important they named a stretch of Interstate 65 after him, this is a road to hell." Vibe editor Angie Romero found that the album "fails to innovate." She noted that "it's certainly easy to appreciate the crooner's maturity and supple voice [...] With every little evolution, and the sexy part left back somewhere in the '90s, Grown feels more like an extended elevator ride than an adult movement." Rolling Stone magazine wrote: "Dragged down by radio-courting melodies and ready-made rhymes, this album's first half is particularly calculated."

== Commercial performance ==
Grown & Sexy debuted and peaked at number ten on the US Billboard 200 and number three on the Top R&B/Hip-Hop Albums chart, with first week sales of 56,000 copies. It was Babyface's highest-charting album since The Day (1996). Billboard ranked the album 97th on its 2005 Top R&B/Hip-Hop Albums year-end chart. By August 2007, Grown & Sexy had sold 287,000 copies in the United States, according to Nielsen SoundScan.

== Track listing ==
Grown & Sexy track listing
No.	Title	Writer(s)	Producer(s)	Length
1.	"Tonight It's Goin' Down"	Kenneth Edmonds; Daryl Simmons	Babyface; Gregg Pagani	4:37
2.	"Grown & Sexy"	Edmonds; Simmons	Babyface; Pagani	4:03
3.	"Mad, Sexy, Cool"	Edmonds	Babyface; Pagani	3:58
4.	"Can't Stop Now"	Edmonds; Harvey Mason, Jr.; Damon Thomas	The Underdogs	4:11
5.	"Goin' Outta Business"	Edmonds; Simmons	Babyface; Pagani	3:47
6.	"Drama, Love & 'Lationships"	Edmonds	Babyface; Pagani	3:56
7.	"Sorry for the Stupid Things"	Edmonds	Babyface; Pagani	4:13
8.	"Good to Be in Love"	Clarence Allen; Edmonds; Pagani; Simmons	Babyface; Pagani	3:25
9.	"The Loneliness"	Edmonds	The Underdogs	4:36
10.	"She"	Edmonds	Babyface; Pagani	3:40
11.	"God Must Love U"	Edmonds	Babyface; Pagani	4:48
12.	"The Gettin' to Know U"	Edmonds	Babyface; Pagani	3:54
13.	"She's International"	Allen; Edmonds; Pagani; Simmons	Babyface; Pagani	3:32
Total length:				55:10

Japan bonus track
No.	Title	Writer(s)	Producer(s)	Length
14.	"Red Dresses"	Edmonds	Babyface; Pagani	4:16

== Charts ==
=== Weekly charts ===
Weekly chart performance for Grown & Sexy
Chart (2005)	Peak position
Japanese Albums (Oricon)	18
US Billboard 200	10
US Top R&B/Hip-Hop Albums (Billboard)	3

=== Year-end charts ===
Year-end chart performance for Grown & Sexy
Chart (2005)	Position
US Top R&B/Hip-Hop Albums (Billboard)	97
