= Babyface (musician) =

American singer, songwriter, and record producer (born 1959)

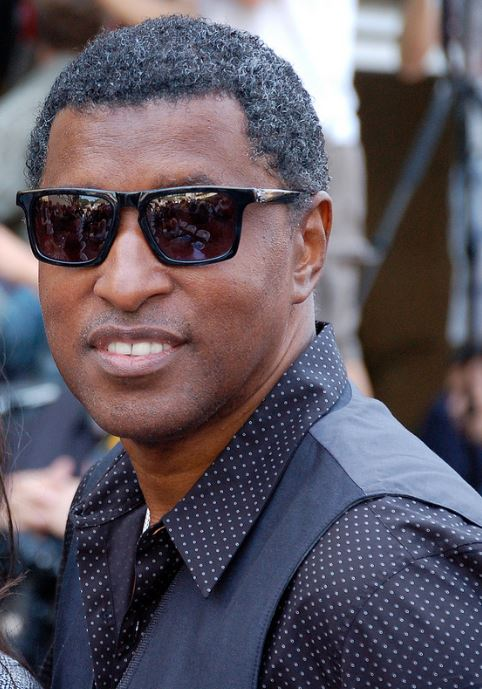
- Babyface in 2013
- Born: Kenneth Brian Edmonds; April 10, 1959 (age 67); Indianapolis, Indiana, U.S.
- Other names: Face; Y Corp
- Occupations: Singer; songwriter; record producer; record executive
- Years active: 1974–present
- Television: College Hill; Soul Food
- Spouses: Tracey Edmonds (m. 1992; div. 2005) Nicole Pantenburg (m. 2014; div. 2021)
- Children: 3
- Relatives: Kevon Edmonds (brother); Melvin Edmonds (brother)
- Musical career
- Genres: R&B; soul; new jack swing
- Instruments: Vocals; guitar; keyboards; bass
- Labels: Chi Sound; LaFace; SOLAR; Epic; Arista; Mercury; Motown; Def Jam; Capitol; Soda Pop
- Formerly of: The Deele; Milestone; Manchild
- Website: babyfacemusic.com

Kenneth Brian Edmonds (born April 10, 1959), better known by his stage name Babyface, is an American singer, songwriter, and record producer. He has written and produced 26 number-one R&B hit songs and won 13 Grammy Awards. He was ranked number 20 on NME's 50 of The Greatest Producers Ever list.

== Early life ==
Edmonds was born on April 10, 1959, in Indianapolis, Indiana, to Marvin Dallas and Barbara Jean (née O'Bannon) Edmonds. Barbara was a production operator at a pharmaceutical plant. Edmonds, who is the fifth of six brothers (including future After 7 band members Melvin and Kevon Edmonds, the latter of whom went on to have a modestly successful solo career), attended North Central High School in Indianapolis, and as a shy youth, wrote songs to express his emotions. When he was in eighth grade, Edmonds' father died of lung cancer, leaving his mother to raise her sons alone.

== Music career ==
Edmonds later met funk performer Bootsy Collins, who tagged him "Babyface" because of his youthful look. He also performed in the group Manchild (which had a 1977 hit "Especially for You" with band member Daryl Simmons) as a guitarist. He played keyboards and guitar in the light-funk and R&B group the Deele (which also included drummer Antonio "L.A." Reid, with whom he would later form a successful writing and producing partnership). One of his first major credits as a songwriter for outside artists came when he wrote the tune "Slow Jam" for the R&B band Midnight Star in 1983. The tune was on Midnight Star's 1983 double-platinum No Parking on the Dance Floor album. Babyface remained in the Deele until 1988, when both he and Reid left the group.

His album Playlist consists of eight cover songs and two original works. It was released on September 18, 2007. It was the first album on the newly re-launched Mercury Records label.

On February 4, 2014, he released a Grammy Award-winning duet album with Toni Braxton titled Love, Marriage & Divorce on Motown Records.

In April 2024, he announced a Las Vegas residency via an Instagram video, featuring a playful spoof of Kidman's viral AMC Theaters ad.

== Other ventures ==
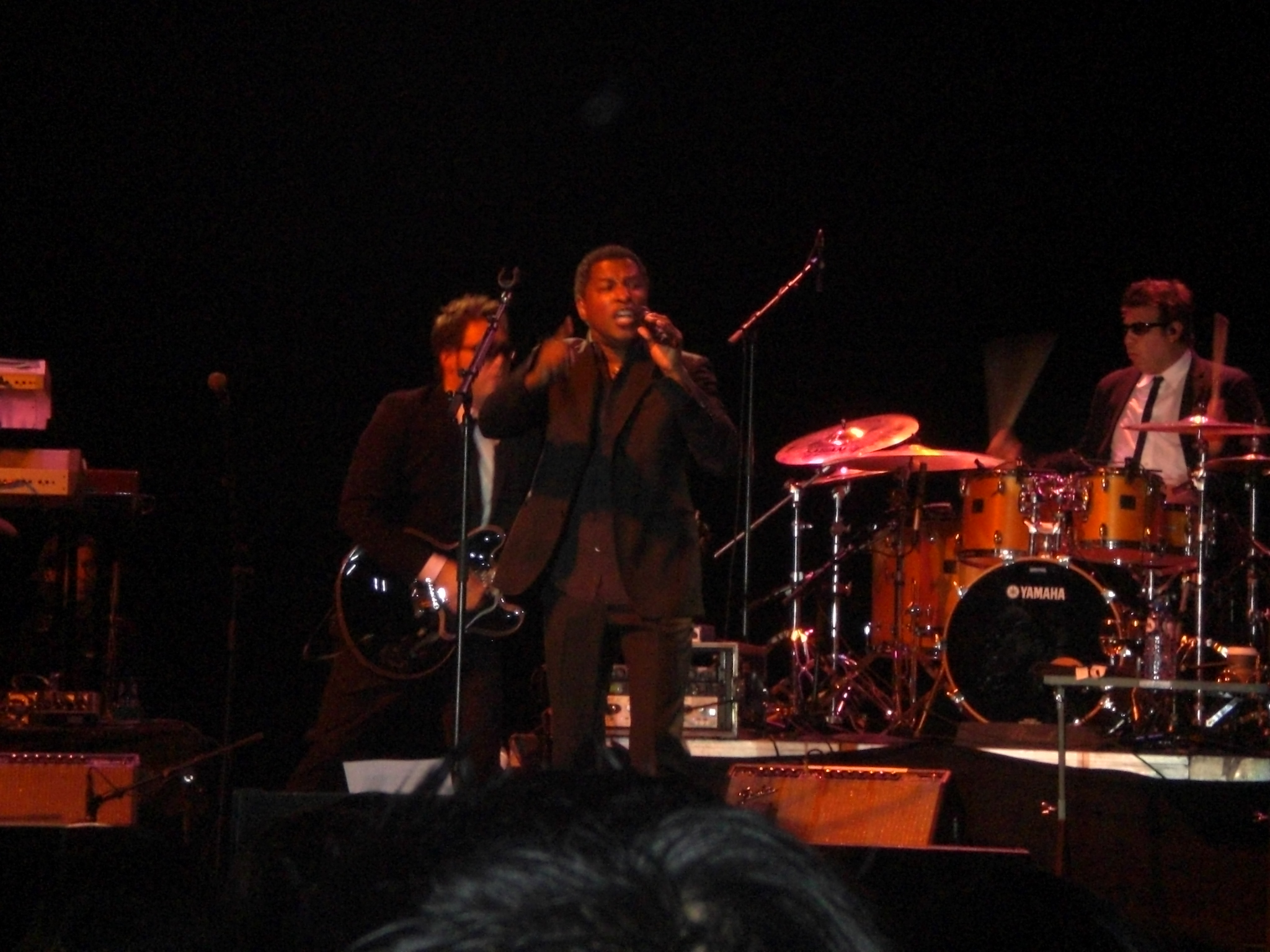
Edmonds performing in 2009

=== Writing and producing ===
From the late 1980s to the early 90s, he wrote R&B and dance songs, writing and producing music for Bobby Brown ("Roni"), Karyn White ("Love Saw It"), Pebbles ("Girlfriend"), The Whispers ("Rock Steady", "In the Mood"), The Deele ("Two Occasions"), Johnny Gill ("My My My"), After 7 ("Ready or Not"), The Boys ("Dial My Heart"), Damian Dame ("Right Down to It") and Sheena Easton ("The Lover In Me").

In 1989, Edmonds co-founded LaFace Records with Reid. Three of the label's early artists, TLC, Usher, and Toni Braxton, were very successful. TLC's second album CrazySexyCool, for which he wrote and produced some of the hits, became the best-selling album of all time by an American girl group. Under his direction, TLC sold more than 60 million albums worldwide, and a combined total of 75 million records. Toni Braxton's first two albums, Toni Braxton (1993) and Secrets (1996), for which he wrote the majority of the songs, went on to sell a combined total of over 15 million copies.

Babyface helped form the late-1990s R&B group Az Yet. Edmonds also helped to mold and work with some of his then-wife Tracey Edmonds' acts, such as Jon B and producer Jon-John Robinson.

"I'm Your Baby Tonight" (1990), produced for Whitney Houston, was Edmonds' first No. 1 Top 40 hit in the US. He also wrote and produced Boyz II Men's 1992 "End of the Road" and 1994 "I'll Make Love to You", both of which established records for the longest stay at No. 1 on the Billboard Hot 100 chart. He co-wrote, co-produced, and provided backing vocals on Madonna's 1994 Bedtime Stories, which featured the seven-week No. 1 hit "Take a Bow", and shared billing with Eric Clapton on the chart-topping Grammy winner "Change the World" from the Phenomenon soundtrack. He also wrote and produced the No. 1 hit "Exhale (Shoop Shoop)" for Houston as well as the rest of the 10 million-selling Waiting to Exhale soundtrack in 1995, which spawned additional hits for Houston, Brandy and Mary J. Blige.

Edmonds has produced and written music for Bobby Brown, The Whispers, Pebbles, After 7, Johnny Gill, Deele, Karyn White, The Boys, Damian Dame, Tevin Campbell, Patti LaBelle, Chaka Khan, Aretha Franklin, Madonna, Janet Jackson, Faith Evans, Beyoncé, Diana Ross, Sheena Easton, Toni Braxton, Michael Jackson, Michael Bolton, Paula Abdul, Eric Clapton ("Change the World"), Whitney Houston, Brandy, Mary J. Blige, Tamia, Shola Ama, 3T, Sisqó, Dru Hill, Fall Out Boy, Céline Dion, Samantha Jade, Backstreet Boys, Honeyz, Katharine McPhee, Mariah Carey, Vanessa L. Williams, Bruno Mars, Kelly Clarkson, Chanté Moore, En Vogue, Zendaya, Kenny G, Kristinia DeBarge, Lil Wayne, Kevin Abstract, P!nk, Marc Nelson, TLC, Ariana Grande, Jessica Mauboy, Xscape, K-Ci & JoJo, NSYNC, Jordin Sparks and Phil Collins. He received three consecutive Grammy Awards for Producer of the Year from 1995 to 1997.

Babyface worked on Ashanti's album The Declaration (2008), producing the track "Mother".

He worked on the Lil Wayne album Tha Carter III (2008), on the Kanye West-produced "Comfortable". He also worked with R&B singer Monica for her sixth studio album Still Standing (2010).

In 2013, Babyface served as producer for Ariana Grande's debut album Yours Truly, producing five of the songs, including her second single, "Baby I".

In September 2014, Babyface collaborated with Barbra Streisand on her album Partners, performing a duet on the track "Evergreen" and background vocals for other album tracks.

Babyface also collaborated with Foxes on her second album, All I Need (2016), producing and co-writing "Scar".

In July 2016, Babyface along with Bruce Roberts and Carole Bayer Sager helped write the song "Stronger Together" sung by Jessica Sanchez. The song was played after Hillary Clinton's speech at the 2016 Democratic National Convention. The song's title is named after the slogan that the Clinton campaign used as a show of uniting behind the Democratic nominee. The song was one of the top trending songs on Shazam that week. The song was widely perceived as positive by the listeners, and received praise by celebrities like Jennifer Lopez and Kim Kardashian.

=== Acting ===
In 1994, he appeared and performed on an episode of Beverly Hills, 90210, entitled "Mr. Walsh Goes to Washington (Part 2)".

In the mid-1990s, Edmonds and his then-wife Tracey Edmonds expanded into the business of motion pictures. Upon setting up Edmonds Entertainment Group, the company produced the films Soul Food (1997), Josie and the Pussycats (2001), and also the soundtrack for the film The Prince of Egypt (1998), which included contributions from numerous artists, including Mariah Carey and Whitney Houston. They also executive produced the BET reality series College Hill (2004–2009). Edmonds also worked with David Foster to compose "The Power of the Dream", the official song of the 1996 Summer Olympics, performed by Céline Dion. Linda Thompson provided the lyrics.

Babyface also participated as a duet partner on the Fox reality show Celebrity Duets (2006).

He was portrayed by Wesley Jonathan in the 2015 Lifetime biopic Whitney and is portrayed by actor Gavin Houston in the Lifetime biopic based on Toni Braxton entitled Un-Break My Heart, which premiered on the network in early 2016.

In 2016, Babyface competed on season 23 of Dancing with the Stars. He was partnered with professional dancer Allison Holker. He and Holker were eliminated on the fourth week of competition and finished in 11th place along with Vanilla Ice and Witney Carson.

=== Soda Pop Records ===
Edmonds founded his record label Soda Pop Records in 2009. He has signed the R&B duo K-Ci & JoJo, who released their fifth album, My Brother's Keeper (2013), as the label's first project. In 2013, Babyface secured a distribution deal with E1 Music for the label.

== Personal life ==
In 2007, Babyface began dating his backup dancer Nicole "Nikki" Pantenburg (former backup dancer for and personal friend of Janet Jackson). Babyface and Pantenburg have a daughter born in 2008. The pair married on May 17, 2014. In July 2021, they announced that their marriage would be ending after seven years.

== Influence ==
In 1999, a 25-mile (40 km) stretch of Interstate 65 that runs through Indianapolis was renamed the Kenneth "Babyface" Edmonds Highway.

Babyface was placed at number 20 on NME's "50 of the Greatest Producers Ever" list. NME wrote of his influence:

One of the founding fathers of all the best bits of modern US R&B. And so you can't hate him if some of the schlock can be traced back to him also. Babyface was a pioneer of New Jack Swing in the 80s, before setting up LaFace with old mucker Antonio 'LA' Reid to give the world TLC, Usher and Toni Braxton under their guiding hand. There's barely a prominent artist in the genre he hasn't worked with, and as a result he's clocked up a mammoth 26 R&B number ones.

== Discography ==
=== Studio albums ===
- Lovers (1986)
- Tender Lover (1989)
- For the Cool in You (1993)
- The Day (1996)
- Face2Face (2001)
- Grown & Sexy (2005)
- Playlist (2007)
- Return of the Tender Lover (2015)
- Girls Night Out (2022)

=== Collaboration albums ===
- Power and Love with Manchild (1977)
- Feel the Phuff with Manchild (1978)
- Street Beat with The Deele (1983)
- Material Thangz with The Deele (1985)
- Eyes of a Stranger with The Deele (1987)
- Love, Marriage & Divorce with Toni Braxton (2014)

== Accolades ==
In 1999, Babyface received the Golden Plate Award of the American Academy of Achievement presented by Awards Council member Coretta Scott King at a ceremony in Washington, D.C.

On August 30, 2006, Babyface was honored as a BMI Icon at the 6th annual BMI Urban Awards. Throughout his career, Babyface has won the BMI Pop Songwriter of the Year trophy 7 times, and a total of 51 BMI Awards, which includes Song of the Year for his Toni Braxton hit, "Breathe Again", in 1994.

Babyface was honored with the 2,508th star of the Hollywood Walk of Fame on October 10, 2013. The star is located at 6270 Hollywood Boulevard.

On October 18, 2018, he was conferred with an honorary doctorate degree from Indiana University Bloomington in recognition of his illustrious career in music.

=== Grammy Awards ===
| Year | Nominated work | Category | Result |
|---|---|---|---|
| 1989 | — | Producer of the Year (Non-Classical) | Nominated |
| 1989 | "Don't Be Cruel" | Best R&B Song | Nominated |
| 1990 | "Every Little Step" | Best R&B Song | Nominated |
| 1990 | "Superwoman" | Best R&B Song | Nominated |
| 1990 | "It's No Crime" | Best R&B Instrumental Performance | Nominated |
| 1990 | — | Producer of the Year (Non-Classical) | Nominated |
| 1991 | "Whip Appeal" | Best R&B Vocal Performance, Male | Nominated |
| 1991 | "My, My, My" | Best R&B Song | Nominated |
| 1993 | "End of the Road" | Best R&B Song | Won |
| 1993 | — | Producer of the Year (Non-Classical) | Won |
| 1994 | The Bodyguard: Original Soundtrack Album (as a Producer) | Album of the Year | Won |
| 1994 | "For the Cool in You" | Best R&B Vocal Performance, Male | Nominated |
| 1994 | "Can We Talk" | Best R&B Song | Nominated |
| 1995 | "When Can I See You" | Best Male R&B Vocal Performance | Won |
| 1995 | "When Can I See You" | Best R&B Song | Nominated |
| 1995 | "You Mean the World to Me" | Best R&B Song | Nominated |
| 1995 | "I'll Make Love to You" | Best R&B Song | Won |
| 1995 | "I'll Make Love to You" | Record of the Year | Nominated |
| 1996 | — | Producer of the Year | Won |
| 1996 | "Someone to Love" (with Jon B.) | Best Pop Collaboration with Vocals | Nominated |
| 1996 | "Someone to Love" | Best Song Written Specifically for a Motion Picture or for Television | Nominated |
| 1996 | "Red Light Special" | Best R&B Song | Nominated |
| 1996 | "You Can't Run" | Best R&B Song | Nominated |
| 1997 | "Sittin' up in My Room" | Best R&B Song | Nominated |
| 1997 | "You're Makin' Me High" | Best R&B Song | Nominated |
| 1997 | "Exhale (Shoop Shoop)" | Best R&B Song | Won |
| 1997 | "Exhale (Shoop Shoop)" | Song of the Year | Nominated |
| 1997 | "Exhale (Shoop Shoop)" | Best Song Written Specifically for a Motion Picture or for Television | Nominated |
| 1997 | "It Hurts Like Hell" | Best Song Written Specifically for a Motion Picture or for Television | Nominated |
| 1997 | "Count On Me" | Best Song Written Specifically for a Motion Picture or for Television | Nominated |
| 1997 | "Change The World" (as a Producer) | Record of the Year | Won |
| 1997 | "Slow Jams" | Best R&B Performance by a Duo or Group with Vocal | Nominated |
| 1997 | — | Producer of the Year | Won |
| 1997 | Secrets | Best Pop Album | Nominated |
| 1997 | Waiting to Exhale: Original Soundtrack Album | Album of the Year | Nominated |
| 1998 | The Day | Album of the Year | Nominated |
| 1998 | The Day | Best R&B Album | Nominated |
| 1998 | "Every Time I Close My Eyes" | Best Male Pop Vocal Performance | Nominated |
| 1998 | — | Producer of the Year, Non-Classical | Won |
| 1998 | "A Song for Mama" | Best Song Written Specifically for a Motion Picture or for Television | Nominated |
| 1998 | "I Care 'Bout You" | Best Short Form Music Video | Nominated |
| 1998 | "How Come, How Long" (feat. Stevie Wonder) | Best Short Form Music Video | Nominated |
| 1998 | "How Come, How Long" (feat. Stevie Wonder) | Best Pop Collaboration with Vocals | Nominated |
| 1999 | "How Come, How Long" (Live) (feat. Stevie Wonder) | Best Pop Collaboration with Vocals | Nominated |
| 2000 | "When You Believe" | Best Song Written for a Motion Picture, Television or Other Visual Media | Nominated |
| 2000 | FanMail | Album of the Year | Nominated |
| 2009 | Tha Carter III (as a Featured artist) | Album of the Year | Nominated |
| 2013 | "Pray For Me" | Best R&B Song | Nominated |
| 2015 | Love, Marriage & Divorce (with Toni Braxton) | Best R&B Album | Won |
| 2016 | "Let It Burn" | Best R&B Song | Nominated |
| 2021 | — | Trustee | Won |
| 2023 | "Keeps on Fallin'" (with Ella Mai) | Best Traditional R&B Performance | Nominated |
| 2024 | "Simple" (with Coco Jones) | Best Traditional R&B Performance | Nominated |
| 2024 | Girls Night Out | Best R&B Album | Nominated |
| 2024 | "Snooze" (as songwriter) | Best R&B Song | Won |
