= R U Tuff Enuff =

1988 album by Rebbie Jackson

Studio album by Rebbie Jackson
- Released: February 1, 1988
- Recorded: 1987–1988
- Studio: The Lab Recording Studios (West Orange, New Jersey)
- Genre: R&B; pop
- Length: 37:49
- Label: Columbia
- Producer: David "Pic" Conley; David Townsend

Rebbie Jackson chronology
Reaction (1986)	R U Tuff Enuff (1988)	The Rebbie Jackson Collection (1996)

Singles from Reaction
- 1. "Plaything" Released: June 16, 1988; 2. "R U Tuff Enuff" Released: August 25, 1988

Professional ratings
Review scores
Source	Rating
AllMusic	1.5/5 stars

R U Tuff Enuff is the third studio album by American R&B singer Rebbie Jackson. This album was a different approach for Jackson, as it had a harder-edged street R&B sound that was very popular at the time—which was also exhibited on the La Toya album by Jackson's sister, La Toya Jackson.

== Release ==
The single "Plaything" peaked at number eight on the Billboard R&B charts, Jackson's highest-charting single since 1984's "Centipede." The title track was also released as a single, but it was not as commercially successful. Melle Mel guested on "R U Tuff Enuff."

After Centipede and You Send the Rain Away it was the third single of hers that had an accompanying music video (overall she has four, the video for Yours Faithfully was released ten years after Plaything).

== Critical reception ==
People wrote that the "album is such a blank-sounding snore that—if dopey spelling is going to be insisted on—it might have been called Noise R Us."

== Track listing ==
1. "Perfect Combination" (Everett Collins, David "Pic" Conley, David Townshend, Robbie Danzie) – 5:16
2. "Read Between the Lines" (Jack Ponti, David Conley, Vic Pepe, David Townshend) – 4:50
3. "This Love is Forever" (Everett Collins, Rebbie Jackson, David Conley, David Townshend) – 4:40
4. "R U Tuff Enuff" (Arthur McCallister, Rebbie Jackson, David Conley) – 4:10
5. "Plaything" (Joshua Thompson, Romeo Williams, Gene Lennon) – 4:56
6. "Friendship Song" (Joshua Thompson, David Conley, Gene Lennon) – 4:32
7. "Sweetest Dreams" (Joshua Thompson, Gene Lennon, Romeo Williams) – 4:08
8. "Distant Conversation" (Everett Collins, Derrick Culler, David Conley) – 5:17

== Charts ==
Chart (1988)	Peak position
US Top R&B/Hip-Hop Albums (Billboard)	58
