= The Rebbie Jackson Collection =

Compilation album by Rebbie Jackson
- Released: February 10, 1996
- Recorded: 1983–1988
- Genre: R&B/Pop
- Length: 45:57
- Label: Expansion
- Producer: Various

Rebbie Jackson chronology
R U Tuff Enuff (1988)	The Rebbie Jackson Collection (1996)	Yours Faithfully (1998)

The Rebbie Jackson Collection is a compilation album by American singer Rebbie Jackson.

The compilation was issued in 1996 throughout Europe due to Jackson's popularity in the rare groove scene in the 90's. It includes songs from her three 80's albums, mainly ballads and mid-tempo album tracks. Also included is her signature hit, Centipede.

For collectors, the album also includes the rare song Eternal Love, originally released as the B-side of her single A Fork in the Road.

== Track listing ==
1. "This Love Is Forever" 4:39
2. "Friendship Song" 4:32
3. "Eternal Love" 4:17
4. "Open Up My Love" 4:10
5. "Always Wanting Something" 4:24
6. "Ready for Love" 3:00
7. "Hey Boy" 4:30
8. "A Fork in the Road" (Smokey Robinson, Pete Moore, Ronnie White) 3:43
9. "Tonight I'm Yours" (duet with Isaac Hayes) 4:04
10. "Sweetest Dreams" 4:07
11. "Centipede" (Michael Jackson) 4:25
