= Where Did We Go Wrong =

Where Did We Go Wrong may refer to:

- "Where Did We Go Wrong" (Dondria song), 2010
- "Where Did We Go Wrong" (Toni Braxton and Babyface song), 2013
- "Where Did We Go Wrong", a song by Petula Clark from the album My Love
- "Where Did We Go Wrong", a song by Diana Ross from the album Ross
- "Where Did We Go Wrong", a 1980 song by Frankie Valli
- "Where Did We Go Wrong", a 1980 song by L.T.D.
