= Jackson family (disambiguation) =

The Jackson family is an American family of singers and entertainers

Jackson family may refer to:

== People ==
- Rebbie Jackson (born 1950)
- Jackie Jackson (born 1951)
- Tito Jackson (1953–2024)
- Jermaine Jackson (born 1954)
- La Toya Jackson (born 1956)
- Marlon Jackson (born 1957)
- Michael Jackson (1958–2009)
- Randy Jackson (The Jacksons) (born 1961)
- Janet Jackson (born 1966)

== Bands ==
- 3T an American R&B/pop music group
- The Jackson 5, an American popular family music group
