= I Heart You (Toni Braxton song) =

Single by Toni Braxton
- Released: March 29, 2012
- Genre: EDM; house; dance
- Length: 4:08
- Label: Atlantic; Inot
- Songwriters: Toni Braxton; Keri Lewis
- Producers: Toni Braxton; Keri Lewis

Toni Braxton singles chronology
"Make My Heart" (2010)	"I Heart You" (2012)	"Hurt You" (2013)

"I Heart You" is a song by American recording artist Toni Braxton. It was written and produced by Toni Braxton & Keri Lewis. The song was released as a non-album single on March 29, 2012 by Atlantic Records and Inot Records. Musically, the song is a dance-pop, EDM and house song and the lyrics speak about being in love with someone and desiring that the person feels the same. The song received positive reviews, most critics commended the track for having a "dance vibe" and an "anthemic chorus".

== Background ==
In 2011, Toni Braxton became an independent artist by parting ways with, her then manager, Vincent Herbert and signing a new management deal with Los Angeles-based entertainment/production company The Collective LA. "I Heart You" was released and made available for free digital download through website Pro Motion on March 9, 2012. The track was written and produced by Toni Braxton and Keri Lewis. Toni later spoke about writing sessions for the song, saying:

"When I wrote this song I was thinking about the feeling you get when you walk into a club and you hear the melody, you feel the beat and you just know it’s going to be a good night."

== Composition ==
"I Heart You" is a dance, EDM, and house track that runs over a thumping club beat. The song follows a simple formula, as noted by Becky Bain of Idolator, who continued, "Braxton's thumping ode to love comes in slow and steady, and eventually builds." According to Rap-Up, "the diva melts the track with her sultry vocals while burning up the dance floor." In an interview with music blog That Grape Juice, Toni spoke about the song, revealing, "you're going to want to dance all night. Let's say it's probably very 'Last Dance'-ish." Lyrically, "I Heart You" alludes to the feeling of longing for a man that loves another woman. As the feeling is not reciprocated, she dances her troubles away on the dance floor.

Although the first thirty seconds of ‘I Heart You’ sound like a ballad, she soon kicks into the chorus and the thumping beat begins to blast. In the verses, she pulls words and notes out in such lines as "I feel your lips / Your tender kiss / Just ooh, ooh, oooooooh" with emotion. Despite the song being called ‘I Heart You’, the lyrics are actually "I love you", but the lines ‘I love you, but you love her’ and ‘Damn, I know it’s wrong / But you turn me on" suddenly suggest that this love song is also about infidelity. By the middle eight, the song breaks down with heavy dance beats as Toni croons slowly "I think I’m gonna dance / Dance all my troubles all away".

== Critical reception ==
The song received positive reception by music critics. Becky Bain from Idolator gave to the song a positive review, writing that "Braxton’s thumping ode to love comes in slow and steady, and eventually builds – though we think it could have been pushed even further. It’s a pleasant, if not wholly commanding, offering for her first single in two years." John Mitchell from MTV News wrote positively that "is a massive, anthemic banger that we can already hear blasting out of every club everywhere." A review from Rap-Up said that Braxton "melts the track with her sultry vocals while burning up the dance floor." Tan Young, from the British website So So Gay, gave to the song 3.5 out of 5 stars, and praised "her soulful vocals, distinctive and beautiful as ever, and the way she pulls off dance music surprisingly well." However, he dismissed "the lyrics in the chorus and middle eight that could be better" and said that "the end is rather anti-climactic." He ended up the review, stating that:

"I Heart You shows a different, more versatile and fun side to Toni as she takes on an uptempo track and yet manages to keep her vocals as smooth as ever, bar a few Etta James-like growls, whilst still singing at the same pace as if she were doing a power ballad. While dance music may be big right now, can Braxton separate herself from everyone else with this 90s-influenced and Crystal Waters-inspired song and sound? The answer, yes she could, but at the same time, we still miss the ‘Unbreak My Heart’ and ‘He Wasn't Man Enough’ Toni Braxton we know and love."

== Music video ==
A music video for the song was shot on March 18, 2012. Pictures featuring Toni wearing a pink swimsuit were released. Bille Woodruff directed the video, he also has directed many of her videos, including "Un-Break My Heart", "He Wasn't Man Enough" and her three latest videos from Pulse. Nick Denbeigh makes a cameo appearance portraying three roles: the sexy dream hunk, the romantic leading man, and the hot club DJ. A review from Rap-Up wrote that "Looking gorgeous in a number of sexy outfits, the iconic singer seduces the camera and busts out a few dance moves of her own."

== Charts ==
=== Weekly charts ===
Chart (2012)	Peak position
US Hot Dance Club Songs (Billboard)	1

=== Year-end charts ===
Chart (2012)	Position
US Hot Dance Club Songs (Billboard)	43

== Release history ==
Country	Date	Format	Label
United States	March 9, 2012	Music streaming	Inot
United States	March 29, 2012	Digital download	Inot

== See also ==
- List of number-one dance singles of 2012 (U.S.)
