= Duet =

Musical composition or arrangement for two performers

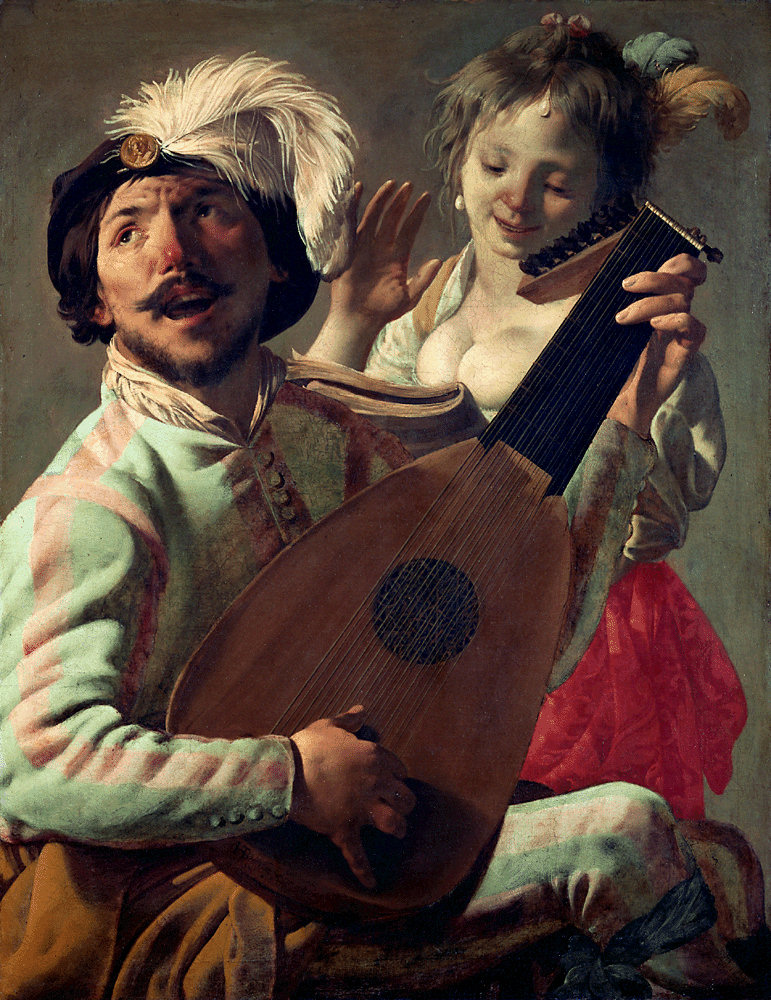
The Duet (1628), by Hendrick ter Brugghen

A duet (Italian: duo or duetto) is a musical composition for two performers in which the performers have equal importance to the piece, often a composition involving two singers or two pianists. A piece performed by two pianists performing together on the same piano is a "piano duet" or "piano four hands". A piece for two pianists performing together on separate pianos is a "piano duo".

"Duet" is also used as a verb for the act of performing a musical duet, or colloquially as a noun to refer to the performers of a duet.

A musical ensemble with more than two solo instruments or voices is called a trio, quartet, quintet, sextet, septet, octet, etc.

== History ==
When Mozart was young, he and his sister Marianne played a duet of his composition at a London concert in 1765. The four-hand, described as a duet, was in many of his compositions which included five sonatas; a set of variations, two performers and one instrument, and a sonata for two pianos. The first published sonata or duet was in 1777.

In Renaissance music, a duet specifically intended as a teaching tool, to be performed by teacher and student, was called a bicinium (see Étude).

== In opera ==
Duets have always been a part of the structure of operas. Early 16th-century operas such as L'Orfeo and L'incoronazione di Poppea involve duets throughout the performance. In 17th-century Italy duets were often used in comic scenes within serious operas. In Baroque France the duet was popular in tragedies, such as songs of vengeance and confrontation. The love duet was characterized by singing in close harmonies of 3rds and 6ths, symbolizing unity after conflict.

=== Famous operatic duets ===
- "Abends will ich schlafen gehn" (Hänsel, Gretel) from Humperdinck's Hänsel und Gretel
- "Ah guarda, sorella" (Fiordiligi, Dorabella), "Il core vi dono" (Guglielmo, Dorabella), and "Prenderò quel brunettino" (Dorabella, Fiordiligi) from Mozart's Così fan tutte
- "Ah, perdona al primo affetto" (Annio, Servilia) form Mozart's La clemenza di Tito
- "All'idea di quel metallo" (Figaro, Conte) and "Dunque io son" (Rosina, Figaro) from Rossini's The Barber of Seville
- "A te, o cara" (Artuo, Elvira), "Suoni la tromba" (Riccardo, Giorgio) and "Vieni fra queste braccia" (Arturo, Elvira) from Bellini's I puritani
- "Au fond du temple saint" (Nadir, Zurga) from Bizet's The Pearl Fishers
- "Belle nuit, ô nuit d'amour" (Giulietta, Nicklausse) from Offenbach's The Tales of Hoffmann
- "Bess, You Is My Woman Now" and "I Loves You, Porgy" (Porgy, Bess) from Gershwin's Porgy and Bess
- "Bimba dagli occhi pieni di malia" (Pinkerton, Butterfly), "Il cannone del porto!" (aka "Duetto dei fiori" or the "Flower duet") (Suzuki Butterfly), and "Vogliatemi bene" (Butterfly, Pinkerton) from Puccini's Madama Butterfly
- "C'est toi! – C'est moi!" (Carmen, José), "Parle-moi de ma mère" (José, Micaëla), and "Près des remparts de Séville" (Carmen, José) from Bizet's Carmen
- "Cinque, dieci, venti" (Figaro, Susanna) and "Sull'aria ... che soave zeffiretto" (Susanna, Contessa) from Mozart's The Marriage of Figaro
- "Deh, perdona, o dolce bene" (Guido, Emilia) from Handel's Flavio
- "Dio che nell'alma infondere" (Don Carlo, Rodrigo) and "Io vengo a domandar grazia mia Regina" (Don Carlo, Elisabetta) from Verdi's Don Carlo
- "Dôme épais le jasmin" (Lakmé, Mallika) (aka “Flower Duet”) from Delibes's Lakmé
- "Esulti pur la Barbara" (Nemorino, Adina) and "Venti scudi!" (Nemorino, Belcore) from Donizetti's The Elixir of Love
- "E un anatèma" (Gioconda, Laura) from Ponchielli's La Gioconda
- "Figlia! – Mio Padre!" and "Sì, vendetta" from Verdi's (Rigoletto, Gilda) Rigoletto
- "Già nella notte densa" (Otello, Desdemona) and "Si, pel ciel marmoreo giuro" (Otello, Iago) from Verdi's Otello
- "Glück, das mir verblieb" (Marietta, Paul) from Die Tote Stadt
- "I know a youth" (Robin, Rosebud) from Gilbert and Sullivan's Ruddigore
- "In mia man alfin tu sei" (Norma, Pollione) and "Mira, O Norma" (Adalgisa, Norma) from Bellini's Norma
- "Là ci darem la mano" (Don Giovanni, Zerlina) from Mozart's Don Giovanni
- "Líbej mne, líbej, mír mi přej" (Prince, Rusalka) from Dvořák's Rusalka
- "Libiamo ne' lieti calici" (aka Brindisi), "Parigi o cara", and "Un dì, felice, eterea" (Alfredo, Violetta) from Verdi's La traviata
- "Liebesnacht" and "O sink’ hernieder, Nacht der Liebe" (Tistan, Isolde) from Wagner's Tristan und Isolde
- "Lontano, lontano" (Faust, Margherita) from Boito's Mefistofele
- “Mario! Mario! – Son qui!” (Tosca, Cavaradossi) from Puccini's Tosca
- "Mira, d'acerbe lagrime" (Leonora, Conte) from Verdi's Il trovatore
- "Non mi tentar!" (Nedda, Silvio) from Leoncavallo's Pagliacci
- "Nuit d’hyméné", "Ô nuit divine! je t'implore", "Ah! ne fuis pas encore!", and "Adieu mille fois!" (Roméo Juliette) from Gounod's Roméo et Juliette
- "Nuit d'ivresse et d'extase infinie!" (Didon, Énée) from Berlioz's Les Troyens
- "O saro la più bella!" (Manon, Des Grieux) from Puccini's Manon Lescaut
- "O soave fanciulla" (Rodolfo, Mimì) from Puccini's La bohème
- "O terra, addio" (Aida, Radamès) from Verdi's Aida
- "Pa-Pa-Pa-Papageno" (Papageno, Papagena) and "Bei Männern, welche Liebe fühlen" (Pamina, Papageno) from Mozart's The Magic Flute
- "Qui di sposa eterna fede" and "Verranno a te sull' aure" (Lucia, Edgardo) from Donizetti's Lucia di Lammermoor
- "Pur ti miro" (Poppea, Nerone) from Monteverdi's L'incoronazione di Poppea
- "Serbami ognor" (Semiramide, Arsace) from Rossini's Semiramide
- "So go to him and say to him" (Jane, Bunthorne) from Gilbert and Sullivan's Patience
- "So kommen Sie! 's ist niemand hier!" (Valencienne, Camille) from Lehar's The Merry Widow
- "Solenne in quest'ora" (Don Alvaro, Don Carlo) from Verdi's La forza del destino
- "Son nata a lagrimar" (Cornelia, Sesto) from Handel's Giulio Cesare
- "Straniero, ascolta" (Turandot, Calaf) from Puccini's Turandot
- "Suzel, buon dì" (aka "The Cherry Duet") (Fritz, Suzel) Mascagni's L'amico Fritz
- "Teco io sto" (Riccardo, Amelia) from Verdi's Un Ballo in Maschera
- "Toi! Vous!" (Des Grieux, Manon) from Massenet’s Manon
- "Tornami a dir che m'ami" (Ernesto, Norina) from Donizetti's Don Pasquale
- "Tu qui, Santuzza?" (Turridu, Santuzza) from Cavalleria rusticana
- "Un soave non so che" (Ramiro, Cenerentola) from Rossini's La Cenerentola
- "We're called Gondolieri" (Giuseppe, Marco) from Gilbert and Sullivan's The Gondoliers

== In pop music ==
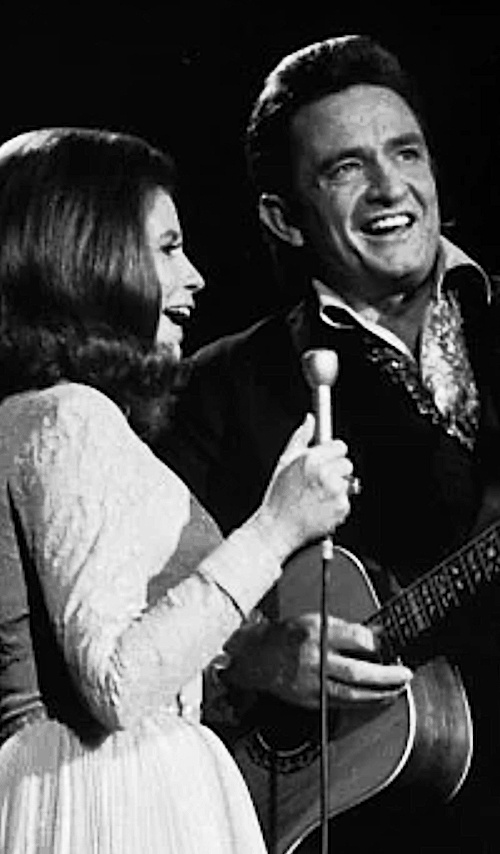
Johnny Cash & June Carter

Throughout the 20th and 21st centuries, duets have been common in the popular music of their respective eras. In addition to a standard vocal duet, some songs have been written to be heard as conversations; for example, "Baby, It's Cold Outside". Other songs are performed around a theme; for example, New York City in "Empire State of Mind". Occasionally, duets are an improvisation between artists; for example, "Under Pressure" by Queen and David Bowie. Bowie and Queen frontman Freddie Mercury reportedly composed the lyrics in a day by improvising together. Duets are also common in musical movies and musical theatre; "Fit as a Fiddle" for the 1952 movie Singin' in the Rain and its corresponding play of the same name.

=== Notable pop duets ===
- "Baby, It's Cold Outside" – Ricardo Montalbán and Esther Williams, and with roles reversed, Red Skelton and Betty Garrett, 1948
- "Dream a Little Dream of Me" – Louis Armstrong and Ella Fitzgerald, 1950
- "Chaplin and Keaton Violin and Piano Duet" – Limelight, 1952
- "I Got You Babe" – Sonny & Cher, 1965
- "Ain't No Mountain High Enough" – Marvin Gaye and Tammi Terrell, 1967
- "Jackson" – Johnny Cash and June Carter, 1967
- "Somethin' Stupid" – Frank Sinatra and Nancy Sinatra, 1967
- "Waters of March" – Elis Regina and Antonio Carlos Jobim, 1972
- "Don't Go Breaking My Heart" – Elton John and Kiki Dee, 1976
- "You're The One That I Want" – John Travolta and Olivia Newton-John, 1978
- "Endless Love" – Diana Ross and Lionel Richie, 1981
- "Under Pressure" – Queen and David Bowie, 1981
- "Up Where We Belong" – Joe Cocker and Jennifer Warnes, 1982
- "Ebony and Ivory" – Paul McCartney and Stevie Wonder, 1982
- "Islands in the Stream" – Kenny Rogers and Dolly Parton, 1983
- "Say Say Say" – Paul McCartney and Michael Jackson, 1983
- "Don't Give Up" – Peter Gabriel and Kate Bush, 1986
- "Nothing's Gonna Stop Us Now" – Starship, 1987
- "Always" – Atlantic Starr, 1987
- "(I've Had) The Time of My Life" – Bill Medley and Jennifer Warnes, 1987
- "One Sweet Day" – Mariah Carey and Boyz II Men, 1995
- "Scream" – Michael Jackson and Janet Jackson, 1995
- "It's Your Love" – Tim McGraw and Faith Hill, 1997
- "Tell Him" – Barbra Streisand and Celine Dion, 1997
- "I'm Your Angel" – R. Kelly and Celine Dion, 1998
- "The Boy Is Mine" – Brandy and Monica, 1998
- "When You Believe" – Whitney Houston and Mariah Carey, 1998
- "Where You Are" – Jessica Simpson and Nick Lachey, 2000
- "Nobody Wants to Be Lonely" – Ricky Martin and Christina Aguilera, 2001
- "I Belong to You (Il ritmo della passione)" – Eros Ramazzotti and Anastacia, 2006
- "Beautiful Liar" – Beyoncé and Shakira, 2007
- "No Estamos Solos" – Eros Ramazzotti and Ricky Martin, 2007
- "Limpido" – Laura Pausini and Kylie Minogue, 2013
- "Hurt You" – Toni Braxton and Babyface, 2014
- "Bad Things" – Machine Gun Kelly and Camila Cabello, 2016
- "Die with a Smile" – Lady Gaga and Bruno Mars, 2024

== Virtual duets ==
In addition to traditional duets performed live—either in front of an audience or recorded in a studio—a so-called virtual duet can be created by having a singer (or musician) perform over the top of a pre-existing recording. Such a duet is a form of overdubbing. A virtual duet is sometimes done when the singer (or musician) of the original recording is deceased; for example, a live performance by Paul McCartney on "I've Got a Feeling" with an isolated vocal recording of John Lennon from The Beatles' famous rooftop performance, or a recording of Judy Garland being dubbed over by her daughter Lorna Luft on "Have Yourself A Merry Little Christmas". It can also be done with an earlier version of oneself (such as Yusuf / Cat Stevens on "Father And Son"); incidentally, Ronan Keating did his own virtual duet with Yusuf on the same song. Virtual duets may also be done live via video link (such as Shaun Escoffery duetting with the late Eva Cassidy's videotaped performance of "Over the Rainbow" in honour of the late Sir Terry Wogan) or be constructed manually from two pre-existing recordings, generally where each singer/musician can have their own isolated audio channel in the form of a stem.

Entire albums of virtual duets have been created, including albums by Frank Sinatra (Duets and Duets II).
