= Roller Coaster (Toni Braxton and Babyface song) =

Single by Toni Braxton and Babyface

from the album Love, Marriage & Divorce
- Released: May 24, 2014
- Studio: Brandon's Way Recording Studios (Los Angeles County, CA)
- Length: 4:23
- Label: Motown
- Songwriter(s): Kenneth "Babyface" Edmonds; Daryl Simmons; Antonio Dixon
- Producer(s): Babyface

Toni Braxton singles chronology
"Where Did We Go Wrong" (2013)	"Roller Coaster" (2014)	"Deadwood" (2017)

Babyface singles chronology
"Where Did We Go Wrong" (2013)	"Roller Coaster" (2014)	"We've Got Love" (2015)

"Roller Coaster" is a song by American recording artists Toni Braxton and Babyface. It was written by Babyface, Daryl Simmons, and Antonio Dixon for their collaborative studio album Love, Marriage & Divorce (2014), while production was helmed by former. The song was released on May 24, 2014 as the album's third and final single. "Roller Coaster" peaked at number 17 on the US Adult R&B Songs and was ranked 48th on the chart's year-end listing. Braxton and Babyface performed on their joint Toni Braxton & Babyface African Tour in 2015.

== Commercial performance ==
"Roller Coaster" debuted on the US Adult R&B Songs at number seventeen on June 14, 2014. It spent a total of eighteen weeks on the chart alone.

== Track listings ==
Digital download

- "Roller Coaster" – 4:23

== Credits and personnel ==
Credits adapted from the liner notes of Love, Marriage & Divorce.

- Toni Braxton – vocals, background vocals
- Antonio Dixon – drum programming, percussion, programming, composer
- Kenneth "Babyface" Edmonds – drum programming, composer, producer, vocals
- Daryl Simmons – background vocals, composer, additional vocal production

== Charts ==
=== Weekly charts ===
Chart (2014)	Peak position
US Adult R&B Songs (Billboard)	17

=== Year-end charts ===
Chart (2014)	Position
US Adult R&B Songs (Billboard)	48
