= Hands Tied =

Single by Toni Braxton

from the album Pulse
- Released: February 23, 2010
- Studio: Mason Sound Studios (North Hollywood, CA)
- Length: 3:55
- Label: Atlantic
- Songwriters: Heather Bright; Warren "Oak" Felder; Harvey Mason Jr.
- Producers: Oak Felder; Mason

Toni Braxton singles chronology
"Yesterday" (2009)	"Hands Tied" (2010)	"Make My Heart" (2010)

"Hands Tied" is a song by American singer Toni Braxton, taken from her sixth studio album Pulse (2010). It was written by Heather Bright, Warren "Oak" Felder, and Harvey Mason Jr., while production was helmed by Oak and Mason. A mid-paced contemporary R&B ballad, the instrumentation of "Hands Tied" consists essentially of synthesizers, electric guitar, and a cascading piano line. Lyrically, it features Braxton as the protagonist talking about how she could love a man with her hands tied, singing in double entendres with repeated phrases in the chorus of "Hands Tied."

The song was released as the second single from Pulse along with the uptempo track "Make My Heart" and issued by Atlantic Records to urban radio stations on February 23, 2010 in the United States. The track entered the top 30 of the US Billboard Hot R&B/Hip-Hop Songs, peaking at number 29, while also reaching number six on the US Adult R&B Songs. Braxton reunited with director Bille Woodruff to film the music video for "Hands Tied" which depicts the singer as a pole dancer on stage. Actors Michael Jai White, Cory Hardrict and others make a cameo appearance in the video.

== Background ==
"Hands Tied" was written by Heather Bright, Warren "Oak" Felder, and Harvey Mason Jr. Production was helmed by Felder and Mason, with Bright providing backing vocals. Recording of the song took place at the Mason Sound Studios in North Hollywood, with Andrew Hey and Dabling Harward overseeing. David Boyd and Michael Daley served as their assistants. Mason also mixed "Hands Tied." Musically, the song is a seductive contemporary R&B ballad that opens with a cascading piano line. It has Braxton singing repeated phrases in the chorus, backed by multitracked vocal harmonies and an electric guitar.

== Promotion ==
Braxton appeared on The Mo'Nique Show on May 3, 2010, a day before the release of parental album Pulse. She performed "Hands Tied" as well as her 1993 hit single "Breathe Again." Braxton also appeared on NBC's The Today Show, also performing "Hands Tied" as well as "Unbreak My Heart" (1996) on the day that the album was released.

== Chart performance ==
"Hands Tied" first appeared at number 80 on the US Billboard Hot R&B/Hip-Hop Songs. In its 14th week, the song peaked at number 29. "Hands Tied" spent 20 weeks on the chart, with Billboard ranking it 100th on the Hot R&B/Hip-Hop Songs year-end chart. The song also peaked at number six on the US Adult R&B Songs chart. It was ranked 17th on the chart's year-end listing.

== Music video ==
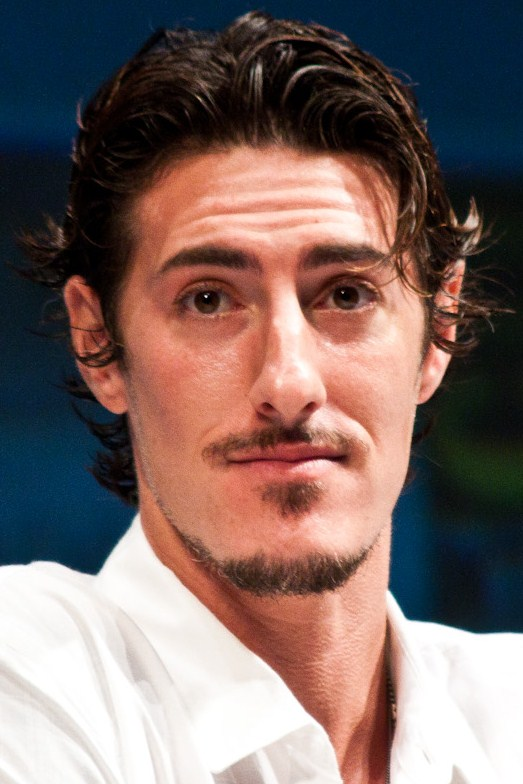
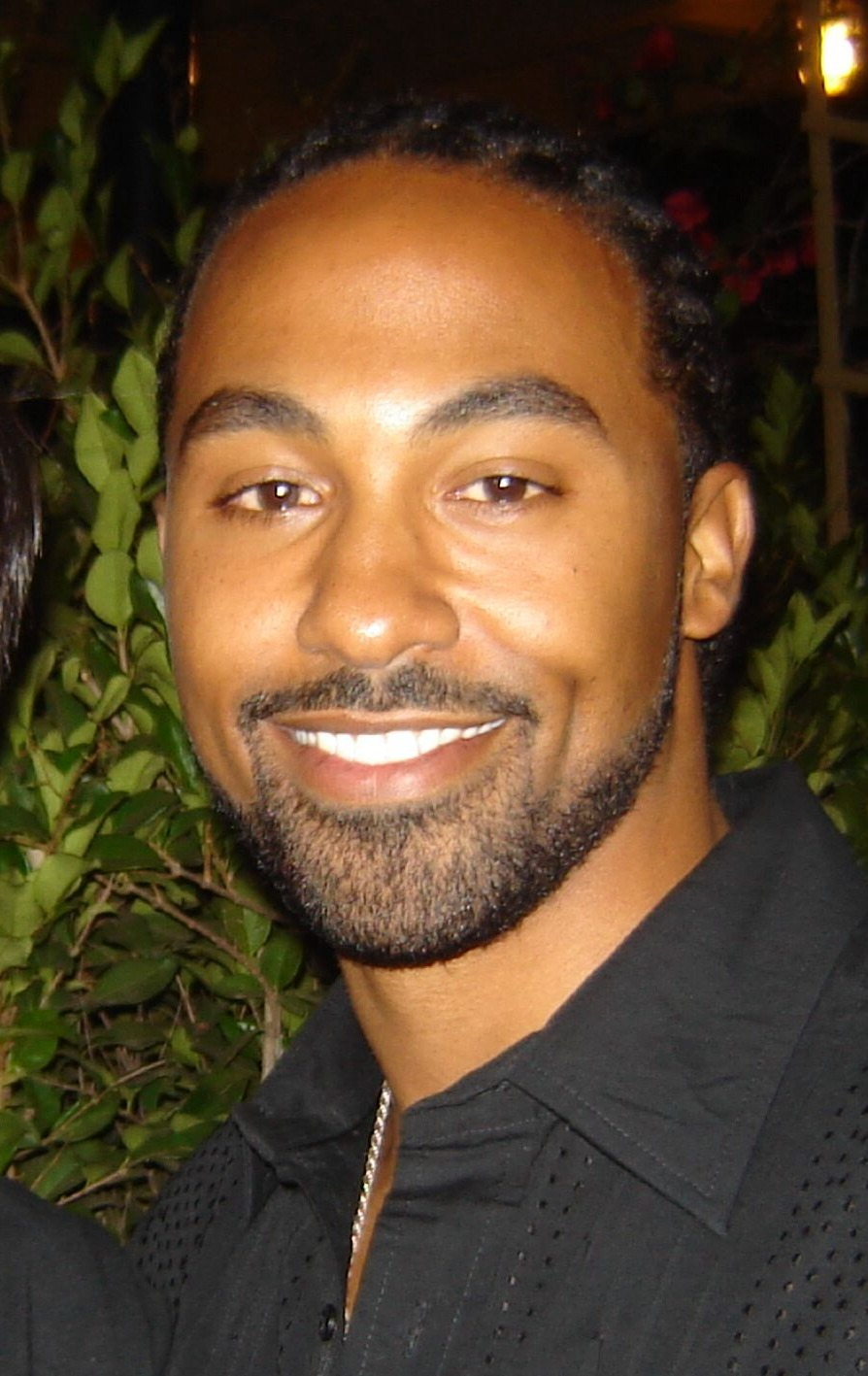
Eric Balfour (left) and Jensen Atwood (right) make cameo appearances in the video.

A music video for "Hands Tied" was shot back-to-back with the video for fellow Pulse single "Make My Heart." Directed by Bille Woodruff, it marked his eighth collaboration with Braxton. The video depicts Braxton as a "woman [who] is teasing a bar full of men who are mesmerized by her moves, but are not allowed to touch her," performing a pole dancing tease while singing. Actors Michael Jai White, Cory Hardrict, Eric Balfour, Victor Webster, Robert Scott Wilson, Ryan Paevey and Jensen Atwood make cameo appearances in the video. The final clip was premiered on April 14, 2010.

== Track listing ==
Remix single
No.	Title	Length
1.	"Hands Tied" (Hex Hector Club Mix)	7:21
2.	"Hands Tied" (Hex Hector Remix – Radio Edit)	4:35

== Personnel ==
Credits adapted from liner notes of Pulse.

- David Boyd – recording assistance
- Heather Bright – writing, backing vocals
- Michael Daley – mixing, recording assistance
- Oak Felder – producer
- Dabling Harward – additional recording
- Andrew Hey – recording
- Harvey Mason Jr. – producer, mixing

== Charts ==
=== Weekly charts ===
Weekly chart performance for "Hands Tied"
Chart (2010)	Peak position
US Adult R&B Songs (Billboard)	6
US Hot R&B/Hip-Hop Songs (Billboard)	29

=== Year-end charts ===
Year-end chart performance for "Hands Tied"
Chart (2010)	Position
US Adult R&B Songs (Billboard)	17
US Hot R&B/Hip-Hop Songs (Billboard)	100

== Release history ==
Release history and formats for "Hands Tied"
Region	Date	Format	Label	Ref.
United States	February 23, 2010	Urban contemporary radio	Atlantic Records	
Various	April 27, 2010	Remix single	Atlantic Records	
