= Bille Woodruff =

American director

- Born: Denver, Colorado, U.S.
- Education: Open High School (Virginia) University of Maryland
- Occupations: Film director; music video director

Bille Woodruff is a director of film, television and music videos, noted for directing many videos for a number of R&B and hip-hop artists since the mid-1990s. These artists include Joe, for whom Woodruff has directed nine music videos since 1994, and Toni Braxton, with whom he has worked 10 times since 1996. Woodruff directed the videos for some of Braxton's biggest singles, including "Un-Break My Heart", "You're Makin' Me High", and "He Wasn't Man Enough".

== Film and television career ==
Woodruff directed the 2003 film Honey. Rumors stated singer and actress Aaliyah was originally slated to play the title role, but died before filming began. However, Woodruff said, "That’s incorrect. It was supposed to be Beyoncé. That’s been widely reported but it’s incorrect. She couldn’t do it because of her touring schedule for her first album Dangerously in Love." She was replaced by Jessica Alba. The film was released on December 5, 2003 and opened at #2 at the US Box Office, earning $12,856,040 in its opening weekend. The film received generally negative reviews from critics, with a rating of 20% on Rotten Tomatoes, but favorable reviews from moviegoers, with a rating of 76% on Rotten Tomatoes.

Woodruff then directed the 2005 film Beauty Shop, a spin-off of the Barbershop film trilogy, starring Queen Latifah. The film was released on March 30, 2005 and went on to gross worldwide $37,245,453 at the worldwide box office. Movie critics' reviews were generally negative, generating a rating of 38% on Rotten Tomatoes. However, moviegoers liked the movie, giving it a 70% rating on Rotten Tomatoes.

He then directed the 2009 film Bring It On: Fight to the Finish, starring Christina Milian. The film was released straight-to-DVD on September 1, 2009.

He directed the straight-to-DVD sequel to Honey, Honey 2, which was released in 2011.

He released the movie Rags on Nickelodeon in 2012. He directed seven episodes of The Game TV series in 2012 and 2013.

Woodruff directed the film adaptation of the best-selling novel of the same name Addicted and A Very Larry Christmas.

In 2015, Woodruff directed Honey 3 in South Africa with new fresh Talent including Bobby Lockwood and 'Kenny Wormald.

He directed the film The Perfect Match starring Terence Jenkins and Paula Patton in 2016.

Since 2016, he has directed numerous episodes of the following television series: Hit the Floor, Star, Empire and Black Lightning.

In 2024, he was the director of Bridgerton.

== Videography ==
1991

- Sounds of Blackness – "Optimistic"
- The S.O.S. Band – "Sometimes I Wonder"

1994

- Born Jamericans – "Boom Shak-a-tak"
- Joe – "The One for Me"

1995

- A Few Good Men - "Have I never"

1996

- Joi – "Ghetto Superstar"
- Tony Rich Project – "Nobody Knows"
- Toni Braxton – "You're Makin' Me High"
- Tony Rich Project – "Like a Woman"
- Backstreet Boys – "I'll Never Break Your Heart" (version 2: USA)
- Tony Rich Project – "Leavin'"
- Toni Braxton – "Un-Break My Heart"
- Gloria Estefan – "I'm Not Giving You Up"
- T-Boz feat. Richie Rich – "Touch Myself"
- Luther Vandross – "I Can Make It Better"
- Dru Hill – "In My Bed" (version 1)
- Puff Johnson – "All Over Your Face"
- Tevin Campbell – "Back To The World"

1997

- Backstreet Boys – "Nunca Te Haré Llorar"
- OutKast – "Jazzy Belle"
- Toni Braxton – "I Don't Want To"
- Ginuwine – "I'll Do Anything"/"I'm Sorry"
- Timbaland & Magoo feat. Missy Elliott & Aaliyah – "Up Jumps Da' Boogie"
- Usher – "You Make Me Wanna"
- Salt-N-Pepa – "R U Ready?"
- Celine Dion – "My Heart Will Go On"
- Az Yet – "Hard To Say I'm Sorry"
- Jody Watley – "Off the Hook"
- Brownstone – "Kiss And Tell"
- Chico DeBarge – "Iggin Me"
- Born Jamericans – "Send My Love"
- Lysette – "Young, Sad & Blue"
- Phajja – "What Are You Waiting For"

1998

- Babyface & Des'ree – "Fire"
- Gloria Estefan – "Heaven's What I Feel"/"Corazon Prohibido"
- Joe – "All That I Am"
- Dru Hill – "These Are The Times"
- Celine Dion & R. Kelly – "I'm Your Angel"
- Next – "Too Close"
- Next – "I Still Love You"
- Brian Mcknight – "The Only One For Me"
- Chico DeBarge & Joe – "No Guarantee"
- Rebbie Jackson – "Yours Faithfully"
- Tony Rich Project – "Silly Man"
- Luther Vandross – "I Know Remix"
- Chico DeBarge – "Love Still Good"
- Myron – "Destiny"
- Debelah Morgan – "Yesterday"
- Chico DeBarge – "Virgin"
- Imajin – "No Doubt"
- Derrick Dimitry - Get It On Tonite

1999

- Foxy Brown feat. Total – "I Can't"
- Celine Dion – "Then You Look at Me"
- Honeyz – "Love of a Lifetime"
- 702 – "Where My Girls At?"
- R. Kelly feat. Nas – "Did You Ever Think" (remix)
- Kelly Price feat. Jermaine Dupri – "Secret Love"
- 702 – "You Don't Know"
- Blaque – "I Do"
- Jessica Simpson – "I Wanna Love You Forever"
- Blaque – "Bring It All to Me"
- Britney Spears – "Born to Make You Happy"
- Marc Nelson – "15 Minutes"
- Shanice – "When I Close My Eyes"
- Shanice – "You Need A Man"
- Mint Condition – "If You Love Me"
- Trisha Yearwood – "You're Where I Belong"
- Joy Enriquez – "How Can I Not Love You"
- Chico Debarge – "Give You What You Want (Fa Sure)"

2000

- Celine Dion – "Live (For the One I Love)"
- TLC – "Dear Lie"
- Joe – "I Wanna Know"
- Toni Braxton – "He Wasn't Man Enough"
- Mary J. Blige – "Your Child"
- Toni Braxton feat. Dr. Dre – "Just Be A Man About It"
- Joe – "Treat Her Like a Lady"
- Kelly Price – "You Should've Told Me"
- Toni Braxton – "Spanish Guitar"
- Kandi – "Don't Think I'm Not
- 98 Degrees – "My Everything"
- Ruff Endz – "No More"
- BeBe Winans feat. Joe and Brian McKnight – "Coming Back Home"
- Chanté Moore – "Straight Up"

2001

- Lucy Pearl feat. Snoop Dogg and Q-Tip – "You"
- Ray J feat. Lil' Kim – "Wait a Minute"
- Mary Mary feat. Kirk Franklin – "Thank You"
- Blu Cantrell – "I'll Find a Way"
- Fat Joe feat. R. Kelly – "We Thuggin'"
- Babyface – "What If"
- R. Kelly – "The World's Greatest"
- Lil Wayne feat. Mannie Fresh, Birdman (rapper) Mack 10 & Mickey – "Shine"
- Britney Spears – "Overprotected" (original version)
- R. Kelly – "The Storm Is Over Now"
- The Isley Brothers feat. R. Kelly and Chanté Moore – "Contagious"
- R. Kelly – "Feelin' on Yo Booty"
- Remy Shand – "Take a Message"

2002

- Fat Joe feat. Ashanti – "What's Luv?"
- Joe – "What If a Woman"
- Nelly – "Hot in Herre" (version 1)
- Christina Milian – "When You Look at Me"
- Kirk Franklin – "Brighter Day"
- Joe – "Let's Stay Home Tonight"
- Laura Pausini – "Surrender" (version 1)

2003

- Nick Lachey – "Shut Up"
- R. Kelly – "Ignition (Remix)"
- The Isley Brothers feat. JS – "Busted"
- The Isley Brothers feat. R. Kelly – "What Would You Do?"

2005

- B5 – "All I Do"
- Britney Spears – "Do Somethin'"
- R. Kelly feat. Wisin & Yandel – "Burn It Up"
- Artists for Hurricane Relief – "Come Together Now"
- Sharissa feat. R. Kelly – "In Love with a Thug"

2006

- The Isley Brothers – "Just Came Here to Chill"
- Joe feat. Papoose – "Where You At"
- 3LW feat. Jermaine Dupri – "Feelin' You"
- Mary J. Blige – "Take Me as I Am"

2007

- Paula DeAnda feat. Bow Wow – "Easy"

2008

- Trina – "Single Again"
- Enrique Iglesias feat. Lil Wayne – "Push"
- Joe – "Why Just Be Friends"

2009

- Miranda Cosgrove – "About You Now"
- Toni Braxton – "Yesterday"

2010

- Dru Hill – "Love MD"
- Toni Braxton – "Make My Heart"
- Toni Braxton – "Hands Tied"
- Cymia – "Kid Nation"
- Chris Willis – "Louder"
- Shayne Ward – "Gotta Be Somebody"

2011

- Jay Sean featuring Lil Wayne – "Hit the Lights"
- Kat Graham – "Love Will Never Do Without an Escapade (Janet Mashup)"

2012

- Toni Braxton – "I Heart You"

2014

- Joe feat. Kelly Rowland – "Love & Sex, Pt. 2"

2017

- Toni Braxton – "Deadwood"

== Filmography ==
Film

- Honey (2003)
- Beauty Shop (2005)
- Bring It On: Fight to the Finish (2009)
- Honey 2 (2011)
- Rags (2012)
- Addicted (2014)
- Drumline: A New Beat (2014)
- The Perfect Match (2016)
- Honey 3: Dare to Dance (2016)
- Honey: Rise Up and Dance (2018)
- The Cheetah Girls: Next Gen (2027)

Television

Year	Title	Episodes
2012–2014	The Game	11 episodes
2016–2018	Hit the Floor	4 episodes
2017	Shadowhunters	"You Are Not Your Own"
2017	Daytime Divas	"We Are Family"
2017	Greenleaf	"Silence and Loneliness"
2017–2019	Star	5 episodes
2017–2020	Empire	5 episodes
2018	Claws	"Scream"
2018–2021	Black Lightning	7 episodes
2019	Perfect Harmony	"Merry Jaxmas"
2020	Filthy Rich	"Romans 12:21"
2021	Genius	"Aretha: Unforgettable"
2021	Fear the Walking Dead	"Reclamation"
2021–2025	Yellowjackets	2 episodes
2022	The Endgame	"Gold Rush"
2022	A Million Little Things	"Lesson Learned"
2022	Tom Swift	"...And the Benefits of Bondage"
2022	Vampire Academy	"Pilot"
2023	Will Trent	"Pterodactyls Can Fly"
2024	Bridgerton	2 episodes
2024	Grey's Anatomy	"Night Moves"
2025	Watson	"The Camgirl Injury"
2025	Elsbeth	"Four Body Problem"
2025	Devil in Disguise: John Wayne Gacy	2 episodes
