= A Fork in the Road (song) =

1965 Motown song recorded by The Miracles

- Dutch release picture sleeve

Single by The Miracles

from the album Going to a Go-Go
- A-side: "The Tracks of My Tears"
- Released: June 23, 1965
- Recorded: May 5, 1965
- Genre: R&B
- Label: Motown Records Tamla 54118
- Songwriter(s): Smokey Robinson, Pete Moore, and Ronnie White
- Producer(s): Smokey Robinson

The Miracles singles chronology
| "Ooo Baby Baby" (1965) | "The Tracks of My Tears" / "A Fork in the Road" (1965) | "My Girl Has Gone" (1965) |

"A Fork in the Road"

Single by Rebbie Jackson

from the album Centipede
- B-side: "Eternal Love"
- Released: January 20, 1985
- Recorded: 1984
- Genre: R&B
- Label: Columbia
- Songwriter(s): Smokey Robinson, Pete Moore, and Ronnie White
- Producer(s): Wayne Henderson

Rebbie Jackson singles chronology
| "Centipede" (1984) | "A Fork in the Road" (1985) | "Reaction" (1986) |

"A Fork in the Road" is a 1965 Motown song recorded by American R&B singing group The Miracles, and written by Miracles members Smokey Robinson, Pete Moore, and Ronnie White, on Motown Records' Tamla subsidiary label. (T54118) This song was included as the closing track on the Miracles' 1965 studio LP, Going to a Go-Go, and was also released as the B-side of their million-selling Grammy Hall of Fame hit single, "The Tracks of My Tears". Though this original version never charted nationally, it was a strong regional hit in many areas of the country and a popular part of the Miracles' live show. Cash Box described it as a "tradition-oriented emotion-packed moody blueser."

Nineteen years later, American singer Rebbie Jackson recorded the song for her debut album, Centipede. Jackson's version was released as a single, and peaked at number 40 on the R&B chart.

The Miracles' 2002 CD re-release of the Going To A Go Go/Away We A Go Go albums features a never-before released live version of "A Fork in the Road", delivered to an enthusiastic audience response.

== Personnel ==
=== The Miracles ===
- Lead vocals - Smokey Robinson
- Background vocals- Claudette Rogers Robinson
- Background vocals- Pete Moore
- Background vocals- Ronnie White
- Background vocals- Bobby Rogers
- Guitar- Marv Tarplin

=== Other personnel ===
- Other instrumentation by The Funk Brothers
