= Yours Faithfully =

Studio album by Rebbie Jackson
- Released: March 30, 1998
- Recorded: 1997–1998
- Genres: R&B; pop; jazz
- Length: 50:42
- Labels: MJJ Music; Epic; Work
- Producers: Michael Jackson (also exec.); Eliot Kennedy; Pam Sheyne; Antonina Armato; Bruce Kramer (exec.); Jerry Greenberg (exec.); Ken Komisar (exec.)

Rebbie Jackson chronology
The Rebbie Jackson Collection (1996)	Yours Faithfully (1998)

Singles from Yours Faithfully
- 1. "Yours Faithfully" Released: February 17, 1998; 2. "You Take Me Places" Released: April 3, 1998

Yours Faithfully is the fourth studio album by American R&B singer Rebbie Jackson, released on March 30, 1998 through her brother, Michael's label, MJJ Music, through Epic Records in Europe and Japan, and Work in North America. It was preceded by the release of the single of the same name. "Centipede", originally released in 1984, was included as the album's closing track.

== Background ==
After seven years of inactivity, Jackson returned to music with a cover of "Forever Young" for the Free Willy 2: The Adventure Home soundtrack before signing with MJJ Music in 1997, a label operated by her brother Michael. She received a major boost from Michael, who assisted in the production of the album, and provided backing vocals on the track "Fly Away," which Michael had previously recorded for himself in 1987 for his album Bad, but it did not make the final cut. The album featured a number of producers some of whom included Michael, Eliot Kennedy, Bryan Loren, Keith Thomas, Antonina Armato.

== Singles and re-release of "Centipede" ==
Jackson's 1984 single "Centipede" also appeared on the album in its original extended version, as well as the singles "Yours Faithfully" and "You Take Me Places." The title track peaked at number forty on the Billboard R&B chart. The album also includes "I Don't Want to Lose You", a duet with R&B group Men of Vizion, who were also signed to the same label.

== Covers ==
"Baby, I'm in Heaven" was originally co-written and performed by R&B singer Trey Lorenz on his 1992 eponymous debut album. It was to be recorded by the late Tejano singer Selena for the album Dreaming of You. Jackson included the song as a tribute to Selena following her murder in March 1995.

"Koo Koo" was covered in 1998 by female R&B group N-TYCE.

The aforementioned "I Don't Want to Lose You" is a cover of The Spinners' song from their 1975 album Pick of the Litter.

"Fly Away" was originally recorded by her brother Michael Jackson for his seventh studio album Bad (1987). His version appears on the 2001 "Special Edition" and 25th anniversary editions of the album (2012).

== Reviews ==
Professional ratings
Review scores
Source	Rating
Allmusic	3/5 stars

The album garnered a generally favourable review from AllMusic which said: "Rebbie has never had a terrific voice, but she has surrounded herself with talented producers who help make Yours Faithfully one of the strongest albums in her catalog."

== Track listing ==
1. "What You Need" (Bryan Loren) – 4:30
2. "Play Your Game" (Bryan Loren) – 4:41
3. "Yours Faithfully" (Eliot Kennedy, Pam Sheyne) – 3:51
4. "Get Back to You" (Ian Green, Michelle Lewis) – 4:00
5. "I Don't Want to Lose You" (duet with Men of Vizion) (Linda Creed, Thom Bell) – 4:36
6. "Fly Away" (Michael Jackson) – 4:45
7. "You Take Me Places" (Gary Taylor) – 4:48
8. "Once in a Lifetime Love" (Deborah Cooper, Butch Jackson, James Preston, David Shaw) – 4:05
9. "Baby, I'm in Heaven" (Keith Thomas, Trey Lorenz) – 4:33
10. "Koo Koo" (Antonina Armato, David Frank) – 4:16
11. "Centipede" (Michael Jackson) – 5:55

== Charts ==
Chart (1998)	Peak position
US Billboard 200	50
US Top R&B/Hip-Hop Albums (Billboard)	38
