= You're the One (Dondria song) =

Single by Dondria

from the album Dondria vs. Phatfffat
- Released: November 24, 2009
- Recorded: 2009
- Genre: R&B, soul
- Length: 2:51
- Label: So So Def/Def Jam
- Songwriters: Bryan-Michael Cox, Jermaine Dupri
- Producers: Jermaine Dupri, Bryan-Michael Cox

Dondria singles chronology
| "You're the One" (2009) | "Shawty Wus Up" (2010) |

"You're the One" is a song by American singer Dondria. It is the lead single from her debut album Dondria vs. Phatfffat. The song peaked at number 14 on the Billboard Hot R&B/Hip-Hop Songs chart.

== Music video ==
The music video for "You're the One" premiered on March 22, 2010 and was directed by G. Visuals.

== Charts ==
| Chart (2009) | Peak position |
|---|---|
| U.S. Billboard Hot R&B/Hip-Hop Songs | 14 |
