= Un dì, felice, eterea =

Duet from the opera La traviata by Giuseppe Verdi

"Un dì, felice, eterea" ("One day, happy, ethereal") is a duet from the first act of Giuseppe Verdi's 1853 opera La traviata. It is sung by the male and female protagonists of the opera, Alfredo (a tenor) and Violetta (a soprano). The main melody of the duet, which is very famous in its own right, is also an important musical theme throughout the opera.

== Libretto ==
Alfredo
Un dì, felice, eterea,
Mi balenaste innante,
E da quel dì tremante,
Vissi d'ignoto amor.
Di quell'amor, quell'amor ch'è palpito
Dell'universo, Dell'universo intero,
Misterioso, Misterioso altero,
Croce, croce e delizia,
Croce e delizia, delizia al cor.

Violetta
Ah, se ciò è ver, fuggitemi,
Solo amistade io v'offro:
Amar non so, nè soffro
Un così eroico amor.
Io sono franca, ingenua;
Altra cercar dovete;
Non arduo troverete
Dimenticarmi allor.

One day, you, happy, ethereal,
appeared in front of me,
and ever since, trembling,
I lived with unknown love.
That love that's the
pulse of the universe, the whole universe,
Mysterious, mysterious and proud,
torture, torture and delight
torture and delight, delight to the heart.

If that is true, forget me.
Friendship is all I can offer.
I don't know how to love.
Nor can I suffer such great love.
I'm being honest with you, sincere.
You should find somebody else.
Then you wouldn't find it hard
to forget me.
