= Dondria vs. Phatfffat =

Studio album by Dondria
- Released: August 17, 2010
- Genre: R&B
- Length: 38:26
- Labels: So So Def, Malaco, Sony Orchard
- Producers: Jermaine Dupri, Johntá Austin, Bryan-Michael Cox

Singles from Dondria vs. Phatfffat
- 1. "You're the One" Released: November 24, 2009; 2. "Shawty Wus Up" Released: May 18, 2010; 3. "Where Did We Go Wrong" Released: June 29, 2010

Dondria vs. Phatfffat is the debut studio album of American R&B singer Dondria, released on August 17, 2010, by So So Def Recordings.

== Singles ==
The first single was "You're the One", released on November 24, 2009. It peaked at number 14 on the U.S. Billboard Hot R&B/Hip-Hop Songs.

The second single, "Shawty Wus Up" was released May 18, 2010 and peaked at 66 on the Billboard Hot R&B/Hip-Hop Songs.

The third single, "Where Did We Go Wrong" was released June 29, 2010 and peaked at 72 on the Billboard Hot R&B/Hip-Hop Songs.

== Critical reception ==
Allmusic's David Jeffries gave the album three-and-a-half out of five stars and called it a "pleasing throwback" to late-1990s R&B, stating "Dondria is vocally a dead ringer for Beyoncé but her material recalls the late ‘90s, 'one-namers' like Brandy, Monifah, and Monica". Despite writing that the album "lacks progression on the production side", Shirea L. Carroll of Essence complimented Dondria's vocals and R&B sound, while noting "few misses" lyrically. Mark Edward Nero of About.com gave the album three out of five stars and viewed its lyrics as "bland", but commended Dondria's performance on "ballads and faster-paced tracks" and commented that "despite its problems, the album is a nice showcasing of a raw, but talented newcomer".

== Track listing ==
1. "You're the One" - 2:52
2. "Saving Myself" - 2:38
3. "Shawty Wus Up" (featuring Johntá Austin & Diamond) - 4:01
4. "Making Love" - 3:17
5. "Can You Help Me" - 4:12
6. "Where Did We Go Wrong" - 4:01
7. "No More" - 3:43
8. "Still Be With Me" - 4:10
9. "You're the One (JD's Jeep Mix)" - 3:13
10. "Believer" - 3:34
11. "Kissed By The Sun" - 2:56

== Personnel ==
Credits for Dondria vs. Phatfffat adapted from Allmusic.

- Johnta Austin – Composer
- Steven Barlow – Engineer, Assistant
- Saisha Beechum – Make-Up
- Derek Blanks – Art Direction, Design, Photography
- Marcus John Bryant – Composer
- Jimmie Cameron – Composer
- Vella Maria Cameron – Composer
- Brittany Carpentero – Composer
- George Clinton – Composer
- Bryan-Michael Cox – Composer, Producer
- Cristyle – Vocal Arrangement
- Dondria – Composer
- Jermaine Dupri – Composer, Producer, Executive Producer, Mixing, Remix Producer
- Leigh Elliott – Composer
- Karen Freer – Cello
- Wes Funderburk – Trombone
- The Funderhorns – Horn
- Kenneth Gamble – Composer
- Joe Gransden – Trumpet
- John Horesco – IV Engineer
- Eddie Horst – String Arrangements
- Josh Houghkirk – Assistant
- Kegan Houston – Assistant
- Leon Huff – Composer
- Curtis Jackson – Composer
- LaMarquis Jefferson – Bass
- Joe the Butcher – Mixing
- Crystal Johnson – Composer
- Justin Bruns – Violin
- Kenn Wagner – Violin
- Ced Keyz – Producer
- Daniel Laufer – Cello
- Damien Lewis – Assistant
- Lee Major – Producer
- Connie McKendrick – Composer
- Dania Miller – Hair Stylist
- Johnny Mollings – Composer
- Lenny Mollins – Composer
- Tyler Nicolo – Mixing
- Carlos Oyanedel – Assistant
- Herb Powers – Mastering
- William Pu – Violin
- Christopher Pulgram – Violin
- April Roomet – Stylist
- William Scruggs – Saxophone
- Sheela Iyengar – Violin
- Olga Shpitko – Violin
- Nakisha Smith – Composer
- Brian Stanley – Mixing
- Sou-Chun Su – Violin
- Phil Tan – Mixing
- Cedric Williams – Composer
