= Dondria =

American R&B singer

Dondria Nicole
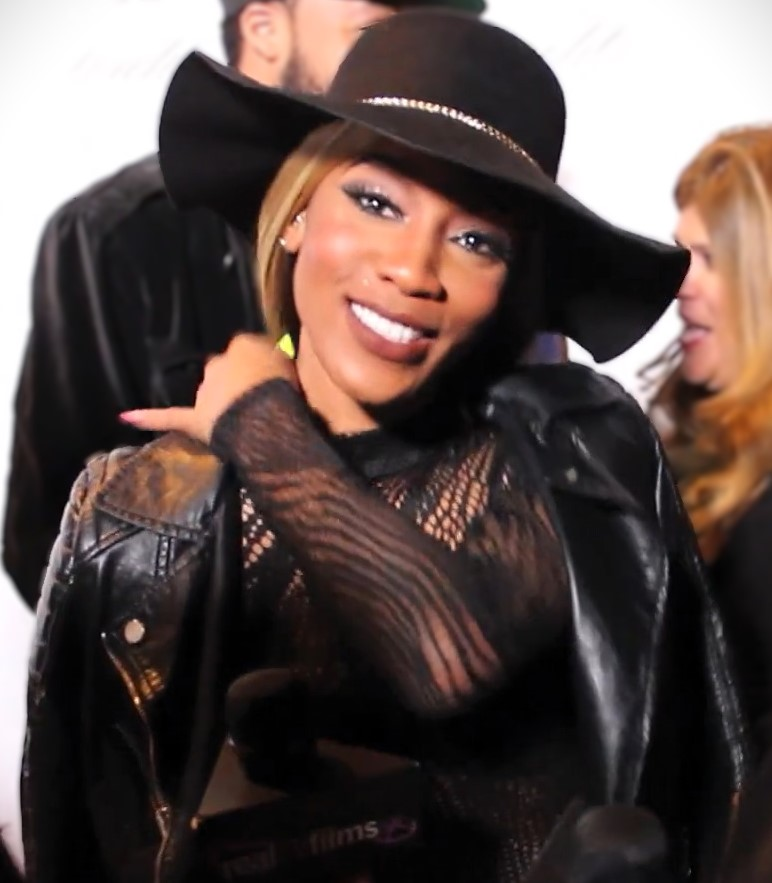
- Dondria in 2016

Background information
- Also known as: Phatfffat
- Born: Dondria Nicole Fields; January 6, 1987 (age 39); Dover, Oklahoma, U.S.
- Origin: Sachse, Texas, U.S.
- Genres: R&B; soul
- Occupations: Singer; songwriter
- Years active: 2006–present
- Labels: E1; So So Def; Def Jam; Island Records
- Website: dondrianicole.com

Dondria Nicole Fields (born January 6, 1987), known mononymously as Dondria, is an American R&B singer. She is best known for her 2009 single "You're the One", which peaked at number six on the Bubbling Under Hot 100 chart. The song preceded her debut studio album Dondria vs. Phatfffat (2010), which was released by So Do Def and Geffen Records, and peaked at number 51 on the Billboard 200.

== Biography ==
=== Early life and career beginnings ===
Dondria was discovered on YouTube by So So Def founder Jermaine Dupri. She was born in Dover, Oklahoma, and raised in Sachse, Texas. Dondria began singing at a young age in her church choir after her friend David Baker asked her to join with him. In 2006 at the age of 19, she created a YouTube channel using the username "Phatfffat" to showcase her singing talent. With YouTube she built a sizable following online, and eventually she was contacted by Dupri via a YouTube Message. Although it took several messages before she responded, when she did she was flown to Atlanta to meet Dupri and he offered her a recording contract with So So Def Recordings and she agreed with Dupri and signed her in 2007. Originally she was asked to record a song with R&B group Jagged Edge, but eventually was offered a solo contract.

=== 2008–10: Dondria Vs. Phatfffat ===
Dondria released a buzz single for her debut album, titled "Can't Stop" on June 17, 2008. It originally was known to be her first single, but was only used as promotion for the project. She also was featured on a song titled "Like This" by Bow Wow, which was included on his 2009 studio album New Jack City, II. Dondria released a mixtape for fans, titled "Dondria Duets" on November 6, 2009. The Mixtape was available for download on Global14.com, for free. She recorded popular male R&B songs that included verses by herself, turning them into duets. The Mixtape was released to promote, Dondria's single You're The One which dropped a few weeks later.

Her debut album, titled Dondria Vs. Phatfffat, was released on August 17, 2010. It debuted at No. 43, with first week sales of 422, which is notable since she was discovered off YouTube. The official debut single for her album "You're The One" was released on November 23, 2009. The single debuted on Billboard Hot R&B/Hip-Hop Songs charts at No. 100 and peaked at No. 14. It's also charted at No. 21 on the Christian Songs chart the single has reached at No. 70 on the radio songs. It is now a No. 10 on Heetseekers Chart. The video has peaked at No. 1 on 106 & Park. Her second single was titled "Shawty Wus Up" which features label-mate Johnta Austin and Diamond. Dondria toured as the opening act on Trey Songz and Monica's "Passion Pain & Pleasure" Tour. The tour began on August 6, 2010, in Shreveport, Louisiana. On August 4, 2010, "Makin Love" from Dondria's debut album leaked to the Internet, getting overall good reviews from fans. "Where Did We Go Wrong," a song from the album co-written by Dondria, was to be the album's third single. It was never officially released, but it did make the R&B charts.

=== 2011–2016: Second studio album, Dondria Duets 2 and 3 ===
On June 3, 2011, "Boiling Points" was confirmed by Dondria to be an upcoming single on her Tumblr Blog. The original song featuring Jermaine Dupri first appeared on her "Dondria Duets 2", Mixtape. It is unclear if the record will be released as a mixtape single, or the first offering from a brand new studio album. Currently, Dondria is in the studio recording songs for her upcoming second album. She also just dropped remixes of Miguel's "Quickie", Drake's "Headlines" and Maroon 5's "Make Moves Like Jagger". She has maintained a YouTube fan base of more than 120,000 subscribers.

Dondria originally planned to release a 3rd edition to her "Dondria Duets" mixtape series, entitled "Dondria Duets III: 90s Edition" on January 6, 2012, her 25th birthday; however, it was delayed. The mixtape was instead to be released on February 1, 2012. In a YouTube video of the making of the "Dondria Duets III: 90's Edition" mixtape, Jermaine Dupri revealed it would the final installment to the series, however Dondria would do an official duet album to be released as her third studio album. The album would include all new original duet recordings. "Dondria Duets III: 90s Edition" was released online via Global14.com on February 1, 2012. Also confirmed on this date was information regarding he first official single from Dondria's second album. Rapup.com reported the single will be a track entitled "Ol School Love", and featuring Da Brat.

=== 2017–present: Dondria Duets 4 &5, EP: The Day of the Don, EP: A Tale of Hearts ===
On July 4, 2017, Dondria released her first original body of work since her debut album, "Dondria Vs. Phatfffat". The EP, entitled "The Day of The Don" embodied 6 songs covering ebbs and flows of a relationship. The EP was received well and showcased more of Dondria's writing ability. She co-wrote with ShaSha Jones, Derrick "D-Mac" Mckenzie, The Penhouse, Bryan-Michael Cox, Nikki, Songwriter Pendrick, and Yonni.

On February 14, 2018, Dondria dropped an unannounced "Dondria Duets 4" Mixtape as a token of appreciation to her fans for Valentine's Day. The mixtape feat remixes of hits like Chris Brown's "To My Bed, Dvsn's "Too Deep", and Bruno Mars' "That's What I Like". It had been 6 years since the last installment of the Dondria Duet series so her fans were definitely in for a treat.

Dondria later dropped another EP on November 9, 2018, called "A Tale of Hearts". This was a complete duet project with childhood friend and Youtube partner in crime, Corey "Broadway" Stevenson. The EP was produced by Patrick Carpenter of First Kontact Music Group and pleased all of the duo's fans that had been watching them for years and we were wondering what happened to their bond.

On January 15, 2021, Dondria released her single "Let It Be," produced by Bryan-Michael Cox. She co-wrote the song with John Bias.

== Discography ==
=== Studio albums ===
Title	Album details	Peak chart positions	
Title	Album details	US	US R&B
Dondria vs. Phatfffat	Released: August 17, 2010; Label: So So Def/Geffen; Formats: CD, digital download	51	9

=== EPs ===
- The Day of The Don (2017)
- A Tale of Hearts [with Broadway] (2018)
- Perspective (2023)
- Back to Love (2025)

=== Mixtapes ===
- Dondria Duets (2009)
- Dondria Duets 2 (2011)
- Dondria Duets 3: 90s Edition (2012)
- Dondria Duets 4 (2018)
- Dondria Duets 5: The 90's Edition II (2019)

=== Singles ===
Year	Title	Chart positions			Album
Year	Title	US	US R&B	US Christ	Album
2008	"Can't Stop"	—	—	—	Non-album single
2010	"You're the One"	106	14	21	Dondria vs. Phatfffat
2010	"Shawty Wus Up" (featuring Johntá Austin & Diamond)	—	66	—	Dondria vs. Phatfffat
2010	"Where Did We Go Wrong"	—	72	—	Dondria vs. Phatfffat
2018	"Crush" (with Broadway)	—	—	—	A Tale of Hearts
2019	"Take You There"	—	—	—	Perspective
2021	"Let It Be"	—	—	—	Perspective
2022	"Him"	—	—	—	Perspective
2022	"Good Company"	—	—	—	Perspective
2023	"Good Company (Girl's Night)" (feat. Zonnique & Natasha Mosley)	—	—	—	Non-album single
2024	"That's My Mama"	—	—	—	Non-album single
2025	"Closest I've Been"	—	—	—	Back to Love
2025	"Give It All" (feat. J.Howell)	—	—	—	Back to Love

== Guest appearances ==
List of non-single guest appearances, with other performing artists, showing year released and album name
Title	Year	Other artist(s)	Album
"Like This"	2009	Bow Wow	New Jack City II
"Not Mine"	2012	Willie Taylor	The Reintroduction Of Willie Taylor
"Celebration" (Remix)	2013	Jermaine Dupri, Jagged Edge, Da Brat, Bow Wow, Fresco Kane	

== Tours ==
=== As supporting act ===
- 2010: Trey Songz and Monica (Passion Pain & Pleasure Tour)
