= Yesterday (Toni Braxton song) =

Single by Toni Braxton

from the album Pulse
- Released: September 29, 2009
- Studio: Side 3 Studios (Denver, CO); Paramount Studios (Los Angeles, CA); Mason Sound Studios (North Hollywood, CA)
- Length: 3:48
- Label: Atlantic
- Songwriters: Jerome Armstrong; Terrence Battle; Toni Braxton; Justin Franks; Michael White
- Producer: DJ Frank E

Toni Braxton singles chronology
"The Time of Our Lives" (2006)	"Yesterday" (2009)	"Hands Tied" (2010)

"Yesterday" is a song by American R&B singer Toni Braxton. It was written by Braxton, Jerome Armstrong, Terrence Battle, Michael White, and DJ Frank E and produced by the latter for her seventh studio album Pulse (2010). Selected as the album's lead single, it was released by Atlantic Records to US radios on September 29, 2009. American singer Trey Songz appears on the Troy Taylor radio edit of "Yesterday," which served as the American version released to radio. Outside North America, the original version of the song was released, which features only Braxton's vocals.

The song was a moderate success on Billboard's Hot R&B/Hip-Hop Songs and peaked at number twelve. In the United Kingdom, the song debuted at number 50 on the Official UK Singles top 100 Chart and at number 17 on R&B Singles top 40.

== Background and release ==
The song was released on Braxton's official website on September 29, 2009, after four years in hiatus. It is Braxton's first single released under Atlantic Records. In the United Kingdom, the song was supposed to be released on February 22, 2010, but ultimately the single release date was moved to May 3, 2010. "Yesterday" is Braxton's first single release in the UK since "Hit the Freeway" in 2003, as Libra was only available on import and no singles from the album were released there. A Spanish version of the track, titled "Ayer", was recorded with Alexander Acha but remains unreleased to this day.

== Promotion ==
Braxton's promotion of the track commenced at the Soul Train Music Awards of 2009, along with Songz. Braxton also promoted the single in the UK with performances on GMTV on 11 May 2010, Loose Women and The David Dickinson Show on 18 May 2010.

== Critical reception ==
The song received positive reviews from music critics. Nick Levine from Digital Spy rated the song 3 out of 5 stars and favorably reviewed the solo version of the song, saying: "'Yesterday' shares a little too much of its DNA with Beyoncé's 'Halo' to satisfy fully, but [Braxton] sounds as seductive as ever crooning the surprisingly bitter lyrics - ("I don't love you, don't need you, can't stand you,") she insists on the middle 8. In fact, when she growls those last three words, it's almost like she never went away. Mark Edward Nero from About.com say, positively, "Arguably the best song on Pulse is the passionately bitter break-up song 'Yesterday', but interestingly, the better of two versions of the song isn't included on the album's standard version". Andy Kellman from Allmusic said: "'Yesterday' is a bitter breakup ballad in which the teeth-clenched 'I don’t love ya/Don’t need ya/Can’t stand ya no more' sounds very real". Mikael Wood from Los Angeles Times said: "Opener 'Yesterday' cribs its twinkly emo-soul texture (and some of its airy vocal melody) from Beyoncé's 'Broken-Hearted Girl'".

== Chart performance ==
"Yesterday" debuted at number 96 on the U.S. Billboard Hot R&B/Hip-Hop Songs chart. On the issue dated January 2, 2010, the song made a massive 39-spot jump and has now peaked at number twelve, making it her highest chart performance since her 2000 single "Just Be a Man About It", which peaked at number six. In the UK, "Yesterday" became Braxton's first hit single since the release of "Hit the Freeway", peaking at number 50 on the UK Singles Chart and at number seventeen on the UK R&B Singles Chart.

== Music video ==
There are two versions of the music video for "Yesterday": one for the original solo version and one for the remix featuring Trey Songz. Filming the video for the single started on October 8, 2009, in Los Angeles with director Bille Woodruff (known for such classic Braxton videos as "Un-Break My Heart" and "He Wasn't Man Enough"). Photos from the video were revealed on her official website on October 28 and show Braxton playing a piano, and Songz playing her boyfriend. The video premiered on The Wendy Williams Show on November 20, 2009. The video features singer Brooke Hogan as well as basketball players Shannon Brown and Ron Artest from the Los Angeles Lakers. The video tells the story about a woman (Braxton) who discovers that her boyfriend (Brown) is cheating on her with another woman (Hogan).

== Formats and track listings ==
U.S. iTunes digital EP

1. "Yesterday" (Remix featuring Trey Songz) — 3:46
2. "Yesterday" (Album Version) — 3:48
3. "Yesterday" (Instrumental) — 3:48

U.S. Wal-Mart CD single

1. "Yesterday" (Remix featuring Trey Songz) — 3:46
2. "Rewind" — 3:30

German digital single

1. "Yesterday" (Album Version) — 3:48
2. "Yesterday" (Bimbo Jones Mix) — 7:05
3. "Yesterday" (Fred Falke Mix) — 7:02
4. "Yesterday" (Dave Audé Club Mix) - 8:41
5. "Yesterday" (Remix featuring Trey Songz) — 3:46
6. "Yesterday" (Video) — 3:47

German CD single

1. "Yesterday" (Album Version) — 3:48
2. "Yesterday" (Remix featuring Trey Songz) — 3:46

UK digital single

1. "Yesterday" (Album Version) — 3:48

UK iTunes digital single

1. "Yesterday" (Album Version) — 3:48
2. "Rewind" — 3:30

UK iTunes digital remix single

1. "Yesterday" (Bimbo Jones Mix) — 7:05
2. "Yesterday" (Fred Falke Mix) — 7:02
3. "Yesterday" (Nu Addiction Mix) — 6:04
4. "Yesterday" (Sticky Lovers Remix) — 4:58
5. "Yesterday" (Remix featuring Trey Songz) — 3:46

UK 7Digital digital single

1. "Yesterday" (Album Version) — 3:48
2. "Yesterday" (Cutmore Mix) — 6:18

UK 7" Vinyl

1. "Yesterday" (Sticky Lovers Remix) — 4:58
2. "Yesterday" (Sticky Lovers Dub Mix) — 4:58

== Charts ==
=== Weekly charts ===
Weekly chart performance for "Yesterday"
Chart (2009–10)	Peak position
Austria (Ö3 Austria Top 40)	49
CIS Airplay (TopHit)	48
European Hot 100 Singles (Billboard)	50
Germany (GfK)	20
Japan (Japan Hot 100)	100
Russia Airplay (TopHit)	44
Scotland Singles (OCC)	73
Switzerland (Schweizer Hitparade)	17
UK Singles (OCC)	50
UK Hip Hop/R&B (OCC)	17
US Adult R&B Songs (Billboard)	11
US Bubbling Under Hot 100 (Billboard)	16
US Hot R&B/Hip-Hop Songs (Billboard)	12

=== Year-end charts ===
Year-end chart performance for "Yesterday"
Chart (2010)	Position
Russia Airplay (TopHit)	55
US Adult R&B Songs (Billboard)	41

== Release history ==
Release history and formats for "Yesterday"
Region	Date	Format(s)	Label
United States	September 29, 2009	Radio airplay	Atlantic Records
United States	December 8, 2009	Digital download	Atlantic Records
United States	December 15, 2009	CD single (Wal-Mart)	Atlantic Records
United Kingdom	May 2, 2010	Digital download	Atlantic Records
United Kingdom	May 3, 2010	7" vinyl	Atlantic Records
Germany	May 7, 2010	CD single; digital download	Atlantic Records
