= Shawty Wus Up =

Single by Dondria featuring Johntá Austin and Diamond

from the album Dondria vs. Phatfffat
- Released: May 18, 2010
- Recorded: 2010
- Genre: R&B, hip hop
- Length: 4:01
- Label: So So Def/Def Jam
- Songwriters: Johntá Austin, Brittany Carpenter, Jermaine Dupri
- Producer: Jermaine Dupri

Dondria featuring Johntá Austin and Diamond singles chronology
"You're the One" (2009)	"Shawty Wus Up" (2010)	"Where Did We Go Wrong" (2010)

"Shawty Wus Up" is a song by American singer Dondria. The song features Johntá Austin and Diamond. It is the second single from her debut album Dondria vs. Phatfffat. The song peaked at number 66 on the Billboard Hot R&B/Hip-Hop Songs chart.

== Music video ==
The music video for "Shawty Wus Up" was released on July 18, 2010.

== Charts ==
Chart (2010)	Peak position
U.S. Billboard Hot R&B/Hip-Hop Songs	66
