= Make My Heart =

Single by Toni Braxton

from the album Pulse
- Released: February 23, 2010
- Recorded: 2009
- Studio: Record Plant (Los Angeles, CA); Mux Music Studios (London, UK)
- Genre: R&B; dance; electronic
- Length: 3:21
- Label: Atlantic
- Songwriters: Lucas Secon; Makeba Riddick; Joseph Freeman; Aubreya Gravatt; Theodore Life, Jr.
- Producer: Lucas Secon

Toni Braxton singles chronology
"Hands Tied" (2010)	"Make My Heart" (2010)	"I Heart You" (2012)

"Make My Heart" is a song by American singer Toni Braxton. It contains an interpolation from "We're Going to a Party" (1977) by Evelyn "Champagne" King. Written by Lucas Secon, Makeba Riddick, Joseph Freeman, Aubreya Gravatt, Theodore Life, Jr. and produced by Lucas Secon for Braxton's sixth studio album Pulse (2010), it was released on February 23, 2010 as the album's third and final single.

== Critical reception ==
In a review of the album Pulse BBC.co.uk stated "The brass-infused Make My Heart sees Braxton singing higher than her comfortable range, and Lookin’ At Me draws too obviously on Beyoncé's Halo, feeling similarly redundant for its too-high vocal and artificially-placed focus on young lust. These poppier tracks feel gratuitous, thrown in for measure to attract the younger crowd." AllMusic's Andy Kellman described the song as "a rapturous club track put over the top by some of Braxton’s most athletic vocals."

== Release and promotion ==
"Make My Heart" was released on February 23, 2010 to iTunes. That same day, two remix EPs were released to promote the song.

Braxton performed "Make My Heart" on The Wendy Williams Show on February 11, 2010 and The Ellen DeGeneres Show on April 27, 2010.

== Music video ==
The music video for "Make My Heart" was directed by Bille Woodruff and shot back-to-back with the video for "Hands Tied," also directed by Woodruff. It was premiered on April 13, 2010. Braxton's sisters Towanda Braxton, Tamar Braxton, Traci Braxton, and Trina Braxton make cameo appearances in the video.

== Track listings ==
- Digital download
1. "Make My Heart" – 3:27
- Digital download (Remixes, Pt. 1)
1. "Make My Heart" (Dario Caminita & Andrea Corelli Radio Edit) – 3:28
2. "Make My Heart" (Dario Caminita & Andrea Corelli Remix) – 7:04
3. "Make My Heart" (Dario Caminita & Andrea Corelli Dub Trip) – 7:29
4. "Make My Heart" (Justin Michael & Kemal Radio Mix) – 3:26
5. "Make My Heart" (Justin Michael & Kemal Remix) – 6:37
6. "Make My Heart" (Chris Malinchak Remix) – 3:26
7. "Make My Heart" (Aqua Diva Radio Edit) – 3:08
8. "Make My Heart" (Aqua Diva Vocal Mix) – 5:55
9. "Make My Heart" (Aqua Diva Dub) – 5:54
10. "Make My Heart" (Anthony Louis & Andrea Monta Club Remix) – 5:36
11. "Make My Heart" (DJ Kharma Radio Edit) – 3:52
12. "Make My Heart" (DJ Kharma Extended Mix 1) – 6:46
- Digital download (Remixes, Pt. 2)
1. "Make My Heart" (Kim Fai Remix) – 6:53
2. "Make My Heart" (Norman Doray Olympic Remix) – 8:37
3. "Make My Heart" (Norman Doray Olympic Dub) – 8:38
4. "Make My Heart" (Behrouz Club Mix) – 6:39
5. "Make My Heart" (Hagenaar & Albrecht Vocal Mix) – 7:18
6. "Make My Heart" (Hagenaar & Albrecht Dub) – 7:17
7. "Make My Heart" (Stereo Palma Vocal Club Mix) – 7:07
8. "Make My Heart" (Stereo Palma Dub) – 7:04
9. "Make My Heart" (Siege Vocal Mix) – 6:11
10. "Make My Heart" (Siege Dub) – 6:11

== Credits and personnel ==
Credits adapted from Pulse liner notes.

Song credits

- Writing – Aubrey A. Gravatt, Joseph Wayne Freeman, Lucas Secon, Makeba Riddick, Theodore Life, Jr.
- Producer, Backing Vocals, Programmed By, Keyboards, Drums, Arranged By – Lucas Secon
- Backing vocals – Makeba Riddick, Tamar Braxton, Toni Braxton
- Keyboards [Additional] – Don E

Sample credits

- "Make My Heart" contains an interpolation from "We're Going to a Party" (1977) performed by Evelyn "Champagne" King.

== Charts ==
Chart (2010)	Peak position
CIS Airplay (TopHit)	191
US Bubbling Under R&B/Hip-Hop Songs (Billboard)	22
