= Yours Faithfully (song) =

Single by Rebbie Jackson

from the album Yours Faithfully
- Released: February 17, 1998
- Recorded: 1997
- Genre: R&B
- Label: MJJ Music; Sony
- Songwriters: Eliot Kennedy; Pam Sheyne
- Producers: Eliot Kennedy; Pam Sheyne

Rebbie Jackson singles chronology
"2300 Jackson Street" (1989)	"Yours Faithfully" (1998)	"You Take Me Places" (1998)

Music video
- "Yours Faithfully" on YouTube

"Yours Faithfully" is a song by American singer Rebbie Jackson. A mid-tempo R&B jam written and produced by Eliot Kennedy and Pam Sheyne, it is the title track from her fourth album Yours Faithfully and it was released as its first single.

Making a comeback to the music scene after nearly 10 years, Jackson signed to her brother Michael's label MJJ Music, which released the album and the single at the beginning of 1998.

Despite Jackson promoting the release in the United States and Europe, and receiving mostly favourable reviews, the single failed to have much success, peaking at number 40 in the US R&B charts, and number 76 in the UK charts, this being Jackson's only chart entry in the UK.

In the UK, the single was released as a two-part CD. The b-side was the original extended version of Jackson's 1984 hit "Centipede".

== Reception ==
A review in Billboard magazine called "Yours faithfully" a "finger-snappin' R&B shuffler", noting that her vocal delivery has become "notably more relaxed and playful" since her 1984 hit "Centipede". Reviewer Larry Flick goes on to comment that "The groove is a little docile...but the chorus seeps into the brain after a couple of spins".

== Versions ==
- Album Version (4:33)
- C&J Single Version (4:06)
- Stonebridge Mix (3:45)
- Candy Hill House Remix (6:30)

8, the music video directed by Bille Woodruff for the song was filmed, which is Jackson's fourth and last videoclip.

== Charts ==
Chart (1998)	Peak position
Billboard Hot R&B/Hip-Hop Songs	40
UK Singles Chart	76
