= You Send the Rain Away =

Single by Rebbie Jackson with Robin Zander

from the album Reaction
- B-side: "If You Don't Call (You Don't Care)"
- Released: December 1986
- Genre: R&B
- Length: 4:04
- Label: Columbia
- Songwriters: Preston Glass, Gloria Sklerov, Lenny Macaluso
- Producer: Reggie Lucas

Rebbie Jackson with Robin Zander singles chronology
"Reaction" (1986)	"You Send the Rain Away" (1986)	"Plaything" (1988)

"You Send the Rain Away" is a song by the American singer Rebbie Jackson with Cheap Trick lead vocalist Robin Zander, released in 1986 as the second single from her second studio album Reaction. It was written by Preston Glass, Gloria Sklerov and Lenny Macaluso, and produced by Reggie Lucas. The song reached No. 50 on the Billboard Hot Black Singles Chart.

== Release ==
"You Send the Rain Away" was released by Columbia in America only on 7" and 12" vinyl. For its release as a single, the song was edited and cut by almost a minute in duration. The 7" single featured the B-side "If You Don't Call (You Don't Care)", which was taken from Reaction. The 12" vinyl featured the "Single Version" as the A-side and the "Album Version" as the B-side. A promotional 7" vinyl was also issued featuring the "Single Version" on both sides.

== Promotion ==
A music video was filmed to promote the single. It was produced by Carl Mazzocone and directed by Joe Layton.

== Critical reception ==
Upon release, Billboard described the song as a "gracefully solemn love duet in [an] unusual, cavernous mix; nice blend between the suave Jackson and the earnest Zander." Cash Box listed the single as one of their "feature picks" during December 1986. They commented: "The unlikely pairing of Jackson with Zander has produced a startingly fresh pop/R&B single. A lush melody and production form a perfect foundation for these two gifted voices."

Drum Publications (East Africa) highlighted the song as a "stand-out" from Reaction. Justin Kantor of AllMusic described Reaction as "the strongest of her '80s output", with the "sunny duet with Robin Zander one of the fine moments."

== Track listing ==
7" single

1. "You Send the Rain Away" - 4:04
2. "If You Don't Call (You Don't Care)" - 4:36

7" single (US promo)

1. "You Send the Rain Away" - 4:04
2. "You Send the Rain Away" - 4:04

12" single

1. "You Send the Rain Away (Single Version)" - 4:04
2. "You Send the Rain Away (Album Version)" - 4:59

== Charts ==
Chart (1987)	Peak position
US Hot Black Singles (Billboard)	50
