= Centipede (album) =

Studio album by Rebbie Jackson
- Released: October 10, 1984
- Recorded: 1984
- Genre: R&B; soul
- Length: 31:39
- Label: Columbia
- Producer: Michael Jackson; Wayne Henderson; Tito Jackson; Randy Jackson

Rebbie Jackson chronology
Centipede (1984)	Reaction (1986)

Singles from Centipede
- 1. "Centipede" Released: September 10, 1984; 2. "A Fork in the Road" Released: January 20, 1985

Professional ratings
Review scores
Source	Rating
AllMusic	3/5 stars

Centipede is the debut studio album by American singer Rebbie Jackson, released in the fall of 1984 by Columbia Records. It album spawned two top-forty Billboard Hot 100 charting hits, the most famous being the title track.

== Background ==
Despite having worked with her family on the Jacksons' variety TV show and having been a backing singer for the likes of Betty Wright in the late '70s, Jackson was the last Jackson family sibling to release an album at the age of 34, mostly due to wanting to raise her two young daughters, Stacee and Yashi, in a secure family environment, waiting until she felt they were old enough.

The recording of the album was a family affair, as her brother Michael Jackson wrote, produced and sang backing vocals on the title track. Brothers Marlon, Jackie, Tito and Randy co-wrote "Come Alive It's Saturday Night", with the latter two producing the song as well. Tito also co-wrote "Hey Boy" with his wife, the late Delores "Dee Dee" Martes. The rest of the album was produced by Wayne Henderson.

The album includes two covers, the Miracles' "A Fork in the Road" and Prince's "I Feel for You". Chaka Khan, who earned a #1 hit with her well-known cover of the latter song, released it as a single a mere week before Jackson's album was released.

== Commercial performance ==
Three singles were released from the album. The title track, "Centipede" was released as the lead single in September 1984 and eventually became Jackson's biggest hit and best known song, peaking at #4 on the Billboard R&B chart and at #24 on the Billboard Hot 100, becoming the artist's highest-charting hit on both charts to date. It eventually received a gold disc certification by the RIAA. The song also featured additional background vocals by the Weather Girls. The next two singles were released in early 1985, but failed to replicate the single's success, with the ballad "A Fork in the Road" peaking at #40 on the R&B chart, and the third and last single, a remixed version of "Play Me (I'm a Jukebox)" (co-written by country artist Pam Tillis) not charting at all.

The album itself had moderate success, peaking at #63 on the Billboard 200, and achieving a respectable #13 peak on the Top R&B/Hip Hop Albums chart. Again, they became the singer's highest chart positions on both charts to date.

Centipede was not released on the then-new CD format at the time, and remained out of print for several years. It received a limited first CD edition in 1999. On May 25, 2010, the album was reissued on CD, also containing Jackson's follow-up album, Reaction.

In September 2012, the album was reissued by label Funky Town Grooves, who specializes on reissuing 1980s R&B albums, with the inclusion of 7 bonus tracks, including the B-side "Eternal Love" and a previously unreleased track from those sessions co-written by her brothers Marlon, Jackie, Tito and Randy, titled "I'm Just Gonna Love You", as well as remixes.

Centipede is mentioned in the 2006 RuPaul song "Supermodel (El Lay Toya Jam)" from the album ReWorked.

== Track listing ==
No.	Title	Writer(s)	Producer(s)	Length
1.	"Centipede"	Michael Jackson	Michael Jackson	4:25
2.	"Come Alive It's Saturday Night"	Marlon Jackson, Jackie Jackson, Randy Jackson, Tito Jackson	Randy Jackson, Tito Jackson, Wayne Henderson	4:13
3.	"Hey Boy"	Tito Jackson, Delores Jackson, Michael McKinney	Henderson	4:38
4.	"Open Up to My Love"	Jon Springer, Don Daniels, Mary Stewart	Henderson	4:10
5.	"Play Me (I'm a Jukebox)"	Pam Tillis, Jan Buckingham	Henderson	3:27
6.	"I Feel for You"	Prince	Henderson	3:54
7.	"A Fork in the Road"	Smokey Robinson, Pete Moore, Ronnie White	Henderson	3:46
8.	"Ready for Love"	Frank Hamilton III	Henderson	3:00
Total length:				31:39

=== Expanded edition ===
Bonus tracks
No.	Title	Writer(s)	Producer(s)	Length
9.	"Eternal Love" (single version)	Hamilton	Henderson	3:46
10.	"I'm Just Gonna Love You" (previously unreleased)	Tito Jackson, Marlon Jackson, Jackie Jackson, Randy Jackson	Tito Jackson	4:08
11.	"Play Me (I'm a Jukebox)" (12" version)	Tillis, Buckingham	Henderson	5:48
12.	"Play Me (I'm a Jukebox)" (12" instrumental)	Tillis, Buckingham	Henderson	4:48
13.	"Come Alive It's Saturday Night" (extended mix)	Marlon Jackson, Jackie Jackson, Randy Jackson, Tito Jackson	Randy Jackson, Tito Jackson, Henderson	7:02
14.	"Centipede" (12" version)	Michael Jackson	Michael Jackson	5:58
15.	"Centipede" (12" instrumental)	Michael Jackson	Michael Jackson	5:55

== Personnel ==
- Rebbie Jackson - vocals
- David Williams, Charles Fearing - guitar
- Nathan East, Nathaniel Phillips - bass
- Frank "Rusty" Hamilton - Moog bass, keyboards, synthesizer
- Randy Jackson, Bobby Lyle, John Springer - keyboards
- Nick Johnson, John Barnes - synthesizer
- Mike Hightower - DMX programmer
- Leon "Ndugu" Chancler, Alvino Bennett - drums
- Jerry Hey - flugelhorn
- Michael Jackson, The Weather Girls (Izora Armstead, Martha Wash), Randy Jackson, Tito Jackson, Gwen Matthews, Marlena Jeter, Maxi Anderson, Garry Glenn, Patryce Banks, John Springer - backing vocals

== Charts ==
Chart (1984)	Peak position
US Billboard 200	63
US Top R&B/Hip-Hop Albums (Billboard)	13

== Certifications ==
Region	Certification	Sales
New Zealand	Gold	2,500
Australia	Gold	15,000
United States		350,000
