= Love, Marriage & Divorce =

Studio album by Toni Braxton and Babyface
- Released: February 4, 2014
- Recorded: 2013
- Studios: Brandon's Way Recording (Los Angeles County, California)
- Genres: R&B; pop; soul
- Length: 43:39
- Label: Motown
- Producers: Babyface; Antonio Dixon; The Rascals

Toni Braxton chronology
Pulse (2010)	Love, Marriage & Divorce (2014)	Braxton Family Christmas (2015)

Babyface chronology
Playlist (2007)	Love, Marriage & Divorce (2014)	Return of the Tender Lover (2015)

Singles from Love, Marriage & Divorce
- 1. "Hurt You" Released: August 17, 2013; 2. "Where Did We Go Wrong" Released: December 17, 2013; 3. "Roller Coaster" Released: May 24, 2014

Love, Marriage & Divorce is a collaborative studio album by American singers Toni Braxton and Babyface, released on February 4, 2014, by Motown Records. The album debuted at number four on the Billboard 200 and as of July 2, 2014 the album had sold 211,000 copies in the U.S. The album won Best R&B Album at the 57th Annual Grammy Awards. The album also poses as the eighth studio album by both artists, following Braxton's seventh studio album, Pulse (2010), and Babyface's seventh studio album, Playlist (2007).

== Background ==
"I think because Babyface and I have both gone through divorces, we can relate and we can collaborate together on this topic and make it so others who have gone through this situation can relate."

— Braxton describing her collaboration with Babyface.

Love, Marriage & Divorce includes eleven tracks including their Adult R&B Songs number-one single, "Hurt You", as well as the second single, "Where Did We Go Wrong". The album was originally due for release on November 25, 2013, but its release was delayed until the week before Valentine's Day. The album is Babyface's first new studio album in nearly seven years and Toni's first new album since 2010's Pulse. Shortly before the release of Love, Marriage & Divorce, Braxton announced that it would be her final studio album, as she wanted to retire and focus on a film career. Since its release, she has reversed her decision and announced a sequel to the recording due to the album's success.

== Singles ==
"Hurt You" released as the lead single on August 17, 2013. The audio video was released to Braxton's Vevo account on August 19, 2013. On September 7, 2013, the song debuted at number 17 on the Billboard Adult R&B Songs chart, The music video was released on Braxton and Babyface's joint Vevo account October 11, 2013. On December 14, 2013 "Hurt You" rose to the number 1 spot on the Adult R&B Songs chart for four weeks.

The song spent 41 weeks on the Adult R&B Songs chart before exiting the top 20. This marked Braxton's seventh No. 1 hit on the Adult R&B Songs chart and first since her 2000 release "Just Be a Man About It". The song also hit number 16 on Billboard's Hot R&B/Hip Hop Airplay chart.

"Where Did We Go Wrong?" was released as the second single on December 17, 2013. The song was instantly given to fans once they had pre-ordered the album. The audio video was released to Vevo on December 19, 2013.

== Critical reception ==
Professional ratings
Review scores
Source	Rating
ABC News	4/5 stars
AllMusic	3/5 stars
Cuepoint (Expert Witness)	A−
The New York Times	(mixed)
Rolling Stone	3.5/5 stars
The Times of India	3/5 stars

Love, Marriage & Divorce was met with positive reviews from critics. In his review for Cuepoint, Robert Christgau gave the album an A− rating, writing "weathered now, their mellow voices retain some lustre, and there’s narrative arc and emotional texture to the well-doctored material—hurting the one you don’t want to hurt, worrying about how she’s doing, makeup sex, post-split attraction. Yet amid these consistent songs, the single sole-composer credit stands out." Andy Kellman from AllMusic called the album a "solid addition to both artists' discographies," stating "on Love, Marriage & Divorce, Braxton and Babyface, creative partners going back to the early '90s, rekindle their musical relationship. Both endured broken marriages, and presumably it's those experiences that inform the material here – a succinct collection of 11 songs, eight of which are duets."

Allan Raible from ABC News felt that "this record seems gloriously stuck in a time warp. Honestly, Babyface and Braxton give us a glimpsing reminder of what high-quality R&B radio used to offer its listeners. Even when the two are hitting the "divorce" part of the record, it never sounds like a downer. It's two pros rekindling the pop magic. Considering this is Babyface's first album in 7 years and Braxton's first album in 4 years, this album delivers a much needed shot in the arm. This record was an extremely smart move." Bangkok Post's Chanun Poomsawai felt that Love, Marriage & Divorce "may not necessarily reinvent the wheel, but it’s a proof that both R&B veterans are still on top of their game even after two decades in the business. The chemistry here is more than tangible [..] What’s more, there’s enough groove and sass to counterbalance the sentimental and nostalgic, and for a concept album that focuses heavily on the dissolution of a relationship, this is a clever and well thought-out move."

Reagan Gavin Rasquinha from The Times of India found that "if there ever was a modern-day concept album dedicated to the idea of love, marriage and (hopefully not) divorce, it is this. With lyrics taking the centrestage rather than musical gymnastics, here, one of the oldest institutions in the world gets an analysis from an R&B standpoint." Similarly, Rolling Stone's Tannenbaum wrote that "with its marital arguments, dramatic plot reversals and luxurious exteriors, this collaboration between two accomplished R&B sensualists is like a musical adaptation of Real Housewives of Atlanta [...] Few records have described marriage with so much honesty and complexity." Ben Ratliff, writing for The New York Times, found that "the album is, in fact, mostly business. They alternate verses over gauzy medium-tempo, light-funk tracks, Babyface in his light tenor, Ms. Braxton in her emotive, petulant voice. They both own up to mistakes and confessing fantasies; [...] they depict anguish in a supremely organized, deeply clichéd way. There are very few details of a real person’s daily life. They are singing from a great height."

=== Accolades ===
The album was also nominated for World's Best Album at the 2014 World Music Awards. At the 57th Annual Grammy Awards, Love, Marriage & Divorce was awarded the Grammy Award for Best R&B Album.

== Commercial performance ==
Love, Marriage & Divorce debuted at number 4 on the US Billboard 200 chart with first-week sales of 67,000 copies, making it Braxton's sixth US top-ten album as well as Babyface’s highest-charting album in the US yet. It also entered at number one on Billboard's R&B/Hip-Hop Albums chart, becoming Babyface's first chart topper since Tender Lover (1989) and Braxton's fifth album to top the chart. By June 2014, Love, Marriage & Divorce had sold 211,000 copies in the US. Billboard ranked it 90th on its Billboard 200 year-end listing as well as 20th on the R&B/Hip-Hop Albums equivalent.

In the United Kingdom, the album debuted at number 75 on the UK Albums Chart and at number 7 on the UK R&B Chart. It became Babyface's first chart entry on both charts since his fourth studio album The Day (1996). Elsewhere, Love, Marriage & Divorce peaked at number three on the Korean Albums Chart and entered the charts in Belgium, Japan, and the Netherlands. In South Africa, it topped the South African Albums Chart, and was awarded double platinum award by Universal Music South Africa for sales in excess of 80,000 units.

== Track listing ==
Credits adapted from the album's liner notes and AllMusic. All lead vocals by Toni Braxton and Babyface, except where noted.

Standard edition
No.	Title	Writer(s)	Producer(s)	Length
1.	"Roller Coaster"	Kenneth Edmonds; Daryl Simmons; Antonio Dixon	Edmonds	4:23
2.	"Sweat"	Edmonds; Simmons; Dixon	Edmonds	4:27
3.	"Hurt You"	Braxton; Edmonds; Simmons; Dixon	Edmonds	4:10
4.	"Where Did We Go Wrong"	Edmonds; Braxton	Edmonds	3:37
5.	"I Hope That You're Okay" (lead vocals: Babyface)	Edmonds; Simmons	Edmonds	3:54
6.	"I Wish" (lead vocals: Braxton)	Braxton	Edmonds	3:03
7.	"Take It Back"	Braxton; Edmonds; Simmons; Dixon	Edmonds	4:05
8.	"Reunited"	Braxton; Edmonds; Simmons; Dixon	Edmonds	3:18
9.	"I'd Rather Be Broke" (lead vocals: Braxton)	Braxton; Leon Thomas III; Dixon; Edmonds; Khristopher Riddick-Tynes; Kameron Glasper	Edmunds; Dixon; The Rascals	3:38
10.	"Heart Attack"	Braxton; Edmonds; Simmons	Edmonds	3:52
11.	"The D Word"	Braxton; Edmonds	Edmonds	5:12
Total length:				43:39

Target deluxe edition bonus tracks
No.	Title	Writer(s)	Producer(s)	Length
12.	"Let's Do It"	Edmonds; Braxton	Edmonds	3:45
13.	"One"	Edmonds; Simmons	Edmonds; Simmons	2:22
Total length:				49:46

== Personnel ==
Credits adapted from liner notes and Allmusic.

- Babyface – keyboards, drum programming, guitar, bass, lead and background vocals
- Toni Braxton – lead and background vocals
- Daryl Simmons – additional vocal production, percussion
- Antonio Dixon – percussion, keyboards, additional drum programming
- The Rascals – keyboards, drum programming
- Demonte Posey – keyboards, drum programming, additional string arrangement
- Davy Nathan – additional piano
- Paul Boutin – recording engineer, mixing
- Rex Rideout – A&R
- Leesa D. Brunson – A&R Coordination
- Keith Tucker – A&R Administration
- Herb Powers, Jr. – mastering
- Marc Baptiste – photography
- Steve DeFino – art direction, design
- Kristen Yiengst – art direction

== Charts ==
=== Weekly charts ===
Chart (2014)	Peak position
Belgian Albums (Ultratop Flanders)	128
Belgian Albums (Ultratop Wallonia)	143
Dutch Albums (Album Top 100)	45
Japanese Albums (Oricon)	73
South African Albums (RISA)	1
South Korean Albums (Gaon)	76
UK Albums (Official Charts)	75
UK R&B Albums (Official Charts)	7
US Billboard 200	4
US Top R&B/Hip-Hop Albums (Billboard)	1

=== Year-end charts ===
Chart (2014)	Position
US Billboard 200	90
US Top R&B/Hip-Hop Albums (Billboard)	20

== Sales ==
Region	Certification	Certified units/sales
United States	—	211,000
