= Pulse (Toni Braxton album) =

Studio album by Toni Braxton
- Released: May 4, 2010
- Recorded: September 2008 – March 2010
- Studios: Side 3 Studios (Denver, CO); Paramount Studios (Los Angeles, CA); Mason Sound Studios (North Hollywood, CA); Record Plant (Los Angeles, CA); Mux Music Studios (London, UK); Rokstone Studios (London, UK); Fool on the Hill Studios (Nashville, TN); Legacy Recording Studios (New York, NY)
- Genres: R&B; dance-pop; pop
- Length: 42:18
- Label: Atlantic
- Producers: Busbee; D'Mile; DJ Frank E; David Foster; Simon Franglen; Chuck Harmony; Steve Mac; MaddScientist; Harvey Mason, Jr.; Warren "Oak" Felder; Lucas Secon; Stargate

Toni Braxton chronology
Playlist: The Very Best of Toni Braxton (2008)	Pulse (2010)	Love, Marriage & Divorce (2014)

Singles from Pulse
- 1. "Yesterday" Released: September 29, 2009; 2. "Hands Tied" Released: February 23, 2010; 3. "Make My Heart" Released: February 23, 2010

Pulse is the seventh studio album by American singer Toni Braxton. It was released on May 4, 2010, by Atlantic Records. Her first album in five years and served as Braxton's debut for the Atlantic label, after signing a new record deal. Production for the album took place during September 2008 to March 2010 and was handled by several record producers, including David Foster, Harvey Mason, Jr., Frank E, Oak Felder, Lucas Secon, Simon Franglen and Stargate. Pulse features up-tempo songs and R&B ballads with production varying from smooth to dance-based styles.

Upon its release, Pulse was released to positive reception from music critics, who complimented its execution, calling a return to form. Criticism mainly targeted the album's trend-chasing nature. Commercially, Pulse debuted and peaked at number 9 on the US Billboard 200, selling 54,000 copies in its first week. It also entered the top 10 in Switzerland as well as the top 20 in Germany and Greece. By February 2014, Pulse had sold 156,000 copies in the United States. Its three singles, "Yesterday", "Hands Tied" and "Make My Heart," achieved moderate chart success.

== Background ==
In October 2009, Atlantic Records chairman Craig Kallman revealed that the label had signed Braxton. Production for the album took place during September 2008 to March 2010 and was handled by several record producers, including David Foster, Harvey Mason, Jr., DJ Frank E, Oak, Lucas Secon, Simon Franglen and Dapo Torimiro. The entertainment outlet Rap-Up revealed, that Braxton also collaborated with Robin Thicke, Trey Songz, Usher, while other reported collaborations included Claude Kelly, and Steve Mac. R&B songwriter and singer Ne-Yo also worked on songs for the album.

Speaking of the thinking behind titling the album Pulse, Braxton explained to UK R&B writer Pete Lewis, Deputy Editor of Blues & Soul, in May 2010: "It comes from when I got ill. I went into cardiac rehab, and there was this older lady there. She was like 'What are you doing here so young? It must have been your heart. You know what? This is my fourth heart-attack and you're so young, you can't be AFRAID! You can't stop LIVING!'... Then she told me how she'd just got back from holiday with her 40-year-old boyfriend! And because I'd lost hope – the doctors had told me I'd never be able to record again – her conversation was like that heartbeat, that pulse that gave me back the love of life."

== Music ==
In an interview with Digital Spy, Braxton explained that she had recorded around 30 songs and would like to collaborate with artists, such as Alicia Keys. Braxton also explained the delay of the album: "The album was supposed to come out in February, but we held it back because seven of the ten songs we picked were leaked. We decided to go back to the studio, record four or five more songs and then pick. Now we send everything via Federal Express – nothing's going through the internet – and that's why none of the new songs have leaked so far." The song "Woman" is a cover version of the original song by Delta Goodrem from her 2007 album Delta.

For the collaborations which none of them made the final album pressings. However, the deluxe edition of the album on the iTunes Store contains several of them as bonus tracks including the remix of "Yesterday" featuring Trey Songz, "The Wave" written by Jesse McCartney and Makeba Riddick, "Stay", "Rewind" and "Yesterday (Cutmore Radio Remix)". It also features the high publicised "Caught (Don't Take Your Hat Off)" featuring Academy Award winning actress Mo'Nique, who appears in the middle of the song with a dramatic monologue.

The collaboration with R&B singer Robin Thicke called "Don't Leave" would have featured on Braxton's vocals with Thicke providing production. Whilst the high-profile collaboration with fellow R&B singer Usher also failed to materialize. Amongst reports that Braxton was working with Rodney "Darkchild" Jerkins, a song tipped to be produced by Darkchild called "Get Loose" was also omitted from the album. Additionally reggae singer Sean Paul recorded some vocals for a remix of "Lookin' At Me" but it is currently unknown what will become of the remix since it is not featured on the album.

== Release and promotion ==
The album were scheduled to be released in 2009, but it was then being pushed back to February 2, 2010, before ultimately being released May 4, 2010, by Atlantic Records. Braxton told Rap-Up, that the album had been pushed back, because all 7 of those album's ten songs were leaked and so she has decided to go back into the studio to begin recording some new songs. The official cover art of the album was released on March 9, 2010. Amazon.com streamed a different song from Pulse each week up until the album's release day. Braxton performed "Make My Heart" on The Ellen DeGeneres Show on April 27, 2010, The Wendy Williams Show and gave an interview on Good Day L.A.. On May 3, 2010, she performed "Hands Tied" and "Breathe Again" on The Mo'Nique Show. "Hands Tied" was also performed on May 4, 2010 on The Today Show along with her most successful single "Un-Break My Heart".

=== Singles ===
The album's first single, "Yesterday" was released digitally on November 20, 2009. This version, which features guest vocals from a fellow singer Trey Songz, was also released with the latter serving as the US single, whilst the former was serviced internationally. The song peaked at number 12 on the US Hot R&B/Hip-Hop Songs chart.

The music videos for the next two singles; "Hands Tied" and "Make My Heart" with director Bille Woodruff, who worked with Braxton previously, including on the videos for "Un-Break My Heart" and "He Wasn't Man Enough". The video for "Make My Heart" premiered on April 13 whilst the video for "Hands Tied" was released on April 14, 2010. "Hands Tied" peaked at number 29 on the Hot R&B/Hip-Hop Songs.

=== Other songs ===
The music video for the song "Woman" premiered June 28, 2010, on Yahoo! Music. The video shows a live performance of the song.

"Stay", previously only available on the deluxe edition of the album, was made available for streaming on August 23, 2019 by X5 Music Group.

== Critical reception ==
Professional ratings
Aggregate scores
Source	Rating
Metacritic	(71/100)
Review scores
Source	Rating
411Mania	(6.5/10)
About.com	3/5 stars
Allmusic	4/5 stars
Billboard	(favorable)
BBC Music	(mixed)
The Boston Globe	(favorable)
Robert Christgau	(dud)
Los Angeles Times	2/4 stars
USA Today	3/4 stars
The Washington Post	(favorable)

Upon its release, the album received positive reviews from most music critics, based on an aggregate score of 71/100 from Metacritic. Allmusic writer Andy Kellman gave it 4 out of 5 stars and commended its material's themes, noting "a high level of conviction that does not waver, and it's particularly impressive given that the album covers so many stages of a romantic relationship". USA Today's Steve Jones gave the album 3 out of 4 stars and viewed it as "a return to form" for Braxton. Ken Capobianco of The Boston Globe gave Pulse a positive review and wrote favorably of its execution, stating "Braxton and her star producers and songwriters mix old-school R&B balladry and modern dance pop while always keeping that luxurious voice as the focus".

In contrast, Los Angeles Times writer Mikael Wood gave it 2 out of 4 stars and expressed a mixed response to "her attempt to keep up with" contemporary R&B artists, writing that "the flimsy material can't quite conceal her hit-hungry desperation". BBC Music's Natalie Shaw shared a similar sentiment, writing that the album "misfires when its slower numbers are interspersed with uptempo tracks ready-made for the younger market". Mark Edward Nero of About.com gave the album 3 out of 5 stars and wrote that "no new ground is broken, no significant risks are taken and the album as a whole doesn't really have any must-hear tracks", but recommended it to listeners of Braxton's previous work and noted that she "can still sing strongly and passionately". The Washington Post's Sarah Godfrey commended the album's "club tracks" and wrote favorably of Braxton's "trusty album architecture of scorching dance songs, soft-focused up-tempo ballads and "Un-Break My Heart"-style tear-jerkers without going too over-the-top".

== Commercial performance ==
The album debuted at number 9 on the US Billboard 200, with first-week sales of 54,000 copies, making it Braxton's fifth US top-ten album. It also entered at number one on Billboard's R&B/Hip-Hop Albums chart. In its second week, Pulse dropped to number 22 and has sold 16,588 in the United States. On the third week, the album dropped to number 41. In Canada, Pulse debuted at number 72 on the Top 100 Albums chart, and in the United Kingdom, it debuted at number 28 on the Top 40 Albums and at number 7 on the R&B Albums chart.

== Track listing ==
No.	Title	Writer(s)	Producer(s)	Length
1.	"Yesterday"	Justin Franks; Jerome Armstrong; Michael White; Terrance Battle; Toni Braxton	DJ Frank E; Harvey Mason, Jr.^{[a]}	3:48
2.	"Make My Heart"	Lucas Secon; Makeba Riddick; Joseph Freeman; Aubreya Gravatt; Theodore Life, Jr.	Secon	3:27
3.	"Hands Tied"	Mason, Jr.; Warren Felder; Heather Bright	Oak; Mason, Jr.	3:53
4.	"Woman"	Steve Mac; Wayne Hector	Mac; David Foster; Mason, Jr.^{[a]}	3:51
5.	"If I Have to Wait"	Michael Busbee; Jud Friedman; Allan Rich; Braxton	Busbee; Mason, Jr.^{[a]}	3:56
6.	"Lookin' at Me"	Secon; Riddick	Secon	3:20
7.	"Wardrobe"	Dernst Emile; Taurian Shropshire	D'Mile; Mason, Jr.^{[a]}	3:31
8.	"Hero"	Mason, Jr.; Kara DioGuardi; Kasia Livingston; James Fauntleroy II; Steve Russell	Mason, Jr.	4:32
9.	"No Way"	Michael Warren	Warren; Mason, Jr.^{[a]}	3:31
10.	"Pulse"	Charles Harmon; Christopher Jackson	Chuck Harmony; Simon Franglen; Mason, Jr.^{[a]}	3:47
11.	"Why Won't You Love Me"	Mason, Jr.; Braxton	Mason, Jr.; Braxton	4:42
Total length:				42:18

Pulse – US Target edition (bonus tracks)
No.	Title	Writer(s)	Producer(s)	Length
12.	"The Wave"	Jesse McCartney; Riddick; Theron Thomas	MaddScientist; Mason, Jr.^{[a]}	3:41
13.	"Yesterday" (Cutmore Remix Radio Edit)	Franks; Armstrong; White; Battle; Braxton	DJ Frank E; Mason, Jr.^{[a]}; Cutemore^{[b]}	3:16

Pulse – Japanese edition (bonus tracks)
No.	Title	Writer(s)	Producer(s)	Length
12.	"Yesterday" (featuring Trey Songz)	Franks; Armstrong; White; Battle; Braxton; Tremaine Neverson	DJ Frank E; Mason, Jr.^{[a]}	3:46
13.	"Rewind"	Mason, Jr.; Daniels; Brown; Schuck; Braxton; Braxton	Mason, Jr.; Brown	3:32

Pulse – Digital deluxe edition (bonus tracks)
No.	Title	Writer(s)	Producer(s)	Length
12.	"Yesterday" (featuring Trey Songz)	Franks; Armstrong; White; Battle; Braxton; Neverson	DJ Frank E; Mason, Jr.^{[a]}	3:46
13.	"Stay"	Mason, Jr.; Russell; Anna Wright; JayShawn Champion	Mason, Jr.	3:31
14.	"Rewind"	Mason, Jr.; LaShawn Daniels; Brody Brown; Aaron Bay-Schuck; Tamar Braxton; Braxton	Mason, Jr.; Brody Brown	3:32
15.	"Caught (Don't Take Your Hat Off)" (featuring Mo'Nique)	Andre Harris; Vidal Davis; Bryan Sledge; Harold Lilly	Dre & Vidal	3:29

Pulse – iTunes Store and international digital store deluxe edition (bonus tracks)
No.	Title	Writer(s)	Producer(s)	Length
15.	"The Wave"	McCartney; Riddick; Thomas	MaddScientist; Mason, Jr.^{[a]}	3:41
16.	"Caught (Don't Take Your Hat Off)" (featuring Mo'Nique)	Harris; Davis; Sledge; Lilly	Dre & Vidal	3:29
17.	"Yesterday" (Cutmore Remix Radio Edit)	Franks; Armstrong; White; Battle; Braxton	DJ Frank E; Mason, Jr.^{[a]}; Cutmore^{[b]}	3:16
18.	"Yesterday" (music video)
19.	"Make My Heart" (music video)
20.	"Hands Tied" (music video)
21.	"30-Minute Interview"

Notes

- ^{^[a]} signifies vocal producer
- ^{^[b]} signifies additional producer

Sample credits

- "Make My Heart" contains elements of "We're Going to a Party" (1977), performed by Evelyn "Champagne" King.

== Personnel and credits ==
Musicians

- Paul Bailey – instruments
- Steve Brewster – instruments
- Tamar Braxton – background vocals
- Toni Braxton – instruments, vocals
- Heather Bright – background vocals
- Jimmy Carter – instruments
- City of Prague Philhomic Orchestra – instruments
- Don E – instruments
- James Fauntleroy – background vocals
- Oak Felder – instruments
- Paul Franklin – steel guitar
- Frank E – instruments
- Andrew Hey – instruments
- John Hobbs – instruments
- Jeff King – instruments
- Josh Lopez – instruments
- Jacob Luttrell – instruments
- Harvey Mason, Jr. – instruments
- John Parricelli – instruments
- Makeba Riddick – background vocals
- Lucas Secon – instruments, background vocals
- Troy Taylor – instruments
- Bobby Terry – instruments
- Dapo Torimiro – instruments
- Michael Warren – instruments
- Brandon White – instruments

Production

- Busbee – producer
- Toni Braxton – producer
- Oak Felder – producer
- David Foster – producer
- Simon Franglen – producer
- Justin "DJ Frank E" Franks – producer
- Chuck Harmony – producer
- Steve Mac – producer
- Harvey Mason, Jr. – producer
- D'Mile – producer
- Madd Scientist – producer
- Lucas Secon – producer
- Troy Taylor – producer
- Michael Warren – producer

== Charts ==
=== Weekly charts ===
Chart (2010)	Peak position
Australian Urban Albums (ARIA)	22
Austrian Albums (Ö3 Austria)	32
Canadian Albums (Billboard)	72
Dutch Albums (Album Top 100)	83
German Albums (Offizielle Top 100)	18
Greek Albums (IFPI)	14
Japanese Albums (Oricon)	115
Scottish Albums (Official Charts)	51
Swiss Albums (Schweizer Hitparade)	9
UK Albums (Official Charts)	28
UK Album Downloads (Official Charts)	23
UK R&B Albums (Official Charts)	7
US Billboard 200	9
US Top R&B/Hip-Hop Albums (Billboard)	1

=== Year-end charts ===
Chart (2010)	Position
US Top R&B/Hip-Hop Albums (Billboard)	53

== Release history ==
Region	Date	Label	Catalog
United States	May 4, 2010	Atlantic Records	075678959301
Canada	May 4, 2010	Atlantic Records	
Germany	May 7, 2010	Warner Music	
Poland	May 7, 2010	Warner Music	7567893027
Australia	May 8, 2010	Warner Music	
The Netherlands	May 8, 2010	Warner Music	
United Kingdom	May 10, 2010	Atlantic Records (UK)	756789302
Worldwide	May 10, 2010	Warner Music	
South Korea	May 10, 2010	Warner Music	WKPD-0155
Mexico	May 18, 2010	Warner Music	75678930270
Japan	May 26, 2010	Warner Music	WPCR-13837
Brazil	May 27, 2010	Warner Music	75678930270
South Africa	May 28, 2010	Warner Music	
