= Where Did We Go Wrong (Toni Braxton and Babyface song) =

Single by Toni Braxton and Babyface

from the album Love, Marriage & Divorce
- Released: December 17, 2013
- Studio: Brandon's Way Recording Studios (Los Angeles County, CA)
- Length: 3:37
- Label: Motown
- Songwriter(s): Kenneth Edmonds; Toni Braxton
- Producer(s): Edmonds

Toni Braxton singles chronology
"Hurt You" (2013)	"Where Did We Go Wrong" (2013)	"Roller Coaster" (2014)

Babyface singles chronology
"Hurt You" (2013)	"Where Did We Go Wrong" (2013)	"Roller Coaster" (2014)

"Where Did We Go Wrong" is a song by American recording artists Toni Braxton and Babyface. It was written by Braxton and Babyface for their collaborative studio album Love, Marriage & Divorce (2014), while production was helmed by latter. The song was released on December 17, 2013 as the second single from the album. "Where Did We Go Wrong" peaked at number 11 on the US Adult R&B Songs and was ranked 38th on the chart's year-end listing.

== Commercial performance ==
"Where Did We Go Wrong" peaked at number 11 on the US Adult R&B Songs on May 3, 2014, and entered the top 40 of the R&B/Hip-Hop Airplay chart. Billboard ranked the song 38th on the 2014 Adult R&B Songs year-end chart.

== Promotion ==
Braxton and Babyface performed "Where Did We Go Wrong" on American morning television show Good Morning America on July 2, 2014.

== Credits and personnel ==
Credits adapted from the liner notes of Love, Marriage & Divorce.

- Paul Boutin – mixing, recording
- Toni Braxton – vocals, writer
- Antonio Dixon – percussion
- Kenneth "Babyface" Edmonds – bass, guitar, producer, vocals, writer

== Charts ==
=== Weekly charts ===
Chart (2013–14)	Peak position
South Korea International (Circle)	55
US Adult R&B Songs (Billboard)	11
US R&B/Hip-Hop Airplay (Billboard)	39

=== Year-end charts ===
Chart (2014)	Position
US Adult R&B Songs (Billboard)	38
