= Reaction (album) =

Studio album by Rebbie Jackson
- Released: October 7, 1986
- Recorded: 1985–1986
- Genre: R&B; synth-pop; new jack swing
- Length: 42:01
- Label: Columbia; CBS
- Producer: David "Pic" Conley; Reggie Lucas

Rebbie Jackson chronology
Centipede (1984)	Reaction (1986)	R U Tuff Enuff (1988)

Singles from Reaction
- 1. "Reaction" Released: February 14, 1986; 2. "You Send the Rain Away" Released: May 23, 1986

Professional ratings
Review scores
Source	Rating
AllMusic	3/5 stars

Reaction is the second studio album by American R&B singer Rebbie Jackson. The album was released on October 7, 1986 and spawned two mildly successful singles, "Reaction" and "You Send the Rain Away", a duet with Robin Zander. "Ticket To Love" was going to be released as the second single and received a very limited promo release before being cancelled in favour of "You Send the Rain Away". The album-only track "Tonight I'm Yours", a duet with Isaac Hayes, received substantial airplay but was not commercially released as a single.

== Release ==
The song "Reaction" was released as the first single from the eponymous album. The single peaked at number fifteen on the Billboard dance chart and number sixteen on the Billboard R&B chart. The single was released on a 12" format, including an extended dance mix, radio edit, and dub. The single was also released in a 7" format, including a radio edit and instrumental version.

Reaction received a limited CD reissue in Japan in the early 1990s. It was reissued on CD with Jackson's previous album Centipede on May 18, 2010. The album was reissued by Funky Town Grooves on CD in October 2012 and included 7 bonus tracks.

== Track listing ==
1. "Reaction" (David Conley, David Townsend, Bernard Jackson) – 5:39
2. "Ain't No Way to Love" (Robert Brookins, Tony Haynes, Philip Bailey) – 4:15
3. "Ticket to Love" (Erik Nuri) – 4:48
4. "You Don't Know What You're Missing" (Howie Rice, Allan D. Rich, Barry Fasman) – 3:51
5. "You Send the Rain Away" (with Robin Zander) (Preston Glass, Gloria Sklerov, Lenny Macaluso) – 4:59
6. "If You Don't Call (You Don't Care)" (Erik Nuri, Patrick Henderson) – 5:11
7. "Always Wanting Something" (Tito Jackson, Vassal Benford) – 4:27
8. "Tonight I'm Yours" (with Isaac Hayes) (Vassal Benford, Rebbie Jackson, Lanar Brantley) – 4:16
9. "Lessons (In the Fine Art of Love)" (Reggie Lucas, Leslie Lynne Smith) – 4:37

=== 2012 Expanded edition ===
Bonus tracks
No.	Title	Length
10.	"You Send the Rain Away" (Single Version)
11.	"Reaction" (Single Version)
12.	"Reaction" (Reaction (Extended Dance Mix))
13.	"Reaction" (Dub)
14.	"Reaction" (Instrumental)
15.	"Ticket to Love" (7 Inch Mix)
16.	"Ticket to Love" (12 Inch Mix)

== Charts ==
Chart (1986)	Peak position
US Top R&B/Hip-Hop Albums (Billboard)	54

=== Singles ===
"Reaction"
Chart (1986)	Peak position
US Dance Club Songs (Billboard)	15
US Hot R&B/Hip-Hop Songs (Billboard)	16
