= Where Did We Go Wrong (Dondria song) =

Single by Dondria

from the album Dondria vs. Phatfffat
- Released: June 29, 2010
- Recorded: 2009
- Genre: R&B, soul
- Length: 4:02
- Label: So So Def/Def Jam
- Songwriter(s): Bryan-Michael Cox, Jermaine Dupri, Dondria
- Producer(s): Jermaine Dupri, Bryan-Michael Cox

Dondria singles chronology
"Shawty Wus Up" (2010)	"Where Did We Go Wrong" (2010)

"Where Did We Go Wrong" is a song by American singer Dondria. It is the third single from her debut album Dondria vs. Phatfffat. The song peaked at number 72 on the Billboard Hot R&B/Hip-Hop Songs chart.

== Charts ==
Chart (2010)	Peak position
U.S. Billboard Hot R&B/Hip-Hop Songs	72
