= Hurt You (Toni Braxton and Babyface song) =

Single by Toni Braxton and Babyface

from the album Love, Marriage & Divorce
- Released: August 17, 2013
- Studio: Brandon's Way Recording Studios (Los Angeles County, CA)
- Length: 4:10
- Label: Motown
- Songwriters: Kenneth "Babyface" Edmonds; Daryl Simmons; Toni Braxton; Antonio Dixon
- Producer: Kenneth "Babyface" Edmonds

Toni Braxton singles chronology
"I Heart You" (2012)	"Hurt You" (2013)	"Where Did We Go Wrong" (2013)

Babyface singles chronology
"I Need a Love Song" (2008)	"Hurt You" (2013)	"Where Did We Go Wrong" (2013)

"Hurt You" is a song by American singers Toni Braxton and Babyface. It was written by Braxton and Babyface along with Daryl Simmons and Antonio Dixon for their collaborative studio album Love, Marriage & Divorce (2014), while Babyface helmed production. The song was released on August 17, 2013, as the lead single from the album. It topped the US Adult R&B Songs and was ranked fifth on the chart's year-end listing.

== Background ==
In early February 2013, Braxton appeared on Good Morning America and The Wendy Williams Show to promote her new movie role in the Lifetime Movie Twist of Faith, also confirming the rumors of her retirement, revealing that she was retiring from music and stating that she would like to focus on acting: "I have to do shows here and there, but I'm not gonna do any albums, I'm falling out of love with it, it's weird. I don't know what to say when I hear songs. They don't impact me. I've been trying to listen to songs, record companies have been calling me, so it's a good situation to be in, but I'm not really interested at all". Months later in June 2013, Braxton announced that she was returning to music with a Summer Tour and that she was in the studio working on her eighth studio album after a number of singers and friends including Anita Baker, Prince, and Missy Elliott had reached out to her not to retire the music business.

== Commercial performance ==
"Hurt You" debuted at number 17 on the US Billboard Adult R&B Songs chart on September 7, 2013, later rising to the number 1 spot on December 14, 2013, for four weeks. The song spent 41 weeks on the Adult R&B Songs chart before exiting the Top 20 Chart. This marked Braxton's seventh chart topper on the Adult R&B Songs chart and first since her 2000 release "Just Be a Man About It." The song also hit number 16 on Billboard Hot R&B/Hip Hop Airplay chart.

== Music video ==
The music video for "Hurt You" was directed by Norwegian director Ray Kay. It premiered on October 11, 2013, on Braxton and Babyface's joint Vevo account on YouTube. The video is a representation of the track that tells about the hardships of being in a relationship. The clip opens up with Braxton and Babyface in two different rooms, which are separated by a wall. They both manage to break through the wall to express their desire to start all over again.

== Promotion ==
Braxton and Babyface appeared on The Arsenio Hall Show on November 22, 2013, performing "Hurt You." They also appeared on The Steve Harvey Morning Show on February 3, 2014, and The Ellen Degeneres Show on May 9, 2014, also performing "Hurt You."

== Track listing ==
Digital single

- "Hurt You" – 4:11

== Credits and personnel ==
Credits adapted from the liner notes of Love, Marriage & Divorce.

- Paul Boutin – mixing, recording
- Toni Braxton – vocals, writer
- Antonio Dixon – writer
- Kenneth "Babyface" Edmonds – guitar, producer, vocals, writer
- Daryl Simmons – vocal producer, writer

== Charts ==
=== Weekly charts ===
Chart (2013)	Peak position
US Adult R&B Songs (Billboard)	1
US Bubbling Under Hot 100 (Billboard)	13
US R&B/Hip-Hop Airplay (Billboard)	16

=== Year-end charts ===
Chart (2014)	Position
US Adult R&B Songs (Billboard)	5
