= Centipede (Rebbie Jackson song) =

1984 song by Rebbie Jackson

Single by Rebbie Jackson

from the album Centipede
- Released: September 1984
- Recorded: 1984
- Studio: Yamaha International (Glendale, California); Widetrack (Los Angeles)
- Length: 4:25 (album version); 4:13 (single version)
- Label: Columbia
- Songwriter: Michael Jackson
- Producer: Michael Jackson

Rebbie Jackson singles chronology
"Centipede" (1984)	"A Fork in the Road" (1985)

Music video
- "Centipede" on YouTube

"Centipede" is a song by American singer Rebbie Jackson. Written and produced by her younger brother Michael, the track was the debut single from her debut album, Centipede. The song peaked at number 24 on the US Billboard Hot 100 and was a top-10 hit in New Zealand, where it reached number four.

== Background ==
The song was written and produced by Jackson's younger brother Michael Jackson. He and the Weather Girls also sang backing vocals on the song. The 12-inch single includes an extended mix and an instrumental version. On the back of the single, Michael Jackson dedicated the song "to my mannequin friends".

The song was later re-released on The Rebbie Jackson Collection (1996) and the original 12-inch version was included on her comeback album Yours Faithfully (1998).

== Release and reception ==
Released in 1984, "Centipede" peaked at number four on the US Billboard Hot Black Singles chart and at number 24 on the Billboard Hot 100. It was Jackson's highest-charting single and her only single to enter the Hot 100. "Centipede" was certified gold by the Recording Industry Association of America (RIAA), selling 500,000 copies in the US.

== Personnel ==
- Lead vocals: Rebbie Jackson
- Background vocals: Michael Jackson, the Weather Girls (Izora Rhodes, Martha Wash)
- Arranger: Michael Jackson
- John Barnes: synthesizers and drum programming
- David Williams: guitar
- Jerry Hey: flugelhorn

== Charts ==
=== Weekly charts ===
Chart (1984–1985)	Peak position
Australia (Kent Music Report)	97
New Zealand (Recorded Music NZ)	4
US Billboard Hot 100	24
US Hot Black Singles (Billboard)	4
US Hot Dance/Disco (Billboard)	29
US Cash Box Top 100	15

=== Year-end charts ===
Chart (1985)	Position
New Zealand (RIANZ)	49

== Certifications ==
Region	Certification	Certified units/sales
United States (RIAA)	Gold	500,000^{^}
^{^} Shipments figures based on certification alone.
