= Rebbie Jackson =

American singer (born 1950)

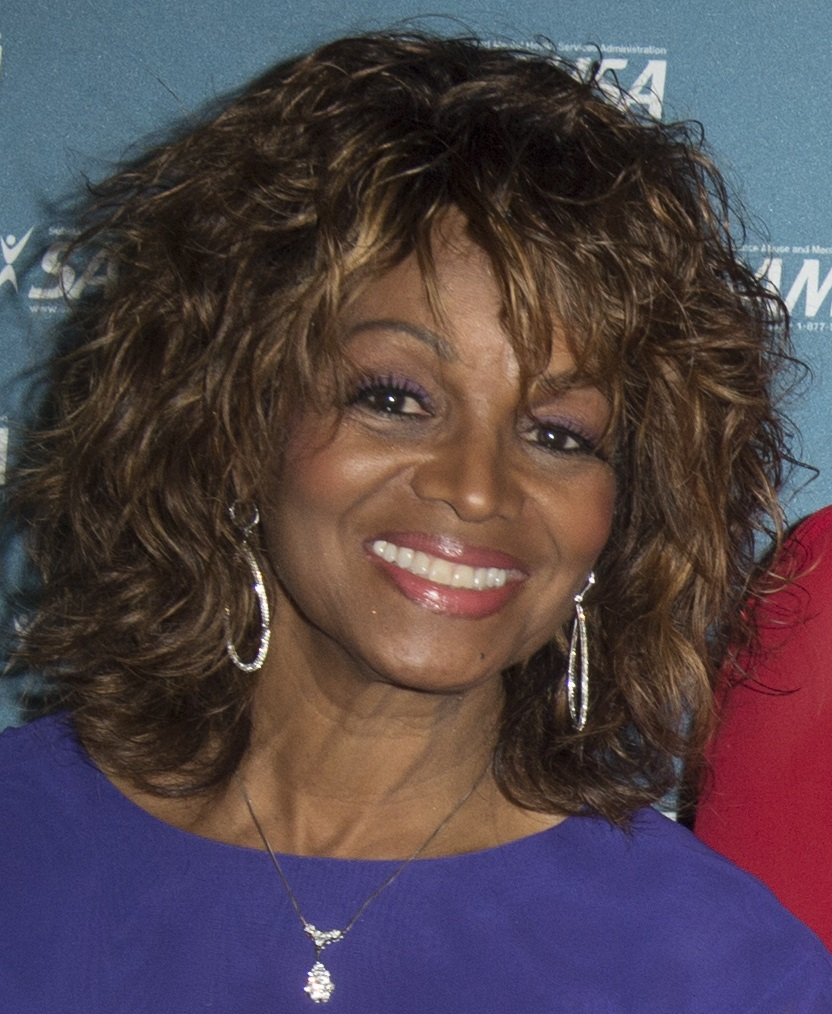
- Jackson accepting an award at the 2016 Voice Awards
- Born: Maureen Reillette Jackson; May 29, 1950 (age 76); Gary, Indiana, U.S.
- Other name: Rebbie
- Occupation: Singer
- Years active: 1974–present
- Spouse: Nathaniel Brown (m. 1968; died 2013)
- Children: 3, including Austin
- Parents: Joe Jackson; Katherine Jackson
- Family: Jackson
- Musical career
- Genres: Pop; R&B; soul; dance
- Instrument: Vocals
- Labels: Columbia; MJJ Music; SuperBird

Maureen Reillette "Rebbie" Jackson-Brown (/ˈriːbi/; born May 29, 1950) is an American singer and the eldest child of the Jackson family of musicians. She first performed on stage with her siblings during shows in Las Vegas at the MGM Grand Hotel and Casino in 1974, before appearing in the CBS television series The Jacksons. At age 34, Jackson released her debut studio album Centipede (1984). The album's title track was written by her younger brother Michael and has been her most successful single release. She released two more studio albums: Reaction (1986) and R U Tuff Enuff (1988).

After a seven-year hiatus, Jackson returned with a cover version of "Forever Young" for the Free Willy 2: The Adventure Home (1995) soundtrack before releasing Yours Faithfully (1998), three years later. It was her last album and a collaboration with artists and producers including Men of Vizion's Spanky Williams, Keith Thomas, and Eliot Kennedy. It featured contributions from her children. In 2011, Jackson embarked on the Pick Up the Phone Tour, which is dedicated to American teenagers who have died by suicide.

== Life and career ==
=== Childhood and youth ===
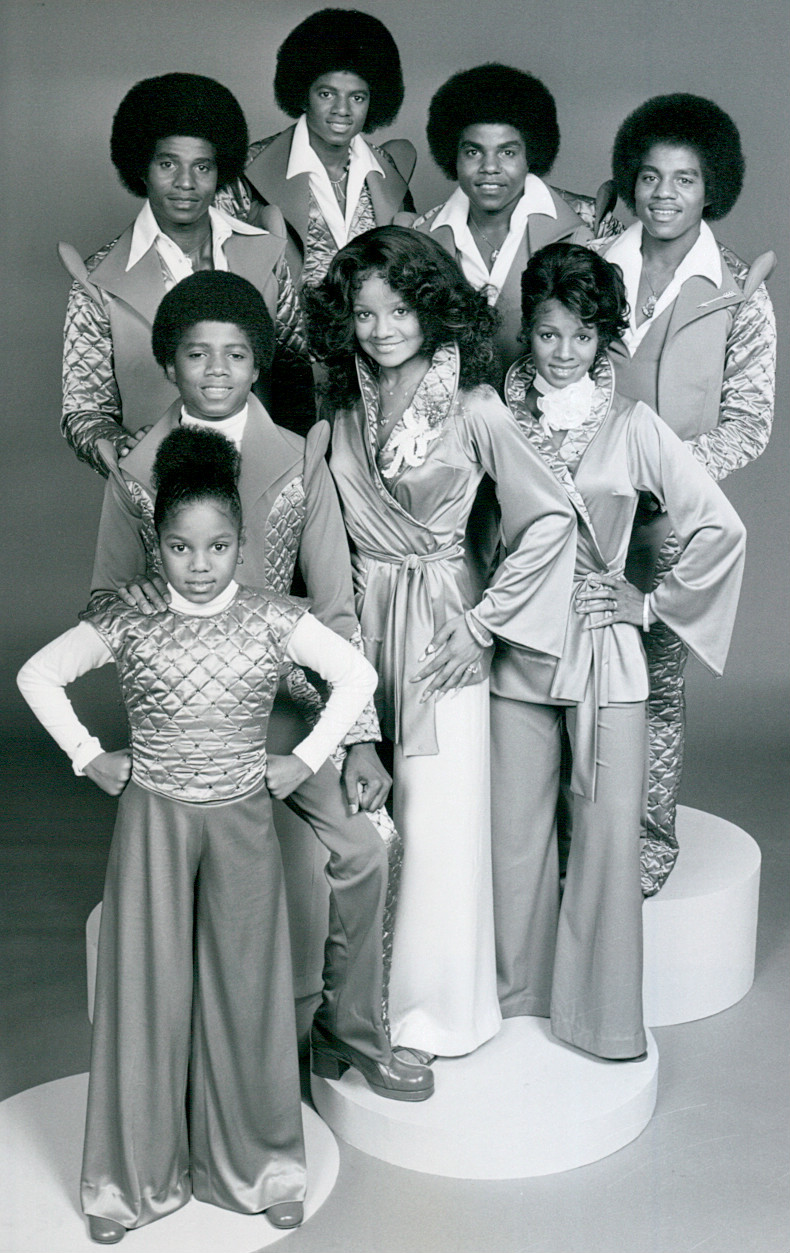
From left, back row: Jackie Jackson, Michael Jackson, Tito Jackson, Marlon Jackson, middle row: Randy Jackson, La Toya Jackson, Rebbie Jackson, front row: Janet Jackson (1977)

Maureen Reillette Jackson was born at 2300 Jackson Street in Gary, Indiana to a working-class family on May 29, 1950. She is the eldest child of Joseph Walter "Joe" Jackson (July 26, 1928 – June 27, 2018), and Katherine Esther Jackson (née Scruse, May 4, 1930) and is the eldest of their 10 children. Her 9 younger siblings are Jackie, Tito (d. September 15, 2024), Jermaine, La Toya (born on Rebbie's sixth birthday), Marlon, Brandon (d. March 12, 1957), Michael (d. June 25, 2009), Randy, and Janet.

Joseph Jackson was a steel mill employee who often performed in a rhythm and blues (R&B) band called the Falcons with his brother, Luther. Katherine is one of Jehovah's Witnesses; she instructed her children to follow the religion. Rebbie, La Toya, and Michael became the most devout of the children in the faith as time progressed. Reflecting on her early life, Jackson acknowledged in a 1980s magazine interview that her role within the family had been that of a "second mother" to her younger siblings, whom she would often babysit, along with her eldest brother Jackie. She graduated from Theodore Roosevelt High School in Gary in 1968.

=== Early career ===
Jackson began her singing career in 1974, performing with her siblings in Las Vegas. The Vegas shows had initially begun in April, without her. Due to a sprained ankle, Jackson's debut was postponed until June. Her five brothers were the main draw, while she, Randy, Janet, and La Toya served as filler performers for the events.

When the Jackson 5 parted with their record label Motown in 1976, they signed to Epic Records and rebranded themselves The Jacksons. Additionally, the brothers were signed to CBS to star with their family in a variety series called The Jacksons. The show premiered in June 1976 and featured all of the siblings excluding Jermaine, who had chosen to stay with Motown. The initial series run of the 30-minute programs was four weeks. Due to ratings success, more episodes were ordered in January 1977. The show marked the first time that an African-American family had ever starred in a television series. The run of programs concluded shortly afterwards.

Prior to the series, Jackson had thought of her singing as merely a private hobby. Her television experience, as well as an early love of musicals, motivated her to become a professional recording artist and the show's producer encouraged her to sing. Jackson served as a backing vocalist for several musicians around this time, as well as a cabaret singer. She contributed vocals to songs by artists including The Emotions, Sonny Bono, and Betty Wright before her second pregnancy stalled her musical career for a short time.

=== Centipede ===
After years of preparation, Jackson's debut album, Centipede, was released in October 1984 by Columbia Records, which had signed her as a solo artist in 1982. The album was only released once Jackson had ensured that family life was secure, and that she had spent time with her children during their younger years. Centipede reached No. 13 on Billboard's Top R&B/Hip-Hop Albums chart and No. 63 on its Top 200 chart. The recording of the album was a family affair. It involved several contributions from her relatives. Her husband Nathaniel Brown (1949–2013) co-wrote the song "Come Alive Saturday Night" with two of her brothers, Randy and Tito. Tito Jackson also penned "Hey Boy" with his wife Dee Dee. The most successful song from the album was the million-selling title track, "Centipede". Written, arranged, and produced by Michael Jackson, the song also featured Michael and The Weather Girls on backing vocals. It reached No. 4 on the Black Singles Chart and was subsequently certified gold by the Recording Industry Association of America. "Centipede" marked Michael's first work writing and producing since the release of his successful Thriller album (1982).

Other tracks from Jackson's album included cover versions of songs by Prince ("I Feel for You") and Smokey Robinson and the Miracles ("A Fork in the Road"). The album received mixed reviews from journalists and music critics. According to Jet magazine, Centipede marked Jackson's emergence as a "legitimate recording artist" and "cleared the major hurdle of demonstrating that she [was] talented and marketable." With the album, Jackson became the last of her siblings to embark on a recording career and the last in line to release hit material.

Jackson later revealed that several discussions occurred at the time of the release of Centipede over whether she should use the Jackson surname professionally or not. Jackson did not want to use her maiden surname, but later reasoned that it was silly to deny her heritage. She said that she compromised in using her family name on the Centipede album cover, "Rebbie is large and Jackson is small." She further said that the success of siblings Michael and Janet had not been a hindrance to her, but served as an enhancement to her career. Jackson added that she did not have to worry about "name recognition."

=== Reaction and R U Tuff Enuff ===
Reaction was the follow-up album to Centipede and was released in October 1986. It was recorded at Tito's Ponderosa Studios in Los Angeles. Tito produced Reaction along with David Conley and David Townsend of the R&B group Surface. Duets were featured on the album, including one with Cheap Trick lead singer Robin Zander and another with Isaac Hayes. The Zander-Jackson collaboration ("You Send the Rain Away") was released as a single and reached No. 50 on the R&B singles chart. Jackson's duet with Hayes, the ballad "Tonight I'm Yours," was not released as a single, although it received substantial airplay. Reaction's title track ("Reaction") was the most popular hit from the album, going to No. 16 on the R&B singles chart.

The album R U Tuff Enuff was released in July 1988, after Reaction. Jackson was more involved with the production of the album than she had been on her previous releases. She said at the time of R U Tuff Enuff's distribution that the sound on the album differed from anything she had done previously. Jackson commented that the album was "more versatile" and noted that it resembled other albums because it contained a lot of dance music. Two singles were released from the album and charted on the R&B singles chart: "Plaything," which made it into the top 10, and the title track "R U Tuff Enuff," which peaked at No. 78. By mid-June 1988, R U Tuff Enuff had reportedly sold 300,000 copies. MTV later concluded that the album "struggled". Jackson lent her vocals to "2300 Jackson Street" (the title track of her brothers' 2300 Jackson Street album), before going on a hiatus from releasing music. Jackson later stated that she performed around the world during the break.

=== Return to music and Yours Faithfully ===
When fans find out there's another Jackson coming out, they want to hear what the person is about. That can be a double-edged sword.

— Rebbie Jackson, 1998

After a seven-year break, Jackson returned with a cover of Bob Dylan's "Forever Young" for the 1995 film Free Willy 2: The Adventure Home. She was later signed to her brother Michael's record label MJJ Music and the first album in 10 years, Yours Faithfully, was released on March 31, 1998. It featured a remixed version of Jackson's successful "Centipede." Initially, Jackson had not wanted to feature the track, believing that it was part of the past. After thinking about it for a while, she felt that the inclusion of the remix—which features her son Austin rapping—would be a good way to return to the music scene. In addition, her two other children, Stacee and Yashi, contributed backing vocals for the album. Other tracks from the album included "Fly Away," which was written and produced by Michael, who also served as co-executive producer for Yours Faithfully. Fellow producers included Keith Thomas and Eliot Kennedy. The album featured a duet with Men of Vizion's Spanky Williams on the Spinners' "I Don't Want to Lose You," which Jet called a "sizzling" rendition. Yours Faithfully's title track was released as a single peaking at No. 78 on the R&B chart. Vibe magazine's Quohnos Mitchell expressed disappointment in the album, calling its content a "mix of dated R&B grooves dressed up with a few cleverly placed samples."

=== Death of Michael Jackson ===
Jackson's brother Michael died on June 25, 2009, after suffering a cardiac arrest caused by acute propofol intoxication. His memorial service was held 12 days later on July 7, and the finale featured group renditions of the Jackson anthems "We Are the World" and "Heal the World." Michael's siblings and his children sang at the memorial. After the service—which was held at Los Angeles' Staples Center—Rebbie and her sisters Janet and La Toya, addressed fans at the nearby L.A. Live entertainment complex, saying, "We are extremely grateful for all the support. We love you all." In the weeks after Michael's death, there was speculation in the media that Rebbie would be the primary caregiver for her late brother's children, Prince, Paris, and Blanket. Even if Michael and Rebbie's mother Katherine were granted custody of the children, it was assumed that Rebbie would care for the siblings on a day-to-day basis at the Jackson family's home in Encino, Los Angeles. Katherine was named the children's legal guardian in August 2009. In early 2011, Jackson announced that she had begun recording tracks for a new album, her first in 14 years. She performed throughout the U.S. with a setlist containing her best-known songs, some of her brothers' songs, and some Motown classics.

== Personal life ==
Jackson's announcement when she was 18, that she wanted to marry her childhood love Nathaniel Brown in November 1968 created division in the Jackson family. Jackson expressed her feelings for him and proclaimed that she wanted to move with him to Kentucky. Katherine encouraged her to proceed, feeling that being a wife and mother were important roles for all of her daughters.

However, Joseph opposed the marriage; he wanted Rebbie to follow in her brothers' footsteps and become a singer. He felt that married life would stop her from becoming a success in the entertainment business. Jackson had taken clarinet, piano, and dance lessons in her childhood, but had no interest in a music career even though, according to Jermaine, she had won several singing contests performing duets with Jackie. Jackson expressed that a happy home was more comforting and secure than the instability of show business. Arguments ensued for several weeks before her father relented and allowed Jackson to marry Brown, but he refused to walk her down the aisle. Brown died of cancer on January 6, 2013.

Jackson and Brown had three children:

- Stacee Brown (b. May 5, 1971), married to songwriter and producer Rex Salas.
- Yashi Brown (b. January 18, 1977)
- Austin Brown (b. November 22, 1985)

== Discography ==
=== Albums ===
| Year | Album | Peak chart positions | | Worldwide sales |
| Year | Album | US | US R&B | Worldwide sales |
|---|---|---|---|---|
| 1984 | Centipede: Released: October 10, 1984; Labels: Columbia Records | 63 | 13 | |
| 1986 | Reaction: Released: October 7, 1986; Labels: Columbia | — | 54 | |
| 1988 | R U Tuff Enuff: Released: February 1, 1988; Labels: Columbia | — | 58 | 300,000 |
| 1998 | Yours Faithfully: Released: March 31, 1998; Labels: MJJ Productions/Epic Records | 50 | 38 | 285,000 |

=== Singles ===
| Year | Single | Peak chart positions | | | | | Certifications (sales thresholds) | Album |
| Year | Single | US R&B | US | AUS | NZ | UK | Certifications (sales thresholds) | Album |
|---|---|---|---|---|---|---|---|---|
| 1984 | "Centipede" | 4 | 24 | 97 | 4 | — | US: Gold | Centipede |
| 1985 | "A Fork in the Road" | 40 | — | — | — | — | | Centipede |
| 1986 | "Reaction" | 16 | — | — | — | — | | Reaction |
| 1987 | "You Send the Rain Away" | 50 | — | — | — | — | | Reaction |
| 1988 | "Plaything" | 8 | — | — | — | — | | R U Tuff Enuff |
| 1988 | "R U Tuff Enuff" | 78 | — | — | — | — | | R U Tuff Enuff |
| 1989 | "2300 Jackson Street" (the Jacksons featuring Michael, Janet and Marlon Jackson) | 9 | — | — | — | — | | 2300 Jackson Street |
| 1998 | "Yours Faithfully" | 40 | — | — | — | 76 | | Yours Faithfully |
