= Billboard Year-End Hot R&B Singles of 1991 =

American music chart

This is a list of Billboard magazine's Top Hot R&B Singles of 1991.

No.	Title	Artist(s)
1	"Written All Over Your Face"	The Rude Boys
2	"Love Makes Things Happen"	Pebbles and Babyface
3	"Gonna Make You Sweat (Everybody Dance Now)"	C+C Music Factory
4	"I Like the Way (The Kissing Game)"	Hi-Five
5	"Can You Stop the Rain"	Peabo Bryson
6	"How Can I Ease the Pain"	Lisa Fischer
7	"Let the Beat Hit 'Em"	Lisa Lisa and Cult Jam
8	"The First Time"	Surface
9	"I Can't Wait Another Minute"	Hi-Five
10	"Something in My Heart"	Michel'le
11	"It Never Rains (In Southern California)"	Tony! Toni! Toné!
12	"Addictive Love"	BeBe & CeCe Winans
13	"Love Me Down"	Freddie Jackson
14	"Baby I'm Ready"	LeVert
15	"Do Me Again"	Freddie Jackson
16	"You Don't Have to Worry"	En Vogue
17	"Only Human"	Jeffrey Osborne
18	"All the Man That I Need"	Whitney Houston
19	"I'll Give All My Love to You"	Keith Sweat
20	"Wrap My Body Tight"	Johnny Gill
21	"Summertime"	DJ Jazzy Jeff & the Fresh Prince
22	"Sensitivity"	Ralph Tresvant
23	"Motownphilly"	Boyz II Men
24	"Miracle"	Whitney Houston
25	"Tender Kisses"	Tracie Spencer
26	"It Should've Been You"	Teddy Pendergrass
27	"Don't Go"	En Vogue
28	"Iesha"	Another Bad Creation
29	"It's So Hard to Say Goodbye to Yesterday"	Boyz II Men
30	"Forever My Lady"	Jodeci
31	"I Don't Wanna Lose Your Love"	B Angie B
32	"Emotions"	Mariah Carey
33	"Special"	Vesta
34	"Power of Love/Love Power"	Luther Vandross
35	"I Wanna Sex You Up"	Color Me Badd
36	"Men"	Gladys Knight
37	"With You"	Tony Terry
38	"Exclusivity"	Damian Dame
39	"So Much Love"	B Angie B
40	"I Adore Mi Amor"	Color Me Badd
41	"I'm Dreamin'"	Christopher Williams
42	"O.P.P."	Naughty by Nature
43	"Don't Wanna Change the World"	Phyllis Hyman
44	"Call Me"	Phil Perry
45	"Running Back to You"	Vanessa Williams
46	"Love Will Never Do (Without You)"	Janet Jackson
47	"Never Stop"	The Brand New Heavies featuring N'Dea Davenport
48	"Around the Way Girl"	LL Cool J
49	"Don't Want to Be a Fool"	Luther Vandross
50	"Do What I Gotta Do"	Ralph Tresvant
51	"Whatever You Want"	Tony! Toni! Toné!
52	"Kissing You"	Keith Washington
53	"When Will I See You Smile Again?"	Bell Biv DeVoe
54	"Optimistic"	Sounds of Blackness
55	"Keep On Lovin' Me"	The O'Jays
56	"Stone Cold Gentleman"	Ralph Tresvant
57	"Main Course"	Freddie Jackson
58	"All Season"	LeVert
59	"Don't Let Me Down"	The O'Jays
60	"Romantic"	Karyn White
61	"Someday"	Mariah Carey
62	"Gotta Have You"	Stevie Wonder
63	"Hold You Tight"	Tara Kemp
64	"Do Me Right"	Guy featuring Heavy D
65	"Right Down to It"	Damian Dame
66	"Wanna Get With U"	Guy
67	"If I Were a Bell"	Teena Marie
68	"Get Here"	Oleta Adams
69	"Let's Chill"	Guy
70	"In Your Eyes"	Shirley Murdock
71	"Why Can't You Come Home"	Ex Girlfriend
72	"I Don't Wanna Cry"	Mariah Carey
73	"Housecall"	Shabba Ranks featuring Maxi Priest
74	"Emotionally Yours"	The O'Jays
75	"All True Man"	Alexander O'Neal
76	"This House"	Tracie Spencer
77	"Your Love Part 2"	Keith Sweat
78	"Playground"	Another Bad Creation
79	"I'm Your Baby Tonight"	Whitney Houston
80	"Now That We Found Love"	Heavy D & the Boyz
81	"Are You Lonely for Me"	The Rude Boys
82	"Backyard"	Pebbles featuring Salt-n-Pepa
83	"Gett Off"	Prince and the New Power Generation
84	"Love Me Just for Me"	Special Generation
85	"Never Been in Love Before"	Marva Hicks
86	"Fairy Tales"	Anita Baker
87	"Nights Like This"	After 7
88	"My Heart Is Failing Me"	Riff
89	"No Matter What You Do"	Al B. Sure! and Diana Ross
90	"Don't Be a Fool"	Loose Ends
91	"Fun Day"	Stevie Wonder
92	"I'm on Your Side"	Jennifer Holliday
93	"Getting Back into Love"	Gerald Alston
94	"Here We Go (Let's Rock & Roll)"	C+C Music Factory
95	"If You're Serious"	Riff
96	"I Don't Know Anybody Else"	Black Box
97	"It's a Shame (My Sister)"	Monie Love featuring True Image
98	"Save Me"	Lisa Fischer
99	"Round and Round"	Tevin Campbell
100	"Head Over Heels"	Tony Terry

== See also ==
- 1991 in music
- Billboard Year-End Hot 100 singles of 1991
- Billboard Year-End Hot Rap Singles of 1991
- List of Hot R&B Singles number ones of 1991
