= Pebbles discography =

Pebblese discography
- Studio albums: 4
- Compilation albums: 1

This article contains the discography of American R&B singer Perri "Pebbles" Reid. This includes studio albums, compilation albums, and singles.

== Albums ==
=== Studio albums ===
List of albums, with selected chart positions and certifications
Title	Album details	Peak chart positions							Certifications
Title	Album details	US	US R&B	US Gos	CAN	JPN	NLD	UK	Certifications
Pebbles	Released: November 16, 1987; Label: MCA	14	5	—	43	—	56	56	RIAA: Platinum
Always	Released: September 11, 1990; Label: MCA	37	12	—	68	—	—	—	RIAA: Gold
Straight from My Heart	Released: September 12, 1995; Label: MCA	146	43	—	—	83	—	—	
Prophetic Flows Vol I & II^{[A]}	Released: February 8, 2008; Label: Angel Child	—	—	12	—	—	—	—	
"—" denotes a recording that did not chart or was not released in that territory.

- ^{A} Album credited to Sister Perri.

=== Compilation albums ===
- Greatest Hits (2000, Hip-O)

== Singles ==
=== As main performer ===
Year	Single	Peak chart positions										Album
Year	Single	US	US R&B	US Dan	US A/C	AUS	CAN	IRE	NLD	NZ	UK	Album
1987	"Love/Hate"	—	—	34	—	—	—	—	—	—	—	Pebbles
1987	"Girlfriend"	5	1	24	—	86	17	9	23	22	8	Pebbles
1988	"Mercedes Boy"	2	1	2	—	—	14	—	39	50	42	Pebbles
1988	"Take Your Time"	—	3	41	—	—	—	—	—	—	—	Pebbles
1988	"Do Me Right"	—	67	—	—	—	—	—	—	—	—	Pebbles
1990	"Giving You the Benefit"	4	1	10	—	48	32	—	32	26	73	Always
1990	"Love Makes Things Happen" (with Babyface)	13	1	—	24	—	91	—	—	—	—	Always
1991	"Backyard" (with Salt-N-Pepa)	73	4	—	—	—	—	—	—	—	111	Always
1991	"Always"	—	13	—	—	—	—	—	—	—	—	Always
1995	"Are You Ready?"	—	38	—	—	—	—	—	—	—	—	Straight from My Heart
2008	"Let Freedom Reign" ^{[B]}	—	—	—	—	—	—	—	—	—	—	Prophetic Flows Vol. I & II
2008	"Healing Waters" ^{[B]}	—	—	—	—	—	—	—	—	—	—	Non-album single
"—" denotes a recording that did not chart or was not released in that territory.

- ^{B} Single credited to Sister Perri.

=== As featured performer ===
Year	Title	Artist	Peak positions		Album
Year	Title	Artist	US	US R&B	Album
1995	"Freedom (Theme from Panther)"	Various Artists	45	18	Panther

== Music videos ==
Year	Video	Director
1987	"Girlfriend"	
1988	"Mercedes Boy"	
1989	"Do Me Right"	
1990	"Giving You the Benefit"	Steven T. Miller/R. Brad Murano
1991	"Love Makes Things Happen"	
1991	"Backyard"	
1995	"Are You Ready?"	
