= L.A. Reid discography =

The following is a list of recordings which have been worked on by musician, songwriter, and record producer L.A. Reid.

== Discography ==
=== 1977 ===
- "Third Rock" – Pure Essence (by then known simply as Essence, as featured on WEBN – The Album Project #2) – Drums, Percussion

=== 1983 ===
- Street Beat – The Deele – Drums, Vocals (Background)

=== 1985 ===
- Material Thangz – The Deele – Percussion, Drums [LinnDrum, Oberheim DMX], Producer, Programming

=== 1986 ===
- Lovers – Babyface – Mixing, Producer, Composer
- Daydreamin' – Dynasty – Drums [LinnDrum], Percussion, Producer

=== 1987 ===
- Circumstantial Evidence – Shalamar – Drums, Programming
- Just Gets Better with Time – The Whispers – Drums, Percussion, Producer
- Pebbles – Pebbles – Producer, Vocals (Background), Musician
- Eyes of a Stranger – The Deele – Producer, Musician (Drums)

=== 1988 ===
- Don't Be Cruel – Bobby Brown – Producer
- Karyn White – Karyn White – Vocals (Background), Drums, Producer, Percussion
- Forever Your Girl – Paula Abdul – Producer, Percussion Programming, Drums [Linn LM-1], Composer
- The Mac Band featuring the McCampbell Brothers – The Mac Band – Drums [Linn 9000], Producer
- The Lover in Me – Sheena Easton – Producer, Percussion, Drums [Linn 9000], Mixing, Composer
- Dial My Heart, Lucky Charm, & A Little Romance – The Boys – Producer
- (Tell Me) Do You Want My Love – Dynasty – Producer

=== 1989 ===
- 2300 Jackson Street – The Jacksons – Producer, Composer, Mixing, Drums, Percussion, Programming
- Every Little Step – Bobby Brown – Producer, Composer, Remixing, Programming
- Ghostbusters II – Various Artists – Producer, Composer, Drums [Linn 9000]
- Tender Lover – Babyface – Percussion, Programming, Stylist, Executive Producer, Producer, Drums [Linn 9000], Composer
- After 7 – After 7 – Technical Assistance, Producer, Programming, Mixing, Drums [Linn 9000], Percussion, Executive Producer
- Rock Wit'cha – Bobby Brown – Producer, Remixing, Multi Instruments

=== 1990 ===
- Always – Pebbles – Vocal Arrangement, Executive Producer, Rhythm Arrangements, Drums, Remixing, Mixing, Percussion, Vocals (Background), Composer, Producer
- The Boys – The Boys – Mixing
- Dance!...Ya Know It! – Bobby Brown – Remixing, Producer, Composer
- I'm Your Baby Tonight – Whitney Houston – Percussion, Mixing, Rhythm Arrangements, Drums, Vocal Arrangement, Producer, Rhythm, Vocals, Arranger
- Johnny Gill – Johnny Gill – Drums, Producer, Executive Producer, Mixing, Percussion
- Shut Up and Dance: Dance Mixes – Paula Abdul – Producer

=== 1991 ===
- Damian Dame – Damian Dame – Producer, Percussion, Vocal Arrangement, Drum Programming, Reissue Producer, Executive Producer, Mixing, Rhythm Arrangements
- You Said – Jermaine Jackson – Programming, Drum Programming, Mixing, Executive Producer, Remixing, Producer, Percussion

=== 1992 ===
- Bobby – Bobby Brown – Multi Instruments, Producer, Composer
- Bodyguard – Whitney Houston/Original Soundtrack – Producer, Composer, Instruments
- Takin' My Time – After 7 – Drum Programming, Drums
- Ooooooohhh... On the TLC Tip – TLC – Executive Producer, Drum Programming, Percussion, Mixing, Composer
- Boomerang – Original Soundtrack – Executive Producer, Producer, Percussion, Composer, Drum Programming, Drums
- 1746DCGA30035 – Highland Place Mobsters – Executive Producer, Producer, Instruments

=== 1993 ===
- Remixes N the Key of B – Bobby Brown – Producer, Remixing
- Provocative – Johnny Gill – Producer, Drums
- Poetic Justice – Original Soundtrack – Producer
- Hootie Mack – Bell Biv DeVoe – Multi Instruments, Producer
- Toni Braxton – Toni Braxton – Producer, Executive Producer, Drum Programming, Drums, Mixing
- For the Cool in You – Babyface – Producer, Drum Programming
- LaFace Family Christmas [Arista] – La Face Artists – Producer, Drums, Drum Programming, Executive Producer

=== 1994 ===
- Tribute to Curtis Mayfield [Warner Bros.] – Various Artists – Mixing, Percussion, Producer, Drum Programming
- Greatest Hits (1980-1994) – Aretha Franklin – Drum Programming, Producer
- Southernplayalisticadillacmuzik – OutKast – Executive Producer
- II – Boyz II Men – Producer
- Usher – Usher – Executive Producer
- CrazySexyCool – TLC – Executive Producer

=== 1995 ===
- Many Ways – Usher Raymond – Executive Producer
- Take a Dip – A Few Good Men – Drum Programming, Executive Producer, Mixing, Drums, Percussion
- Brainchild – Society of Soul – Executive Producer
- Words – Tony Rich – Executive Producer
- Soul Food – Goodie Mob – Executive Producer

=== 1996 ===
- In the Hood – Donell Jones – Executive Producer
- Knocks Me Off My Feet [#1] – Donell Jones – Executive Producer
- Knocks Me Off My Feet [#2] – Donell Jones – Executive Producer
- Last Night [US #2] – Az Yet – Executive Producer
- My Heart – Donell Jones – Executive Producer
- Rhythm of the Games: 1996 Olympic Games Album – Various Artists – Executive Producer
- Secrets – Toni Braxton – Vocal Arrangement, Executive Producer, Vocal Arrangement
- You're Makin' Me High [US] – Toni Braxton – Executive Producer
- ATLiens – OutKast – Executive Producer
- Az Yet – Az Yet – Executive Producer
- Un-Break My Heart – Toni Braxton – Vocal Arrangement, Executive Producer

=== 1997 ===
- After 12, Before 6 – Sam Salter – Executive Producer
- I Don't Want To [#1] – Toni Braxton – Executive Producer
- What About Us [#1] – Total – Executive Producer
- My Way – Usher – Executive Producer
- Nice & Slow [#1] – Usher – Executive Producer
- It's on Tonight – Sam Salter – Executive Producer
- We're Not Making Love No More – Dru Hill – Executive Producer

=== 1998 ===
- They Don't Dance No Mo' – Goodie Mob – Executive Producer
- Nice & Slow [#2] – Usher – Executive Producer
- Hymns – Corey Glover – Executive Producer
- Still Standing – Goodie Mob – Executive Producer
- Birdseye – Tony Rich – Executive Producer

=== 1999 ===
- FanMail – TLC – Executive Producer
- Shanice – Shanice – Executive Producer
- Live – Usher – Executive Producer, Composer
- R&B: From Doo Wop to Hip Hop – Various Artists – Producer
- Ultimate Grammy Box: From the Recording Academy's Collection – Various Artists – Producer

=== 2000 ===
- Can't Take Me Home – P!nk – Producer
- Greatest Hits – Whitney Houston – Producer, Composer
- Greatest Hits – Pebbles – Composer, Drums, Percussion
- Heat – Toni Braxton – Producer
- Shaft [2000] – Original Soundtrack – Producer
- Best of Bell Biv DeVoe – Bell Biv DeVoe – Producer
- Greatest Hits – Paula Abdul – Composer
- Spanish Guitar [Import CD #1] – Toni Braxton – Producer
- Collection of His Greatest Hits – Babyface – Drums, Drum Programming, Percussion, Producer
- Could I Have This Kiss Forever [Australia CD] – Whitney Houston – Producer
- Platinum Christmas – Various Artists – Producer
- Platinum Collection [La Face] – Various Artists – Executive Producer, Vocal Arrangement
- Soul Food – Original TV Soundtrack – Executive Producer

=== 2001 ===
- Love Songs – Babyface – Drums, Producer, Percussion
- Supernova – Lisa "Left Eye" Lopes – Executive Producer
- Face2Face – Babyface – Executive Producer
- Weekend – Kenny Lattimore – Executive Producer, Composer
- Snowflakes – Toni Braxton – Drums, Producer, Executive Producer
- Even in Darkness – Dungeon Family – Executive Producer
- So Blu – Blu Cantrell – Executive Producer
- Crown Royal – Run-D.M.C. – Executive Producer
- Love, Whitney – Whitney Houston – Executive Producer, Vocal Arrangement, Producer
- M!ssundaztood – P!nk – Executive Producer
- Big Boi and Dre Present...Outkast – OutKast – Executive Producer
- Bridget Jones's Diary, Vol. 2 – Various Artists – Producer, Executive Producer

=== 2002 ===
- Cee-Lo Green and His Perfect Imperfections – Cee-Lo Green – Executive Producer
- Ultimate Collection – Johnny Gill – Producer
- Don't Let Me Get Me [Australia CD] – P!nk – Executive Producer
- Let Go – Avril Lavigne – Executive Producer
- Life Goes On – Donell Jones – Executive Producer
- Full Circle – Boyz II Men – Executive Producer
- Left of Self-Centered – Butch Walker – Executive Producer
- Complicated – Avril Lavigne – Executive Producer
- Last Night [US #1] – Az Yet – Executive Producer
- Whatchulookinat – Whitney Houston – Executive Producer
- 20th Century Masters – The Millennium Collection: Motown 1980s, Vol. 2 – Various Artists – Producer, Composer
- Paradise – Kenny G – Executive Producer
- 3D – TLC – Executive Producer
- Girl Talk – TLC – Executive Producer
- Game of Love [Australia CD] – Santana – Executive Producer
- Wishes: A Holiday Album – Kenny G – Executive Producer
- More Than a Woman – Toni Braxton – Executive Producer
- Family Portrait – P!nk – Executive Producer
- Just Whitney – Whitney Houston – Executive Producer

=== 2003 ===
- Things That Lovers Do – Kenny Lattimore – Executive Producer
- My So-Called Life – From Zero – Executive Producer
- Essential Babyface – Babyface – Producer, Percussion, Drums
- Ultimate Kenny G – Kenny G – Executive Producer
- So Damn Happy – Aretha Franklin – Executive Producer
- Unstable – Adema -Executive Producer
- Speakerboxxx/The Love Below – OutKast – Executive Producer
- Ultimate Toni Braxton – Toni Braxton – Live Mixing, Producer, Composer
- Try This – P!nk – Executive Producer
- Best of After 7 – After 7 – Composer

=== 2004 ===
- The Greatest Hits of TLC – TLC – Compilation Producer, Audio Production
- Confessions [Special Edition] – Usher – Executive Producer

=== 2005 ===
- Pleasure & Pain – 112 – Executive Producer
- Breathe Again: Toni Braxton at Her Best – Toni Braxton – Composer
- 20th Century Masters – The Millennium Collection: The Best of Bobby Brown – Bobby Brown – Producer, Composer, Audio Production
- Let's Get It: Thug Motivation 101 – Young Jeezy – Executive Producer
- I'll Make Love to You – Boyz II Men – Producer, Composer
- Best of Soul Love: Luther Vandross/Marvin Gaye – Various Artists – Composer
- 20th Century Masters – The DVD Collection: The Best of Bobby Brown – Bobby Brown – Composer, Producer
- Other Side of Cool – Babyface – Remixing, Composer
- The Emancipation of Mimi – Mariah Carey – Executive Producer

=== 2006 ===
- Definitive Collection – Bobby Brown – Composer, Producer
- Gold – Gladys Knight – Composer
- Collection [3 Disc] – Toni Braxton – Vocal Arrangement, Producer
- Ultimate Collection – Shalamar – Producer, Composer
- Coming Home – Lionel Richie – Executive Producer
- Bobby – Original Soundtrack – Audio Production, Producer
- Kingdom Come – Jay-Z – Executive Producer

=== 2007 ===
- Essential Toni Braxton – Toni Braxton – Composer, Producer
- I Am – Chrisette Michele – Audio Production, Executive Producer
- Ultimate Collection – Whitney Houston – Producer
- American Gangster – Jay-Z – Executive Producer
- Super Hits – The Jackson 5 – Composer, Producer
- Song for You: Live – Whitney Houston – Composer

=== 2008 ===
- Super Hits – Babyface – Producer, Composer
- E=MC² – Mariah Carey – Executive Producer
- Year of the Gentleman – Ne-Yo – Executive Producer
- Nas – Nas – Executive Producer, Audio Production
- Recession – Young Jeezy – Executive Producer
- Tender Lover/For the Cool in You – Babyface – Percussion, Drums, Stylist, Producer, Composer

=== 2009 ===
- From the Heart – Babyface – Producer
- This Is the One – Utada – Executive Producer
- Can You Feel It: The Jacksons Collection – The Jackson 5 – Composer
- Gold – Bobby Brown – Producer, Remixing
- Just Go – Lionel Richie – Executive Producer
- Whitney Houston Smooth Jazz Tribute – Various Artists – Composer
- In Love & War – Amerie – Executive Producer
- Live from the Royal Albert Hall – The Killers – Executive Producer
- My World – Justin Bieber – Executive Producer
- Rated R – Rihanna – Executive Producer
- Memoirs of An Imperfect Angel – Mariah Carey – Executive Producer

=== 2010 ===
- My World 2.0 – Justin Bieber – Executive Producer
- Loud – Rihanna – Executive Producer
- My Beautiful Dark Twisted Fantasy – Kanye West – Executive Producer
- Libra Scale – Ne-Yo – Executive Producer
- Merry Christmas II You – Mariah Carey – Executive Producer

=== 2011 ===
- Love? – Jennifer Lopez – Executive Producer

=== 2013 ===
- Love and War – Tamar Braxton – Executive Producer
- Ciara – Ciara – Executive Producer
- Side Effects of You – Fantasia – Composer
- Avril Lavigne – Avril Lavigne – Executive Producer
- 20 – TLC – Executive Producer

=== 2014 ===
- Xscape – Michael Jackson – Executive Producer, Composer, Drums, Percussions, Vocal Producer, Compiler
- Think Like a Man Too – Mary J. Blige – Executive Producer

=== 2015 ===
- Calling All Lovers – Tamar Braxton – Executive Producer
