= List of Hot R&B Singles number ones of 1991 =

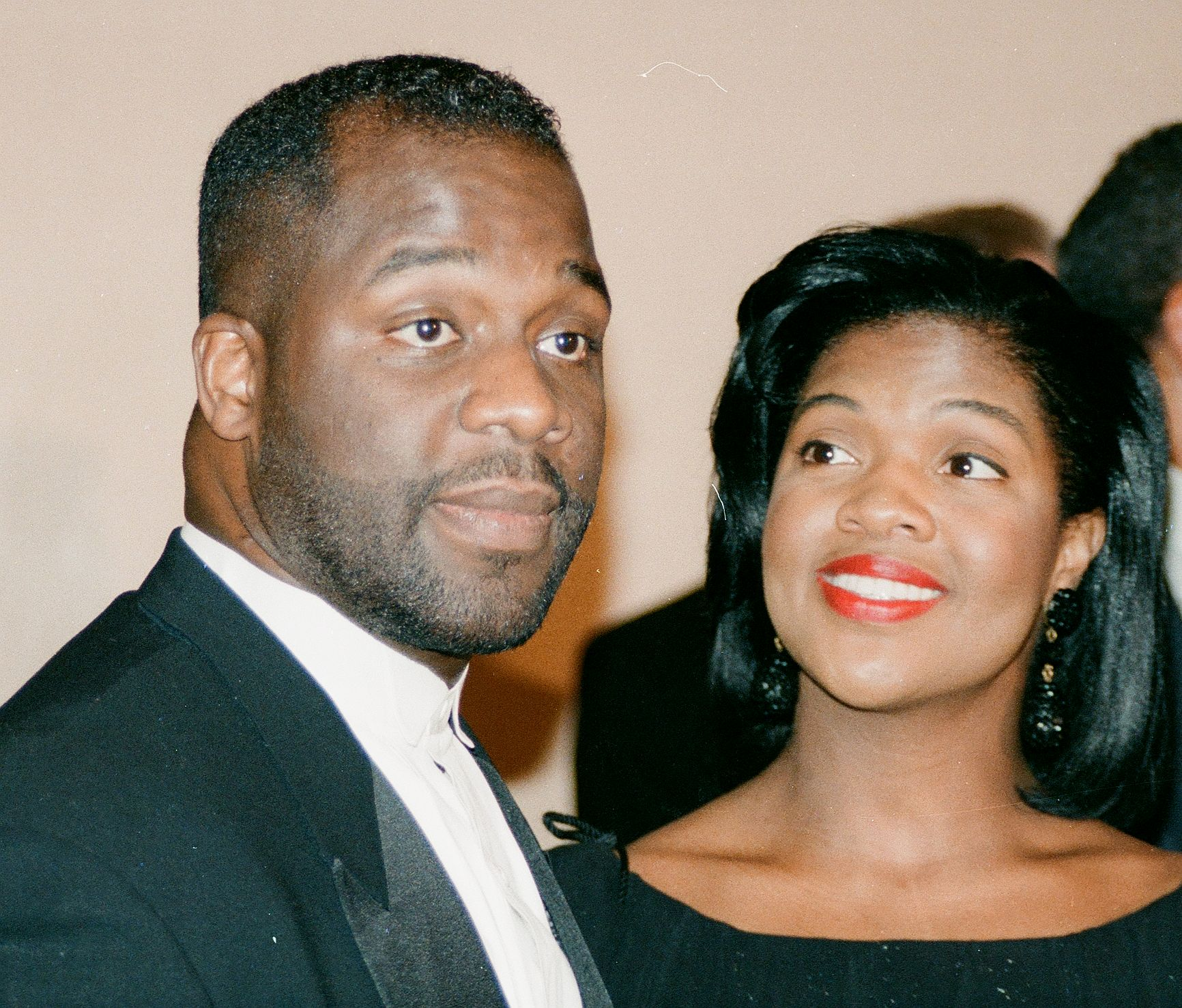
Sibling duo BeBe & CeCe Winans had two number ones in 1991.

Billboard published a weekly chart in 1991 ranking the top-performing singles in the United States in African American-oriented genres; the chart has undergone various name changes over the decades to reflect the evolution of black music and has been published as Hot R&B/Hip-Hop Songs since 2005. In 1991, it was published under the title Hot R&B Singles, and 38 different singles reached number one. In the issue of Billboard dated January 5, Freddie Jackson moved into the number one position with "Love Me Down", displacing "It Never Rains (In Southern California)" by Tony! Toni! Toné!. No song spent more than two weeks in the top spot during 1991, although Shanice's "I Love Your Smile", which spent the last two weeks of the year atop the chart, would extend its run by two further weeks in 1992.

Jackson, Color Me Badd, Hi-Five, and BeBe & CeCe Winans, each of whom had two number ones, tied for the highest number of weeks in the top spot during the year, spending three weeks atop the chart. The Rude Boys also had two chart-toppers in 1991 but both of their number ones spent only a single week in the peak position. Gerald Levert had one number one as a solo artist and another as a member of the trio LeVert. With the exception of Gerald Levert, who would achieve a second solo number one in 1992, none of the acts to top the chart twice during the year would achieve another R&B number one after 1991. Color Me Badd, Hi-Five, the Rude Boys, and the Winans siblings all achieved the only two R&B number ones of their respective careers during the year.

Ten acts reached number one on the chart for the first and only time in 1991, including Damian Dame, DJ Jazzy Jeff & the Fresh Prince, Lisa Fischer, Phil Perry, Shanice, and Christopher Williams. Phyllis Hyman gained her sole R&B number one with "Don't Wanna Change the World" more than fifteen years after she first entered the chart. Tracie Spencer, who was only one month old when Hyman achieved her first R&B chart entry, also reached the peak position for the first and only time in 1991. Keith Washington reached number one with "Kissing You", the first chart entry of his career, but it would prove to be the only time he even reached the top 10. "Gonna Make You Sweat (Everybody Dance Now)" by C+C Music Factory featuring Freedom Williams was the act's only R&B chart-topper but it continued to be popular for decades afterwards, being used in many films and TV shows. It was one of five of the year's R&B chart-toppers to also reach number one on Billboard's pop singles chart, the Hot 100, along with "I Adore Mi Amor" by Color Me Badd, "I Like the Way (The Kissing Game)" by Hi-Five, "The First Time" by Surface, and "All the Man That I Need" by Whitney Houston.

== Chart history ==
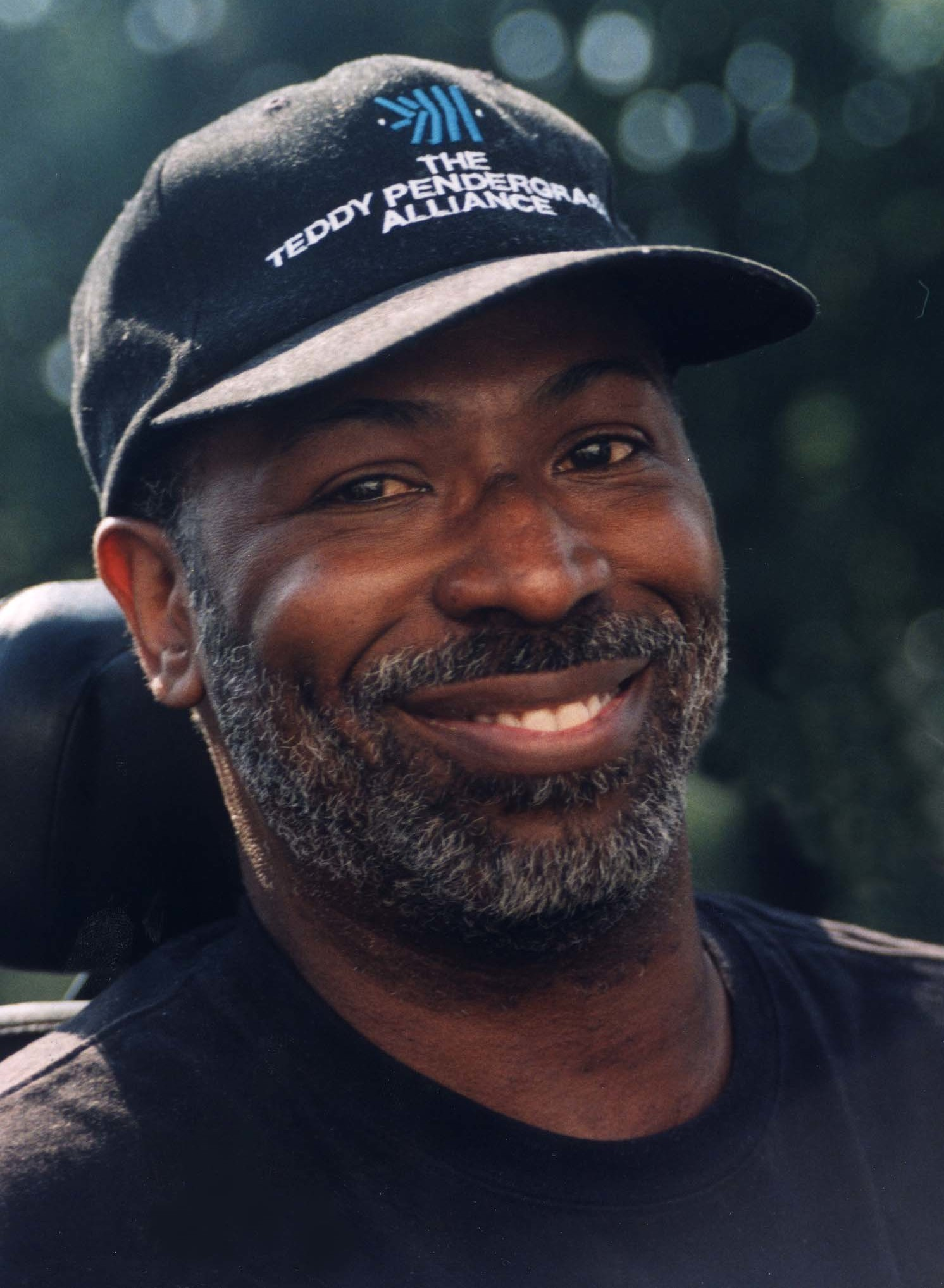
"It Should've Been You" was a chart-topper for Teddy Pendergrass.

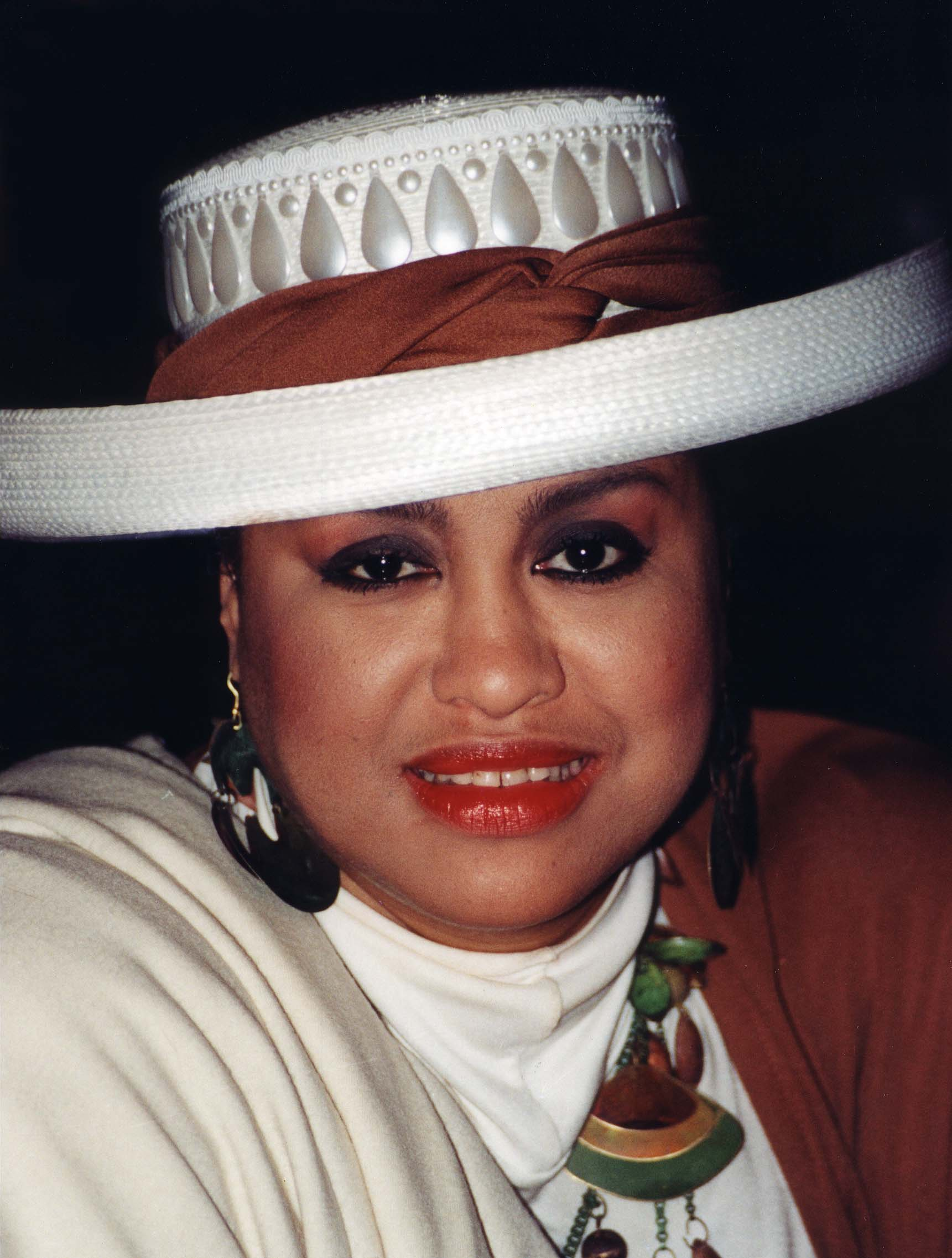
Phyllis Hyman gained her first R&B number one more than fifteen years after she first entered the chart.

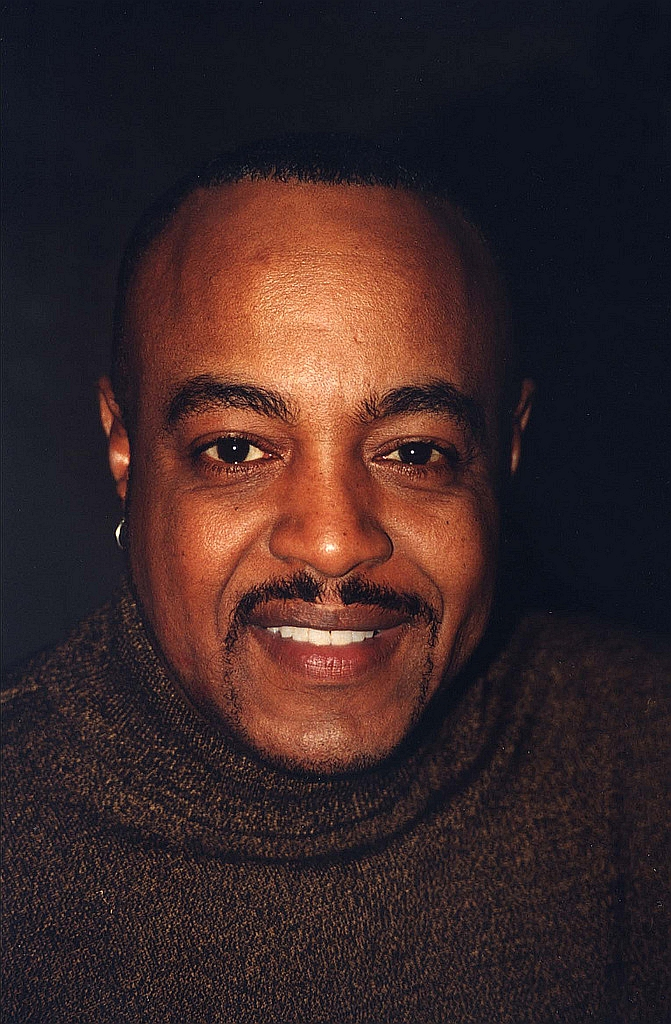
"Can You Stop the Rain" by Peabo Bryson was one of fourteen tracks to spend two weeks at number one in 1991.

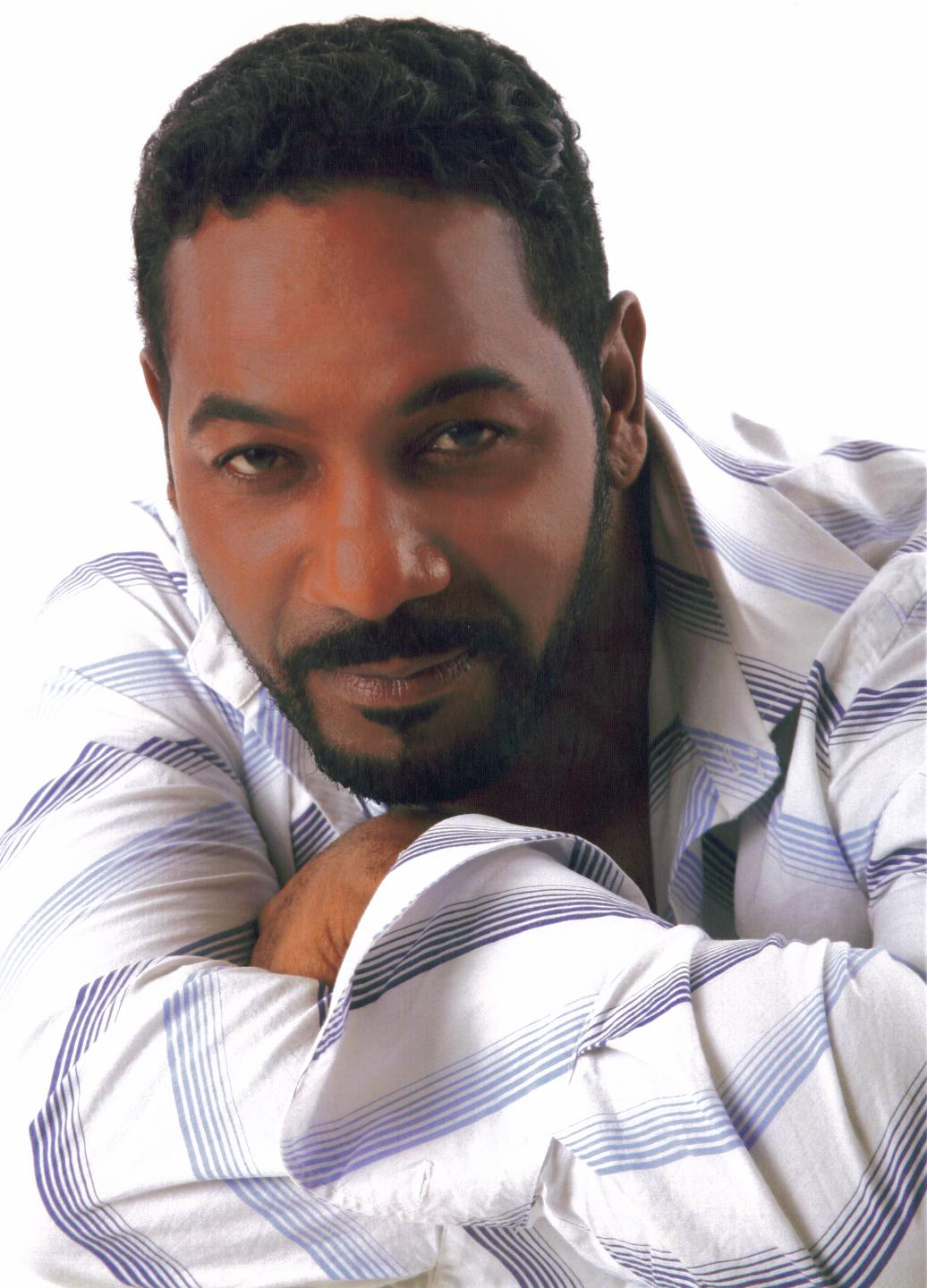
"Kissing You" was a chart-topper for Keith Washington.

Key
†	Indicates number 1 on Billboard's year-end R&B singles chart

Chart history
Issue date	Title	Artist(s)	Ref.
January 5	"Love Me Down"	Freddie Jackson	
January 12	"Love Me Down"	Freddie Jackson	
January 19	"The First Time"	Surface	
January 26	"Love Makes Things Happen"	Pebbles and Babyface	
February 2	"Love Makes Things Happen"	Pebbles and Babyface	
February 9	"You Don't Have to Worry"	En Vogue	
February 16	"I'll Give All My Love to You"	Keith Sweat	
February 23	"Gonna Make You Sweat (Everybody Dance Now)"	C+C Music Factory featuring Freedom Williams	
March 2	"All the Man That I Need"	Whitney Houston	
March 9	"All the Man That I Need"	Whitney Houston	
March 16	"Written All Over Your Face" †	The Rude Boys	
March 23	"I Like the Way (The Kissing Game)"	Hi-Five	
March 30	"I Like the Way (The Kissing Game)"	Hi-Five	
April 6	"Do Me Again"	Freddie Jackson	
April 13	"Wrap My Body Tight"	Johnny Gill	
April 20	"Whatever You Want"	Tony! Toni! Toné!	
April 27	"Whatever You Want"	Tony! Toni! Toné!	
May 4	"I'm Dreamin'"	Christopher Williams	
May 11	"Call Me"	Phil Perry	
May 18	"It Should've Been You"	Teddy Pendergrass	
May 25	"Kissing You"	Keith Washington	
June 1	"I Wanna Sex You Up"	Color Me Badd	
June 8	"I Wanna Sex You Up"	Color Me Badd	
June 15	"Power of Love/Love Power"	Luther Vandross	
June 22	"Power of Love/Love Power"	Luther Vandross	
June 29	"How Can I Ease the Pain"	Lisa Fischer	
July 6	"How Can I Ease the Pain"	Lisa Fischer	
July 13	"Exclusivity"	Damian Dame	
July 20	"Exclusivity"	Damian Dame	
July 27	"Baby I'm Ready"	LeVert	
August 3	"Summertime"	DJ Jazzy Jeff & the Fresh Prince	
August 10	"I Can't Wait Another Minute"	Hi-Five	
August 17	"Can You Stop the Rain"	Peabo Bryson	
August 24	"Can You Stop the Rain"	Peabo Bryson	
August 31	"Addictive Love"	BeBe & CeCe Winans	
September 7	"Addictive Love"	BeBe & CeCe Winans	
September 14	"Let the Beat Hit 'Em"	Lisa Lisa and Cult Jam	
September 21	"Don't Wanna Change the World"	Phyllis Hyman	
September 28	"I Adore Mi Amor"	Color Me Badd	
October 5	"Running Back to You"	Vanessa Williams	
October 12	"Running Back to You"	Vanessa Williams	
October 19	"Romantic"	Karyn White	
October 26	"It's So Hard to Say Goodbye to Yesterday"	Boyz II Men	
November 2	"Emotions"	Mariah Carey	
November 9	"Forever My Lady"	Jodeci	
November 16	"Forever My Lady"	Jodeci	
November 23	"Tender Kisses"	Tracie Spencer	
November 30	"Are You Lonely for Me"	The Rude Boys	
December 7	"I'll Take You There"	BeBe & CeCe Winans featuring Mavis Staples	
December 14	"Private Line"	Gerald Levert	
December 21	"I Love Your Smile"	Shanice	
December 28	"I Love Your Smile"	Shanice	

== See also ==
- 1991 in music
- Billboard Year-End Hot R&B Singles of 1991
- List of Billboard number-one R&B albums of 1991
- List of Billboard Hot 100 number ones of 1991
