= Messages from the Boys =

Studio album by the Boys
- Released: October 29, 1988
- Recorded: 1987–1988
- Genre: R&B
- Length: 45:50
- Label: Motown
- Producer: L.A. Reid (tracks 1–3), Babyface (tracks 1–3), Eddie Watkins, Jr. (tracks 4, 5, 7, 9 and 10), Craig Cooper (track 8), Vincent Brantley (track 6), Darryl "De Rock" Simmons (co-producer on track 1), Jeff Carruthers (co-producer on track 6), Kayo (co-producer on track 1), Pebbles (co-producer on tracks 2 and 3), B.J. Watkins (associate producer: tracks 4, 5, 7, 9 and 10), the Boys (associate producer on track 3)

The Boys chronology
Messages from the Boys (1988)	The Boys (1990)

Singles from Messages from the Boys
- 1. "Dial My Heart" Released: September 6, 1988; 2. "Lucky Charm" Released: January 6, 1989; 3. "Happy" Released: 1989; 4. "A Little Romance" Released: 1989

Messages from the Boys is the debut album by American R&B group the Boys (now known as Suns of Light). It was released in 1988.

== Track listing ==
1. "Dial My Heart" (Daryl Simmons, L.A. Reid, Babyface 4:25)
2. "Lucky Charm" (Simmons, Reid, Babyface, Greg Scelsa 4:00)
3. "A Little Romance" (Reid, Babyface, Sid Johnson, Bruce Robinson, Charles Muldrow Jr. 3:59)
4. "Sunshine" (Eddie Watkins 3:00)
5. "Love Gram" (Watkins, Otha Cole 4:10)
6. "Just For the Fun of It" (Jeff Carruthers, Vincent Brantley 5:30)
7. "Personality" (Watkins, Hakeem Abdulsamad 4:42)
8. "Be My Girl" (Scelsa, the Boys, Craig Cooper 4:30)
9. "Happy" (E. Watkins, Cole, Bee Jay Watkins 5:33)
10. "Let's Dance" (E. Watkins 6:01)

== Singles chart ==
- "Dial My Heart" #1 R&B 1988 [#13 Pop]
- "A Little Romance" #13 R&B
- "Lucky Charm" #1 R&B 1989
