= The Boys (American band the Boys album) =

Studio album by the Boys
- Released: September 18, 1990
- Recorded: 1989–1990
- Genre: R&B, New Jack Swing
- Length: 49:20
- Label: Motown
- Producer: Daryl Simmons, Kayo

The Boys chronology
Messages from the Boys (1988)	The Boys (1990)	The Saga Continues… (1992)

Singles from The Boys
- 1. "Crazy" Released: March 18, 1990; 2. "Thing Called Love" Released: September 14, 1990; 3. "Thanx 4 the Funk" Released: February 5, 1991; 4. "I Had a Dream" Released: 1991

Professional ratings
Review scores
Source	Rating
AllMusic	3/5 stars

The Boys is the second album from American R&B group Suns of Light (originally known as the Boys), released in September 18, 1990 via Motown Records. Although L.A. Reid and Babyface produced 3 songs on their debut album Messages from the Boys, instead one song is produced by Daryl Simmons and Kayo, who were a part of the LaFace production and songwriting camp.

Three singles were released from the album: "Crazy", "Thing Called Love" and "Thanx 4 the Funk". "Crazy" is the last song the group has released to date to reach #1 on the Billboard R&B chart, as well as the last song to date to chart on the Billboard Hot 100, peaking at #29.

The album peaked at #108 on the Billboard 200. In addition to original songs, it contains a cover of the Michael Jackson song "Got to Be There".

== Track listing ==
All tracks are written by The Boys except "Thing Called Love" written by Kayo Roberson and Daryl Simmons; and "Got to Be There" written by Elliot Willensky

No.	Title	Length
1.	"Dear Fans" (Intro)	0:42
2.	"Crazy"	5:06
3.	"Thing Called Love"	5:10
4.	"Compton" (Interlude)	0:26
5.	"Funny"	4:06
6.	"My Love"	6:27
7.	"What's for Dinner" (Interlude)	0:20
8.	"I Had a Dream"	4:09
9.	"Got to Be There" (Michael Jackson cover)	3:58
10.	"Interview" (Interlude)	0:08
11.	"Smpte"	3:56
12.	"Sir Nose" (Interlude)	0:33
13.	"Thanx 4 the Funk"	5:19
14.	"Hey Clown"	0:08
15.	"The Bush"	5:35
16.	"Strings 'N Things"	2:19
17.	"See Ya!" (Interlude)	0:52
Total length:		49:20

== Chart positions ==
Chart (1990)	Peak position
US Billboard 200	108
US R&B Albums (Billboard)	24
