= Exclusivity =

Exclusivity may refer to:

== Concepts ==
- Exclusivity (religion), the ubiquitous stance in religion of asserting unique veracity
- Mutual exclusivity, if two propositions or events cannot both be true
- Exclusive positioning, a marketing strategy
- Sexual and romantic exclusivity in committed relationships (monogamy)

== Regulations ==
- Exclusivity (law), rights to exclusivity
- Syndication exclusivity, US law giving protection of television station rights
- Test data exclusivity, confidentiality of medical data
- Console exclusivity, technical system limits to video games

== Other uses ==
- "Exclusivity" (song), 1991 R&B song by the duo Damian Dame
