= Should've Been You =

Should've Been You may refer to:

- "It Should've Been You", song by Teddy Pendergrass
- "Should've Been You", song by Imelda May from Life Love Flesh Blood
- It Shoulda Been You, 2015 Broadway musical
