= Dial My Heart =

Single by the Boys

from the album Messages from the Boys
- Released: September 6, 1988
- Recorded: 1988
- Genre: New jack swing
- Length: 4:22
- Label: Motown
- Songwriters: Babyface, L.A. Reid, Daryl Simmons
- Producers: L.A. Reid & Babyface

The Boys singles chronology
| "Dial My Heart" (1988) | "Lucky Charm" (1988) |

"Dial My Heart" is the 1988 debut single by the Boys The single on the Motown label was a crossover hit for the group, peaking at No. 1 on the Billboard R&B singles chart and No. 13 on the Billboard Hot 100 in 1988-1990. It was the group's only entry on the Dance chart, peaking at number 18.

The single entered the UK singles chart on November 5, 1988, rising to a high of number 61 during its four weeks on the chart.

== Charts ==
| Chart (1988–1989) | Peak position |
|---|---|
| UK Singles Chart (OCC) | 61 |
| US Billboard Hot 100 (Billboard) | 13 |
| US Hot R&B Singles Chart (Billboard) | 1 |
| US Hot Dance Club Play (Billboard) | 18 |
