= Are You Lonely for Me =

Are You Lonely for Me may refer to:

- "Are You Lonely for Me" (Freddie Scott song), 1966
- "Are You Lonely for Me" (The Rude Boys song), 1991
