= The Saga Continues =

The Saga Continues may refer to:

- The Saga Continues... (Roger Troutman album), 1984
- The Saga Continues... (The Boys album), 1992
- The Saga Continues..., 2001 album by P. Diddy and The Bad Boy Family
- The Saga Continues (Wu-Tang Clan album), 2017

== See also ==
- Da Saga Continues, a 1996 album by Trinity Garden Cartel
