= Crazy (The Boys song) =

1990 single by the Boys

Single by The Boys

from the album The Boys
- Released: March 18, 1990
- Recorded: 1989
- Length: 5:06
- Label: Motown
- Songwriters: Khiry Abdulsamad, Hakeem Abdulsamad, Tajh Abdulsamad, Bilal Abdulsamad

The Boys singles chronology
"A Little Romance" (1989)	"Crazy" (1990)	"Thing Called Love" (1990)

"Crazy" is an R&B song written and recorded by The Boys for their self-titled second album. Released as a single, the song spent one week at number one on the US R&B singles chart and peaked at number twenty-nine on the Billboard Hot 100.

== Music video ==
At the beginning of the video, eldest brother Khiry is accidentally kicked in the back of the head during a dance rehearsal and begins to have the "craziest dream". His dream is a series of music video spoofs which include in order: "Faith" by George Michael, "Every Little Step" by Bobby Brown, "Vogue" by Madonna, "Rhythm Nation" by Janet Jackson, "Thriller" by Michael Jackson, and "Baby Don't Forget My Number" by Milli Vanilli. He then wakes up just as the nurse appears.

== Charts ==
Chart (1990–91)	Peak position
Australia (ARIA Charts)	65
US Billboard 100	29

== See also ==
- List of number-one R&B singles of 1990 (U.S.)
