= All My Love (Peabo Bryson album) =

Studio album by Peabo Bryson
- Released: May 23, 1989
- Studio: Cheshire Sound Studios (Atlanta, Georgia); Sigma Sound Studios (Philadelphia, Pennsylvania); Aire L.A. Studios (Glendale, California)
- Genre: R&B; pop rock
- Length: 49:33
- Label: Capitol
- Producer: Peabo Bryson; Nick Martinelli; Sir Gant; Dwight W. Watkins

Peabo Bryson chronology
Positive (1988)	All My Love (1989)	Can You Stop the Rain (1991)

All My Love is the fourteenth studio album by American singer Peabo Bryson. It was released by Capitol Records in May 1989 in the United States. The album marked Bryson's first release with the label after four years with Elektra Records.

== Critical reception ==
Professional ratings
Review scores
Source	Rating
AllMusic	3/5 stars

AllMusic reviewer Ron Wynn called All My Love "immediate and satisfying. This album was not only one of his strongest in many years, but such songs as "Show and Tell" and "Palm of Your Hand" got widespread urban contemporary airplay, and D'atra Hicks got a career boost from doing a duet with Bryson on the album."

== Track listing ==
No.	Title	Writer(s)	Producer(s)	Length
1.	""Show and Tell""	Jerry Fuller	Peabo Bryson; Sir Gant	4:38
2.	"All My Love"	Bryson	Bryson; Dwight W. Watkins; Sir Gant	5:26
3.	"Lover's Paradise"	Bryson	Bryson; Sir Gant	4:32
4.	"Palm of Your Hand" (duet with D'atra Hicks)	Jon Rosen; Karen Manno	Nick Martinelli	4:12
5.	"When You're in Love"	Bryson	Bryson; Watkins; Sir Gant	4:28
6.	"One Time for the Lonely"	Watkins; Bryson	Bryson; Watkins; Sir Gant	5:00
7.	"Life Goes On"	Carvin Winans; Leroy Hyter	Bryson; Sir Gant	4:48
8.	"True Love"	Watkins; Bryson	Bryson; Watkins; Sir Gant	4:28
9.	"Meant to Be"	Bryson	Bryson; Watkins; Sir Gant	4:29
10.	"Like I Need You" (duet with Jasmine Guy)	Bryson	Bryson; Watkins	4:28

== Personnel and credits ==
Musicians

- Peabo Bryson – vocals, electric piano (9), keyboards (10), synthesizers (10)
- Sir Dean Gant – synthesizers (1–3, 6), Synclavier (1–3, 5–9), drums (1–3, 5, 6, 8, 9), percussion (1–3, 5, 6, 8, 9), acoustic piano (3, 5, 6), Synclavier drums (10)
- Randy Cantor – keyboards (4), drums (4)
- Odeen Mays – keyboards (4), drums (4), vibraphone solo (4)
- Dwight W. Watkins – electric piano (6), additional programming (10), percussion (10)
- Rick Sheppard – additional programming (6, 10)
- Paul Jackson Jr. – lead guitar (1–3, 5–10)
- Randy Bowland – lead guitar (4)
- Leon "Ndugu" Chancler – drum overdubs (1–9) cymbals (1–9)
- Marc Freeman – drum overdubs (10) cymbals (10)
- Gerald Albright – saxophone solo (1–7, 10)
- Larry Jackson – saxophone solo (8, 9)
- Alex Brown – backing vocals (1–3, 5–10)
- Carl Caldwell – backing vocals (1–3, 5–10)
- Alice Echols – backing vocals (1–3, 5–10)
- Angel Edwards – backing vocals (1–3, 5–10)
- Josie James – backing vocals (1–3, 5–10)
- Marlena Jeter – backing vocals (1–3, 5–10)
- Marva King – backing vocals (1–3, 5–10)
- D'atra Hicks – vocals (4)
- Regina Belle – backing vocals (4)
- Cynthia Biggs – backing vocals (4)
- Chris Walker – backing vocals (4)
- Steve Wise – backing vocals (4)
- Jasmine Guy – vocals (10)

Music arrangements

- Dean Gant – rhythm arrangements (1, 3, 5, 7–9), synthesizer arrangements (2, 5), string arrangements (2, 5, 9), BGV arrangements (5)
- Alex Brown – BGV arrangements (1–3, 7–9)
- Peabo Bryson – rhythm arrangements (2, 3, 6, 10), BGV arrangements (8–10)
- Dwight W. Watkins – rhythm arrangements (2, 5, 6, 8–10), BGV arrangements (8–10)
- Curt Dowd – arrangements (4)
- Nick Martinelli – arrangements (4)
- Jim Salamone – arrangements (4)

Production

- Step Johnson – executive producer
- Tom Vickers – executive producer
- Thom Kidd – recording (1–3, 5–10), mixing (1–3, 5–10)
- Peabo Bryson – mixing (1–3, 5–10)
- Sir Dean Gant – mixing (1–3, 5–10)
- Dwight W. Watkins – mixing (1–3, 5–10)
- Bruce Weedon – recording (4), mixing (4)
- Tom Pee – recording assistant (1–3, 5–10)
- Craig Burbidge – additional engineer (1–3, 5–10)
- Gregg Barrett – additional assistant engineer (1–3, 5–10)
- Rob Siefert – additional assistant engineer (1–3, 5–10)
- Carol Friedman – art direction, photography
- Amy Dakos – design
- John Kosh – design
- Danyelle McRae – grooming
- Ellen Silverstein – stylist
- David M. Franklin & Associates – management

== Charts ==
Chart (1989)	Peak position
US Top R&B/Hip-Hop Albums (Billboard)	27
