= Backyard (Pebbles song) =

Single by Pebbles and Salt-N-Pepa

from the album Always
- Released: March 12, 1991
- Recorded: 1989 (LP version); 1991 (Outta The Hood version)
- Studio: Elumba Recording Studios (Hollywood, Los Angeles, California)
- Genre: New jack swing
- Length: 4:13 (7” version); 5:56 (LP version); 7:07 (12” Outta The Hood version); 7:55 (12” Uptown Club version)
- Label: MCA
- Songwriters: Kenneth Edmonds; Antonio Reid; Cheryl James
- Producers: L.A. Reid; Babyface; Dallas Austin

Pebbles and Salt-N-Pepa singles chronology
"Love Makes Things Happen" (1990)	"Backyard" (1991)	"Always" (1991)

Music video
- "Backyard" on YouTube

"Backyard" is a song by American recording artist Pebbles, featuring a guest rap by Salt-N-Pepa. Taken from Pebbles' second album, Always (1990), the song was released as the third single from the album on March 12, 1991 by MCA Records.

== Music video ==
Pebbles highlights rigors of other women coming between her partner and the need to look out for your significant other, against those interfering parties. The video starts with T-Boz of pre-TLC fame pointing out to Pebbles, that another woman is courting her boyfriend. Being later signed to Reid's Pebbitone management on February 28, 1991 as the music group TLC, this was both Tionne Watkins' and Lisa Lopes' first music video appearances.

Bernadette Cooper of the group Klymaxx also appears in the video playing the drums.

== Charts ==
Chart (1991)	Peak position
UK Singles (OCC)	111
UK Dance (Music Week)	54
US Billboard Hot 100	73
US Hot R&B Singles (Billboard)	4
