= Always (Pebbles album) =

Studio album by Pebbles
- Released: September 11, 1990
- Recorded: 1989–1990
- Studio: Various: Elumba Recording Studios, Skip Saylor Recording, Summa Music Group, Wide Tracks Studios and Galaxy Sound Studios (Hollywood, California); Encore Studios (Burbank, California); Soundscape Studios and Cheshire Sound Studios (Atlanta, Georgia); Electric Lady Studios (New York, New York)
- Genres: Contemporary R&B; New jack swing
- Length: 53:23
- Label: MCA
- Producers: L.A. Reid; Babyface; Daryl Simmons; Kayo; Pebbles

Pebbles chronology
Pebbles (1987)	Always (1990)	Straight from My Heart (1995)

Singles from Always
- 1. "Giving You the Benefit" Released: August 11, 1990; 2. "Love Makes Things Happen" Released: November 6, 1990; 3. "Backyard" Released: March 12, 1991; 4. "Always" Released: June 10, 1991

Professional ratings
Review scores
Source	Rating
AllMusic	3/5 stars
Entertainment Weekly	C−

Always is the second studio album by American recording artist Pebbles. It was released on September 11, 1990, by MCA Records and spawned two Top 20 hits on the U.S. Hot 100, which also hit #1 on the R&B chart: "Giving You the Benefit" (US #4 pop, #1 R&B) and "Love Makes Things Happen" (a duet with Babyface, US #13 pop, #1 R&B), as well as the top-five R&B hit "Backyard" (featuring Salt-N-Pepa), and the top 20 R&B hit "Always".

== Track listing ==
Side one
No.	Title	Writer(s)	Length
1.	"Giving You the Benefit"	Kenneth Edmonds, Antonio Reid	5:41
2.	"Backyard" (featuring Salt-N-Pepa)	Edmonds, Reid, Cheryl James	5:56
3.	"Love Makes Things Happen" (with Babyface)	Edmonds, Reid	5:10
4.	"Say a Prayer for Me"	Edmonds, Reid	5:15
5.	"Why Do I Believe" (Prelude)	Edmonds	1:05

Side two
No.	Title	Writer(s)	Length
6.	"Give It to Me"	Edmonds, Reid	4:10
7.	"Why Do I Believe"	Edmonds	3:53
8.	"Always"	Danny Sembello, Pebbles	5:33
9.	"Stay with Me"	Kevin Roberson, Daryl Simmons, Pebbles	4:38
10.	"Good Thang"	Edmonds, Reid, Roberson, Simmons, Pebbles	4:25

CD bonus track
No.	Title	Writer(s)	Length
11.	"Giving You the Benefit" (Extended Club Mix)	Edmonds, Reid	7:41

== Production ==
- L.A. & Babyface – executive producers, producers (1–8)
- Pebbles – executive producer, co-producer (8)
- Daryl Simmons & Kayo – producers (9, 10)
- Jon Gass – recording (1–9), mix engineer, mixing
- Jimmy Dutt – recording (4, 10)
- L.A. Reid – mixing
- Ron Christopher, Ryan Dorn, Jimmy Dutt, Thom "TK" Kidd and Barney Perkins – additional engineers
- Michael Alvord, Steve Battle, Mike Baumgartner, Kyle Bess, Rich Caughron, Jim Champagne, Milton Chan, Ross Donaldson, Fred Law, Ted Malia, Joe Shay, Donnell Sullivan, Michael White, Bill Zalin and Jim "Z" Zumpano – assistant engineers
- Donnell Sullivan – mix assistant
- Eddy Schreyer – mastering at Future Disc (Hollywood, California)
- Donald Parks – production manager
- Zetra Smith – production manager (4, 9)
- Jeff Adamoff – art direction
- September – art direction
- Randee St. Nicholas – photography
- Gallin Morey Associates – management

== Personnel ==
- Pebbles – lead vocals, backing vocals, vocal arrangements
- Babyface – keyboards (1–8), keyboard programming (1–8), rhythm arrangements (1–8), vocal arrangements (1–9), backing vocals (2–4, 8), lead vocals (3), Moog bass (4), Fender 5-string bass (5, 7), guitars (8), guitar solo (9)
- Donald Parks – Fairlight CMI (1–4, 8, 10), Synclavier programming (1, 3, 8, 10), Synclavier (5–7, 9)
- Danny Sembello – keyboards (8)
- Daryl Simmons – backing vocals (4, 9, 10), keyboards (9, 10), keyboard programming (9, 10), guitars (9), rhythm arrangements (9, 10), vocal arrangements (9, 10)
- Kayo – Moog bass (1, 2, 6, 8–10), Fender 5-string bass (3), percussion (5, 7), backing vocals (9, 10), vocal arrangements (9, 10), keyboards (10), keyboard programming (10), drums (10)
- L.A. Reid – drums, percussion, backing vocals (1, 9), rhythm arrangements (1–8), vocal arrangements (1–4, 6, 8)
- After 7 – backing vocals (1, 2, 6, 10)
- Natisse "Bambi" Jones – backing vocals (1, 6, 8)
- Salt 'N' Pepa – raps (2)
- Johnny Gill – backing vocals (4, 8)
- Karyn White – backing vocals (4)
- Cherrelle – backing vocals (8)

== Charts ==
=== Weekly charts ===
Chart (1990)	Peak position
Canada Top Albums/CDs (RPM)	68
US Billboard 200	37
US Top R&B/Hip-Hop Albums (Billboard)	12

=== Year-end charts ===
Chart (1991)	Position
US Top R&B/Hip-Hop Albums (Billboard)	25

== Certifications ==
Region	Certification	Certified units/sales
United States (RIAA)	Gold	500,000^{^}
^{^} Shipments figures based on certification alone.
