= Girlfriend (Pebbles song) =

1987 single by Perri "Pebbles" Reid

Single by Pebbles

from the album Pebbles
- B-side: "Girlfriend" (instrumental)
- Released: 1987
- Length: 6:43 (album version); 4:16 (single version)
- Label: MCA
- Songwriters: Kenneth Edmonds; Antonio Reid
- Producers: L.A. Reid; Babyface

Pebbles singles chronology
"Love/Hate" (1987)	"Girlfriend" (1987)	"Mercedes Boy" (1988)

"Girlfriend" is a song by American singer Pebbles from her 1987 self-titled debut studio album. Written and produced by L.A. Reid and Babyface, "Girlfriend" was released as the album's lead single on in 1987 by MCA Records. The song charted in several countries, peaking at number five on the US Billboard Hot 100 and reaching the top 10 in Ireland and the United Kingdom.

== Background ==
The song was originally intended for Vanessa Williams' debut album The Right Stuff. According to L.A. Reid, Williams' record label Wing showed interest in Williams' recording "Girlfriend", which Reid played for her alone in his apartment. However, Pebbles heard the song and offered Reid more money and two cars for the chance to record it. As a result, the production team were not asked to work on more songs on Williams' debut. Reid said due to that incident, Williams never spoke to him again.

== Chart performance ==
"Girlfriend" became Pebbles' first top-five hit on the US Billboard Hot 100 chart and her first number one song on the Hot R&B/Hip-Hop Songs chart. The single also peaked at number eight in the United Kingdom and at number nine in Ireland, becoming Pebbles' only top-10 hit in both countries, reached the top 20 in Switzerland, Canada, and West Germany, and was a Top 40 hit in New Zealand, the Netherlands, and Belgium.

== Awards and accolades ==
"Girlfriend" earned Pebbles her first nomination for the Best Female R&B Vocal Performance at the 1989 Grammy Awards, losing to "Giving You the Best That I Got" by Anita Baker.

== Track listings ==
7-inch and Japanese mini-CD single

1. "Girlfriend" – 4:19
2. "Girlfriend" (instrumental) – 4:19

US, European, and Australian 12-inch single

A1. "Girlfriend" (extended version) – 6:49
B1. "Girlfriend" (instrumental) – 6:49
B2. "Girlfriend" (dub version) – 4:54

UK 12-inch single

A1. "Girlfriend" (extended version) – 6:49
B1. "Girlfriend" (extended instrumental) – 6:49
B2. "Girlfriend" (vocal edit) – 5:45

UK 12-inch remix single

A1. "Girlfriend" (dance remix) – 8:30
B1. "Girlfriend" (extended instrumental) – 6:49
B2. "Girlfriend" (7-inch edit) – 3:45

UK CD single

1. "Girlfriend" (7-inch version) – 3:43
2. "Love/Hate" (radio edit) – 5:24
3. "Girlfriend" (dance remix) – 8:27

== Charts ==
=== Weekly charts ===
Chart (1987–1988)	Peak position
Australia (Australian Music Report)	86
Belgium (Ultratop 50 Flanders)	33
Canada Retail Singles (The Record)	20
Canada Top Singles (RPM)	17
Europe (Eurochart Hot 100)	28
Ireland (IRMA)	9
Netherlands (Dutch Top 40)	21
Netherlands (Single Top 100)	23
New Zealand (Recorded Music NZ)	22
Switzerland (Schweizer Hitparade)	13
UK Singles (Official Charts)	8
US Billboard Hot 100	5
US 12-inch Singles Sales (Billboard)	1
US Dance Club Play (Billboard)	24
US Hot Black Singles (Billboard)	1
West Germany (GfK)	14

=== Year-end charts ===
Chart (1988)	Position
US Billboard Hot 100	60
US 12-inch Singles Sales (Billboard)	17
US Hot Black Singles (Billboard)	2

== Release history ==
Region	Date	Format(s)	Label(s)	Ref.
United States	1987	7-inch vinyl; 12-inch vinyl	MCA	
United Kingdom	March 7, 1988	7-inch vinyl; 12-inch vinyl	MCA	
United Kingdom	March 14, 1988	12-inch remix vinyl	MCA	
United Kingdom	April 4, 1988	CD	MCA	

== Caramel version ==
"Girlfriend"

Single by Caramel
- Released: 1999
- Genre: UK garage
- Length: 4:06
- Label: Brothers
- Songwriters: Kenneth Edmonds, Antonio Reid
- Producers: Andy Lee, Pete Lee

UK garage duo Caramel released their version as a single in 1999, featuring Paule van Wijngaarden on vocals. It reached No. 9 on the UK Dance Singles Chart.

=== Track listing ===
UK CD single

1. "Girlfriend" (radio mix) – 4:06
2. "Voodoo Man" (radio mix) – 3:35
3. "Girlfriend" (master mix) – 6:57

=== Charts ===
Chart (1999)	Peak position
UK Dance (Official Charts)	9

== See also ==
- List of number-one R&B singles of 1988 (U.S.)
