= Damian Dame (album) =

Studio album by Damian Dame
- Released: May 14, 1991
- Recorded: 1990
- Studio: Studio LaCoCo; Doppler Studios; Soundscape Studios (Atlanta, Georgia); Encore Studios (Los Angeles, California)
- Genre: R&B; hip hop; new jack swing
- Length: 51:36
- Label: LaFace
- Producer: Kenneth Edmonds; Antonio Reid; Kevin Roberson; Louil Silas, Jr.; Daryl Simmons

Singles from Damian Dame
- 1. "Exclusivity" Released: April 15, 1991; 2. "Right Down to It" Released: August 21, 1991; 3. "Gotta Learn the Rhythm" Released: February 14, 1992

Professional ratings
Review scores
Source	Rating
AllMusic	2/5 stars

Damian Dame is the only studio album by American R&B group Damian Dame, released May 14, 1991 via LaFace Records. The album did not chart on the Billboard 200, but it peaked at #21 on the Billboard R&B chart. Both members of Damian Dame died before a second album could be recorded.

Three singles were released from Damian Dame: "Exclusivity", "Right Down to It" and "Gotta Learn the Rhythm". "Exclusivity" was the most successful single from the album, peaking at #42 on the Billboard Hot 100 in 1991 and hitting #1 for 2 weeks on the Billboard R&B Charts in July 1991.

== Track listing ==
All music is composed by Kenneth Edmonds, Antonio Reid, Kevin Roberson and Daryl Simmons; except where noted

No.	Title	Writer(s)	Producer(s)	Length
1.	"Intro"			0:14
2.	"Exclusivity"	Bruce Broadus; Kenneth Edmonds; Antonio Reid		5:34
3.	"Gotta Learn My Rhythm"	Kenneth Edmonds; Antonio Reid; Daryl Simmons		5:04
4.	"Believer"	Bruce Broadus; Debra Jean Hurd	Kevin Roberson; Daryl Simmons	4:37
5.	"Right Down to It"	Kenneth Edmonds; Antonio Reid; Daryl Simmons		4:54
6.	"Virgin Island"	Bruce Broadus; Debra Jean Hurd	Kevin Roberson; Daryl Simmons	4:44
7.	"Whack It on Me"	Bruce Broadus; Debra Jean Hurd; Kenneth Edmonds; Antonio Reid; Daryl Simmons; Charles Bobbit; Scott Gibson		5:23
8.	"Don't Remind Me"	Kenneth Edmonds; Antonio Reid; Daryl Simmons		5:03
9.	"Love Come Near Me"	Bruce Broadus; Debra Jean Hurd	Kevin Roberson; Daryl Simmons	4:54
10.	"Trumpet Man"	Bruce Broadus; Debra Jean Hurd; Antonio Reid; Daryl Simmons		4:52
11.	"When I'm Crying"	Kenneth Edmonds; Kevin Roberson; Daryl Simmons	Kevin Roberson; Daryl Simmons	5:07
12.	"Sixty Seconds (The Conclusion)" (featuring T-Boz and Left Eye)	Bruce Broadus; Debra Jean Hurd; Antonio Reid; Daryl Simmons; Lisa Lopes; Tionne Watkins	Kenneth Edmonds; Antonio Reid; Kevin Roberson; Louil Silas, Jr.; Daryl Simmons	1:20
13.	"Exclusivity" (remix)			5:00
Total length:				51:36

== Charts ==
=== Weekly charts ===
Chart (1991)	Peak position
US Top R&B/Hip-Hop Albums (Billboard)	21

=== Year-end charts ===
Chart (1991)	Position
US Top R&B/Hip-Hop Albums (Billboard)	72
