= Giving You the Benefit =

1990 single by Pebbles

Single by Pebbles

from the album Always
- Released: August 11, 1990
- Studio: Elumba Recording (Hollywood, California)
- Length: 5:41 (LP version); 4:28 (7-inch version)
- Label: MCA
- Songwriters: Kenneth Edmonds; Antonio Reid
- Producers: L.A. Reid; Babyface

Pebbles singles chronology
"Do Me Right" (1988)	"Giving You the Benefit" (1990)	"Love Makes Things Happen" (1990)

"Giving You the Benefit" is a song by American recording artist Pebbles from her second album, Always (1990). Written and produced by Kenneth "Babyface" Edmonds and Antonio "L.A." Reid, the song was released as the lead single from Always on August 11, 1990, by MCA Records. It was her last top-five pop hit on the US Billboard Hot 100 chart, peaking at number four later that year.

== Personnel ==
- Perri "Pebbles" Reid – lead vocals, backing vocals, co-producer
- Kenneth "Babyface" Edmonds – writer, producer, keyboards, keyboard programming, backing vocals
- Antonio "L.A." Reid – writer, producer, drums, percussion, backing vocals
- Kevin "Kayo" Roberson – bass
- Donald K. Parks – synthesizer (Fairlight CMI)
- Natisse "Bambi" Jones – backing vocals
- After 7 – backing vocals

== Charts ==
=== Weekly charts ===
Chart (1990–1991)	Peak position
Australia (ARIA)	48
Canada Retail Singles (The Record)	19
Canada Contemporary Hit Radio (The Record)	13
Canada Top Singles (RPM)	32
Canada Dance/Urban (RPM)	4
Netherlands (Single Top 100)	32
New Zealand (Recorded Music NZ)	26
UK Singles (Official Charts)	73
US Billboard Hot 100	4
US 12-inch Singles Sales (Billboard)	5
US Dance Club Play (Billboard)	10
US Hot Black Singles (Billboard)	1
US Cash Box Top 100	3

=== Year-end charts ===
Chart (1990)	Position
Canada Dance/Urban (RPM)	20
US Billboard Hot 100	65
US Hot R&B Singles (Billboard)	21
US Cash Box Top 100	46

== Release history ==
Region	Date	Format(s)	Label(s)	Ref.
United States	August 11, 1990	7-inch vinyl; 12-inch vinyl; CD; cassette	MCA	
United Kingdom	October 1, 1990	7-inch vinyl; 12-inch vinyl; CD	MCA	
United Kingdom	October 22, 1990	Limited-edition 12-inch vinyl	MCA	
Japan	October 25, 1990	Mini-CD	MCA	
Australia	November 5, 1990	7-inch vinyl; 12-inch vinyl; CD; cassette	MCA	

== See also ==
- List of number-one R&B singles of 1990 (U.S.)
