= Chrome Children =

Compilation album and DVD by Various artists
- Released: October 3, 2006
- Genre: Hip hop
- Length: 55:57 (CD); 50:33 (DVD)
- Labels: Stones Throw; Adult Swim
- Producers: Oh No; J Dilla; Koushik; James Pants; Madlib; Georgia Anne Muldrow; JRose; J. Rocc; Gary Wilson; Pure Essence; Aloe Blacc; Sweet Steve

Various artists chronology
Stones Throw Records 2005 Sampler (2005)	Chrome Children (2006)	Chrome Children Vol. 2 (2007)

Professional ratings
Review scores
Source	Rating
AllMusic	4/5 stars
HipHopDX	3.5/5 stars
Okayplayer	4/5 stars
Pitchfork Media	6.1/10
Stylus Magazine	B

Chrome Children is a co-production between Stones Throw Records and Adult Swim. The CD & DVD set, released on October 3, 2006, includes songs from Oh No, J Dilla, Madlib, and other Stones Throw artists. It also includes footage from a hip-hop concert headlined by MF Doom and Madlib on DVD. The concert was filmed by Adult Swim at the 2006 SXSW festival in Austin, Texas.

A sequel, Chrome Children Vol. 2, was released in digital format January 29, 2007. The CD version was later released.

== Track listing ==
1. "Oh Zone"
  - Performed by Oh No
  - Produced by Oh No
2. "Clap Your Hands"
  - Performed by Guilty Simpson
  - Produced by J Dilla
3. "Take It Back"
  - Performed by Madlib
  - Produced by J Dilla
4. "None In Mind"
  - Performed by Koushik
  - Produced by Koushik
5. "Nothing Like This"
  - Performed by J Dilla
  - Produced by J Dilla
6. "Do a Couple of Things"
  - Performed by James Pants
  - Produced by James Pants
7. "Monkey Suite"
  - Performed by MF Doom
  - Produced by Madlib
8. "Simply a Joy"
  - Performed by Georgia Anne Muldrow
  - Produced by Georgia Anne Muldrow
9. "All I Know"
  - Performed by M.E.D.
  - Produced by Madlib
10. "Wassup World?"
  - Performed by Dudley Perkins
  - Produced by JRose
11. "Raw Heat"
  - Performed by Percee P, Quasimoto
  - Produced by Madlib
12. "No $ No Toke (aka Blaze Up)"
  - Performed by Jaylib
  - Produced by Madlib
13. "Drama"
  - Performed by J. Rocc
  - Produced by J. Rocc
14. "Movin'"
  - Performed by Roc C
  - Produced by Oh No
15. "Dreams"
  - Performed by Gary Wilson
  - Produced by Gary Wilson
16. "Third Rock"
  - Performed by Pure Essence
  - Produced by Pure Essence
17. "What Now"
  - Performed by Aloe Blacc
  - Produced by Aloe Blacc
18. "Turned Around [PBW Remix]"
  - Performed by Baron Zen
  - Produced by Sweet Steve (Remixed By Peanut Butter Wolf)
19. "Nino's Deed"
  - Performed by Young Jazz Rebels
  - Produced by Madlib
