= Soul Cal: Funky Disco & Modern Soul, 1971–82 =

Soul Cal: Funky Disco & Modern Soul, 1971-82

Compilation album by Various artists
- Released: May 1, 2012
- Recorded: 1971–1982
- Genres: Disco, soul, funk, psychedelic soul
- Length: 63:53
- Language: English
- Labels: Now-Again Records, Stones Throw

Soul Cal: Funky Disco & Modern Soul, 1971–82 is a compilation album featuring various disco, Soul, and funk artists. Released on May 1, 2012, on Now-Again Records, a subsidiary of Stones Throw Records, the collection contains 15 songs and an 80-page book which summarizes the artists' backstories and recording processes.

== Reception ==
Joe Muggs of The Wire remarked that the album encapsulates "the retro-utopian vision of a past where every smalltown record store or garage in the US might have hidden a virtuosic funk outfit; the thrill of knowing that jobbing musicians might be getting paid for the first time; plus the bittersweet knowledge that those that passed on are getting deserved recognition. And all that before you get the thrill of the music itself." Cyril Cordor of Okayplayer wrote that "Soul Cal may not have the same intellectual intrigue of Now Again compilations on Zambian psych-rock or Afro-spiritual jazz, but (Stones Throw general manager Egon) Alapatt wholeheartedly accomplishes this task with his meticulous handling and care of these bands’ precious music and stories."

Allmusic's Fred Thomas said: "To be sure, this collection and book are pure record-nerd fare, even more fine-tuned for those already versed in funk 45 obsession and looking to get even deeper into hyper obscure subgenres and micro-histories." Jim Farber of the New York Daily News suggested that the set "of obscure, American indie-R&B acts [...] bridged the gap between disco and soul with tracks that sound like outtakes from the Saturday Night Fever soundtrack." The Quietus named the album to its list of 2012's best reissues, compilations, mixes & live albums.

== Track listing ==
No.	Title	Artist	Length
1.	"You Can Be a Star"	Luther Davis	4:36
2.	"Don't Get Discouraged"	U.P.C. All Stars	3:32
3.	"Wake Up"	Pure Essence	6:08
4.	"Ecology"	Anibus	4:00
5.	"Put a Smile on Time"	Rhythm Machine	3:53
6.	"I'm Gonna Miss You Girl"	Ellis & Cephas	2:51
7.	"It's a Bad Feeling"	Mixed Sugar	3:03
8.	"Sha-La-La"	Mixed Feelings	3:28
9.	"What It Takes to Live"	Key & Cleary	3:12
10.	"Love Is"	Leon Mitchison & the Eastex Freeway Band	4:17
11.	"Keep Running Away"	Clifford Nyren	2:56
12.	"Things Cannot Stop Forever"	Stanton Davis' Ghetto/Mysticism	6:06
13.	"The Stranger"	C. Henry Woods Troupe	8:33
14.	"Free Your Mind"	Record Player	3:50
15.	"Get Down"	Colors of Love Choir / Freedom Express	3:28
