= Billboard Year-End Hot Rap Singles of 1991 =

American music chart

This is a list of Billboard magazine's Top Rap songs of 1991.

No.	Title	Artist(s)
1	"Treat 'Em Right"	Chubb Rock
2	"Around the Way Girl"	LL Cool J
3	"I'll Do 4 U"	Father MC
4	"Looking at the Front Door"	Main Source
5	"O.P.P"	Naughty by Nature
6	"Mind Playing Tricks on Me"	Geto Boys
7	"Gold Digger"	EPMD
8	"You Can't Play With My Yo-Yo"	Yo-Yo
9	"Stompin' to tha 90's"	Yo-Yo
10	"Daddy's Little Girl"	Nikki D
11	"The Chubbster"	Chubb Rock
12	"Fuck Compton"	Tim Dog
13	"I Got to Have It"	Ed O.G. & Da Bulldogs
14	"Mama Said Knock You Out"	LL Cool J
15	"Born and Raised in Compton"	DJ Quik
16	"Summertime"	DJ Jazzy Jeff & the Fresh Prince
17	"The Ghetto"	Too Short
18	"Homey Don't Play Dat"	Terminator X
19	"Your Mom's in My Business"	K-Solo
20	"Growin' Up in the Hood"	Compton's Most Wanted
21	"Rise N Shine"	Kool Moe Dee featuring KRS-One and Chuck D
22	"The House the Dog Built"	Jibri Wise One
23	"Pop Goes the Weasel"	3rd Bass
24	"Monie in the Middle"	Monie Love
25	"New Jack Hustler (Nino's Theme)"	Ice-T
26	"Cause I Can Do It Right"	Big Daddy Kane
27	"Rampage"	EPMD featuring LL Cool J
28	"Bitch Betta Have My Money"	AMG
29	"Mind Blowin'"	The D.O.C.
30	"Melt in Your Mouth"	Candyman

== See also ==
- 1991 in music
- Billboard Year-End Hot 100 singles of 1991
- Billboard Year-End Hot R&B Singles of 1991
- List of Billboard number-one rap singles of 1991
