= Pebbles (Pebbles album) =

Studio album by Pebbles
- Released: November 16, 1987
- Recorded: 1986–1987
- Studio: Various: Studio Masters, Image Recording Studios and Mad Hatter Studios (Los Angeles, CA); Larrabee Sound Studios (North Hollywood, CA); Galaxy Sound Studios and Music Grinder Studios (Hollywood, CA); Bossa Nova Hotel (San Fernando, CA); Ground Control Studios (Santa Monica, CA); Zebra Studio (Studio City, CA); Yamaha R & D Studio (Glendale, CA); Mankind Studios (Encino, CA); Studio D (Sausalito, CA); Fantasy Studios (Berkeley, CA)
- Genre: R&B
- Length: 50:22
- Label: MCA
- Producers: L.A. Reid & Babyface; Charlie Wilson; Alex Brown; André Cymone; Paul Jackson Jr.; Pebbles; Danny Sembello

Pebbles chronology
Pebbles (1987)	Always (1990)

Singles from Pebbles
- 1. "Girlfriend" Released: October 26, 1987; 2. "Mercedes Boy" Released: March 7, 1988; 3. "Take Your Time" Released: June 27, 1988; 4. "Do Me Right" Released: September 19, 1988

Professional ratings
Review scores
Source	Rating
AllMusic	3/5 stars

Pebbles is the debut album by American singer Pebbles, released in 1987 on MCA Records. The album spawned two US Hot 100 hits; "Girlfriend" (US No. 5) and "Mercedes Boy" (US No. 2), as well as the top 5 R&B hit "Take Your Time".

== Track listing ==
Side one
No.	Title	Writer(s)	Length
1.	"Girlfriend"	L.A. Reid, Babyface	6:43
2.	"Two Hearts"	Paul Jackson, Jr., Judy Wieder	4:24
3.	"First Step (In the Right Direction)"	Danny Sembello, Michael Sembello	4:38
4.	"Take Your Time"	Danny Sembello, Donnell Spencer	5:23
5.	"Slip Away"	Pebbles, Danny Sembello	5:11

Side two
No.	Title	Writer(s)	Length
6.	"Mercedes Boy"	Pebbles	4:55
7.	"Do Me Right"	Michael Cooper, Gerald Lamar	4:49
8.	"Love/Hate" ("From Beverly Hills Cop II")	André Cymone, Julian Jackson	5:28
9.	"Baby Love"	Pebbles, Jay Logan	4:16
10.	"Give Me Your Love"	Pebbles, Jay Logan	4:53

== Personnel ==
- Pebbles – vocals
- Babyface, André Cymone, Kevin Grady, Roman Johnson, Danny Sembello, Billy Young – keyboards, programming
- Babyface, Bruce Gaitsch, Paul Jackson Jr., Fred Jenkins, Michael Sembello – guitars
- Kayo, Cornelius Mims – bass
- L.A. Reid – drums
- Paulinho da Costa – percussion
- Gary Herbig – saxophones, flute
- Babyface, Alex Brown, Cherrelle, Lynn Davis, Carol Dennis, Siedah Garrett, Marlena Jeter, Yvette Marine, Katrina Perkins, L.A. Reid, Danny Sembello, Jackie Smiley, Jullia Waters, Jessica Williams, Charlie Wilson – backing vocals

Production

- George L. Smith – executive producer, management
- Pebbles – co-producer, cover concept
- L.A Reid – producer (1)
- Babyface – producer (1)
- Alex Brown – producer (2, 3, 5)
- Paul Jackson Jr. – producer (2)
- Danny Sembello – producer (3, 4, 5), recording, second engineer
- Charlie Wilson – producer (4, 6, 7, 9, 10)
- André Cymone – producer (8)
- Hilary Bercovici – recording
- Bobby Brooks – recording
- Gerry Brown – recording
- Craig Burbidge – recording
- Jon Gass – recording
- Peter Kelsey – recording
- Taavi Mote – recording, mix engineer, remixing (1, 8)
- Dave Rideau – recording
- Bud Rizzo – recording, second engineer
- Randy Waldman – recording
- John Hedges – second engineer
- Jeff Lorenzen – second engineer
- John Payne – second engineer
- Lenette Viegas – second engineer
- Rob Von Arx – second engineer
- Louil Silas, Jr. – mixing, remixing (1, 8)
- Greg Royal – editing (8)
- Steve Hall – mastering at Future Disc (Hollywood, California)
- Zetra Smith – production coordinator
- Matisse Euell – production assistant (1–7, 9, 10)
- Jamie Newton – production assistant (8)
- Jeff Adamoff – art direction
- Michael Diehl – design
- Randee St. Nicholas – photography, cover concept
- Carmé Tenuta – make-up
- Lynn Bugai – stylist

== Charts ==
=== Weekly charts ===
Chart (1987–1988)	Peak position
Canada Top Albums/CDs (RPM)	43
Dutch Albums (Album Top 100)	56
UK Albums (Official Charts)	56
US Billboard 200	14
US Top R&B/Hip-Hop Albums (Billboard)	5

=== Year-end charts ===
Chart (1988)	Position
US Billboard 200	36
US Top R&B/Hip-Hop Albums (Billboard)	13

== Certifications ==
Region	Certification	Certified units/sales
United States (RIAA)	Platinum	1,000,000^{^}
^{^} Shipments figures based on certification alone.
