= The Saga Continues... (The Boys album) =

Studio album by the Boys
- Released: April 5, 1992
- Recorded: 1991–1992
- Genre: R&B
- Length: 1:00:24
- Label: Motown
- Producer: The Boys, Hakeem Abdulsamad, Roy "Dog" Pennon

The Boys chronology
The Boys (1990)	The Saga Continues... (1992)

Singles from The Saga Continues
- 1. "The Saga Continues" Released: April 25, 1992; 2. "Doin’ With The B"; 3. "Tonite"

The Saga Continues... is the third and final studio album by R&B group Suns of Light (as the Boys), released on April 5, 1992, via Motown Records.

The album reached No. 191 on the Billboard 200 and No. 45 on the Billboard R&B Albums chart. The title track peaked at number 15 on the Billboard Hot R&B Singles chart.

== Track listing ==
No.	Title	Writer(s)	Length
1.	"The Saga Continues..."	Hakeem Abdulsamad; Khiry Abdulsamad; Tajh Abdulsamad; Bilal Abdulsamad	5:36
2.	"Doin' It with the B"	H. Abdulsamad; Rahsad Mahmoud; Chadron Moore; B. Abdulsamad	5:08
3.	"You Got Me Cryin'"	H. Abdulsamad; Rodney Jackson; Harold Tidwell	5:17
4.	"Tonite"	H. Abdulsamad	4:29
5.	"Funny '92"	H. Abdulsamad; K. Abdulsamad	4:19
6.	"Happiness"	H. Abdulsamad; Joe Wolfe; T. Abdulsamad; Gerald Cox; Roy Pennon	4:52
7.	"Thought You Knew"	H. Abdulsamad	4:25
8.	"Hak's House of Pleasure"	H. Abdulsamad	5:57
9.	"I'm Yours"	H. Abdulsamad; T. Abdulsamad; K. Abdulsamad; Pennon	5:16
10.	"Be Yo Man"	H. Abdulsamad; K. Abdulsamad; Don McCray	4:46
11.	"Apple Juice"	H. Abdulsamad; B. Abdulsamad; Jackson	4:49
12.	"Freak of the Week"	H. Abdulsamad; K. Abdulsamad	4:55

== Personnel ==
- Lead vocals – The Boys
- Bass – Roy "Dog" Pennon (tracks: 6, 11, 12),
- Guitar – Stan Jones (tracks: 1, 2, 3, 4, 6, 7, 10, 11, 12)
- Keyboards – Hakeem Abdulsamad, Roy "Dog" Pennon (tracks: 9)
- Drum programming – Hakeem Abdulsamad*, Roy "Dog" Pennon* (tracks: 9)
- Scratches – Tray-Ski
- Producer – Hakeem Abdulsamad
- Co-producers – Bilal Abdulsamad, Khiry Abdulsamad, Roy "Dog" Pennon* (tracks: 9), Tajh Abdulsamad
- Engineer – John Karpowich
- Executive producers – Jabari Abdulsamad, Vida Sparks
- Mastered by Herb Powers
- Mixed by Dave Way (tracks: 2, 3, 4, 7, 9, 10), Hakeem Abdulsamad*, John Karpowich (tracks: 1, 5, 6, 11, 12)
