= Can You Stop the Rain =

Single by Peabo Bryson

from the album Can You Stop the Rain
- Released: May 4, 1991
- Length: 5:34
- Label: Columbia
- Songwriters: John Bettis; Walter Afanasieff
- Producer: Walter Afanasieff

Peabo Bryson singles chronology
"Lover's Paradise" (1990)	"Can You Stop the Rain" (1991)	"Closer Than Close" (1991)

"Can You Stop the Rain" is a song by American singer Peabo Bryson, taken from his fifteenth studio album of the same name (1991). It was written by John Bettis and Walter Afanasieff, while production was helmed by the latter. Released as the album's lead single, the song spent two weeks at number one on the US Hot R&B/Hip-Hop Songs chart and peaked at number fifty-two on the Billboard Hot 100. It also reached number 11 on the Adult Contemporary chart.

== Music video ==
Directed by Rocky Schenck, the video is shot in a sepia tone with Bryson singing the song in places like a plaza, a ballroom containing a band performing and inside a room where he sings to a window that's pouring rain.

== Personnel and credits ==
- Peabo Bryson – lead vocals
- Walter Afanasieff – songwriter, producer, arrangements, keyboards, synth bass, drums, percussion
- John Bettis – songwriter
- Gary Cirimelli – Synclavier programming
- Ren Klyce – Synclavier programming, synthesizer programming (Akai)
- Claytoven Richardson, Jeanie Tracy, Kitty Beethoven, Melisa Kary and Sandy Griffith – backing vocals

== Charts ==
=== Weekly charts ===
Chart (1991)	Peak position
US Billboard Hot 100	52
US Adult Contemporary (Billboard)	11
US Hot R&B/Hip-Hop Songs (Billboard)	1

=== Year-end charts ===
Chart (1991)	Position
US Hot R&B/Hip-Hop Songs (Billboard)	5

== See also ==
- List of number-one R&B singles of 1991 (U.S.)
