= Pure Essence =

American R&B band with limited regional fame

- Origin: Cincinnati, Ohio, United States
- Genres: Funk, R&B, soul, rock
- Years active: 1973–1982
- Labels: Mantra, Soul Cal
- Past members: Steve "Tuck" Walters; Jerome "Mouse" Richmond; Antonio "L.A." Reid; Kevin "Kayo" Roberson; Toby Rivers; Tony Coats; Dwight Trible; Larry Middleton

Pure Essence were an American R&B band from Cincinnati, Ohio, originally consisting of Steve "Tuck" Walters, Jerome "Mouse" Richmond, Toby Rivers, Tony Coats, Dwight Trible, Larry Middleton, Antonio "L.A." Reid, and Kevin "Kayo" Roberson. The band released only one record, in 1976, and achieved limited regional fame during their tenure. But they received wider attention and acclaim nearly three decades later after one of their songs, "Third Rock", was sampled by producer/musician RJD2 on the track "Clean Living" (2004). The group's songs later appeared on the Chrome Children compilation album (2005), the Saints Row 2 video game soundtrack (2008), and the Soul Cal: Funky Disco & Modern Soul, 1971–82 compilation album (2012). A 2006 issue of The Fader called Pure Essence a "crucial soul-rock outfit" of the 1970s.

== Biography ==
When Steve "Tuck" Walters and Jerome "Mouse" Richmond joined Cincinnati band Mother's Pride in the early-mid 1970s, they helped lead the group into a different musical direction, as well as a name change, to Pure Essence. Pure Essence was influenced by such acts as Sly And The Family Stone, Curtis Mayfield, Yes, and contemporary local artists including Jimi Macon and Bootsy Collins.

Former baseball player Dave Parker, then of the Pittsburgh Pirates, partially banked the group which helped them to record some songs in the studio. Antonio "L.A." Reid, the band's drummer, recalled: "We took one song ('Wake Up') to WCIN and they played it, and another ('Third Rock') went to a WEBN album project. I was 18 and I had songs on both stations." Reid noted that "Third Rock" was added to WEBN's playlist where "it became a local hit."

By 1980, following several personnel changes, some of the remaining band members had relocated to Indianapolis. The group, now known simply as "Essence", worked the local club circuit, playing four shows a night, six nights a week. Reid told Vibe in a 2003 interview that in addition to drumming, his duties within Essence at this time included being a roadie, managing the band, songwriting, and peacekeeping. It was not long before the band again dissolved, but Reid and Roberson re-emerged in 1983 to form The Deele, whose lineup included Indianapolis native Kenneth "Babyface" Edmonds on guitar. Reid and Edmonds went on to become music industry executives, co-founding LaFace Records in 1989.

== Renewed interest ==
"Third Rock" was sampled on producer/musician RJD2's "Clean Living", the opening track from his 2004 album Since We Last Spoke. In comparing the original 1970s version with the sample, Stylus Magazine writer Tal Rosenberg said that Pure Essence "performs the track better than what was already a highlight on Since We Last Spoke." In 2005, the Soul Cal record label, a division of Stones Throw Records, came across Pure Essence's record and found that it had become popular among DJs who specialized in funk music and classic R&B which was beginning a resurgence in night clubs in Europe, the United States, and parts of Asia. "Third Rock" was later included on the Chrome Children compilation, a co-production of Stones Throw Records and Adult Swim released in 2006. Marisa Brown of Allmusic said that the song "is nothing but smooth, warm funk." Pitchfork Media's Ryan Dombal called the song a "Sly Stone-style 1970s gem".

In a review of the 2005 re-release of "Wake Up", music journalist Dave Tompkins of The Wire likened the song's guitar sounds to those performed by Nile Rodgers on the 1979 Sister Sledge song, "Thinking of You", which Rodgers co-wrote. Tompkins compared favorably the bass at the beginning of "Wake Up" to that heard in the 1981 single "You Can't Turn Me Away" by Sylvia Striplin. Tompkins characterized Jerome Richmond's vocals as being "quiet as a skull balloon and making buildings woozy before purging the Joe Cocker werewolf from his larynx, a release to hold, tightly by the yowl, when flying through a tragic summer that's still not done with us. Usher (Raymond) will crap his designer cover story jeans when he finally hears it." The song featured in the 2008 video game Saints Row 2, and it later appeared on the 2012 compilation album, Soul Cal: Disco & Modern Soul, 1971-1982. "Wake Up" was described by Allmusic's Fred Thomas as "washy phase-damaged disco" that sounds "absolutely vital when plucked out of obscurity."

== Original members ==
- Steve "Tuck" Walters: guitar, vocals
- Jerome "Mouse" Richmond: vocals, percussion
- Kevin "Kayo" Roberson: bass
- Antonio "L.A." Reid: drums
- Toby Rivers: keyboards
- Tony Coats: unknown
- Dwight Trible: unknown
- Larry Middleton: vocals, guitar

== Discography ==
=== Studio albums ===
- Wake Up, parts 1 and 2 / Third Rock (single) - Mantra, 1976
- Wake Up, parts 1 and 2 / Third Rock (re-release) - Soul Cal Records, 2005

=== Compilation appearances ===
- WEBN - The Album Project #2 (rock compilation album) (1977)
- Chrome Children (hip-hop compilation album) (2006)
- Soul Cal: Funky Disco & Modern Soul, 1971–82 (soul compilation album) (2012)
