= Suns of Light =

American R&B band

- Origin: Carson, California, U.S.
- Genres: R&B, new jack swing
- Years active: 1984–1995 (as the Boys); 1999–present (as Suns of Light)
- Labels: Motown, HAK Productions
- Members: Khiry Abdulsamad; Hakeem Abdulsamad; Tajh Abdulsamad; Bilal Abdulsamad

Suns of Light are an American R&B boy band, originally known as the Boys.

== Biography ==
Their grandmother taught them singing, dancing, and acting. In the summer of 1984, ages 5 to 10 as "The Boys," the group began busking at the Venice Beach boardwalk. Their first single, "Dial My Heart" became a hit, charting at #1.

== Members ==
- Khiry "Khiry the King" Abdulsamad (born November 10, 1973)
- Hakeem "Hak/Hakim" Abdulsamad (born March 26, 1975) - starred in Ernest Goes to Camp", "Wildcats", Moonwalker and voiced Franklin in This Is America, Charlie Brown.
- Tajh "TJ" Abdulsamad (born December 8, 1976)
- Bilal "Baby B" Abdulsamad (born April 17, 1979)

== Discography ==
=== Albums ===
Year	Album	US
1988	Messages from the Boys	32
1990	The Boys	108
1992	The Saga Continues...	191

=== Singles ===
Year	Single	Peak chart positions				Albums
Year	Single	US Hot 100	US Hot R&B	AUS	UK	Albums
1988	"Dial My Heart"	13	1	—	61	Messages from the Boys
1989	"Lucky Charm"	—	1	—	94	Messages from the Boys
1989	"Happy"	—	57	—	—	Messages from the Boys
1989	"A Little Romance"	—	13	—	—	Messages from the Boys
1990	"Crazy"	29	1	65	57	The Boys
1990	"Heritage" with Earth, Wind & Fire	—	5	—	—	Heritage
1991	"Thing Called Love"	—	14	—	—	The Boys
1991	"Thanx 4 the Funk"	—	8	—	—	The Boys
1992	"The Saga Continues"	—	15	—	—	The Saga Continues...
1992	"Tonite"	—	—	—	—	The Saga Continues...
1992	"Doin' It with the B"	—	—	—	—	The Saga Continues...
