= Mercedes Boy =

1988 single by Pebbles

Single by Pebbles

from the album Pebbles
- Released: March 7, 1988
- Genre: R&B; pop; freestyle
- Length: 4:55 (album version); 3:55 (single remix)
- Label: MCA
- Songwriter: Pebbles
- Producers: Charlie Wilson; Pebbles

Pebbles singles chronology
"Girlfriend" (1987)	"Mercedes Boy" (1988)	"Take Your Time" (1988)

"Mercedes Boy" is a song by American singer Pebbles from her 1987 self-titled debut studio album. The song was written by Pebbles and produced by Charlie Wilson, with additional production from Pebbles. "Mercedes Boy" was released as the album's second single on March 7, 1988, by MCA Records. It became Pebbles' biggest hit in the United States, peaking at number two on the Billboard Hot 100.

== Chart performance ==
In the United States, "Mercedes Boy" reached number two on the Billboard Hot 100, number one on the Hot Black Singles and 12-inch Singles Sales charts, and number two on the Dance Club Play chart. In Canada, "Mercedes Boy" peaked at number 14 on the RPM 100 Singles chart. Outside North America, the single peaked at number 42 in the United Kingdom, number 39 in the Netherlands, and number 50 in New Zealand.

== Charts ==
=== Weekly charts ===
Chart (1988)	Peak position
Canada Retail Singles (The Record)	32
Canada Top Singles (RPM)	14
Canada Dance/Urban (RPM)	9
Netherlands (Single Top 100)	39
New Zealand (Recorded Music NZ)	50
UK Singles (Official Charts)	42
US Billboard Hot 100	2
US 12-inch Singles Sales (Billboard)	1
US Dance Club Play (Billboard)	2
US Hot Black Singles (Billboard)	1

=== Year-end charts ===
Chart (1988)	Position
US Billboard Hot 100	63
US 12-inch Singles Sales (Billboard)	3
US Dance Club Play (Billboard)	17
US Hot Black Singles (Billboard)	20

== Release history ==
Region	Date	Format(s)	Label(s)	Ref.
United States	March 7, 1988	7-inch vinyl; 12-inch vinyl; cassette	MCA	
United Kingdom	May 16, 1988	7-inch vinyl; 12-inch vinyl; CD	MCA	
Japan	June 10, 1988	Mini-CD	MCA	
