= Written All Over Your Face =

Single by The Rude Boys featuring Gerald Levert

from the album Rude Awakening
- B-side: "Fool for You"
- Released: December 4, 1990
- Recorded: 1990
- Studio: Right Track, Cleveland, Ohio; Sigma Sound, Philadelphia, Pennsylvania
- Genre: contemporary R&B
- Length: 6:21 (Album version); 4:10 (Radio edit)
- Label: Atlantic
- Songwriter: Larry Marcus
- Producers: Larry Marcus, Jim Salamone

The Rude Boys featuring Gerald Levert singles chronology
"Come On Let's Do This" (1990)	"Written All Over Your Face" (1990)	"My Kinda Girl" (1992)

"Written All Over Your Face" is a song by American R&B group The Rude Boys, released as the second single from their debut album Rude Awakening. The song was written and produced by group member Larry Marcus with additional production from session musician and recording engineer Jim Salamone. The song became the group's signature song and spent one week at number one on the U.S. Billboard R&B chart. It also peaked at number sixteen on the U.S. Billboard Hot 100 in 1991. "Written All Over Your Face" made the group a sensation, as the single topped the R&B charts and reached the national top 20. The single rode the charts for 31 weeks, and made it to #1 on the Billboard R&B charts and #16 on the Billboard Hot 100.

In 1991, it won the Billboard Music Award for No. 1 R&B Single of the Year.

== Background ==
The song showcased the vocals of Joe N Little III and Edward Buddy Banks and featured extra vocals from their mentor, the late Gerald Levert.

== Charts ==
=== Weekly charts ===
Chart (1991)	Peak position
US Billboard Hot 100	16
US Billboard Hot R&B Singles	1

=== Year-end charts ===
Chart (1991)	Position
New Zealand (Recorded Music NZ)	29

== See also ==
- List of number-one R&B singles of 1991 (U.S.)
