= Love Makes Things Happen =

Single by Pebbles and Babyface

from the album Always
- Released: November 6, 1990
- Genre: R&B
- Length: 5:11
- Label: MCA 53973
- Songwriters: Kenneth Edmonds; Antonio Reid
- Producers: L.A. Reid; Babyface

Pebbles singles chronology
"Giving You the Benefit" (1990)	"Love Makes Things Happen" (1990)	"Backyard" (1991)

Babyface singles chronology
"My Kinda Girl" (1990)	"Love Makes Things Happen" (1990)	"Give U My Heart" (1992)

"Love Makes Things Happen" is a song by American recording artist Pebbles featuring guest vocals by Babyface. Taken from Pebbles' second album Always (1990), the song spent two weeks at number one on the US Billboard Hot R&B Singles chart, and peaked at number 13 on the Billboard Hot 100.

== Music video ==
The music video for “Love Makes Things Happen” is directed by Shannon Bradley-Colleary. Pebbles and Babyface sing the lyrics as a series of situations are shown. The video starts with a man kissing his wife goodbye as he heads to work. Then various situations show various people meeting by chance and falling for each other. In the end a man is shown meeting his wife showing that from the beginning they were meant to be. The video ends with shot of the man arriving home to his wife and kids.

== Chart performance ==
Chart (1991)	Peak position
Canada Top Singles (RPM)	91
US Billboard Adult Contemporary (chart)	24
US Billboard Hot 100	13
US Billboard Hot R&B Singles	1

== See also ==
- List of number-one R&B singles of 1991 (U.S.)
