= Exclusivity (song) =

Single by Damian Dame

from the album Damian Dame
- Released: April 15, 1991 (North America)
- Recorded: 1990
- Genre: R&B, new jack swing
- Length: 5:34
- Label: LaFace
- Songwriter(s): Babyface, L.A. Reid, Bruce Broadus
- Producer(s): Babyface, L.A. Reid

Damian Dame singles chronology
| "Exclusivity" (1991) | "Right Down to It" (1991) |

"Exclusivity" is a number-one R&B single by the duo Damian Dame. Taken from their eponymous album, the song spent two weeks at number-one on the US R&B chart and peaked at number forty-two on the Billboard Hot 100. The single also made it to number forty-five on dance charts.

== Personnel ==
- Damian Dame: Lead & Background Vocals, Rap
- Deah Dame: Lead & Background Vocals
- L.A. Reid: Drum Programming, Percussion, Vocal Arrangement, Rhythm Arrangement
- Babyface: Keyboards, Vocal Arrangement, Rhythm Arrangement
- Kayo: Bass, Rhythm Arrangement
- Donald Parks: Drum & MIDI Programming, Synthesizer (Fairlight CMI III)

== Charts ==
| Chart (1991) | Peak position |
|---|---|
| U.S. Billboard Hot 100 | 42 |
| U.S. Billboard Hot R&B Singles | 1 |
| U.S. Billboard Hot Dance Music/Maxi-Singles Sales | 34 |
| U.S. Billboard Dance Music/Club Play Singles | 45 |

== See also ==
- List of number-one R&B singles of 1991 (U.S.)
