= Straight from My Heart =

Studio album by Pebbles
- Released: September 12, 1995
- Recorded: 1994–1995
- Genre: Contemporary R&B; Ballad
- Length: 59:44
- Label: MCA
- Producer: Sean Combs; Organized Noize; Pebbles; Joe Rich; Tony Rich; Alex Richbourg; Chucky Thompson; Kyle West; Mario Winans

Pebbles chronology
Always (1990)	Straight from My Heart (1995)	Greatest Hits (2000)

Singles from Straight from the Heart
- 1. "Are You Ready?" Released: August 15, 1995

Straight from My Heart is the third studio album by American singer Pebbles. It was released on September 12, 1995, on MCA Records. The album features the top 40 R&B hit, "Are You Ready?".

== Critical reception ==
Professional ratings
Review scores
Source	Rating
AllMusic	4/5 stars
Entertainment Weekly	A−

AllMusic editor Stephen Thomas Erlewine rated the album four out of five stars and ranked it "among Pebbles' most consistent efforts." He found that on With Straight from the Heart "Pebbles attempts to fit into the sound of the mid-'90s and the results are surprisingly successful." He noted that the album was "more of a showcase for her producers than the singer herself. Featuring elements of jazz, funk, and hip-hop, the record is a diverse and soulful catalog of contemporary R&B; even when the songwriting is weak, the record sounds first-rate." Entertainment Weekly's David Thigpen wrote that "past the clichéd album title [...] you'll find satisfying grooves and a few killer love songs, all polished to a high gloss and carried along on Pebbles' seductive whispers and wails [...] Straight from My Heart serves as a declaration of her independence."

== Track listing ==
Straight from My Heart track listing
No.	Title	Writer(s)	Producer(s)	Length
1.	"Club Laid Back" (Intro)	Pebbles	Pebbles	2:52
2.	"Like the Last Time"	Armando Colon; Erik Milteer; Alex Richbourg	Richbourg; Pebbles; Colon^{[a]}	4:06
3.	"Are You Ready?"	Pebbles; Richbourg; Arthur Hoyle; Debra Killings; Jason Sylvain; Mario Winans	Winans	4:35
4.	"I Can't Help It"	Susaye Greene; Stevie Wonder	Richbourg; Pebbles	5:06
5.	"You"	Pebbles; Milteer; Sean "Puffy" Combs; Carl Thompson	Combs; Chucky Thompson	4:17
6.	"Happy"	Pebbles; McKinley Horton; Brandon Bennett; Marqueze Etheridge; Organized Noise	Organized Noise; Pebbles	4:58
7.	"Soul Replacement"	Faith Evans; Big Rube; Etheridge; Organized Noise	Organized Noise; Pebbles	4:40
8.	"Club Laid Back" (Reprise)	Pebbles	Pebbles	0:30
9.	"It's Alright"	Pebbles; Milteer; Tony Rich; Ward Corbett	Rich; Pebbles; Richbourg^{[a]}	4:03
10.	"Show Me"	Pebbles; Organized Noise	Organized Noise; Pebbles	5:17
11.	"Straight from My Heart"	Marc Nelson; Darrell Spencer; Kyle West	West; Pebbles^{[a]}	4:20
12.	"Angel"	Pebbles	Pebbles	4:55
13.	"One More Try"	Pebbles; Nelson; Spencer; West	West; Pebbles	3:45
14.	"Long Way to Travel"	Joseph Richards; Tony Rich	Joe Rich; T. Rich	4:24
15.	"One More Try"	Pebbles; Nelson; Spencer; West	West; Pebbles	3:45
16.	"Club Laid Back" (Outro)	Pebbles	Pebbles	1:58
17.	"Are You Ready?" (Mario mix)	Pebbles; Richbourg; Hoyle; Killings; Sylvain; Winans	Winans	4:02
Total length:				59:44

Notes

- ^{^[a]} signifies co-producer(s)

== Production ==
- Tom Cassel – mixing engineer
- Sean Combs – producer
- John Frye – engineer
- Organized Noize – producer
- Pebbles – producer
- Joe Rich – producer
- Tony Rich – producer
- Alex Richbourg – producer
- Chucky Thompson – producer
- Kyle West – producer
- Mike Wilson – engineer
- Mario Winans – producer

== Charts ==
Chart performance for Straight from My Heart
Chart (1995)	Peak position
US Billboard 200	146
US Top R&B/Hip-Hop Albums (Billboard)	43
