= Are You Lonely for Me (The Rude Boys song) =

Single by The Rude Boys

from the album Rude Awakening
- B-side: "Come On Let's Do This"
- Released: 1991
- Recorded: 1990
- Studio: Right Tracks Studios (Cleveland, Ohio)
- Genre: R&B
- Length: 5:07
- Label: Atlantic
- Songwriter(s): Edwin "Tony" Nicholas; Joe Little III; Mike Ferguson
- Producer(s): Jim Salamone; Edwin "Tony" Nicholas; Mike Ferguson

The Rude Boys singles chronology
"Heaven" (1990)	"Are You Lonely for Me" (1991)

"Are You Lonely for Me" is an R&B song by group the Rude Boys. Released as a single, the song spent one week at number one on the US R&B chart. "Are You Lonely for Me" was the group's second number-one single.

== See also ==
- List of Hot R&B Singles number ones of 1991
