= The Rude Boys =

American contemporary R&B group

- Origin: Cleveland, Ohio, United States
- Genres: R&B, soul, new jack swing
- Years active: 1989–present
- Label: Atlantic Records (1989–1993)

The Rude Boys are an American R&B vocal group from Cleveland, Ohio, known for their 1991 hit single "Written All Over Your Face". The group consisted of Larry Marcus, Melvin Sephus, and brothers Edward Lee "Buddy" Banks and Joe Little III.

In 2019, the Rude Boys were inducted into the National Rhythm & Blues Hall of Fame in Detroit, Michigan.

Marcus died in October 2016, Banks in December 2020, and Sephus in October 2026, leaving Joe Little III as the last surviving member.

== Discography ==
=== Studio albums ===
- Rude Awakening (1990)
- Rude House (1992)
- Rude as Ever (1997)

=== Singles ===
Year	Single	Peak chart positions		Certifications(sales threshold)	Album
Year	Single	US	US R&B	Certifications(sales threshold)	Album
1990	"Come On Let's Do It"	—	38		Rude Awakening
1991	"Written All Over Your Face"	16	1		Rude Awakening
1991	"Are You Lonely For Me"	—	1		Rude Awakening
1991	"Heaven"	—	15		Rude Awakening
1992	"My Kinda Girl"	—	4		Rude House
1992	"Go Ahead and Cry"	—	43		Rude House
1997	"Nothing to One"	—	74		Rude as Ever
"—" denotes releases that did not chart

== Awards and nominations ==
- 1991 Billboard Music Awards — No. 1 R&B Single of the Year ("Written All Over Your Face")
- National Rhythm & Blues Hall of Fame (2019)
