= Lucky Charm (song) =

Single by Suns of Light (as the Boys)

from the album Messages from the Boys
- Released: January 6, 1989
- Length: 4:00
- Label: Motown
- Songwriter(s): Daryl Simmons, Greg Scelsa, Babyface
- Producer(s): L.A. Reid, Babyface

Professional ratings
Review scores
Source	Rating
Number One	4/5 stars

"Lucky Charm" is a 1989 single by Suns of Light (as the Boys). The single was their follow up to their debut single, "Dial My Heart", and hit number one on the Hot Black Singles chart for one week.
