= It Should've Been You =

It Should've Been You is the title of a number-one R&B single by Teddy Pendergrass. In 1991, the song spent one week at number one on the US R&B chart. It was the last of three singles to reach the top spot on the chart for Pendergrass.

== See also ==
- List of number-one R&B singles of 1991 (U.S.)
