= Damian Dame =

American contemporary R&B group

Damian Dame was an American R&B group that was active in the early 1990s. It consisted of Bruce Edward "Damian" Broadus (September 13, 1966 – June 27, 1996) and Debra Jean "Deah Dame" Hurd (September 20, 1958 – June 27, 1994).

== Career ==
In 1991, Damian Dame became the first act signed to LaFace Records, co-founded by Kenny "Babyface" Edmonds, for whom Hurd once sang backing vocals. The duo released their eponymous debut album on May 14, 1991, yielding the singles "Exclusivity" and "Right Down to It," which peaked at #1 and #2 respectively on the Billboard Hot R&B/Hip-Hop Songs chart. They also peaked at #42 and #90 respectively on the Billboard Hot 100. The album also yielded the single "Gotta Learn My Rhythm."

== Deaths ==
Hurd was killed in a car accident in Atlanta, Georgia, on June 27, 1994; she was 35 years old. Broadus died of colon cancer at the age of 29 on June 27, 1996, exactly two years after Hurd's death, and less than a week after his first solo album, 199Sex, was released.
