= Pebbles (musician) =

American singer-songwriter

Perri "Pebbles" Reid
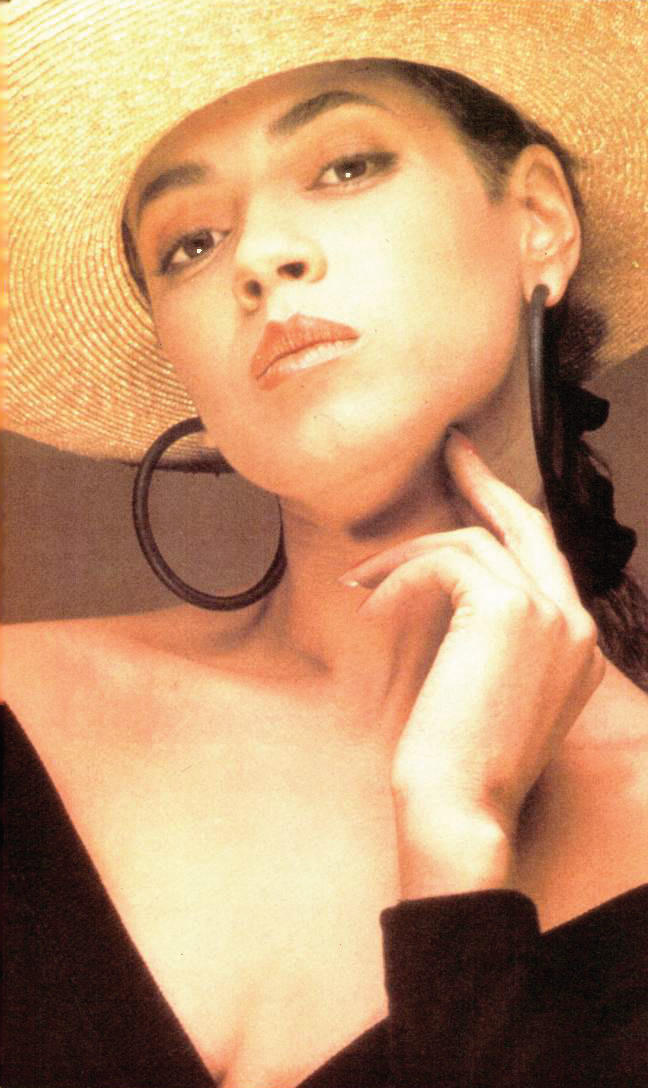
- Pebbles c. 1988

Background information
- Also known as: Pebbles; Perri; Peb; P.
- Born: Perri Arlette McKissack; August 29, 1964 (age 62); Oakland, California, U.S.
- Genres: Dance-pop; R&B; new jack swing; urban contemporary
- Occupations: Singer; songwriter; businesswoman; music executive; pastor; record producer
- Years active: 1980–present
- Labels: MCA; Savvy; Perspective; Pebbitone, Inc
- Spouses: 5, including; L.A. Reid (m. 1989; div. 1996) Otis Nixon (m. 2000; div. 2004)
- Website: sisterperri.com

Perri Arlette Reid (née McKissack; August 29, 1964), known professionally as Pebbles, is an American singer, songwriter, businesswoman, pastor, record producer, and music executive. She is known for her hits during the late 1980s and early 1990s such as "Girlfriend" (1987), "Mercedes Boy" (1988), "Giving You the Benefit" (1990), "Love Makes Things Happen" (1990) and "Backyard" (1991). In addition to a recording career, Reid helped develop the contemporary R&B group TLC. She is now an Atlanta-based minister, known as Sister Perri.

== Early life ==
Reid was born Perri Arlette McKissack on August 29, 1964, one of four siblings to two parents of mixed European and African-American ancestry. Reid's parents divorced when she was around six years old. Her mother raised Reid and her siblings on the income of a waitress and housekeeper.

== Career ==
Reid got her start at age 16 in 1980 as a backing vocalist for the percussionist/band leader Bill Summers and the funk band Con Funk Shun. Reid co-wrote one of Con Funk Shun's singles, "Body Lovers". A local musician gave Reid a production deal which fell through several months later when she became pregnant with her daughter. While working at an Oakland, California, real estate office she met contractor George L. Smith, who she later married. Smith bankrolled Pebbles with $80,000 for a demo tape and video for "Mercedes Boy". The demo and video led to a contract with MCA.

She recorded several hit singles on her own during the late 1980s and early 1990s, including "Girlfriend", composed by L.A. Reid and Babyface (1987), "Mercedes Boy", composed by herself (1988), "Take Your Time", composed by Danny Sembello, Donnell Spencer and Louil Silas Jr. (1988), "Do Me Right", composed by Michael Cooper, Gerald Lamar and Louil Silas (1988) "Giving You the Benefit", composed by L.A. Reid and Babyface (1990), "Love Makes Things Happen", composed by Babyface and L.A. Reid (1990), and "Backyard", composed by L.A. Reid, Babyface and Salt (1991).

Reid's cousin is R&B singer Cherrelle who was featured, along with Johnny Gill, on her 1991 hit song, "Always". Meanwhile, by the time she began scoring her first solo successes, she and Smith had split.

In July 1989, Pebbles formed the Atlanta-based production company Pebbitone and founded her own record label, Savvy Records. Pebbitone managed TLC, which was signed with her then husband L.A. Reid's record label LaFace Records. When TLC filed for bankruptcy in 1995, due to Pebbles' alleged mismanagement regarding their funds, the ensuing conflict damaged Pebbles' marriage. She divorced Reid, and Pebbitone sued LaFace for $10 million.

In 1997, Pebbles underwent a religious conversion. Under her new stage name "Sister Perri", she founded Women of God Changing Lives (WOGCL) Ministries. As an ordained minister, she now preaches and ministers through song. In 2008, after a thirteen-year music hiatus, Reid released her fourth album and debut gospel album, Prophetic Flows Vol I & II, which peaked at #12 on the Billboard Gospel Album Chart. In February 2011, she was named the executive producer/host of Essence's national R&B search.

== Personal life ==
Pebbles has been married five times and has three children. Pebbles gave birth to a daughter, Ashley Victoria Winzer, in January 1982. Her first marriage was to her daughter's father from 1982 until 1983. Her second marriage was to Oakland contractor George L. Smith from 1983 until 1987, and made their home in San Francisco. In July 1989, Pebbles married L.A. Reid. They had one son named Aaron, born in 1990. Reid and Pebbles later divorced in 1996. In 2000, Pebbles married former MLB player Otis Nixon. They divorced in 2004. Pebbles married her fifth husband Excel Sharieff, an administrative law judge, in 2012.

== Discography ==
- Pebbles (1987)
- Always (1990)
- Straight from My Heart (1995)
- Prophetic Flows Vol I & II (2008)
