= L.A. Reid =

American record executive (born 1956)

- Reid in 2011
- Born: Antonio Marquis Reid; June 7, 1956 (age 70); Cincinnati, Ohio, U.S.
- Education: Harvard Business School (Exec. Ed)
- Occupations: Record executive; A&R executive; record producer; businessman
- Years active: 1973–present
- Labels: Hitco; Epic; LaFace; Arista; Def Jam; SOLAR
- Formerly of: The Deele, Pure Essence
- Spouses: Perri "Pebbles" McKissack (m. 1989; div. 1996) Erica Holton (m. 2000)
- Children: 5

Antonio Marquis "L.A." Reid (born June 7, 1956) is an American record executive, A&R executive, and record producer who served as president and CEO of Arista Records from 2000 to 2004, as well as chairman and CEO of the Island Def Jam Music Group from 2004 to 2011 and Epic Records from 2011 to 2017. He co-founded the record label Hitco Entertainment in the latter year, which was sold to Concord in 2022.

Early in his career he was a musician, joining the Ohio R&B bands Pure Essence in 1973, and The Deele (with future business partner Babyface) in 1981 as a drummer. Reid also has an extended musical career serving as a record producer, programmer, and instrumentalist for various recording artists. He founded Hitco Music Publishing in 1996, and co-founded LaFace Records with Babyface in 1989. Reid appeared as a judge on the first two seasons of the American edition of the television show The X Factor, after which he focused on the release of Xscape (2014)—the second posthumous album by American singer-songwriter Michael Jackson.

Reid has won three Grammy Awards, including as a songwriter for his work on Boyz II Men's "End of the Road." His life is documented in his 2016 memoir Sing to Me: My Story of Making Music, Finding Magic, and Searching for Who's Next, which also made The New York Times bestseller list.

== Career ==
=== Beginnings ===
L.A. Reid began his music career as a drummer, with his first appearance on record being with the Cincinnati funk rock outfit Pure Essence. Pure Essence released one solitary 45 in the mid-1970s. They later appeared on local FM rock radio station WEBN's second annual LP compilation, but the group was renamed 'Essence'. Reid would experience more mainstream success when he became a member of the 1980s R&B band The Deele, best known for their 1988 hit "Two Occasions", a song on their third album Eyes of a Stranger. The band had broken up before the success of the single, then reunited to promote "Two Occasions" as it rose up the charts under Dick Griffey's Solar Records. The song peaked at number 10 on the Billboard Hot 100.

=== 1989–2004: LaFace Records and Arista years ===
After The Deele disbanded, Reid and bandmate Kenneth "Babyface" Edmonds founded LaFace in 1989 through a joint venture with Arista Records, with funding from Arista Records creator Clive Davis. The label soon became one of the premier destinations for popular African-American entertainers who created Black Pop music that was easily accessible to both Urban and Top 40 radio formats. Reid signed 14-year-old Usher to the label, whose six album releases have sold 65 million units worldwide. Other popular acts on the label during its peak include Toni Braxton, TLC, and Outkast. Both TLC and Toni Braxton went on to sell more than 65 million records each. Initially headquartered in Atlanta, the label played a significant role in developing the city's music industry.

Hitco Publishing Group

Reid formed the Hitco Publishing Group in 1996, as a joint venture with Windswept Music. While starting up Hitco, Reid, looking to connect to a new market of producers, songwriters and talent, hired Shakir Stewart whom he saw as someone with "a finger on the pulse of the next generation of hot producers in the Atlanta music scene". Shakir's first job in the music industry was as a creative executive at Hitco; he went on to become a senior vice president at Island Def Jam Music Group.

"The most vital lesson [Reid has] learned from 22 years working at record companies? 'That you keep the doors open and the lights on and a star will walk in. I learned to stay in business. People are still buying music, dancing to it and dressing like it. They're using it to sell cars and CoverGirl makeup, so we sell product lines with our artists. The popularity of music is at an all-time high. How we monetize it is sometimes a moving target.'"

— L.A. Reid, regarding the challenge in marketing current music artists, as quoted in The Hollywood Reporter, February 9, 2011.

In May 2000, Edmonds and Reid sold their remaining 50% stake in LaFace to parent company BMG. The label became an imprint of Arista Records, with Arista taking on sales, marketing, and promotional duties for its acts. At this time, Reid also succeeded Clive Davis as president of Arista Records.

In 2000, LaFace was merged into Arista Records with Reid being promoted to president and CEO of Arista Records. In 1997, Reid attended the Harvard Business School six-week Advanced Management Program, in preparation to become CEO of Arista Records. In 2000, Reid signed his first unknown artists, Latin rapper Havana Mena and pop/rocker Avril Lavigne, to Arista. Avril Lavigne's debut album Let Go sold 6 million copies in the United States. As president of Arista Records, Reid signed artists such as Pink (whose November 2001 album Missundaztood sold 5 million copies in the US) and Ciara (whose September 2004 debut album Goodies sold 2.5 million copies in the US).

Under Reid's tenure at Arista, Usher (whom Reid originally signed at LaFace) completed production on his multi-platinum hit 2004 album Confessions, which went on to spawn four No. 1 hit singles and sell 10 million copies in the United States alone. Outkast's Speakerboxxx/The Love Below sold more than 10 million copies and won a Grammy Award for Album of the year.

=== 2004–2012: Island Def Jam Music Group and The X Factor ===
Following the merger of Sony and BMG, L.A. Reid was released from his contract at Arista in 2004 and became the chairman and CEO of The Island Def Jam Music Group in February 2004. Reid is noted for bringing Mariah Carey's career back to prominence with her multi-platinum 2005 album The Emancipation of Mimi after her career had stalled from 2001 to 2003 with less than stellar sales and general lack of public interest for her two previous projects, Glitter and Charmbracelet.

Reid also played a role in the successes of artists such as Kanye West, Rihanna, Bon Jovi, and Justin Bieber and was credited for the musical comeback of Jennifer Lopez with her 2011 album Love?. Reid stepped down as Chairman/CEO of Island Def Jam in March 2011.

In early 2011, Reid became a judge on The X Factor USA for the first season, alongside creator and former American Idol judge Simon Cowell, pop star and dancer Paula Abdul and former Pussycat Dolls singer Nicole Scherzinger, who replaced British recording artist Cheryl Cole.

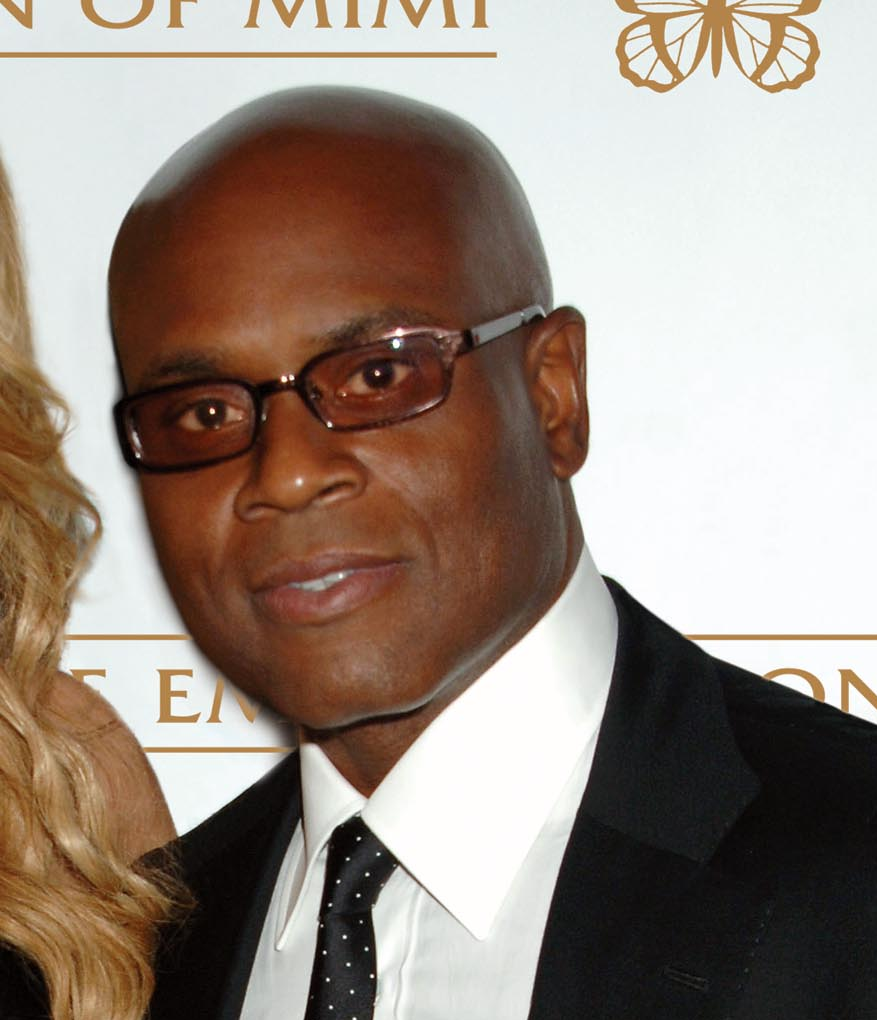
Reid at Mariah Carey's The Emancipation of Mimi release party in 2005

Reid was assigned the Boys category throughout the competition, aided by friend and singer Rihanna at the Judges' Houses stage of the competition in The Hamptons. His final four acts were Marcus Canty, Chris Rene, Astro and Phillip Lomax. Lomax was eliminated on week one of the Live Shows, with Astro being eliminated on week six. Marcus Canty became the eighth contestant eliminated in the competition and was eliminated by the public vote in the semi-final (week eight). Chris Rene was Reid's most successful contestant who became the last contestant eliminated in the competition, bested by Josh Krajcik (who was mentored by Nicole Scherzinger) runner-up and Melanie Amaro (mentored by Simon Cowell) who won the show. After the season ended, Reid worked with Astro, Marcus Canty and Chris Rene on their music careers.

In July 2011, Reid became the chairman and CEO of Epic Records. The label's roster included various former Jive Records artists.

In 2012, Reid returned for the second season of The X Factor USA' along with Simon Cowell, while Nicole Scherzinger and Paula Abdul were axed from the panel, along with Season 1 host Steve Jones. Joining the judging panel were new judges Demi Lovato and Britney Spears, while Khloé Kardashian and Mario Lopez replaced Jones as co-hosts. Reid's category in the "Over 25s" included Tate Stevens, the winner of the season.

Reid announced in December 2012 that he would not return for the third season in 2013 and was replaced by former judge of The X Factor UK, Kelly Rowland.

=== 2013–2017: Memoir, Xscape album, Epic Records ===
One of the projects that Reid embarked on following his judging career on The X Factor, was remaking Michael Jackson songs after his death with the album Xscape, released May 2014. Reid went through 40 years of tracks catalogued by the Jackson estate, and eight tracks of Jackson vocals set to new music from Timbaland and J-Roc, Rodney Jerkins, Stargate and John McClain, the former A&M Records executive who is co-executor of the Jackson estate with John Branca. The originals they worked with were recorded by Michael Jackson from 1983 to 1999, the period just after Thriller and before Invincible. Xscape earned Gold certification.

In 2016, Reid published the memoir Sing to Me: My Story of Making Music, Finding Magic, and Searching for Who's Next. The book received favorable reviews. Soul Train wrote: "In Sing to Me: My Story of Making Music, Finding Magic, and Searching for Who's Next, his memoir written with Joel Selvin, Reid vividly takes readers on a musical journey via fascinating stories and rare photos that chronicle his modest beginnings as a young musician in Cincinnati, to his storied and adventurous path to becoming one of the most successful music executives in history.

Under Reid, Epic had four albums debut at No. 1: Future, DJ Khaled, Travis Scott, and the final album from A Tribe Called Quest. On March 3, 2017 Future became the only artist on the Billboard charts to release back-to-back albums that debuted at number 1. While at Epic, Reid established the label as a hub for hip-hop acts such as Future, Travis Scott, DJ Khaled, and had significant success with pop artists including Meghan Trainor and Fifth Harmony. During his tenure, Epic grew its market share to 3.63 percent, up from 2.56 percent when he took over in 2011.

Reid is the co-author (with Joel Selvin) of The New York Times bestseller Sing to Me: My Story of Making Music, Finding Magic, and Searching for Who's Next.

In May 2017, it was announced that Reid would exit his post at Epic Records following an accusation of unlawful behavior by a female co-worker. In response Reid stated: "I'm proud of my track record promoting, supporting and uplifting women at every company I've ever run. That notwithstanding, if I have ever said anything capable of being misinterpreted, I apologize unreservedly."

=== 2018–2022: Hitco Entertainment ===
In 2018, Reid became founder and co-chairman of Hitco Entertainment, LLC with Charles Goldstuck, the former chairman and CEO of TouchTunes Interactive Networks. Formed in January 2018, the company has offices in Los Angeles, New York and Atlanta and has signed over 15 artists including platinum-selling acts Big Boi (of Outkast) and Dinah Jane of Fifth Harmony; the first release is a new album from Big Boi of Outkast. In April 2018, Empire Distribution, the San Francisco-based independent music company founded by Ghazi Shami, announced that it will provide distribution services to Hitco for their first new album release for Big Boi. In August 2018, Hitco held The Hit List showcase in New York City with performances by Hitco artists including Yella Beezy. Hitco's hit, Yella Beezy's "That's on Me", reached No. 1 at Urban Radio and Top 20 at Rhythm in September & has since went on to sell over 2 million copies worldwide. Songwriter Delacey, who has written for the likes of Halsey and Zara Larsson, joined the Hitco roster as a solo artist releasing "My Man," in March 2019. Also in March, Jennifer Lopez premiered the single "Medicine" featuring French Montana, her first release with Reid's Hitco Entertainment label.

In 2022, the assets of Hitco and its artist recording contracts were sold to Concord Music Group and Hitco ceased operations.

== Awards and recognition ==
On August 30, 2006, L.A. Reid, along with Babyface, was honored as a BMI Icon at the 6th annual BMI Urban Awards. As of 2006, he has won 18 BMI awards. Together with Babyface, Reid has produced and/or co-written penning numerous R&B hits, racking up over 40 No. 1 singles.

Reid was honored with the National Academy of Recording Arts and Sciences' President's Merit Award at the Grammy salute to Industry Icons celebration on February 9, 2013, the day prior to the 55th Grammy Awards. Reid is also a three-time Grammy Award winner. In 2014, Reid received the Harvard University Alumni Award of Excellence in Media.

In March 2016, Reid received an award from BET Honors for The Business of Entertainment Award.

== Philanthropy ==
In 2006, Reid was noted for his philanthropic efforts to bring arts programs to urban youth at the Art for Life Palm Beach fundraiser hosted by Russell Simmons. That year, he also received the UJA-Federation of New York's Music Visionary Award. He has also been involved with the Taste of Hope event for the City of Hope organization and the Robin Hood Foundation. In 2008, Reid wrote and co-produced the song "Just Stand Up" for the television special Stand Up To Cancer, which was performed by artists including Mariah Carey, Beyoncé, Mary J. Blige, Rihanna, Fergie, Sheryl Crow, Miley Cyrus, Melissa Etheridge, Ashanti, Natasha Bedingfield, Keyshia Cole, Ciara, Leona Lewis, LeAnn Rimes, and Carrie Underwood. The record sales for the single were donated to the show's eponymous organization. In 2009, Reid received the Spirit of Compassion Award from UNICEF.

== Personal life ==
Reid has a son named Antonio M. Reid, Jr., born in 1978, and a daughter named Ashley, from a previous relationship. He married Perri "Pebbles" Reid in 1989; the two had a son, Aaron Alexander, in November 1989. Reid and Pebbles divorced in 1996. In 2000 he married Erica Holton. They have two children.

Reid was nicknamed "L.A." by a friend because he frequently wore a Los Angeles Dodgers shirt as a child.

== Sexual misconduct allegations and lawsuit ==
In May 2017, the media reported that one of Reid's female assistants filed a sexual misconduct claim against him. Epic Records executives allegedly refused to intervene at the time. Reid soon departed from Sony's Epic Records.

In November 2023, former music executive Drew Dixon, who worked with Reid at Arista Records between 2000 and 2002, filed a sexual assault lawsuit against him in federal court in Manhattan, alleging that Reid sexually assaulted her on two occasions. The lawsuit, which was filed under the New York Adult Survivors Act, charged that Reid's misconduct forced Dixon out of the music business. Reid settled the case on January 12, 2026, the day the trial was set to begin.

Preceded by Amanda Ghost	Chairman & Chief Executive Officer of Epic Records; July 2011–May 2017	Succeeded by Sylvia Rhone
Preceded by	Chief Executive Officer of Island Def Jam; February 2004 – March 2011	Succeeded by Barry Weiss
