= List of songs written by L.A. Reid (1983–1993) =

Discography

This is a complete list of the songs known to have been written or co-written by L.A. Reid (1983–1993).

Key
†	Indicates single release or single track

Songs written by L.A. Reid, with original artists, co-writers, the samples and originating album, showing year released.
Title	Artist(s)	Co-writer(s)	Originating album	Year	Sample(s)	Ref.
"Body Talk" †	The Deele	Boaz Watson; Melvin Gentry; Carlos Greene; Stanley Burke	Street Beat	1983	—N/a	
"Sexy Love"	The Deele	Babyface; Stanley Burke	Street Beat	1983	—N/a	
"Crazy 'Bout 'Cha"	The Deele	Babyface; Boaz Watson; Jeffrey Cooper; Carlos Greene	Street Beat	1983	—N/a	
"Stimulate"	The Deele	Babyface; Darnell Bristol; Kevin "Kayo" Roberson	Material Thangz	1985	—N/a	
"Suspicious"	The Deele	Babyface; Carlos Greene; Daryl Simmons; Kevin Roberson	Material Thangz	1985	—N/a	
"Personality"	Dynasty	Babyface; Dwayne Ladd	Daydreamin'	1986	—N/a	
"Lovers"	Babyface	Babyface; Darnell Bristol; Kevin Roberson	Lovers	1986	—N/a	
"Take Your Time"	Babyface	Babyface; Daryl Simmons	Lovers	1986	—N/a	
"Circumstantial Evidence" †	Shalamar	Babyface	Circumstantial Evidence	1987	—N/a	
"Playthang"	Shalamar	Babyface; Sid Johnson; Stephen Page	Circumstantial Evidence	1987	—N/a	
"Rock Steady" †	The Whispers	Babyface; Dwayne Ladd; Boaz Watson	Just Gets Better With Time	1987	—N/a	
"Girlfriend" †	Pebbles	Babyface	Pebbles	1987	—N/a	
"Can-U-Dance" †	The Deele	Carlos Greene; Dwain Mitchell	Eyes of a Stranger	1987	—N/a	
"Let No One Separate Us"	The Deele	Babyface; Darnell Bristol	Eyes of a Stranger	1987	—N/a	
"She Wanted"	The Deele	Darnell Bristol; Kevin Roberson	Eyes of a Stranger	1987	—N/a	
"Hip Chic"	The Deele	Darnell Bristol; Kevin Roberson; Carlos Greene; Les Collier	Eyes of a Stranger	1987	—N/a	
"Don't Be Cruel" †	Bobby Brown	Babyface; Daryl Simmons	Don't Be Cruel	1988	—N/a	
"Every Little Step" †	Bobby Brown	Babyface	Don't Be Cruel	1988	—N/a	
"The Way You Love Me" †	Karyn White	Babyface; Daryl Simmons	Karyn White	1988	—N/a	
"Secret Rendezvous" †	Karyn White	Babyface; Daryl Simmons	Karyn White	1988	—N/a	
"Love Saw It" †	Karyn White (featuring Babyface)	Babyface; Daryl Simmons	Karyn White	1988	—N/a	
"Superwoman" †	Karyn White	Babyface; Daryl Simmons	Karyn White	1988	—N/a	
"Don't Mess With Me"	Karyn White	Babyface; Daryl Simmons	Karyn White	1988	—N/a	
"Family Man"	Karyn White	Babyface; Daryl Simmons	Karyn White	1988	—N/a	
"The Lover in Me" †	Sheena Easton	Babyface; Daryl Simmons	The Lover in Me	1988	—N/a	
"No Deposit, No Return"	Sheena Easton	Babyface; Daryl Simmons; Kevin Roberson	The Lover in Me	1988	—N/a	
"Days Like This" †	Sheena Easton	Babyface; Daryl Simmons	The Lover in Me	1988	—N/a	
"One Love"	Sheena Easton	Babyface	The Lover in Me	1988	—N/a	
"Stuck" †	The Mac Band featuring The McCampbell Brothers	Babyface; Stanley Burke; Charles McCampbell	The Mac Band featuring The McCampbell Brothers	1988	—N/a	
"Jealous" †	The Mac Band featuring The McCampbell Brothers	Babyface; Darnell Bristol; Kevin Roberson; Charles McCampbell	The Mac Band featuring The McCampbell Brothers	1988	—N/a	
"Roses Are Red" †	The Mac Band featuring The McCampbell Brothers	Babyface	The Mac Band featuring The McCampbell Brothers	1988	—N/a	
"Dial My Heart" †	The Boys	Babyface; Daryl Simmons	Messages from The Boys	1988	—N/a	
"Knocked Out" †	Paula Abdul	Babyface; Daryl Simmons	Forever Your Girl	1988	—N/a	
"Nothin' (That Compares 2 U)" †	The Jacksons	Babyface	2300 Jackson Street	1989	—N/a	
"Heat of the Moment" †	After 7	Babyface	After 7	1989	—N/a	
"Can't Stop" †	After 7	Babyface	After 7	1989	—N/a	
"My Only Woman" †	After 7	Daryl Simmons; Kevin Roberson	After 7	1989	—N/a	
"One Night"	After 7	Babyface	After 7	1989	—N/a	
"Ready or Not" †	After 7	Babyface	After 7	1989	—N/a	
"Sayonara"	After 7	Babyface	After 7	1989	—N/a	
"It's No Crime" †	Babyface	Babyface; Daryl Simmons	Tender Lover	1989	—N/a	
"Can't Stop My Heart"	Babyface	Babyface; Daryl Simmons	Tender Lover	1989	—N/a	
"Tender Lover" †	Babyface	Babyface; Perri "Pebbles" Reid	Tender Lover	1989	—N/a	
"My Kinda Girl" †	Babyface	Babyface; Daryl Simmons	Tender Lover	1989	—N/a	
"Giving You the Benefit" †	Pebbles	Babyface	Always	1990	—N/a	
"Backyard" †	Pebbles (featuring Salt-N-Pepa)	Babyface; Cheryl James	Always	1990	—N/a	
"Love Makes Things Happen" †	Pebbles (featuring Babyface)	Babyface	Always	1990	—N/a	
"Say a Prayer for Me"	Pebbles	Babyface	Always	1990	—N/a	
"Give It to Me"	Pebbles	Babyface	Always	1990	—N/a	
"Good Thang"	Pebbles	Babyface; Daryl Simmons; Kevin Roberson; Perri "Pebbles" Reid	Always	1990	—N/a	
"Fairweather Friend" †	Johnny Gill	Babyface; Daryl Simmons	Johnny Gill	1990	—N/a	
"Never Know Love"	Johnny Gill	Babyface	Johnny Gill	1990	—N/a	
"I'm Your Baby Tonight" †	Whitney Houston	Babyface	I'm Your Baby Tonight	1990	—N/a	
"Anymore"	Whitney Houston	Babyface	I'm Your Baby Tonight	1990	—N/a	
"Miracle" †	Whitney Houston	Babyface	I'm Your Baby Tonight	1990	—N/a	
"Stone Cold Gentleman" †	Ralph Tresvant	Daryl Simmons; Kevin Roberson; Lasha Johnson; Ralph Tresvant; Bobby Brown	Ralph Tresvant	1990	"The Show" by Doug E. Fresh and the Get Fresh Crew	
"Slave to the Rhythm (Original Version)" †	Michael Jackson	Babyface; Daryl Simmons; Kevin Roberson	Dangerous Leftover Track / Xscape	1991 / 2014	—N/a	
"Exclusivity" †	Damian Dame	Babyface; Bruce Broadus	Damian Dame	1991	—N/a	
"Exclusivity Remix" †	Damian Dame	Babyface; Bruce Broadus	Damian Dame	1991	"Impeach the President" by The Honey Drippers	
"Gotta Learn My Rhythm" †	Damian Dame	Babyface; Daryl Simmons	Damian Dame	1991	—N/a	
"Right Down to It" †	Damian Dame	Babyface; Daryl Simmons	Damian Dame	1991	—N/a	
"Don't Remind Me"	Damian Dame	Babyface; Daryl Simmons	Damian Dame	1991	—N/a	
"Whack It on Me"	Damian Dame	Babyface; Daryl Simmons; Kevin Roberson; Bruce Broadus; S. Gibson; Charles Bobbit	Damian Dame	1991	"Give It Up or Turnit a Loose" by James Brown	
"Trumpet Man"	Damian Dame	Babyface; Daryl Simmons; Bruce Broadus; Debra Hurd	Damian Dame	1991	—N/a	
"60 Seconds (The Conclusion)"	Damian Dame	Daryl Simmons; Bruce Broadus; Tionne Watkins; Lisa Lopes	Damian Dame	1991	"Funky President (People It's Bad)" by James Brown	
"A Lovers Holiday"	Jermaine Jackson	Jermaine Jackson; Babyface; Daryl Simmons	You Said	1991	—N/a	
"Secrets"	Jermaine Jackson	Jermaine Jackson; Babyface; Daryl Simmons	You Said	1991	—N/a	
"Rebel (With a Cause)"	Jermaine Jackson	Jermaine Jackson; Babyface; Daryl Simmons; Kevin Roberson	You Said	1991	—N/a	
"Backyard (Outta the Hood Mix by LaFace Family and Dallas Austin)" †	Pebbles (featuring Salt-N-Pepa)	Babyface; Cheryl James; Carlton Ridenhour; Hank Shocklee; Eric Sadler; Darryl McDaniels; Joseph Simmons	Backyard	1991	"UFO" by ESG; "Bring the Noise" by Public Enemy; "Here We Go (Live at the Funhouse)" by Run-D.M.C.; "Take Me to the Mardi Gras" by Bob James; "Kool's Back Again" by Kool & the Gang; "I Can't Stop" by John Davis and the Monster Orchestra; "Hobo Scratch" by Malcolm McLaren and World's Famous Supreme Team; "I Get Lifted" by KC & the Sunshine Band; "AJ Scratch" by Kurtis Blow; "Going Back to Cali" by LL Cool J; "Fantastic Freaks at the Dixie" by Grand Wizard Theodore & the Fantastic 5 MCs; "Impeach the President" by The Honey Drippers	
"Backyard (Uptown Club Mix by LaFace Family)" †	Pebbles (featuring Salt-N-Pepa)	Babyface; Cheryl James; James Brown; Charles Bobbit; Fred Wesley; John Starks	Backyard	1991	"Papa Don't Take No Mess" by James Brown	
"Treat You Right"	Jermaine Jackson (featuring Babyface)	Babyface; Daryl Simmons	You Said	1991	—N/a	
"Don't You Deserve Someone"	Jermaine Jackson	Jermaine Jackson; Babyface; Daryl Simmons	You Said	1991	—N/a	
"You Said, You Said" †	Jermaine Jackson	Jermaine Jackson; Babyface; Daryl Simmons	You Said	1991	—N/a	
"Word to the Badd!" †	Jermaine Jackson	Jermaine Jackson; Babyface; Daryl Simmons; Lisa Lopes	You Said	1991	—N/a	
"True Lovers"	Jermaine Jackson	Babyface; Daryl Simmons	You Said	1991	—N/a	
"We're Making Whoopee"	Jermaine Jackson	Babyface; Daryl Simmons	You Said	1991	—N/a	
"Gotta Learn My Rhythm (Remix by L.A. Reid and Jermaine Dupri)" †	Damian Dame	Babyface; Daryl Simmons; James Brown; Fred Wesley; John Starks; Carlton Ridenhour; Hank Shocklee; Eric Sadler; Norman Rogers	Gotta Learn My Rhythm	1992	"You're Gettin' a Little Too Smart" by The Detroit Emeralds; "Rebel Without a Pause" by Public Enemy; "The Payback" by James Brown; "Soul Power (Live)" by James Brown; "9mm Goes Bang" by Boogie Down Productions; "Brand New Funk" by DJ Jazzy Jeff & the Fresh Prince; "The Jam" by Graham Central Station	
"Humpin' Around" †	Bobby Brown	Babyface; Daryl Simmons; Bobby Brown; Thomas Keyes; Jan C. "Stylz" Styles; Jimmy Page; Robert Plant; James Brown; The J.B.'s	Bobby	1992	"Dancing Days" by Led Zeppelin; "The Grunt" by The J.B.'s; "Rock Steady" by Aretha Franklin; "Bang Zoom (Let's Go-Go)" by The Real Roxanne (featuring Hitman Howie Tee)	
"Good Enough"	Bobby Brown	Babyface; Daryl Simmons	Bobby	1992	—N/a	
"Pretty Little Girl"	Bobby Brown	Babyface; Daryl Simmons	Bobby	1992	—N/a	
"Ho of My Own"	Highland Place Mobsters	Babyface; Daryl Simmons; Gene Redd; Jimmy Crosby	1746DCGA30035	1992	"Kool is Back" by Funk, Inc.	
"Shock Dat Monkey"	TLC	Babyface; Daryl Simmons; Lisa Lopes; Kenneth Gamble; Leon Huff; Peter Gabriel; James Brown; Morris Dickerson; Charles Miller; Sylvester Allen; Harold Ray Brown; Howard Scott; Lee Oskar; Leroy Jordan; Gene Redd; Jimmy Crosby	Ooooooohhh... On the TLC Tip	1992	"Get Me Back on Time, Engine No. 9" by Wilson Pickett; "Slippin' Into the Darkness" by War; "Kool is Back" by Funk, Inc.; "Shock the Monkey" by Peter Gabriel; "Funky President (People It's Bad)" by James Brown; "Funky Drummer" by James Brown; "The Champ" by The Mohawks; "God Make Me Funky" by The Headhunters (featuring The Pointer Sisters); "Impeach the President" by The Honey Drippers; "Different Strokes" by Syl Johnson	
"Baby-Baby-Baby" †	TLC	Babyface; Daryl Simmons	Ooooooohhh... On the TLC Tip	1992	—N/a	
"Baby-Baby-Baby (Remix by Jermaine Dupri)" †	TLC	Babyface; Daryl Simmons	Baby-Baby-Baby	1992	"Theme from the Black Hole" by Parliament; "God Make Me Funky" by The Headhunters (featuring The Pointer Sisters)	
"Somethin' You Wanna Know"	TLC	Babyface; Daryl Simmons; Kevin Roberson; Lisa Lopes	Ooooooohhh... On the TLC Tip	1992	—N/a	
"Can He Love U Like This" †	After 7	Daryl Simmons	Takin' My Time	1992	—N/a	
"G.S.T."	After 7	Toby Rivers; Daryl Simmons; Kevin Roberson	Takin' My Time	1992	—N/a	
"Give U My Heart" †	Babyface and Toni Braxton	Babyface; Daryl Simmons; Boaz Watson	Boomerang OST	1992	—N/a	
"End of the Road" †	Boyz II Men	Babyface; Daryl Simmons	Boomerang OST	1992	—N/a	
"Tonight is Right"	Keith Washington	Babyface; Daryl Simmons	Boomerang OST	1992	—N/a	
"Don't Wanna Love You"	Shanice	Babyface; Daryl Simmons	Boomerang OST	1992	—N/a	
"There U Go"	Johnny Gill	Babyface; Daryl Simmons	Boomerang OST	1992	—N/a	
"Reversal of a Dog"	The LaFace Cartel (with Damian Dame, Highland Place Mobsters, TLC and Toni Braxton)	Babyface; Daryl Simmons; Lisa Lopes; Melvin Davis; George Clinton; Garry Shider; David Spradley	Boomerang OST	1992	"Fast Peg" by LL Cool J; "Atomic Dog" by George Clinton; "Get on the Good Foot" by James Brown; "You're Gettin' a Little Too Smart" by The Detroit Emeralds	
"Queen of the Night" †	Whitney Houston	Babyface; Daryl Simmons; Whitney Houston	The Bodyguard OST	1992	"Dirty Diana" by Michael Jackson	
"Long Way from Home" †	Johnny Gill	Babyface; Daryl Simmons	Provocative	1993	—N/a	
"Seven Whole Days" †	Toni Braxton	Babyface	Toni Braxton	1993	—N/a	
"You Mean the World to Me" †	Toni Braxton	Babyface; Daryl Simmons	Toni Braxton	1993	—N/a	
"Rock Bottom" †	Babyface	Babyface; Daryl Simmons	For the Cool in You	1993	—N/a	
"Saturday"	Babyface	Babyface; Daryl Simmons	For the Cool in You	1993	—N/a	
"I'll Always Love You"	Babyface	Babyface; Daryl Simmons	For the Cool in You	1993	—N/a	
