= Natural High =

Natural High may refer to:

== Albums ==
- Natural High (Bloodstone album) or the title song (see below), 1973
- Natural High (Commodores album), 1978
- Natural High (Frank Gambale album), 2006
- Natural High (Wataz album), 1998
- Natural High, by Lil Rob, 1999

== Songs ==
- "Natural High" (Bloodstone song), 1973
- "Natural High" (HammerFall song), 2006
- "Natural High" (Merle Haggard song), 1984
- "Natural High", by Colby O'Donis from Colby O, 2008

== Other uses ==
- Natural High (organization), an American substance-abuse prevention organization
- Natural High, a 1970s band signed to Malaco Records
- Natural High (company), an adult video producer

== See also ==
- High (disambiguation)
- Substance intoxication
