= Charles McCormick (musician) =

American musician (1946–2022)

- Born: Charles Edward McCormick; May 8, 1946; Kansas City, Missouri, United States
- Died: April 12, 2022 (aged 75) Los Angeles, California, United States
- Genres: R&B, soul, funk
- Occupations: Musician, songwriter
- Instruments: Vocals, bass guitar
- Years active: 1962–2022
- Labels: Decca, London, Motown, T-Neck/CBS, Mon-Tab, Queen City Records, Warner
- Formerly of: Bloodstone
- Spouse: Marian McCormick

Charles Edward McCormick (May 8, 1946 – April 12, 2022) was an American musician. He was best known as the bassist, founding member, and one of the lead singers of the American R&B/soul and funk band Bloodstone.

== Early and personal life ==
McCormick was born and raised in Kansas City, Missouri, United States. He was the younger brother of well-known Los Angeles newsman and disc jockey, Larry McCormick. He studied music at Central High School, Kansas City. While still in high school, McCormick helped his friend, Harry Williams, form a singing group called the Sinceres in 1962, which would later become Bloodstone. He also served in the army for two and a half years.

== Career ==
Following the formation of The Sinceres, McCormick and the rest of the group toured with a horn band known as the Soulful Emeralds in the late sixties. As the group evolved, they learned to play instruments and became a band. They developed a signature sound that combined sophisticated vocals and instrumentation with elements of funk and rock. By 1971, the band had relocated to England and changed its name to Bloodstone. The band consisted of McCormick on bass and vocals, Williams and Roger Durham on percussions and vocals, Charles Love and Willis Draffen on guitars and vocals, and Melvin Webb on drums. Webb would later be replaced by Eddie Summers. The band would chart thirteen songs between 1973 and 1984, with the McCormick-penned "Natural High" being their biggest hit, reaching the Top Ten on both R&B and pop charts in 1973, becoming their defining song. The group also went through several personnel changes through the years; McCormick left Bloodstone in 1982 and he was replaced by Ron Wilson. Between 1981 and 1984, McCormick recorded and released two singles as a solo artist. He rejoined Bloodstone in 1984. The band continued to play live, though most of the original members died through the years; Durham died in 1973, Webb died in 1982, Draffen died in 2002, Love died in 2014, and McCormick followed in 2022.

== Death ==
McCormick died on April 12, 2022, aged 75, in Los Angeles, California, United States. He is survived by his siblings, children, grandchildren and great-grandchildren.

== Discography ==
=== With Bloodstone ===
The following albums listed below feature McCormick's work with Bloodstone.

- Bloodstone (1972)
- Natural High (1973)
- Unreal (1973)
- I Need Time (1974)
- Riddle of the Sphinx (1974)
- Train Ride to Hollywood (1975)
- Do You Wanna Do a Thing (1976)
- Lullaby of Broadway (1976)
- Don't Stop! (1978)
- Bloodstone's Greatest Hits (1985)
- Now!... That's What I'm Talkin' About (2004)

=== Solo ===
==== Album ====
- Many Moods of Charlie Mack (2012)

==== Singles ====
- "Now You Cry / I Want You For Myself" (1981)
- "Live Wire" (1984)

== Filmography ==
- Train Ride to Hollywood (1975)
