= Tamala Jones =

American actress (born 1974)

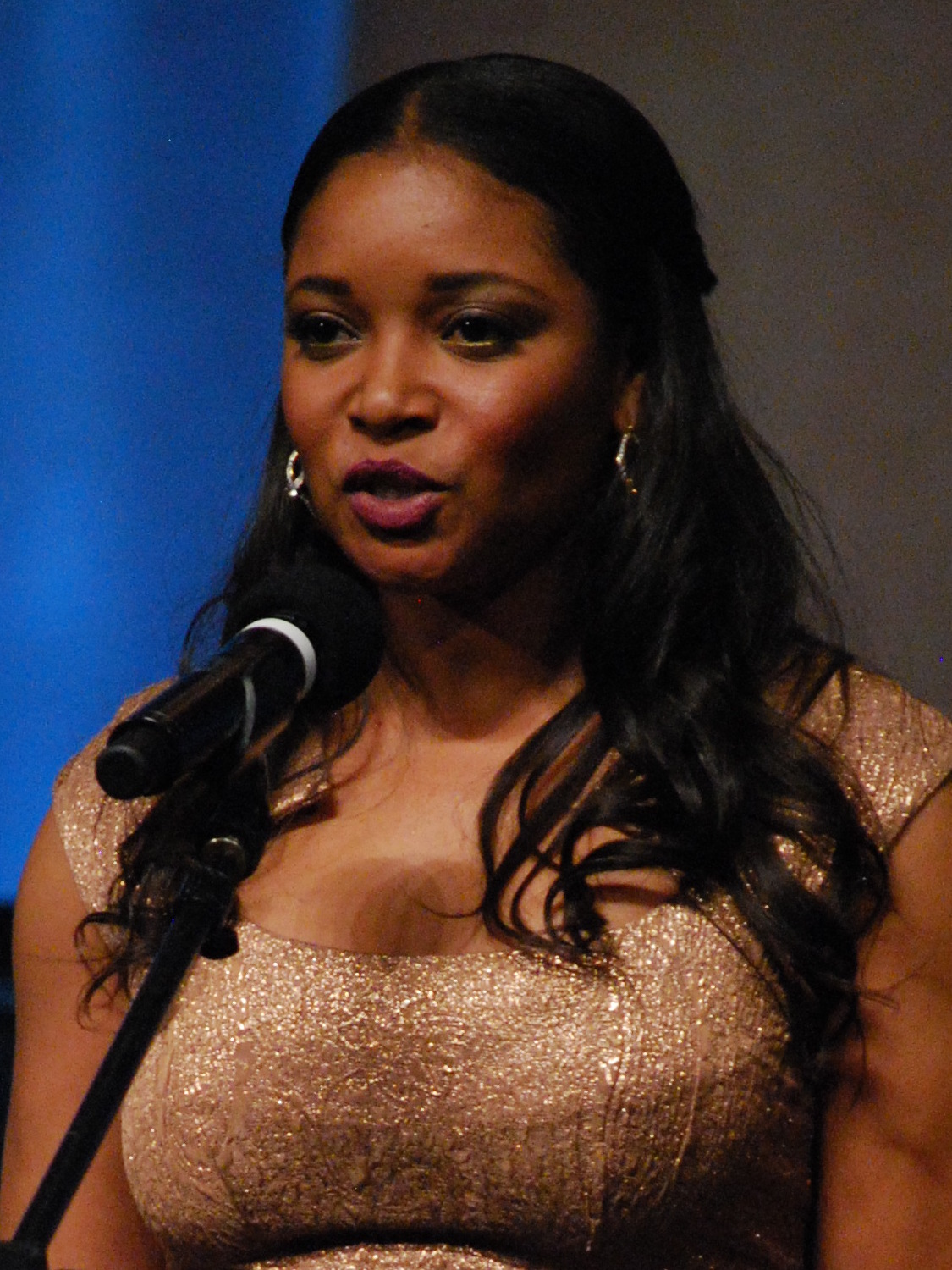
- Jones at PaleyFest in 2012
- Born: Tamala Reneé Jones; November 12, 1974 (age 51); Pasadena, California, U.S.
- Occupation: Actress
- Years active: 1992–present

Tamala Reneé Jones (born November 12, 1974) is an American actress. She is known for her roles in films such as Booty Call, The Wood, Kingdom Come, The Brothers, and What Men Want. Her prominent television roles include Tina, a recurring character on Veronica's Closet; Bobbi Seawright on For Your Love; and Lanie Parish on the ABC crime drama Castle.

== Career ==
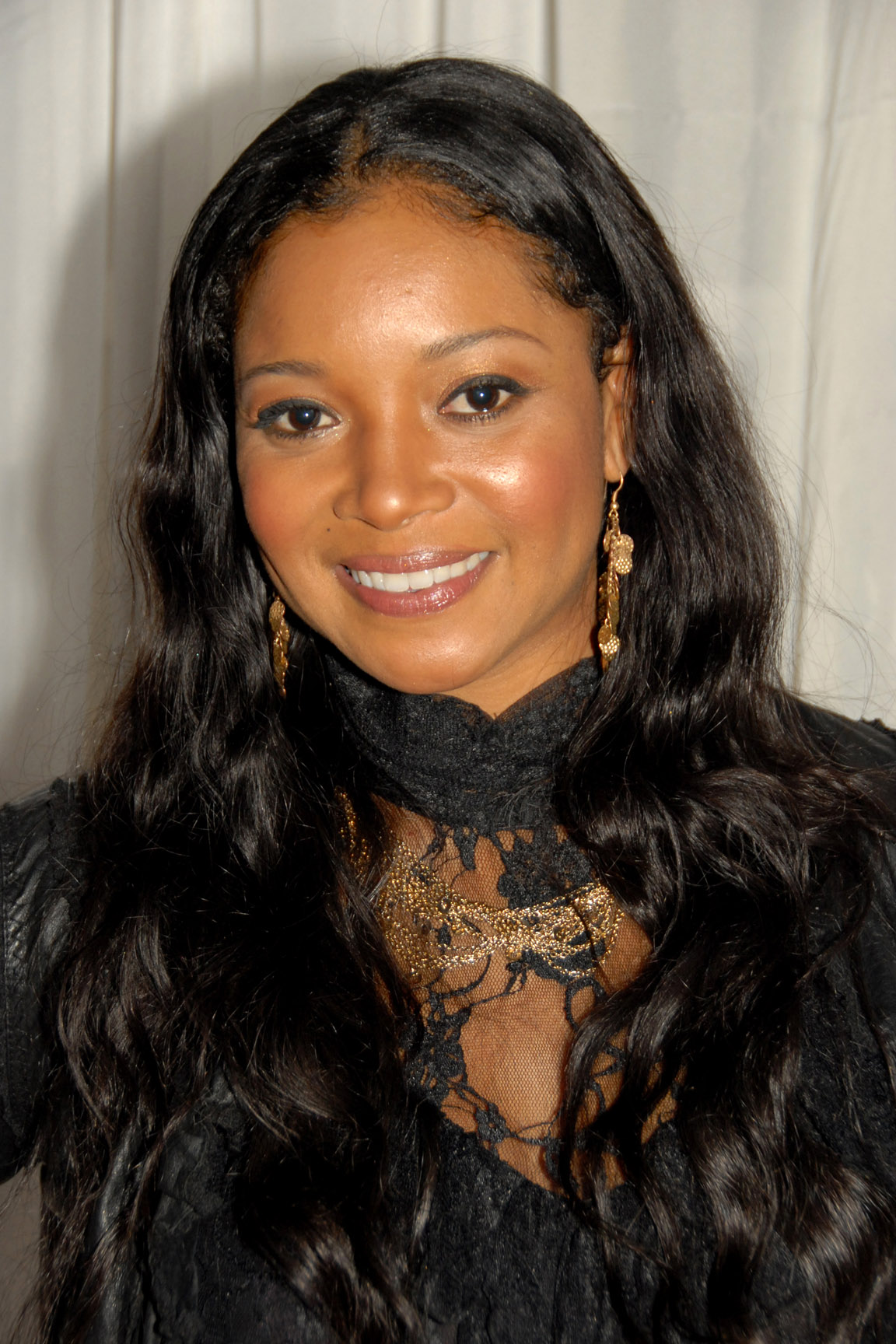
Jones in 2010

Her first acting role was a guest appearance on the teen sitcom California Dreams. This led to a role as a student in the short-lived ABC drama Dangerous Minds. Jones had co-starring roles on the 1998–2002 series For Your Love and the short-lived The Tracy Morgan Show. She had a recurring role as Tonya, an old girlfriend of Flex's (seasons one and four) on One on One. She guest-starred on other television series, including The Parent 'Hood, The Fresh Prince of Bel-Air, Veronica's Closet, My Name Is Earl, Studio 60 on the Sunset Strip, and Malcolm & Eddie.

Her film credits include Booty Call, The Wood, Kingdom Come and What Men Want. She has a small uncredited role in the film Up in the Air.

In 2020, Jones played the role of Lana in the ABC drama series Rebel, which was written by Krista Vernoff.

=== Music videos ===
In 1993, Jones appeared in the music video for "Give It Up, Turn It Loose" by En Vogue. In 2001, she was in the music video for "Girls, Girls, Girls" by rapper Jay-Z with fellow actresses Paula Jai Parker and Carmen Electra. Also that year, Jones was featured in the music video for "Gravel Pit" by Wu-Tang Clan. She appeared in Sleepy Brown’s video “I Can’t Wait”. She appears in Will Smith's video "I'm Looking for the One" and as the President of the United States in the music video for the song "Independent" by rapper Webbie. She appeared in Lil Jon & The East Side Boyz’s video “Real N***a Roll Call (feat. Ice Cube)”.

== Filmography ==
=== Film ===
Year	Title	Role	Notes
1995	How to Make an American Quilt	Anna's Great Grandmother	
1997	Booty Call	Nikki	
1998	Can't Hardly Wait	Cindi, Girlfriend #2	
1999	The Wood	Tanya	
1999	Blue Streak	Janiece	
2000	Next Friday	D'wana	
2000	Little Richard	Lucille	TV movie
2000	Turn It Up	Kia	
2000	How to Kill Your Neighbor's Dog	Laura Leeton	
2000	The Ladies Man	Theresa	
2001	Kingdom Come	Nadine	
2001	The Brothers	Sheila West	
2001	Two Can Play That Game	Tracey Johnson	
2001	On the Line	Jackie	
2003	Head of State	Lisa Clark	
2004	Nora's Hair Salon	Clorie	
2005	Long Distance	Margaret Wright	
2005	Nadine in Date Land	Star	TV movie
2006	Confessions	Tory Adams	
2007	What Love Is	Katherine	
2007	Who's Your Caddy?	Shannon	
2007	Daddy Day Camp	Kim Hinton	
2008	Show Stoppers	Renee	
2008	The Hustle	Nikki	
2008	Who's Deal?	Mrs. Watson	
2008	American Dream	Keisha	
2009	Up in the Air	Karen Barnes	
2009	Janky Promoters	Regina	
2009	Busted	JJ	
2009	Laredo	Maggie	Short
2011	35 and Ticking	Victoria	
2013	Things Never Said	Daphne	
2013	Yellow Ribbon	Karen Rutty	Short
2014	Act of Faith	Jacqueline	
2014	The Box	Adeline	Short
2015	Megachurch Murder	Martha Spears	
2018	Mr. Malevolent	Shanicka	
2019	What Men Want	Mari	
2019	'Til Death	Denise	Short
2019	Deadly Dispatch	Tiffany	TV movie
2019	Holiday Rush	Jocelyn 'Joss' Hawkins	
2022	The Holiday Stocking	Marlow	TV movie
2022	Lola 2	Coach	
2023	Young. Wild. Free.	Ms. McCleary	
2023	Every Breath She Takes	Jules Baker	TV movie
2024	Ordinary Angels	Rose	
2025	#WorstChristmasEver	Cynthia	

=== Television ===
Year	Title	Role	Notes
1992	California Dreams	Surfer Girl #1	Episode: "Romancing the Tube"
1995	The Parent 'Hood	Yvonne	Episode: "Byte Me" & "The Bully Pulpit"
1995	The Wayans Bros.	Wanda	Episode: "Shawn Takes a New Stand"
1995	The Fresh Prince of Bel-Air	Tiffany	Episode: "Not, I Barbecue"
1995	ER	Joanie Robbins	Recurring Cast: Season 1
1996	JAG	Nia	Episode: "The Brotherhood"
1996–1997	Dangerous Minds	Callie Timmons	Main Cast
1997	Soul Train	Herself/Guest Host	Episode: "Episode #26.23"
1997	Duckman	Black Female Student (voice)	Episode: "Das Sub"
1997	Malcolm & Eddie	Caroline	Episode: "Two Men and a Baby"
1997–1999	Veronica's Closet	Tina	Recurring Cast: Season 1, Guest: Season 3
1998–2002	For Your Love	Barbara Jean "Bobbi" Seawright Ellis	Main Cast
2000	City of Angels	Nicole	Episode: "Dress for Success"
2001	The Test	Herself/Panelist	Episode: "The Dysfunctional Test"
2001	Weakest Link	Herself	Episode: "Scene Stealers Edition"
2001	ER	Joanie Robbins	Episode: "Four Corners"
2001–2005	One on One	Tonya	Recurring Cast: Season 1, Guest: Season 4
2003–2004	The Tracy Morgan Show	Alicia Mitchell	Main Cast
2005	Love, Inc.	Terri	Episode: "Bosom Buddies"
2006	Ghost Whisperer	Amy Wright	Episode: "Drowned Lives"
2006	CSI: Miami	Katie Watson	Episode: "Going, Going, Gone"
2007	Studio 60 on the Sunset Strip	Claire	Episode: "The Disaster Show"
2007	My Name Is Earl	Liberty Washington	Guest: Season 2, Recurring Cast: Season 3
2009	Everybody Hates Chris	Darlene	Episode: "Everybody Hates Boxing"
2009–2016	Castle	Lanie Parish	Main Cast
2010	Party Down	Mary Ellison	Episode: "James Ellison Funeral"
2012	RuPaul's Drag U	Herself/Guest Professor	Episode: "From Boxers to Knockouts"
2012	The Soul Man	Yvette	Episode: "My Old Flame"
2012	King Bachelor's Pad	Lieutenant Murray	Episode: "Sherlock Homeboy"
2013	Walk This Way	Herself	Episode: "Vengeance"
2017	Rebel	Jackie	Recurring Cast
2018	Speechless	Robin	Episode: "D-I-- DIMEO A-C-- ACADEMY"
2019	SEAL Team	Gunnery Sergeant Miller	Recurring Cast: Season 2
2019	L.A.'s Finest	Katherine Vaughn 'Kat' Miller	Recurring Cast: Season 1
2020–2023	9-1-1: Lone Star	Detective Sarina Washington	Recurring Cast: Season 1; Guest: Seasons 3–4
2021	Rebel	Lanalee 'Lana' Ray	Main Cast
2022	The Rookie	Yvonne Thorsen	Episode: "End Game" & "Real Crime"
2022	Uncoupled	Mia	Episode: "Chapter 7"
2026	Will Trent	Nakia Cane	Episode: "A Flag in the Mud"

=== Music videos ===
Year	Song	Artist
1992	"Give It Up, Turn It Loose"	En Vogue
1993	"I'm Looking for the One (To Be with Me)"	DJ Jazzy Jeff & the Fresh Prince
1999	"No Love (I'm Not Used to)"	Kevon Edmonds
2000	"Protect Ya Neck (The Jump Off)"	Wu-Tang Clan
2000	"Gravel Pit"	Wu-Tang Clan
2001	"Girls, Girls, Girls"	Jay-Z
2001	"Can Heaven Wait"	Luther Vandross
2004	"I Can't Wait"	Sleepy Brown ft. Outkast
2007	"Independent"	Webbie ft. Lil Phat & Lil Boosie
2009	"Do You Think About Me"	50 Cent
