= The Lover in Me =

The Lover in Me may refer to:

- The Lover in Me (album), a 1988 album by Sheena Easton
  - "The Lover in Me" (song), the title track
- "The Lover in Me", a 2006 song by Jessica Simpson from her album A Public Affair
