= Train Ride to Hollywood =

- Directed by: Charles R. Rondeau
- Written by: Dan Gordon
- Produced by: Gordon A. Webb, George G. Braunstein, Ron Hamady, D. Scott Easton, Thomas Tolbert
- Starring: Bloodstone; Guy Marks; Jay Lawrence; Phyllis Davis; Jay Robinson; Roberta Collins
- Cinematography: Al Francis
- Edited by: James T. Heckert
- Music by: Pip Williams
- Production companies: Arista Films, Crystal Jukebox Film Corp.
- Distributed by: Billy Jack Enterprises
- Release date: October 29, 1975
- Running time: 89 minutes
- Country: United States
- Language: English

Train Ride to Hollywood is a 1975 American comedy/fantasy pop musical directed by Charles R. Rondeau and starring the Kansas City R&B group Bloodstone.

== Plot ==
The movie begins with a Bloodstone cover of "As Time Goes By" over the opening titles.

Bloodstone - Harry Williams, Charles Love, Charles McCormick, and Willis Draffen, Jr. - are about to go onstage for a concert at a theater while their opening act, a vocal group called the Sinceres, perform the Coasters' 1958 hit song "Yakety Yak." In fact, the Sinceres are played by Bloodstone themselves, as "the Sinceres" was the name they performed under before getting a record deal. Bloodstone miss their cue to go onstage, much to the chagrin of a venal producer in charge of the show. He barges into their dressing room to find them drinking champagne and watching an old movie on television. Guitarist/singer Charles Love expresses his fondness for the movies of Hollywood's early Golden Age, declaring, "I don't just want to act in the movies; I want to live the movies!"

After prodding from the producer, Bloodstone make their way toward the stage, but the producer causes singer Harry Williams to fall, hit his head and lose consciousness.

When Williams comes to, he is in a dream in which he and his bandmates are in a railway station, and Williams' dream is being directed by a snooty film director, Eric Van Johnson, who appears repeatedly throughout the movie. The band members learn that a movie studio in Hollywood, Wonder Studios, has open auditions for a new singing group and, lacking the money for train tickets, disguise themselves as porters to board a train bound for Los Angeles, and they perform their original song "Train Ride."

On board the train, Williams poses as a conductor and goes to the club car to collect tickets from the passengers. There he finds, much to his surprise, that the passengers include either famous movie actors from the 1930s and 1940s - Humphrey Bogart, Clark Gable, Jean Harlow, and W.C. Fields, as well as Jeanette MacDonald and Nelson Eddy (who are constantly performing songs from their movie Rose Marie under a snowing cloud) - or famous movie characters - Dracula, Scarlett O'Hara (who is addressed throughout the movie as "Charlotte"), and also Vito Corleone from the 1972 movie The Godfather. Williams also encounters an Arab sheik with seven wives (each one named for a day in the week), whom Corleone indicates that he wishes to adopt. Williams returns to the baggage car and tells his bandmates that "something weird" is going on in the club car, but Love - already aware of the sheik's presence - dons a sheik's headdress and robe in an effort to woo one of the seven wives, while McCormick decides to roam around the train in search of train-track rhythms for new songs.

Draffen and Williams recognize the folly of continuing to pretend to be railroad workers, and Love attempts to romance the sheik's wife Saturday (Tracy Reed) in a sleeper car, during which he sings his original song "What Do I Have To Do?" He almost gets caught by the sheik in a brief silent-movie scene where Saturday pokes her head out from behind a sleeper curtain while Love's legs are exposed. McCormick, meanwhile, meets a black female professor of African-American rhythms and charms her despite her skepticism of his rhythmic abilities while he sings his original song "Hooray For Romance."

Bloodstone and their traveling companions end up in the dining car, where Bogart requests a song while Draffen plays the piano. Draffen responds by tearing into an original Bloodstone song, "Rock 'n' Roll Choo Choo," which references everyone on the train; virtually everyone dances to the music while Draffen's bandmates sing backing harmonies. Bogart, having stood against the piano the whole time, admits when the song is over, "I guess I'm just a sentimental old fool. I love the old songs."

The merriment is interrupted by the sheik walking in looking for the man who was with his seventh wife, then the lights go out; when they come back on, MacDonald and Eddy have been murdered - strangled, it turns out, in someone's underarms. The sheik offers his private car for everyone to gather in to prevent the murderer, likely one among them, from striking again. There, everyone gets high on marijuana from the sheik's hookah pipes before retiring for the night - again, staying together in the sheik's private car to discourage the murderer. Willis Draffen sings everyone to sleep ("Go To Sleep"), but while asleep, Vito Corleone morphs into another famous Marlon Brando character - Johnny Strabler from the movie The Wild One, who turns out to be the murderer.

Johnny awakes to declare his hatred for Hollywood and all of its inauthenticity. He then lies in wait for his next victim. Then Jean Harlow comes out of her sleeper bed and Johnny strangles her to death. Clark Gable is awakened by the noise and comes out of his sleeper bed; Johnny then strangles him to death. Dracula awakes in horror as Johnny comes for him next, but Bogart appears, and Johnny turns off the lights and escapes from the train.

At a stopover town along the railway line, the surviving passengers stage a double funeral for Harlow and Gable with Bloodstone leading the New Orleans-style procession and performing a Dixieland rendition of "Toot, Toot, Tootsie (Goo' Bye!)." At the gravesite, Bogart offers a eulogy for both Hollywood legends, when a car suddenly pulls up and Benny and George, two elderly alumni of the local college, step out. They explain that the college has to pay the mortgage on its property and a benefit show for the effort was a disaster. They have a backup plan - a boxing match against the local heavyweight champion in which a challenger would win the fight and donate the prize money to the college - but no challenger. Worse still, if the college goes under, their star football player - Ronald Reagan - might quit school and become an actor or even a politician who could get elected President of the United States one day. Williams volunteers to fight the champion.

Williams enters the boxing ring at the local arena, declaring himself physically fit (singing "I'm in Shape"), but it turns out that the champion is a gorilla. The fight, being called by a sportscaster in the style of Howard Cosell, goes badly for Williams until his bandmates feed him grits between rounds; he then rallies and defeats the gorilla, saving the college. Love almost gets caught red-handed by the sheik for having fooled around with one of the sheik's wives, but he's able to escape, and Bloodstone and the remaining actors and characters re-board the train and arrive at Los Angeles Union Station. They then proceed to the open auditions at Wonder Studios.

Upon arriving at Wonder Studios, Bogart, Scarlett, Dracula and W.C. Fields are allowed into the auditions but Bloodstone are forced to wait outside for four hours. Love wants the group to look for another studio, but Williams insists on waiting. At that point, a studio attendant calls them into the soundstage. Bloodstone enter a darkened room where an obscured human figure sits in front of them and a spotlight shines on only the group. Assuming the shadowy figure is the head of the studio, Bloodstone sing an a capella version of "Sh-Boom (Life Could Be a Dream)." They pass the audition, earning the last four parts in the production. But Williams, realizing the shadowy figure is not the head of Wonder Studios at all, demands to know who he really is. Another spotlight turns on, revealing that Bogart, Scarlett, Dracula and W.C. Fields have been murdered and turned into wax figures while the shadowy figure laughs diabolically. Another spotlight then shines on an empty dais meant to display the members of Bloodstone, once they've been killed and made into wax figures.

The shadowy figure reveals himself to be Johnny Strabler, who mockingly paraphrases Charles Love's comment from the beginning of the film - "I want to live the movies" - before a band of hooded henchmen subdues the group members. After Love, McCormick and Draffen have been killed and made into wax figures, Johnny is about to begin the process of doing the same to Williams, promising him immortality, "the greatest role anyone could ask for." As he starts to have Williams killed, Williams pleads for his life and suddenly finds himself backstage at the theater after his bandmates have splashed his face with water, waking him from his dream. Bloodstone proceed to the stage to begin their concert, and Williams does a double take when he realizes that one of the stagehands looks like Humphrey Bogart.

Bloodstone take to the stage and perform Barrett Strong's hit song "Money (That's What I Want)" to the delight of the audience (and the producer), bringing the movie to an end.

== Cast ==
- Willis Draffen, Jr. as Himself
- Charles Love as Himself
- Charles McCormick as Himself
- Harry Williams as Himself
- Guy Marks as Humphrey Bogart
- Jay Lawrence as Rhett Butler / Clark Gable
- Phyllis Davis as Scarlett O'Hara
- Jay Robinson as Dracula
- Roberta Collins as Jean Harlow
- Bill Oberlin as W.C. Fields
- Ann Willis as Jeanette MacDonald
- Peter Ratray as Nelson Eddy
- Elliot Robins as Vito Corleone / Johnny Strabler (credited as "the Godfather / the Wild One")
- Peter Gonneau as Assistant Producer / Godson
- John Myhers as the Sheik
- Geri Riddick as the Rhythm Professor
- Michael Payne as Producer / Eric Van Johnson
- Tracy Reed as Saturday (credited as "Stupid bimbo")
- Jack DeLeon as Sportscaster (credited as "News reporter")
- Jessamine Milner as Benny
- Burt Mustin as George

== Production ==
Bloodstone's manager, George Braunstein, was one of five producers of the movie. He had gotten Bloodstone signed to Decca Records in the United Kingdom and London Records in the United States. "Decca [gave] us a big recording contract and then we stayed in London and made records," Braunstein later recalled in an interview with Blake Harris of SlashFilm. "The first two records were flops, but the third one we released ["Natural High"] was a #1 international hit." The group's success endeared Decca president Sir Edward Lewis to him, and because Braunstein was making a lot of money for him, he was able to get the money for Bloodstone to make a movie. He returned to Los Angeles and hired a budding screenwriter named Dan Gordon to write a screenplay. Gordon's screenplay for Train Ride to Hollywood was originally called Night Train.

Braunstein hired Charles Rondeau, whose previous experience had been in directing television programs, to make the movie. Rondeau did not like the script, however, and Braunstein called Gordon, who was serving in the Israeli army, and he turned out to be on active duty in the Golan Heights. Braunstein was able to get Gordon to return to the United States to rewrite the screenplay, and the movie was subsequently made. Braunstein told SlashFilm that many famous people in Hollywood received a screening and enjoyed the film. "We get the movie done," Braunstein said, "and . . . people were looking at and liking the movie. Groucho Marx asked for a screening. Mel Brooks. But I didn't know how to capitalize on it. I didn't know anything at that point."

== Release ==
Train Ride to Hollywood premiered on October 29, 1975, in theaters in the Detroit area, and on that day, the members of Bloodstone and some members of the movie's supporting cast were flown by helicopter to each of the three theaters in the Detroit area that premiered the movie. There were plans for a general release in early 1976. However, it was soon pulled from release due to legal issues between the filmmakers and actor Tom Laughlin's Billy Jack Enterprises, the distribution company. The movie would, however, be aired repeatedly on Home Box Office in 1977.

== Reception ==
Train Ride to Hollywood has received both positive and negative reviews. Writing on his blog Every 70s Movie in 2016, Peter Hanson said, "The movie is pointless and silly, roughly the equivalent of a sketch one might encounter on a ’70s variety show, only stretched to feature length." Yet, Hanson admitted, "Train Ride to Hollywood is so brisk, gentle, lively, and weird that it’s hard to hate the movie, even though many sequences are painfully stupid. After all, where else can viewers watch [Jay] Robinson do a bargain-basement Bela Lugosi imitation while saying, 'Hey, Bogie, don’t bogart that joint!'"

Rod Lott, writing on the Web site Flick Attack in 2011, was far more negative, focusing on racial stereotypes involving the all-black band. He wrote that, in dreaming about Hollywood's early Golden Age, Harry Williams went "into an unconscious world that we must endure along with him for 80-some-odd minutes. When Martin Luther King Jr. said he had a dream, certainly he meant the opposite of this, which casts the guys as train conductors only a step or two above the demeaning level of Stepin Fetchit." Lott added, "Admittedly, the songs Bloodstone wrote for the film aren’t bad . . . but it’s like wrapping a pizza not in a cardboard box, but a discarded diaper. Would you want to eat that?"

When it played in Los Angeles theaters in 1976, Judith Sims of the Los Angeles Free Press praised Bloodstone as "an excellent rhythm and blues/rock group" that generated "terrific songs and happy smiles" in the movie but added that the film "lands on the screen with a thud. Whenever the group isn't singing (which is all too often), the movie sags into an impossible script where second-rate actors mimic famous movie stars (Clark Gable, Brando, W.C. Fields) as part of a dream sequence, all intended as an homage to the good old days and the good old movies." Sims did single out the "Train Ride" scene for praise, calling it a "brilliant musical number."

The veteran rock critic Dave Marsh, however, was much more positive. Marsh called Train Ride to Hollywood a "witty" movie, adding that he thought it was underrated, and he also praised the soundtrack album: "Bloodstone performed material as diverse as 'As Time Goes By' and 'Toot Toot Tootsie' along with 'Sh-Boom' and 'Yakety Yak,' and made it all fit in with the modern originals." Commenting further in an entry on Bloodstone for Vladimir Bogdanov's 2003 book, The All Music Guide to Soul, Marsh wrote, "Train Ride to Hollywood is arguably the funniest picture of the whole '70s blaxploitation boom, derived in equal parts from the Marx Brothers and such early spoofs as The Palm Beach Story and International House."

Also, writing in the Los Angeles Times after its initial release, film critic Kevin Thomas said of the movie, "It's joyous, exuberant, infectious . . . the group [Bloodstone] is pure dynamite." Dale Dobson of digitallyOBSESSED!.com, reviewing the movie in 2000 on home video after having seen it on television in the 1980s, wrote, "I'm happy to say that this strange little movie survives, overcoming any critical tendencies I may have developed in the intervening years with its sheer audacity and joy. The film is a respectful but never completely serious homage to Hollywood . . ., and it's never cynical or mean-spirited."

== Awards ==
Jay Robinson won the Best Supporting Actor award from the Golden Scrolls - now called the Saturn Awards - for his comedic portrayal of Dracula in Train Ride to Hollywood. These awards were created in 1973 by the Academy of Science Fiction, Fantasy & Horror Films.

== Trivia ==
- Train Ride to Hollywood director Charles Rondeau had worked with Phyllis Davis before on the ABC anthology series Love, American Style.
- Bloodstone filmed the "Train Ride" sequence in Los Angeles' Union Station, which was used to stand in for Kansas City Union Station. Harry Williams later explained that Bloodstone were supposed to be leaving their hometown for Hollywood.
- In one scene of Train Ride to Hollywood, Jay Lawrence, playing Gable as Rhett Butler, says to Scarlett, "I gave you kisses for breakfast, kisses for lunch, and kisses for supper . . . and now I find that you're eating out." Lawrence had delivered the exact same line doing a Clark Gable impression in the 1953 war movie Stalag 17, as Sgt. Bagradian. Train Ride to Hollywood was also Lawrence's last movie.
- Ann Willis and Peter Ratray, who played Jeanette MacDonald and Nelson Eddy, were married in real life from 1966 until Willis's death in 2021. Actor Devin Ratray is their son.
