= After 7 =

American contemporary R&B group

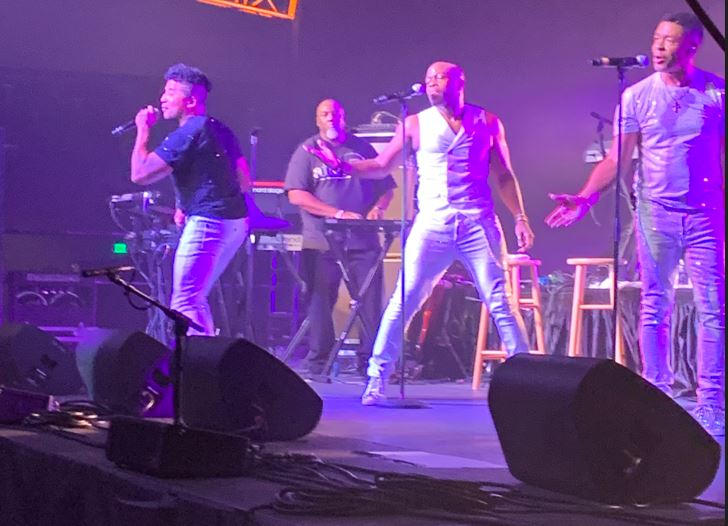
- Kevon, Daniel and Keith in 2022

Background information
- Origin: Indianapolis, Indiana, U.S.
- Genres: R&B; progressive soul
- Years active: 1987–1997; 2006–present
- Labels: Virgin; E1 Music
- Formerly of: Indiana University Soul Revue
- Members: Kevon Edmonds; Wil Robinson; Jeremy Keith
- Past members: Melvin Edmonds; Jason Edmonds; Danny McClain; Keith Mitchell
- Website: after7music.com

After 7 is an American R&B group founded in 1987 by brothers Melvin and Kevon Edmonds, and their friend Keith Mitchell. The Edmonds brothers are the older siblings of pop/R&B singer-songwriter and record producer Kenneth "Babyface" Edmonds, who named the group and helped them get a record deal with Virgin Records in 1988. After 7 released their platinum-selling self-titled debut album in 1989, which spawned three singles "Heat of the Moment", "Ready or Not" and "Can't Stop". "Ready or Not" and "Can't Stop" were No. 1 R&B hits and top 10 hits on the Billboard Hot 100. Their second album Takin' My Time, released in 1992, also went platinum and contained the R&B hit medley "Baby, I'm for Real/Natural High". After 7's Gold-selling 1995 album Reflections was their last album before the group disbanded in 1997. The album included the R&B hit "'Til You Do Me Right. Years later the group resumed touring with Jason Edmonds, son of Melvin Edmonds, replacing his father. Melvin rejoined the group for their successful 2016 comeback album Timeless, which featured 3 adult R&B top 10 hits "Runnin' Out", "I Want You" and "Let Me Know".

Melvin Edmonds died on May 18, 2019, at the age of 65. Jason left the group shortly thereafter and Daniel McClain was added in 2019. Four years later, McClain departed and was replaced by Wil Robinson. At the end of 2024, Mitchell departed the group for a gospel music career and was replaced by singer Jeremy Keith.

== History ==
=== 1977-1987: Early beginnings and formation ===
Marvin Edmonds Sr. and Barbara Edmonds of Indianapolis, Indiana had six sons: Marvin Jr., Melvin, Michael, Kevon, Kenneth and Derek. According to Babyface, Melvin and Kevon were the two best singers in the musical family. The roots of After 7 trace to when Kevon met Keith Mitchell at Indiana University Bloomington in the late 1970s, where they were members of the Indiana University Soul Revue. Kevon and Keith decided to form a group as a hobby and added Melvin. For years Kevon worked at Eli Lilly and Company, Mitchell worked at John Hancock in Chicago and Melvin worked at Chrysler Corp. in Indianapolis. They would occasionally come together to perform in Indianapolis. Mitchell was long thought to be the cousin of Babyface's then-songwriting/production partner Antonio "L.A." Reid; however, this was set up as a marketing tool for the group and was incorrect.

By the late 1980s, the Edmonds' younger brother Babyface had built a successful career singing, writing and producing. He invited Melvin, Kevon and Keith out to Los Angeles, named them After 7, and got them a record deal with Virgin Records.

=== 1988-1997: Career success ===
After 7 released their self-titled debut album in August 1989. The album was mostly written and produced by Babyface and L.A. Reid. The album was certified platinum and produced three singles "Heat of the Moment", "Ready or Not" and "Can't Stop" and two other charting songs "One Night" and "My Only Woman". "Ready or Not" and "Can't Stop" were both No. 1 R&B hits and reached No. 7 and No. 6 respectively on the Billboard Hot 100. "Can't Stop" was also nominated for a Grammy in the category of best R&B performance by a duo or group. After 7 toured with MC Hammer in the summer of 1990, and they won an NAACP Image Award for best new male artist or group that year. In 1991, they released the top 10 R&B hit "Nights Like This" for The Five Heartbeats movie soundtrack. That same year, they took the road as Whitney Houston's opening act on her I'm Your Baby Tonight World Tour.

After 7's second album Takin' My Time was released in August 1992. The album is notable for being their only album without any songs produced by Babyface and L.A. Reid, who were focused on developing other artists. Instead, they contribute as writers, with Reid co-writing the songs "Can He Love U Like This" and "G.S.T.", and Babyface writing "Truly Something Special" and "Love by Day/Love by Night". The production was handed over to Daryl Simmons & Kayo, who co-produced and co-wrote many of the songs on their debut album.

Other songs on the album were produced by Jimmy Jam & Terry Lewis associate Randy Ran and producer Dallas Austin. As a result, this gave Takin' My Time a decidedly "new jack swing" sound and feel. Three singles were released from the album; the first was "Kickin' It", followed by a medley of The Originals' song "Baby I'm for Real" and Bloodstone's "Natural High". The third single was "Can He Love U Like This". The album was certified platinum by the RIAA.

Reflections is the third and last studio album by After 7 before the group split. The album reunited them with producer Babyface and L.A. Reid. They also enlisted the production talents of Babyface protegés Jon B. and Keith Andes as well as newcomers The Boom Brothers. Reflections is the first After 7 album on which the members of the group are credited as both songwriters and executive producers. The album included the R&B top 5 hit "'Til You Do Me Right. Melvin exited the group after the release of Reflections and the group officially disbanded in 1997. After 7's last release on Virgin Records was the compilation album The Very Best of After 7 in March 1997. It included unreleased material, including a cover version of "Sara Smile". Also in 1997, Melvin and Kevon joined their brother Babyface to form the quintet Milestone along with K-Ci & JoJo. The group only released one single, "I Care 'Bout You", for the Soul Food movie soundtrack.

=== 1998-present: Comeback ===
Kevon Edmonds released the solo album 24/7 in October 1999. He invited his nephew Jason Edmonds, son of Melvin, to tour with him as a background singer for years. By the late 2000s, After 7 resumed touring with Jason replacing his father. However, the group decided not to record again without the participation of Melvin. Melvin battled health issues, including a stroke in 2011. Melvin was able to reunite with the group on the 2015 single "I Want You", which reached the top 10 of Billboard's adult R&B songs chart. The group also recorded a version of the song with Babyface. The album Timeless was released in October 2016. It featured the group as a quartet (Melvin, Kevon, Keith and Jason) and included "I Want You" and other top 10 adult R&B hits "Runnin' Out" and "Let Me Know".

Melvin Edmonds died on May 18, 2019, at the age of 65. Jason left the group shortly thereafter and Daniel McClain was added. After 7 released their fifth album, Unfinished Business, in August 2021. Danny was then replaced in 2023 by Wil Robinson and they continue to perform to the present day.

== Discography ==
=== Studio albums ===
Year	Album details	Peak chart positions				Certifications
Year	Album details	US	US R&B	AUS	NZ	Certifications
1989	After 7: Release date: August 22, 1989; Label: Virgin	35	3	124	35	US: Platinum
1992	Takin' My Time: Release date: August 25, 1992; Label: Virgin	76	8	196	—	US: Platinum
1995	Reflections: Release date: July 18, 1995; Label: Virgin	40	7	83	—	US: Gold
2016	Timeless: Release date: October 14, 2016; Label: eOne Music	—	7	—	—	
2021	Unfinished Business: Release date: August 20, 2021; Label: The SoNo Recording Group	—	—	—	—	
"—" denotes releases that did not chart or were not released in that territory.

=== Compilation albums ===
Year	Album details	Peak positions		
Year	Album details	US	US R&B	AUS
1997	The Very Best of After 7: Release date: March 11, 1997; Label: Virgin	97	24	181
2003	The Best of After 7: Release date: December 30, 2003; Label: EMI	—	—	—
"—" denotes releases that did not chart.

=== Singles ===
Year	Single	Peak chart positions					Certifications	Album
Year	Single	US	US R&B	AUS	NZ	UK	Certifications	Album
1989	"Heat of the Moment"	19	5	107	28	87		After 7
1989	"Don't Cha' Think"	—	25	—	—	—		After 7
1990	"Ready or Not" ^{B}	7	1	—	—	—	US: Gold	After 7
1990	"Can't Stop" ^{B}	6	1	80	9	54	US: Gold	After 7
1990	"My Only Woman"	—	36	—	—	—		After 7
1991	"Nights Like This" ^{B}	24	7	—	—	—		The Five Heartbeats
1992	"Kickin' It"	45	6	191	29	—		Takin' My Time
1992	"Baby, I'm for Real/Natural High" (medley)	55	5	—	—	—		Takin' My Time
1993	"Can He Love U Like This"	—	22	—	—	—		Takin' My Time
1993	"Truly Something Special"	—	49	—	—	—		Takin' My Time
1994	"Gonna Love You Right"	87	15	—	—	—		Sugar Hill
1994	"Not Enough Hours in the Night"	—	56	—	—	—		Beverly Hills 90210: The College Years
1995	"'Til You Do Me Right"	31	5	16	11	—	AUS: Gold	Reflections
1995	"Damn Thing Called Love"	—	33	—	38	—		Reflections
1996	"How Do You Tell the One"	—	60	—	—	—		Reflections
1996	"I Like It Like That"	—	—	46	—	—		Reflections
1997	"Sara Smile" ^{[A]}	—	31	99	—	130		The Very Best of After 7
2015	"I Want You" ^{[C]}	—	6	—	—	—		Timeless
2016	"Let Me Know" ^{[C]}	—	6	—	—	—		Timeless
2017	"Runnin' Out" ^{[C]}	—	3	—	—	—		Timeless
2017	"Too Late" ^{[C]}	—	8	—	—	—		Timeless
2018	"If I"^{[C]}	—	8	—	—	—		Timeless
2021	"Bittersweet"	—	8	—	—	—		Unfinished Business
2021	"No Place Like You"	—	11	—	—	—		Unfinished Business
2021	"Tomorrow Can Wait"	—	—	—	—	—		Unfinished Business
"—" denotes releases that did not chart or were not released in that territory.

Notes

- ^{A} Did not chart on the Hot R&B/Hip-Hop Songs chart (Billboard rules at the time prevented album cuts from charting). Chart peak listed represent the Hot R&B/Hip-Hop Airplay chart.
- ^{B} "Ready or Not," "Can't Stop" and "Nights Like This" charted on the Billboard Adult Contemporary chart as well, reaching No. 7, No. 23, and No. 36 respectively.
- ^{C} Did not chart on the Hot R&B/Hip-Hop Songs chart. Chart peak listed represent the Billboard Adult R&B Songs chart. These singles charted on the Billboard Hot R&B/Hip-Hop Airplay chart as well, reaching No. 29, No. 38, No. 24, No. 41 and No. 36 respectively.
