= Takin' My Time (After 7 album) =

Studio album by After 7
- Released: August 25, 1992
- Recorded: 1991–1992
- Studio: Doppler Studios; Studio LaCoCo (Atlanta, Georgia); Larrabee Sound Studios (West Hollywood, California); Flyte Tyme Studios (Edina, Minnesota); Right Track Recording (Manhattan, New York); Encore Studios (Los Angeles, California)
- Genre: New jack swing
- Length: 52:12
- Label: Virgin
- Producer: Daryl Simmons & Kayo; Dallas Austin; Randy Ran

After 7 chronology
After 7 (1989)	Takin' My Time (1992)	Reflections (1995)

Professional ratings
Review scores
Source	Rating
AllMusic	3/5 stars

Takin' My Time is the second studio album by R&B trio After 7. It peaked at #76 on the Billboard 200. It was their first album to be released under Virgin Records after being acquired by EMI Music in 1992. The album is notable for being their first and only album without any songs produced by L.A. Reid and Babyface. Instead, they contribute as writers, with Reid co-writing the songs "Can He Love U Like This" and "G.S.T.", and Babyface writing "Truly Something Special" and "Love By Day/Love By Night". The production was handed over to Daryl Simmons & Kayo, who co-produced and co-wrote many of the songs on their self-titled debut.

Other songs on the album were produced by Jimmy Jam & Terry Lewis associate Randy Ran and producer Dallas Austin, who was fresh off the successes of the debut albums he worked on by Boyz II Men, Another Bad Creation and TLC. As a result, this gave Takin' My Time a decidedly "new jack swing" sound and feel. Three singles were released from the album; the first was "Kickin' It", followed by a medley of The Originals' song "Baby I'm for Real" and Bloodstone's "Natural High". The third single "Can He Love U Like This" featured a music video that was directed by Charles Stone III. The album was certified Gold by the RIAA.

== Track listing ==
1. "All About Love" (Dallas Austin, H. Randall Davis, Michael Weinstein) 4:47
2. "Kickin' It" (Dallas Austin, H. Randall Davis, Langston Ell Richey) 4:52
3. "Can He Love U Like This" (Daryl Simmons, Antonio "L.A." Reid) 5:19
4. "Truly Something Special" (Kenneth "Babyface" Edmonds, Boaz Watson) 5:01
5. "Baby, I'm for Real/Natural High" (Anna Gordy Gaye, Marvin Gaye, Charles McCormick) 5:08
6. "Takin' My Time" (Interlude) 0:53
7. "No Better Love" (Dallas Austin, H. Randall Davis) 4:15
8. "Takin' My Time" (H. Randall Davis, Danny Williams) 5:24
9. "G.S.T." (Toby Rivers, Kevin Roberson, Daryl Simmons, Antonio "L.A." Reid) 4:55
10. "Love By Day, Love By Night" (Daryl Simmons, Kenneth "Babyface" Edmonds, Kevin Roberson) 4:54
11. "He Said, She Said" (Dallas Austin, H. Randall Davis, Michael Weinstein) 4:05
12. "Takin' My Time" (Reprise) 2:32

== Personnel ==
Credits adapted from liner notes.

- Lead and background vocals - After 7
- Drum Programming - Dallas Austin, Daryl Simmons, Randy Ran, L.A. Reid, Donald Parks
- Drums - L.A. Reid
- Keyboards - Dallas Austin, Daryl Simmons, Randy Ran
- Synthesizer - Babyface, Bo Watson, Vance Taylor
- Synclavier Programming - Donald Parks
- MIDI Programming & Fairlight Synthesizer - Rick Sheppard
- Fender Bass Guitar & Moog Source Bass - Kayo
- Violin - Sonya Robinson
- Saxophone - Kirk Whalum
- Recording engineer - Darin Prindle, Thom Kidd, Jim Zumpano
- Mixing - Steve Hodge, Barney Perkins, Jim Zumpano, Alan Meyerson, Dallas Austin, Dave Way
- Executive Producer - Gemma Corfield, After 7
- Photography - Daniela Federici, Louise Obrien, Daniel Schridde
- Art Direction - Mick Haggerty
- Design - Tom Dolan

== Charts ==
=== Weekly charts ===
Chart (1992)	Peak position
Australian Albums (ARIA)	196
US Billboard 200	76
US Top R&B/Hip-Hop Albums (Billboard)	8

=== Year-end charts ===
Chart (1992)	Position
US Top R&B/Hip-Hop Albums (Billboard)	74

== Certifications ==
Region	Certification	Certified units/sales
United States (RIAA)	Gold	500,000^{^}
^{^} Shipments figures based on certification alone.
