= Heat of the Moment =

Heat of the Moment may refer to:

- Passion (emotion)
- "Heat of the Moment" (Asia song), 1982
- "Heat of the Moment" (After 7 song), 1989

== See also ==
- "In the Heat of the Moment", 2014 song by Noel Gallagher's High Flying Birds
