= 'Til You Do Me Right =

1995 single by After 7

Single by After 7

from the album Reflections
- Released: June 20, 1995
- Length: 4:55 (album version); 4:12 (radio edit)
- Label: Virgin
- Songwriters: Babyface; Kevon Edmonds; Melvin Edmonds
- Producer: Babyface

After 7 singles chronology
"Not Enough Hours in the Night" (1994)	"'Til You Do Me Right" (1995)	"Damn Thing Called Love" (1995)

"'Til You Do Me Right" is a song by American R&B group After 7. The song is the opening track on the group's third studio album, Reflections, and was issued as the album's first single in June 1995. It was their final hit on the US Billboard Hot 100, peaking at number 31 in 1995, and it also reached the top 20 in Australia and New Zealand; in the former nation, the song is certified gold for shipping over 35,000 copies.

== Charts ==
=== Weekly charts ===
Chart (1995–1996)	Peak position
Australia (ARIA)	16
New Zealand (Recorded Music NZ)	11
US Billboard Hot 100	31
US Hot R&B Singles (Billboard)	5
US Top 40/Rhythm-Crossover (Billboard)	12
US Cash Box Top 100	20

=== Year-end charts ===
Chart (1995)	Position
US Billboard Hot 100	88
US Hot R&B Singles (Billboard)	35

Chart (1996)	Position
Australia (ARIA)	67

== Certifications ==
Region	Certification	Certified units/sales
Australia (ARIA)	Gold	35,000^{^}
^{^} Shipments figures based on certification alone.

== Release history ==
Region	Date	Format(s)	Label(s)	Ref.
United States	June 13, 1995	Rhythmic contemporary; contemporary hit radio	Virgin	
United States	June 20, 1995	CD	Virgin	
Japan	July 26, 1995	Mini-CD	Virgin	
Australia	October 16, 1995	CD	Virgin	
