= Give Me Your Heart =

Give Me Your Heart may refer to:

== Songs ==
- "Give Me Your Heart" (Bloodstone song), 1975
- "Give Me Your Heart" (Romeo song), 2012
- "Give Me Your Heart", by Backstreet Boys, a B-side of the single "Quit Playing Games (With My Heart)", 1996
- "Give Me Your Heart", by John Pizzarelli from New Standards, 1994

== Other uses ==
- Give Me Your Heart (film), a 1936 American film directed by Archie Mayo
- Give Me Your Heart: Tales of Mystery and Suspense, a 2011 short story collection by Joyce Carol Oates
