= 24/7 (Kevon Edmonds song) =

1999 single by Kevon Edmonds

Single by Kevon Edmonds

from the album 24/7
- B-side: "I Want You More"
- Released: November 16, 1999
- Recorded: 1999
- Genre: R&B
- Length: 4:34 (Album Version); 3:45 (Video Version)
- Label: RCA
- Songwriters: Angelo Ray; David Scott
- Producer: Angelo Ray

Kevon Edmonds singles chronology
"24/7" (1999)	"No Love (I'm Not Used to)" (2000)

Music video
- "24/7" on YouTube

"24/7" is a song performed by American R&B singer Kevon Edmonds, released on November 16, 1999 as his debut single and both the lead single and title track from his debut studio album of the same name. The song is his only hit to date on the Billboard Hot 100, peaking at #10 on the chart for 2 weeks in late December 1999.

The song was certified gold by the RIAA on January 10, 2000.

== Music video ==
The official music video for "24/7" was directed by David Nelson.

== Chart positions ==
=== Weekly charts ===
Chart (1999)	Peak position
US Billboard Hot 100	10
US Hot R&B/Hip-Hop Singles & Tracks (Billboard)	2
US Rhythmic Top 40 (Billboard)	37

=== Year-end charts ===
Chart (2000)	Position
US Billboard Hot 100	92
US Hot R&B/Hip-Hop Songs (Billboard)	26

== Certifications ==
Region	Certification	Certified units/sales
United States (RIAA)	Gold	500,000^{^}
^{^} Shipments figures based on certification alone.
