= Jay Lawrence (actor) =

American comedian and actor (1924–1987)

- Jay Lawrence in Stalag 17, 1953
- Born: Jay Storch; April 24, 1924; New York City, U.S.
- Died: June 18, 1987 (aged 63); Los Angeles, California, U.S.
- Occupations: Comedian; actor
- Years active: 1940–1987

Jay Lawrence (born Jay Storch; April 24, 1924 – June 18, 1987) was an American stand-up comedian, actor, and the younger brother of stand-up comedian and actor Larry Storch.

== Early life ==
Lawrence was born in New York City to Alfred Storch, a realtor, and his wife, Sally (née Kupperman) Storch, a telephone operator. He and his brother Larry attended the same school as comedian and actor Don Adams, who remained lifelong friends with him and Storch.

== Career ==
Lawrence first got his start in show business alongside his more famous brother Larry as a stand-up comic in New York City in the 1940 while in his teens. A well in-demand television actor in Hollywood, Lawrence's acting career spanned from 1950 to 1979, and he appeared in dramatic, variety show and sitcom projects such as The Colgate Comedy Hour (1950), the original TV Dragnet program in 2 appearances in 1955 and 1959, Get Smart (1968), and Mayberry R.F.D. (1968). In the early 1960s, he fronted for and performed at a then-popular New York nightclub (The Crystal Room) on East 54th Street in Manhattan.

=== Film and voice over projects ===
In addition to his work in television, Lawrence also appeared in nine film projects, also lending his voice to the 1974 adult-themed animated feature-length project The Nine Lives of Fritz the Cat. He also appeared as a voice actor on the ABC-TV animated Saturday morning cartoon Hong Kong Phooey (1974). Also as a film actor, Jay Lawrence performed in movies such as The Big Chase (1954), in which he portrayed Jim Bellows, Train Ride to Hollywood (1975), and The Halliday Brand (1957), and a prominent supporting role as Sgt. Bagradian who gave brilliant, dead-on impressions of leading film actors in the critically acclaimed Billy Wilder directed war/German POW prison camp dramedy Stalag 17 (1953). He was alongside actor William Holden, who won an Oscar for his role for Best Actor in a drama film.

== Death ==
Lawrence died on June 18, 1987, in Los Angeles. He is interred at the Italian Cemetery in Colma, California.

== Filmography ==
Year	Title	Role	Notes
1950	A Lady Without Passport	Bartender	Uncredited
1953	Cry of the Hunted	Deputy	Uncredited
1953	Stalag 17	Sgt. Bagradian	
1954	Riding Shotgun	Lewellyn	Uncredited
1954	The Big Chase	Jim Miggs	
1954	The Silver Chalice	Bystander	Uncredited
1954	Young at Heart	Restaurant Patron	Uncredited
1955	A Lawless Street	Townsman	Uncredited
1956	Walk the Dark Street	The Detective	Uncredited
1957	The Halliday Brand	Townsman #2	
1973	Heavy Traffic		Voice
1975	Train Ride to Hollywood	Rhett Butler / Clark Gable	(final film role)
