= After 7 (After 7 album) =

Studio album by After 7
- Released: August 22, 1989
- Recorded: 1988–1989
- Studio: Elumba, Studio Masters, Soundscape, Galaxy Sound
- Genre: R&B
- Length: 35:24
- Label: Virgin
- Producer: L.A. Reid, Babyface, De'Rock, Kayo

After 7 chronology
After 7 (1989)	Takin' My Time (1992)

Singles from After 7
- 1. "Heat of the Moment" Released: 1989; 2. "Ready or Not" Released: February 20, 1990; 3. "Can't Stop" Released: May 16, 1990

After 7 is the debut album by After 7. Released in 1989, the album was certified Platinum by the RIAA on November 27, 1990, and spawned two No. 1 R&B hits, "Ready or Not" and "Can't Stop." Those songs also reached No. 7 and No. 6, on the Billboard Hot 100.

== Critical reception ==
Professional ratings
Review scores
Source	Rating
AllMusic	4/5 stars
The Encyclopedia of Popular Music	4/5 stars
The Rolling Stone Album Guide	3/5 stars

The Rolling Stone Album Guide wrote that the album "benefits more from the ingenuity of producers L.A. Reid and BabyFace than from the skill of singers Melvin and Kevon Edmonds."

== Track listing ==
1. "Don't Cha' Think" – 3:59 (Don Parks, Daryl Simmons, Kayo)
2. "Heat of the Moment" – 4:27 (Babyface, L.A. Reid)
3. "Can't Stop" – 4:07 (Babyface, Reid)
4. "My Only Woman" – 4:41 (Kayo, Reid, Simmons)
5. "Love's Been So Nice" – 4:27 (Babyface, Parks)
6. "One Night" – 5:00 (Babyface, Reid)
7. "Ready or Not" – 4:35 (Babyface, Reid)
8. "Sayonara" – 4:03 (Babyface, Reid)

== Personnel ==
- Keith Mitchell, Kevon Edmonds, Melvin Edmonds: Vocals
- L.A. Reid: Drums, percussion
- Babyface: Keyboards, bass
- Kayo: Moog bass, keyboards, drums, percussion
- Daryl Simmons: Keyboards, drums, percussion
- Donald Parks: Synthesizer programming (Fairlight CMI, Oberheim OB-8, Emulator II, Yamaha DX7)
- Dee Bristol, Kathy Hazzard, Lynn Mabry: Additional backing vocals

== Production ==
- Tracks 1 and 4 arranged, produced and mixed by De'rock and Kayo. Recorded by David Rideau.
- Tracks 2, 3, 5, 6, 7 and 8 arranged and produced by L.A. & Babyface; tracks 2, 6 and 7 co-produced by De'rock and Kayo. Track 2 recorded by David Rideau and Tim Jacquette; mixed by Keith Cohen and L.A. Reid. Track 3 recorded by Jon Gass, Jon Gaggenheim and Keith Cohen; mixed by Keith Cohen. Track 5 recorded by Jon Gass; mixed by Barney Perkins, De'rock and Kayo. Track 6 recorded by David Rideau, Donnell Sullivan and Jon Gass; mixed by Keith Cohen. Track 7 recorded by Donnell Sullivan and Jon Gass; mixed by Barney Perkins. Track 8 recorded by Jon Gass; mixed by De'rock, Kayo and Keith Cohen.
- Mastered at Bernie Grundman Mastering.

== Charts ==
=== Weekly charts ===
Chart (1989–1991)	Peak position
Australian Albums (ARIA)	124
New Zealand Albums (RMNZ)	35
US Billboard 200	35
US Top R&B/Hip-Hop Albums (Billboard)	3

=== Year-end charts ===
Chart (1990)	Position
US Billboard 200	64
US Top R&B/Hip-Hop Albums (Billboard)	4

== Certifications ==
Region	Certification	Certified units/sales
United States (RIAA)	Platinum	1,000,000^{^}
^{^} Shipments figures based on certification alone.
