= 24/7 (Kevon Edmonds album) =

Studio album by Kevon Edmonds
- Released: October 26, 1999
- Recorded: Brandon's Way Recording; The TracKen Place; Los Angeles, California; Track Record, Inc. North Hollywood, California; D.A.R.P. Studios; Silent Sound Studios; Atlanta, Georgia
- Genre: R&B
- Length: 53:01
- Label: RCA
- Producer: Babyface, Tim & Bob, Damon Thomas, Angelo Ray, Tommy Sims, Marc Harris, Daryl Simmons, Gregory Curtis Sr., Armando Colon

Kevon Edmonds chronology
24/7 (1999)	'Who Knew' (2009)

Singles from 24/7
- 1. "24/7" Released: 1999; 2. "No Love (I'm Not Used to)" Released: October 12, 1999; 3. "Love Will Be Waiting" Released: 2000

Professional ratings
Review scores
Source	Rating
AllMusic	3.5/5 stars

24/7 is the debut solo album from Kevon Edmonds, after he left the group After 7. Released on October 26, 1999, via RCA Records, the album peaked at number 77 on the Billboard 200. The album's title track was certified gold and was the only album single to reach the Billboard Hot 100, peaking at number 10. The second single, "No Love (I'm Not Used to)", was released to radio, and rose to number 25 on Billboard's R&B chart.

== Track listing ==
Credits adapted from liner notes.

No.	Title	Writer(s)	Length
1.	"Never Love You"	Babyface	4:42
2.	"Love Will Be Waiting"	Babyface, Marc Harris, Tommy Sims	4:14
3.	"24/7"	Angelo Ray, David Scott, Anthony Smith	3:50
4.	"When I'm With You"	Tim Kelley, Bob Robinson	3:56
5.	"How Often"	Walter Afanasieff, Babyface, Robin Thicke	4:27
6.	"Baby Come to Me"	Babyface, Kevon Edmonds, Robert Newt, Johnnie Newt, Damon Thomas	3:58
7.	"A Girl Like You" (featuring Babyface and Melvin Edmonds)	Babyface	5:19
8.	"I Want You More"	Tim Kelley, Bob Robinson, Kevon Edmonds	4:34
9.	"No Love (I'm Not Used to)"	Daryl Simmons	5:09
10.	"Sensitive Mood"	Gregory Curtis Sr.	5:12
11.	"Anyway"	Gregory Curtis Sr., Steve Kipner	3:37
12.	"Tell Me"	Armando Colon, Kevon Edmonds, Anthem	4:03
Total length:			53:01

== Personnel ==
Credits adapted from liner notes.

- Kevon Edmonds – lead and background vocals
- Babyface – keyboards, drum programming, electric guitar
- Daryl Simmons – keyboards, drum programming
- Gregory Curtis Sr. – keyboards, drum programming, background vocals
- Armando Colon – keyboards, drum programming, guitar
- Tim Kelley – acoustic piano, drum programming, bass, keyboards, mixing
- Bob Robinson – keyboards, acoustic piano
- Nathan East – bass
- Greg Phillinganes – piano
- Tommy Sims – bass, electric guitar, background vocals
- Michael Thompson – guitar
- Ricky Lawson – drums
- Damon Thomas – keyboards, drum programming
- Ronnie Garrett – bass
- Tony Williams – additional drum programming
- Dorian Daniels – additional drum programming
- Marc Nelson – background vocals
- IveyGirl -background vocals
- Jason Edmonds – background vocals
- Shanice Wilson – background vocals
- N8 – background vocals
- Melvin Edmonds – background vocals
- Charlotte Gibson – background vocals
- Robert Newt – background vocals
- Anthem – background vocals
- Paul Boutin – recording engineer
- Brandon Harris – recording engineer
- Ryan Dorn – recording engineer
- Brian Smith – recording engineer, mixing
- Jon Gass – mixing
- Dave Pensado – mixing
- Brad Gilderman – mixing
- Manny Marroquin – mixing

== Charts ==
=== Weekly charts ===
Chart (1999)	Peak position
US Billboard 200	77
US Top R&B/Hip-Hop Albums (Billboard)	15

=== Year-end charts ===
Chart (2000)	Position
US Top R&B/Hip-Hop Albums (Billboard)	82
