= Reflections (After 7 album) =

Studio album by After 7
- Released: July 18, 1995
- Recorded: 1994–1995
- Genre: R&B
- Label: Virgin Records
- Producer: Babyface, Jon B., The Boom Brothers, Keith Andes

After 7 chronology
| Takin' My Time (1992) | Reflections (1995) | The Very Best of After 7 (1997) |

Singles from Reflections
- 1. "'Til You Do Me Right" Released: June 20, 1995

Professional ratings
Review scores
| Source | Rating |
|---|---|
| Allmusic | 3/5 stars |

Reflections is the third and final studio album by After 7 before the group split in 1997. The album reunites them with producer Babyface, who along with his then partner L.A. Reid, wrote and produced the majority of their self-titled debut. They also enlist the production talents of Babyface proteges Jon B and Keith Andes as well as newcomers The Boom Brothers. Reflections is the first album where the members of the group have credits as songwriters as well as executive producers. The music video for the first single "'Til You Do Me Right" was directed by photographer Randee St. Nicholas. Reflections peaked at #40 on the Billboard 200 and was certified gold by the RIAA on November 16, 1995.

== Track listing ==
1. "'Til You Do Me Right" (Babyface, Kevon Edmonds, Melvin Edmonds) (4:55)
2. "Cryin' for It" (Babyface) (5:02)
3. "Save It Up" (Jon B.) (4:09)
4. "Damn Thing Called Love" (Jon B.) (5:30)
5. "How Did He Love You" (Jon B.) (5:17)
6. "What U R 2 Me" (Jon B.) (4:38)
7. "How Do You Tell the One" (Babyface) (4:47)
8. "Sprung On It" (Tony Boom, Chuck Boom) (4:06)
9. "How Could You Leave" (Keith Andes, Ricky Jones) (5:01)
10. "Givin Up This Good Thing" (Keith Andes, Ricky Jones) (4:49)
11. "I Like It Like That" (Keith Andes, Melvin Edmonds, Kevon Edmonds) (4:24)
12. "Honey (Oh How I Need You)" (Keith Andes, Ricky Jones, Warres Casey) (3:39)

== Personnel ==
- Keyboards: Babyface, Jon B., Keith Andes, The Boom Brothers
- Drum Programming: Babyface, Jon B., Keith Andes, The Boom Brothers
- Bass: Reggie Hamilton on "'Til You Do Me Right" and "How Do You Tell The One", Babyface on "Cryin' for It"
- Midi Programming: Randy Walker, Keith Andes, The Boom Brothers
- Guest vocals: Babyface on "Honey (Oh How I Need You)"
- Background vocals: After 7, Jon B. on "Save It Up", Babyface on "What U R 2 Me", The Boom Brothers on "Sprung On It"
- Saxophone: Everette Harp on "What U R 2 Me"

== Charts ==
| Chart (1995) | Peak position |
|---|---|
| US Billboard 200 | 40 |
| US Top R&B/Hip-Hop Albums (Billboard) | 7 |

== Certifications ==
| Region | Certification | Certified units/sales |
|---|---|---|
| United States (RIAA) | Gold | 500,000^{^} |
^{^} Shipments figures based on certification alone.
