= Wataz =

American hip hop group

- Origin: Brooklyn, New York, U.S.
- Genres: Hip hop
- Years active: 1997–1998
- Label: Fully Loaded
- Members: Taz; Waterbug

The Wataz were an American hip hop group composed of Ketrina "Taz" Askew and Chris "Waterbug" Stokes. Stokes who had gained fame as a producer for acts such as Immature and Smooth formed the group in 1997 and signed a deal with independent label, Fully Loaded Records. The group released one album, 1998's Natural High, which peaked at 68 on the Top R&B/Hip-Hop Albums, and had one charting single "Ohh Ahh Ohh", which made it to 81 on the R&B/Hip-Hop charts.

Katrina “Taz” Askew has been referenced to be involved in the mismanagement and alleged sexual abuse of young artists signed to The Ultimate Group (TUG) record label alongside label mate, Chris Stokes. Taz and Stokes allegedly financially exploited boy band, B2K (leading to their break up), blackballing artists such as Monteco and Quindon Tarver, as well as were said to have arranged sex acts towards underage artists in the 90s and early 2000s.

== Discography ==
Year	Title	Chart positions
Year	Title	U.S. R&B
1998	Natural High: Released: February 10, 1998; Label: Fully Loaded	68
