= 101 (song) =

Single by Sheena Easton

from the album The Lover in Me
- Released: 3 July 1989
- Recorded: 1987–88
- Genre: Synthpop
- Length: 4:07
- Label: MCA
- Songwriter: Joey Coco
- Producer: Prince

Sheena Easton singles chronology
"Days Like This" (1989)	"101" (1989)	"No Deposit, No Return" (1989)

"101" is a song written by American musician Prince (using his pseudonym Joey Coco) for Scottish singer Sheena Easton. The song appeared on Easton's ninth studio album The Lover in Me (1988), and was released in 1989 as the third single from The Lover in Me album. Though he used the name "Joey Coco" for the writing credit, Prince was credited as the producer using his real (first) name.

== Charts ==
=== Weekly charts ===
Chart (1989)	Peak position
UK Singles (Official Charts Company)	54
US Dance Club Songs (Billboard)	2
US Dance/Electronic Singles Sales (Billboard)	25
