= No Sound But a Heart =

Studio album by Sheena Easton
- Released: 17 July 1987
- Recorded: 1986–1987
- Studios: Sunset Sound (Hollywood, California); Tarpan Studios (San Rafael, California); Soundcastle (Santa Monica, California); Unique Recording Studios, The Hit Factory, Soundtrack Studios and Sigma Sound Studios (New York City, New York); Sigma Sound Studios (Philadelphia, Pennsylvania); Sarm Studios (London, UK)
- Genre: Adult contemporary
- Length: 41:35 (Standard); 1:00:09 (Reissue)
- Label: EMI
- Producers: Keith Diamond; Narada Michael Walden; Nick Martinelli; David Leonard; Phil Ramone

Sheena Easton chronology
Do You (1985)	No Sound But a Heart (1987)	The Lover in Me (1988)

No Sound But a Heart is the eighth studio album by the Scottish singer Sheena Easton, released in 1987 on the EMI America label. The album was issued exclusively in the Canadian, Mexican and Asian markets, and consists of midtempo and ballad songs, including the single and video, "Eternity", written by Prince. The disc features Steve Perry from Journey on backing vocals on "Still in Love" and a duet with Eugene Wilde on "What If We Fall in Love".

== Background ==
The release of No Sound But a Heart was hampered in the United States after EMI America was absorbed into EMI Manhattan Records and two scheduled release dates for the album (February and June 1987) were not met. The album was reissued in 1999 by the One Way Records label, marking the first time it had been officially available in the United States. The 1999 reissue added several bonus tracks including "Shockwave" a non album B-side to "Eternity" and Easton's contributions to the soundtrack of the 1986 film About Last Night..., "Natural Love" and the Top 50 single "So Far, So Good".

This was Easton's final release on the EMI label. She moved to MCA Records the following year. On July 12, 2019, RT Industries digitally released No Sound But a Heart.

== Reviews ==
From a 1987 review in Rolling Stone magazine: "No Sound But a Heart is an interesting compromise. It keeps the emphasis on soul balladry, but backs its songs with solid R&B grooves."

== Track listing ==
1. "Eternity" (Prince) – 4:17
2. "Still Willing to Try" (Keith Diamond) – 4:06
3. "Still in Love" (Jeffrey Cohen, Narada Michael Walden); featuring Steve Perry – 4:33
4. "Wanna Give My Love" (Dana Merino) – 3:55
5. "The Last to Know" (Phil Galdston, Brock Walsh) – 5:19
6. "No Sound But a Heart" (John Bettis, Patrick Leonard) – 4:19
7. "What If We Fall in Love" (Jon Buckingham); featuring Eugene Wilde – 4:09
8. "No Ordinary Love" (Keith Diamond, James Ingram) – 4:42
9. "Floating Hearts" (Jeffrey Cohen, Narada Michael Walden, Corrado Rustici) – 6:32

1999 reissue bonus tracks

10. "Shockwave" B-side of "Eternity" (Sheena Easton, Jesse Johnson, Narada Michael Walden) – 5:42
11. "So Far So Good" from the Motion Picture About Last Night (Tom Snow, Cynthia Weil) – 4:04
12. "Natural Love" from the Motion Picture About Last Night (Tom Snow, Cynthia Weil) – 3:50
13. "It's Christmas All Over the World" from the Motion Picture Santa Claus: The Movie – 4:54

== Personnel ==
Musicians and vocalists

- Sheena Easton – lead vocals, backing vocals (2–6, 8)
- Kim Bullard – keyboards (1), synthesizers (1)
- Randy Waldman – keyboards (1), synthesizers (1)
- Prince – Ensoniq Mirage (1), guitars (1), LinnDrum (1)
- Keith Diamond – keyboards (2, 6, 8), bass (2, 8) drums (2, 6, 8), synth bass (6), Fairlight CMI (8)
- Skip Anderson – keyboards (2, 6)
- Walter Afanasieff – keyboards (3, 7, 9), synthesizers (3, 7, 9)
- David Sancious – keyboards (3, 9), synthesizers (3, 9), synth sax solo (9)
- Chuck Kentis – synthesizers (4)
- Arthur Stead – synthesizers (4)
- Randy Cantor – keyboards (5)
- Preston Glass – synthesizers (7), bells (7)
- Jeff Smith – programming (8)
- Ira Siegel – guitars (2)
- Corrado Rustici – Charvel GTM6 MIDI lead guitar synthesizer (3, 7, 9)
- John McCurry – guitars (4)
- Ron Jennings – guitars (5)
- Paul Pesco – guitars (8)
- Randy Jackson – Moog bass (3), bass (3, 7, 9)
- Neil Jason – bass (4)
- Doug Grigsby – bass (5)
- Wayne Brathwaite – bass (6), fretless bass (6)
- Doug Wimbish – bass (8)
- Narada Michael Walden – drums (3, 7), programming (3, 9), LinnDrum (9)
- Gigi Gonaway – Simmons toms (3), cymbals (3)
- Steve Holley – drums (4)
- Jim Salamone – drums (5)
- Jimmy Bralower – percussion (4)
- Bill Hendrickson – cymbals (9)
- Todd Hemmenway – cello (1)
- Kenny G – saxophone solo (3)
- Danny Wilensky – saxophone (8)
- Toots Thielemans – harmonica (5)
- Steve Perry – backing vocals (3)
- Rory Dodd – backing vocals (4)
- Merrick Norman – backing vocals (4)
- Eric Troyer – backing vocals (4)
- Armand Pocaraba – backing vocals (5)
- Eugene Wilde – lead vocals (7)
- Janice Dempsey – backing vocals (8)
- Lisa Fischer – backing vocals (8)
- B.J. Nelson – backing vocals (8)
- Kitty Beethoven – backing vocals (9)
- Jim Gilstrap – backing vocals (9)
- Jennifer Hall – backing vocals (9)
- Alex Ligertwood – backing vocals (9)

Music arrangements

- Randy Peterson – vocal arrangements (1)
- Keith Diamond – arrangements (2, 6, 8)
- Jerry Hey – string arrangements (3, 7)
- Narada Michael Walden – arrangements (3, 7, 9)
- Phil Ramone – arrangements (4)
- Nick Martinelli – arrangements (5)
- Jack Faith – string arrangements (5)

Horns and strings (Tracks 2 & 6)

- Leon Pendarvis – arrangements and conductor
- Doriane Elliot and Vicki Genfan – music contractors

Horn section

- Dave Tofani – alto flute, alto saxophone
- Lawrence Feldman – alto flute, tenor saxophone
- Dean Plank – bass trombone (2)
- Tom Malone – trombone (2)
- Alan Rubin and Lew Soloff – trumpet, flugelhorn
- John Clark and Peter Jon Gordon – French horn (2)

String section

- Jesse Levy, Eugene Moye and Frederick Zlotkin – cello
- Lewis Eley, Richard Henrickson, Regis Iandiorio, Sidney Kaufman, Charles Libove, Matthew Libove, Tony Posk and Gerald Tarack – violin

== Production ==
- David Leonard – producer (1)
- Keith Diamond – producer (2, 6, 8)
- Narada Michael Walden – producer (3, 7, 9–11)
- Phil Ramone – producer (4)
- Nick Martinelli – producer (5)
- Dennis Lambert – producer (12)
- Keith Olsen – producer (13)
- Lorraine Rebidas – production coordinator (1)
- Joseph D'Ambrosio – production coordinator (4)
- Henry Marquez – art direction
- Tommy Steele – design
- Marco Franciosa – photography
- Herb Ritts – photography
- Mandy Jackson – stylist
- Francesca Tolot – make-up
- Barron Matalon – hair
- Harriet Wasserman – management

Technical

- Wally Traugott – mastering at Capitol Records (Hollywood, California)
- David Leonard – engineer (1), mixing (1)
- Bob Rosa – engineer (2, 6, 8)
- J.C. Convertino – horn and string engineer (2, 6)
- David Frazer – recording (3, 7, 9), mixing (3, 7, 9)
- Jim Boyer – engineer (4)
- Gene Leone – engineer (5)
- Scott MacMillan – engineer (5)
- Michael Tarsia – engineer (5), mix engineer (5)
- Julian Mendelsohn – remixing (5)
- Matthew Kasher – engineer (8)
- David Knight – assistant engineer (1)
- Bino Espinoza – assistant mix engineer (1)
- Ed Bruder – assistant engineer (2, 6, 8)
- Tony Masciaratte – assistant horn and string engineer (2, 6)
- Dana Jon Chappelle – recording assistant (3, 7, 9), mix assistant (3, 7, 9)
- Tim Leitner – assistant engineer (4)
- Randy Abrams – assistant engineer (5)
- Adam Silverman – assistant engineer (5)
- Bob Brockmann – assistant engineer (8)
- Mark Partis – assistant engineer (8)
- Angela Piva – assistant engineer (8)
- Roey Shamir – assistant engineer (8)
- Tom Vercillo – assistant engineer (8)

== Charts ==
Chart performance for No Sound But a Heart
Chart (1987)	Peak position
Japanese Albums (Oricon)	59

== Sources ==
- No Sound But a Heart at AllMusic
