= No Love (I'm Not Used to) =

"No Love (I'm Not Used To)"

Single by Kevon Edmonds

from the album 24/7
- Released: October 12, 1999
- Length: 5:10
- Label: RCA
- Songwriter(s): Daryl Simmons

Kevon Edmonds singles chronology
"24/7" (1999)	"No Love (I'm Not Used To)" (1999)	"Love Will Be Waiting" (2000)

Music video
- "No Love (I'm Not Used To)" on YouTube

"No Love (I'm Not Used to)" is a song performed by Kevon Edmonds, issued as a radio-only single from his debut solo album 24/7. Released in 1999, the song peaked at #25 on the Billboard R&B chart in 2000.

== Chart positions ==
=== Weekly charts ===
Chart (2000)	Peak position
US Hot R&B/Hip-Hop Singles & Tracks (Billboard)	25

=== Year-end charts ===
Chart (2000)	Position
US Hot R&B/Hip-Hop Singles & Tracks (Billboard)	100
