= Bloodstone (Bloodstone album) =

Studio album by Bloodstone
- Released: 1972
- Recorded: 1972
- Studio: Command Studios
- Genre: Soul; Funk
- Length: 32:28
- Label: Decca
- Producer: George Braunstein; Ron Hamad; Bloodstone

Bloodstone chronology
Bloodstone (1972)	Natural High (1973)

Bloodstone is the debut album by soul group Bloodstone. It was released in Europe but not in the United States. The last four tracks, however, appear as bonus tracks on the CD version of their later LP Unreal.

Professional ratings
Review scores
Source	Rating
Allmusic	3/5 stars

== Track listing ==
All tracks are written by Eddie Summers, except where noted.

No.	Title	Writer(s)	Length
1.	"Sadie Mae"		3:03
2.	"Take These Chains"		2:56
3.	"You Don't Mean Nothin'"	Charles E. McCormick	3:37
4.	"Little Green Apples"	Bobby Russell	9:02
5.	"This Thing Is Heavy"	McCormick	3:05
6.	"Friendship"		3:09
7.	"Lady of the Night"		3:05
8.	"Dumb Dude"	Charles Love	4:31

== Personnel ==
Bloodstone

- Willis Draffen Jr. – Guitar
- Roger Durham – Vocals, Percussion
- Charles Love – Vocals
- Charles E. McCormick – Bass
- Eddie Summers – Drums
- Harry Williams – Vocals, Percussion

Additional

- David Anstey – Artwork
- Doc Siegel – Engineer
- George Braunstein – Producer
- Ron Hamady – Producer
- Guy Cross – Photography
- Eddie Summers – Music Director
