= Natural High (Wataz album) =

Studio album by Wataz
- Released: February 10, 1998
- Recorded: 1997
- Genre: Hip hop
- Length: 48:56
- Label: Fully Loaded
- Producer: Chris Stokes

Professional ratings
Review scores
Source	Rating
Allmusic	4/5 stars

Natural High is the first and only album by the Wataz. It was released on February 10, 1998 through Fully Loaded Records and was mostly produced by member, Chris "Waterbug" Stokes.

Though the album did not have much promotion, it did manage it make it to 68 on the Top R&B/Hip-Hop Albums, and spawned one charting single, "Ohh Ahh Ohh", which made it to the Hot R&B/Hip-Hop Singles & Tracks.

== Track listing ==
1. "Ohh Ahh Ohh"- 3:52
2. "Spend the Night"- 4:24 (Featuring Smooth)
3. "Feeling Kinda High"- 3:54
4. "Let's Bounce"- 4:13
5. "Let's Stay Together"- 4:10 (Featuring MQ3, Kball, Immature, Gyrl and Smooth)
6. "It's a Shame"- 4:09
7. "Why"- 4:07
8. "Sunny Dayz"- 4:08
9. "Me & Mr. Feelgood"- 4:04
10. "Taste My Juice"- 3:46
11. "Good Morning"- 4:25
12. "Sex on the Beach"- 3:44

== Chart history ==
Chart (1998)	Peak position
Billboard Top R&B/Hip-Hop Albums	68
