= Kevon Edmonds =

American contemporary R&B singer (born 1957)

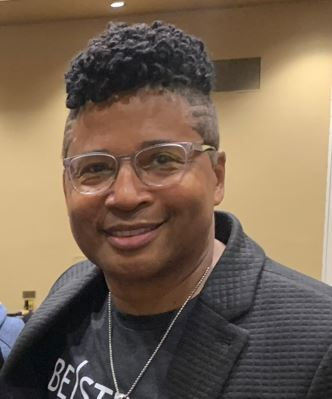
- Edmonds in 2022

Background information
- Born: Kevon Bernard Edmonds; February 25, 1958 (age 68); Indianapolis, Indiana, U.S.
- Genre: R&B
- Occupations: Singer, songwriter
- Years active: 1987–present
- Labels: Virgin, RCA
- Member of: After 7
- Formerly of: Milestone

Kevon Bernard Edmonds (born February 25, 1958) is an American singer. He is member of the R&B group After 7 and the older brother of Kenneth "Babyface" Edmonds. The group released three moderately successful albums for Virgin Records and became best known for their 1990 singles "Ready or Not" and "Can't Stop." Edmonds embarked on a solo career with his debut studio album 24/7 (1999); the album's title track was certified gold by the Recording Industry Association of America (RIAA) and reached number ten on the Billboard Hot 100. His follow up single, "No Love (I'm Not Used to)" was a moderate R&B hit. Edmonds was also a member of the quintet Milestone along with his brothers Babyface and Melvin, as well as K-Ci & JoJo. The group released one single, "I Care 'Bout You" for the soundtrack to the 1997 film Soul Food.

== Biography ==
Edmonds was born in Indianapolis in 1957 to Marvin Edmonds Sr. and Barbara Edmonds. He is the fourth born of six sons. He had three older brothers Marvin Jr., Melvin and Michael and two younger brothers Kenny "Babyface" and Derek. Edmonds graduated from North Central High School and Indiana University Bloomington. At Indiana University he was a member of the Soul Revue, where he met his future After 7 groupmate Keith Mitchell.

Kevon and Keith decided to form a group as a hobby and add Kevon's brother Melvin. For years after college Edmonds worked at Eli Lilly and Company, but he would come together with Keith and Melvin to perform locally. By the late 1980s, Edmonds' younger brother Babyface had built a successful career singing, writing and producing. He invited Melvin, Kevon and Keith out to Los Angeles, named them After 7, and got them a record deal with Virgin Records.

=== After 7 and Milestone ===
As a member of After 7, Edmonds had successes earning platinum albums as well as several gold singles. They continued to tour the country and established themselves as one of R&B's top-performing groups. After their 1995 album, Reflections, After 7 left Virgin Records due to issues with the label. The departure from Virgin Records allowed the members to pursue their own personal projects and over time, saw the group separate.

Edmonds then appeared with Babyface and K-Ci & JoJo for a project in a fictional group called Milestone. The group performed in the movie Soul Food and had a hit single with the track "I Care About You". For a brief period, Milestone nearly became a real group, instead of just the fictional group portrayed in the movie, but label conflicts caused the project to collapse.

After his first solo album Edmonds invited his nephew Jason Edmonds, son of Melvin, to tour with him as a background singer for years. By the late 2000s, After 7 resumed touring with Jason replacing his father. However, the group decided not to record again without the participation of Melvin. Melvin was able to reunite with the group on the 2015 single "I Want You", and a full comeback album Timeless was released in October 2016.

=== Solo career ===
In 1999, Edmonds released his first solo album, 24/7. The title track from the album was a big hit, going gold and reaching No. 10 on the Hot 100. The album's second single, "No Love (I'm Not Used to)", performed moderately well, reaching No. 25 on the R&B charts.

Edmonds' second solo CD, Who Knew, was released on October 13, 2009, through Make Entertainment/Image Distribution. The first single was released in early August and is titled "Oh."

== Discography ==
=== Albums ===
- 24/7 (1999)
- Who Knew (2009)

=== Additional Vocals ===
- On Our Own (1989)
