= Give Me Your Heart (Bloodstone song) =

Song by Bloodstone (band)

from the album Do You Wanna Do A Thing
- Released: October 1975 (US), November 1975 (UK)
- Genre: soul
- Label: London (US), Decca (UK)
- Songwriter(s): Charles McCormick
- Producer(s): Mike Vernon, Pip Williams

"Give Me Your Heart" was a 1975 single by Bloodstone, from their LP, "Do You Wanna Do A Thing". The track made the R&B Top 20. The single was the last track released from their time recording with producer Mike Vernon, which started three years earlier. The song was written by Charles McCormick. The B-side "Something's Missing" was written by Charles Love.

== Chart performance ==
Chart (1975)	Peak position
US Billboard Hot Soul Singles	18
