= Natural High (HammerFall song) =

Single by HammerFall

from the album Threshold
- Released: 22 September 2006
- Recorded: May–July 2006, Lundgärd Studios, Denmark; Track4: 17 May 2003, Olympia, São Paulo, Brazil
- Genre: Power metal, heavy metal
- Length: 18:46
- Label: Nuclear Blast
- Songwriter(s): Oscar Dronjak; Joacim Cans; Stefan Elmgren
- Producer(s): Charlie Bauerfeind

HammerFall singles chronology
| "Blood Bound" (2005) | "Natural High" (2006) | "Any Means Necessary" (2009) |

"Natural High" is a song by Swedish power metal band HammerFall, released on September 22, 2006. It was the second single released from their album Threshold.

The first single from this album "The Fire Burns Forever" only had one track which bears the same name as the single. Cover artwork made by Samwise Didier and layout by Thomas Everhardt.

== Track listing ==
| No. | Title | Writer(s) | Length |
|---|---|---|---|
| 1. | "Natural High" | Dronjak, Cans | 4:14 |
| 2. | "Natural High" (karaoke version) | Dronjak, Cans | 4:15 |
| 3. | "The Fire Burns Forever" (feat. Robert Kronberg) | Dronjak, Cans | 3:20 |
| 4. | "Raise the Hammer" (live) | Dronjak, Elmgren | 3:37 |
| 5. | "The Fire Burns Forever" (video) | Dronjak, Cans | 3:20 |
| Total length: | | | 18:46 |

== Personnel ==
- Joacim Cans - lead & backing vocals
- Oscar Dronjak - lead & rhythm guitars, backing vocals
- Stefan Elmgren - lead & rhythm guitars, backing vocals
- Magnus Rosén - bass guitar
- Anders Johansson - drums

== Additional personnel ==
- Additional lead vocals on "The Fire Burns Forever" by Robert Kronberg.

Backing vocals by:

- Oliver Hartmann
- Rolf Köhler
- Olaf Zenkbiel
- Robert Kronberg
- Mats Rendlert
- Joacim Lundberg
- Markus Sköld
- Johan Aremyr

== Chart positions ==
| Country | Position |
|---|---|
| Switzerland | 83 |
| Germany | 79 |
| Austria | 71 |
| Sweden | 6 |

== Release information ==
Formats: cds, Digipack CD-S, 10″ Vinyl

- DVDr, Single, Promo with one track on it "Natural High".
- 10" Vinyl with four tracks: A1 Natural High; A2 Natural High (Karaoke Version); B1 The Fire Burns Forever; B2 Raise The Hammer (live).
