= Ready or Not (After 7 song) =

Single by After 7

from the album After 7
- Released: August 20, 1989
- Recorded: 1989
- Genre: R&B
- Length: 4:34 (album version); 3:58 (radio edit)
- Label: Virgin
- Songwriters: L.A. Reid, Babyface
- Producers: L.A. Reid, Babyface

After 7 singles chronology
"Don't Cha' Think" (1989)	"Ready or Not" (1989)	"Can't Stop" (1990)

"Ready or Not" is a song performed by American group After 7, issued as the third single from the group's eponymous debut album (1989). In 1990, the song became the first #1 US Billboard R&B single for the group. It was also the group's first top ten pop single, peaking at #7 on the Billboard Hot 100. "Ready or Not" was certified Gold by the RIAA on August 14, 1990.

== Charts ==
=== Weekly charts ===
Chart (1990)	Peak position
US Adult Contemporary (Billboard)	7
US Billboard Hot 100	7
US Hot R&B/Hip-Hop Singles & Tracks (Billboard)	1
US Cash Box Top 100	4

=== Year-end charts ===
Chart (1990)	Position
US Billboard Hot 100	54
US Hot R&B/Hip-Hop Singles & Tracks (Billboard)	9
US Cash Box Top 100	41

== Certifications ==
Region	Certification	Certified units/sales
United States (RIAA)	Gold	500,000^{^}
^{^} Shipments figures based on certification alone.

== Samples ==
- R&B singer Jazmine Sullivan's song "Let It Burn" heavily resembles the rhythm of this song since her single employs the sample
- San Francisco-based lo-fi and vaporwave producer RITCHRD sampled "Ready or Not" on their song "PARIS".

== See also ==
- List of number-one R&B singles of 1990 (U.S.)
