= Bloodstone (band) =

American soul musical group

- Bloodstone, c. 1973. Counterclockwise from top left: Charles McCormick, Willis Draffen, Harry Williams, Charles Love, and Roger Durham.

Background information
- Origin: Kansas City, Missouri, United States
- Genres: R&B, soul, funk, disco
- Years active: 1962–present
- Labels: Decca, London, Motown, T-Neck/CBS
- Members: Donald Brown
- Past members: Charles McCormick; Charles Love; Willis Draffen; Harry Williams; Roger Durham; Melvin Webb; Eddie Summers; Steve Ferrone; Ron Wilson; Ronald D. Bell

Bloodstone is an American R&B, soul and funk group, most popular in the 1970s and early 1980s. The band charted thirteen songs between 1973 and 1984.

== Biography ==
Formed in 1962, in Kansas City, Missouri, the group was a high school doo-wop group called the Sinceres. In 1967 the band was backed by and toured with a large Kansas City horn band known as the Smokin' Emeralds and performed its version of a Motown-style revue, which drew large crowds at a venue called the Place in the Westport district of Kansas City. By 1971, the band consisted of Melvin Webb on drums, Roger Durham (February 14, 1946 – July 27, 1973) on percussion, Charles Love on guitar and vocals (born Charles D. Love Jr., April 18, 1945, Salina, Kansas – March 6, 2014, Kansas City, Missouri), Charles McCormick (May 8, 1946 – April 12, 2022) on bass, Harry Williams (June 19, 1944 – November 22, 2024) on percussion, and Willis Draffen (March 18, 1945 – February 8, 2002) on guitar.

After learning to play their respective musical instruments, they moved to Los Angeles, California, where they met their prospective managers George Braunstein and Ron Hamady. The band also replaced its drummer Melvin Webb with Eddie Summers, a resident of Los Angeles. The managers decided to change their name from the Sinceres to Bloodstone. Later the group traveled to London, England where they signed a recording contract with Decca Records. The original members were Charles McCormick, Willis Draffen Jr., Charles Love, Harry Williams, Roger Durham and Eddie Summers. The first album was titled Bloodstone, whereas there were two singles released simultaneously called "That's the Way We Make Our Music", and "Girl (You Look So Fine)", written and arranged by Eddie Summers, the newest member. Its second album, Natural High, reached the US R&B Top 10. The album was written by various members of the group Bloodstone, with the single "Natural High" reaching number 10 on the Pop chart. It received blanket airplay in Europe, particularly on Radio Luxembourg. It reached number 40 on the UK chart in August 1973 and was featured in the Decca "World of Hits" series of compilation albums.

Bloodstone's other hits include "Never Let You Go", "Outside Woman" and "My Little Lady". Bloodstone was instrumental in the "black rock" and funk movement of the 1970s, and even had a hand in the brown-eyed soul movement with some Latin music-tinged hits. Bloodstone performed with Marvin Gaye, Curtis Mayfield, Elton John, and The Impressions. Their 1973 album Natural High, produced by Mike Vernon, sold over one million copies, and was awarded a gold disc by the R.I.A.A. in July that year.

Bloodstone also starred in and wrote and performed six original songs and performed five pop, rock and roll and R&B covers for Train Ride to Hollywood, a 1975 film. The movie had a plot recalling the Beatles' Help!, in which Bloodstone played themselves in a madcap adventure on a train bound for Los Angeles with movie stars and characters from the 1930s and 1940s as their traveling companions.

They achieved a moderate comeback in the early 1980s with McCormick replacement Ron Wilson. Their album We Go a Long Way Back (1982), whose title track reached the R&B chart Top 5, also produced a follow-up single "Go On and Cry" that reached number 18. The group continued to record into the mid-1980s. They later continued to tour and perform with original members Charles McCormick, Harry Williams and newer member Donald Brown.

Roger Durham died on July 27, 1973, at the age of 27 of kidney failure and liver complications. Founding member Melvin Webb died in 1982. Willis Draffen died on February 8, 2002, at the age of 56. Charles Love died on March 6, 2014, at the age of 68. Love died from complications of pneumonia and had been battling emphysema for several years. Charles McCormick died on April 12, 2022, at the age of 75. When McCormick died, Harry Williams became the only surviving member of the original lineup still in the group, but he continued to perform with Donald Brown, who had replaced Draffen in 2002. Charles McCaleb, replaced McCormick after his death in 2022, and is no longer with the group as of December 2024. Kevin Owens and Larry Winfree, both formerly of Ray, Goodman and Brown, joined Brown in what is now known as 'Bloodstone's Legacy.'

Summers died from colon cancer on April 5, 2022, at the age of 74. Williams died on November 22, 2024, at the age of 80.

In 2019, Bloodstone was honored with a Lifetime Achievement Award by the National R&B Music Society in Philadelphia.

== Members ==
Current members

- Donald Brown – vocals, guitar (2002–present)

Former members

- Harry Williams – vocals (1962–2024; died 2024)
- Charles McCormick – bass, vocals (1962–1982, 1984–2022; died 2022)
- Charles Love – vocals, guitar (1962–2014; died 2014)
- Willis Draffen – vocals, guitar (1962–2002; died 2002)
- Roger Durham – percussion (1962–1973; died 1973)
- Melvin Webb – drums (1962–1971; died 1982)
- Eddie Summers – vocals, drums, keyboards, music director (1971–1975; died 2022)
- Steve Ferrone – drums (1975)
- Ron Wilson – bass, vocals (1982–1984)
- Ronald D. Bell – drums (1982; died 2020)
- Charles McCaleb – vocals (2022–2024)

== Discography ==
=== Albums ===
| Year | Album | Peak chart positions | |
| Year | Album | US | US R&B |
|---|---|---|---|
| 1972 | Bloodstone | — | — |
| 1973 | Natural High | 30 | 2 |
| 1973 | Unreal | 110 | 6 |
| 1974 | I Need Time | 141 | 13 |
| 1974 | Riddle of the Sphinx | 147 | 22 |
| 1975 | Train Ride to Hollywood | — | — |
| 1976 | Do You Wanna Do a Thing | — | 51 |
| 1976 | Lullaby of Broadway | — | — |
| 1978 | Don't Stop | — | — |
| 1982 | We Go a Long Way Back | 95 | 11 |
| 1984 | Party | — | — |
| 1985 | Bloodstone’s Greatest Hits | — | — |
| 1999 | Go on and Cry | — | — |
| 2004 | Now! That's What I'm Talkin' About | — | — |
"—" denotes releases that did not chart.

=== Singles ===
| Year | Single | Chart positions | | | | |
| Year | Single | US Pop | US R&B | CAN | CAN AC | UK |
|---|---|---|---|---|---|---|
| 1973 | "Natural High" | 10 | 4 | 19 | 52 | 40 |
| 1973 | "Never Let You Go" | 43 | 7 | — | — | — |
| 1974 | "Outside Woman" | 34 | 2 | 35 | — | — |
| 1974 | "That's Not How It Goes" | 82 | 22 | 45 | — | — |
| 1975 | "My Little Lady" | 57 | 4 | 49 | — | — |
| 1975 | "Give Me Your Heart" | — | 18 | — | — | — |
| 1976 | "Do You Wanna Do a Thing" | 101 | 19 | — | — | — |
| 1976 | "Just Like in the Movies" | — | 58 | — | — | — |
| 1979 | "Just Want the Feel of It" | — | — | — | — | — |
| 1982 | "We Go a Long Way Back" | — | 5 | — | — | — |
| 1982 | "Go on and Cry" | — | 18 | — | — | — |
| 1982 | "My Love Grows Stronger (Part 1)" | — | 44 | — | — | — |
| 1984 | "Instant Love" | — | 42 | — | — | — |
| 1984 | "Bloodstone's Party" | — | 69 | — | — | — |
"—" denotes releases that did not chart or were not released.
