= The Lover in Me (album) =

Studio album by Sheena Easton
- Released: November 1988 (US); February 1989 (UK)
- Recorded: 1987–1988
- Studio: Galaxy Sound Studios, Sunset Sound, Summa Music Group and The Grey Room (Hollywood, California); Larrabee Sound Studios West (West Hollywood, California); Elumba Studios, Silverlake Studios and Westlake Studios (Los Angeles, California); Can-Am Recorders (Tarzana, California); Sigma Sound Studios (New York City, New York); Paisley Park Studios (Chanhassen, Minnesota)
- Genre: R&B; funk; soul; new jack swing
- Length: 49:43
- Label: MCA
- Producer: Babyface; Kayo; L.A. Reid; Prince; Angela L. Winbush; John Jellybean Benitez

Sheena Easton chronology
No Sound But a Heart (1987)	The Lover in Me (1988)	What Comes Naturally (1991)

The Lover in Me is the ninth studio album by the Scottish singer Sheena Easton. It was released in November 1988, was her debut for MCA and spawned five singles – the title track, "Days Like This", "101", "No Deposit, No Return" and "Follow My Rainbow". In 2006, Cherry Red Records (UK) re-released The Lover in Me, (Expanded Edition) remastered and with added bonus tracks. On May 27, 2016, the album was officially released in the US for digital download on iTunes.

== Background ==
The album has a more Urban/R&B sound than Easton's previous recordings due to the production by well-known acts such as L.A. Reid, Babyface and John "Jellybean" Benitez. The album's title track became a major hit, reaching number 2 on the US Billboard Hot 100 and number 15 on the UK Singles Chart. The album reached number 44 on the US Billboard 200 and number 30 on the UK Albums Chart, and was certified Gold by the RIAA. It is one of Easton's best selling albums to date and returned her to the US and UK charts. Significantly, in the UK it was her first charting album for over five years, with the lead single becoming her first top 20 hit in nearly eight years.

== Promotion ==
The album's title track was the first single from the album to be released, reaching number 2 on the US Billboard Hot 100, number 5 on Billboard's Hot Black Singles chart, and number 15 on the UK Singles Chart. Other singles from the album include "Days Like This" (No. 35 on the US R&B chart, UK No. 43) and "101" (UK No. 54, US Dance No. 2). "101" was written for Easton by Prince under the pseudonym Joey Coco (as was album track "(Cool Love"). One last single was released in the US; "No Deposit, No Return", but failed to chart.

"Follow My Rainbow" made number 14 on the Dutch Single Top 100 and the top 40 in the Flanders region of Belgium. It is featured in an episode ("Deliver Us from Evil") of Miami Vice in which Easton's character (Caitlin Davies-Crockett) is singing the song minutes before her character is eliminated.

== Critical reception ==
Professional ratings
Review scores
Source	Rating
AllMusic	2/5 stars
Number One	4/5 stars

Billboard magazine, December 1988: "The Lover in Me" shows Sheena Easton taking her career in a new direction. With production by L.A. & Babyface, Angela Winbush, Jellybean Benitez, and Prince, the album is smart, sexy, and soulful.

People magazine, December 5, 1988: Anyone who likes to see Maseratis used to plow snow or filet mignon ground into hamburger may like this record, in which Easton does a convincing imitation of a fourth-rate R&B singer. Maybe she got turned around by her collaboration with Prince, in which—during the U Got the Look video—she groveled around in a fashion that would have been humiliating to the most desperate starlet, let alone to a singer of Easton's stature and talent. Prince produced two of this album's 10 tracks (with little of the distinction he often shows on his own records), and the rest were done by such dance poppers as Babyface and Jellybean Benitez. Easton just blares away, fighting a losing battle against the rhythm backgrounds on the hotter tracks and sounding nondescript on the ballads, except Without You, where she sounds so much like Streisand it seems an outright imitation. That just accentuates the revolting developments of Easton's recent career.

Rolling Stone magazine, 1989: "The Lover In Me" (MCA) by Sheena Easton has got to be one of the most satisfying comeback albums this year. A new label and a clearer musical vision stretches Easton's vocal gifts considerably. Adopting a genuine R&B dance mode, the album's material overall is quite strong and is destined to garner Easton many new fans. Of the L.A. & Babyface productions on the album, the hit title track, "Days Like This" and "No Deposit, No Return" are the standouts featuring the production duo's customary style. One of our favorites is the Angela Winbush penned and produced "Fire and Rain," a sultry, soulful and very Isley-ish slow number that we hope clicks at radio.

== Track listing ==
Side one

1. "No Deposit, No Return" (Babyface, Kayo, L.A. Reid, Daryl Simmons) – 5:55
2. "The Lover in Me" (Babyface, Reid, Simmons) – 5:02
3. "Follow My Rainbow" (Babyface) – 4:55
4. "Without You" (Angela Winbush) – 5:37
5. "If It's Meant to Last" (Danny Sembello, Allee Willis) – 4:07

Side two

1. "Days Like This" (Babyface, Reid, Simmons) – 5:07
2. "One Love" (Babyface, Reid) – 4:54
3. "101" (Joey Coco) – 4:06
4. "Cool Love" (Coco) – 4:03
5. "Fire and Rain" (Winbush) – 5:56

2006 re-release bonus tracks

1. "The Lover in Me" (extended dub version)
2. "Days Like This" (7" version)
3. "101" (The Remix)
4. "No Deposit, No Return" (radio edit)

== Personnel ==
- Sheena Easton – lead vocals, backing vocals (1–3, 6, 7, 10)
- Babyface – keyboards (1–3, 6, 7), backing vocals (1, 3)
- Kayo – keyboards (1–3, 6, 7), bass (3)
- Angela Winbush – keyboards (4), percussion (4), acoustic piano (10), synthesizers (5), drum programming (10), backing vocals (10)
- Jeff Lorber – keyboard sequencing (4), additional synthesizers (4), synth solo (4), synth bass (4), percussion (4), synthesizers (10), additional drum programming (10)
- David LeBolt – synthesizers (5)
- Ed Terry – synthesizers (5)
- Prince (credited as Joey Coco) – all instruments (8, 9)
- Ray Griffin – synthesizers (10), toms (10)
- Danny Jacob – guitars (4)
- Tony Maiden – guitars (4, 10)
- Felicia Collins – guitars (5)
- L.A. Reid – drums (1–3, 6, 7), percussion (1–3, 6, 7)
- John Robinson – drums (4)
- Jellybean Benitez – drums (5)
- Larry Williams – saxophone solo (2)
- Karyn White – backing vocals (1, 2, 6)
- Daryl Simmons – backing vocals (2), percussion (3)
- Dee Bristol – backing vocals (7)
- The Deele – rap (7)
- Timothy B. Schmit – backing vocals (4)
- Alfa Anderson – backing vocals (5)
- Robin Clark – backing vocals (5)
- Janice Pendarvis – backing vocals (5)

== Production ==
- Babyface – producer (1–3, 6, 7), arrangements (1–3, 6, 7)
- L.A. Reid – producer (1–3, 6, 7), arrangements (1–3, 6, 7)
- Kayo – co-producer (1)
- Angela Winbush – producer (4, 10), arrangements (4, 10)
- Jellybean Benitez – producer (5), arrangements (5)
- Prince – producer (8, 9), arrangements (8, 9)
- David Leonard – co-producer (9)
- Randy Peterson – vocal arrangements (9)
- Mary House – production assistant (4, 10)
- Doreen Dorion-Reed – production coordinator (5)
- Jeff Adamoff – art direction
- Michael Diehl – design
- Randee St. Nicholas – photography
- Elizabeth Keiselbach – stylist
- Francesca Tolot – make-up
- Barron Macalon – hair
- Harriet Wasserman – management for Gold Mountain Management

Technical

- Steve Hall – mastering at Future Disc (Hollywood, California)
- Jon Gass – engineer (1–3, 6, 7), mix engineer (1–3, 6, 7), mixing (4)
- Babyface – mixing (1–3, 6, 7)
- L.A. Reid – mixing (1–3, 6, 7)
- Mitch Gibson – engineer (4)
- Eddie DeLena – engineer (5)
- Dave McNair – engineer (5), mixing (5)
- Jellybean Benitez – mixing (5)
- Susan Rogers – engineer (8)
- David Leonard – mixing (8, 9)
- Eddie Miller – engineer (9)
- Csaba Pectoz – remixing (9)
- Toni Greene – assistant engineer (1–3, 6, 7)
- Fred Howard – assistant engineer (1, 2, 6, 7)
- Don Sullivan – assistant engineer (1, 2, 6, 7)
- Andy Batwinas – assistant mix engineer (1–3, 6, 7)
- Spence Chrislu – assistant engineer (3)
- Jon Guggenheim – assistant engineer (3)
- Dennis Stefani – assistant engineer (4, 10)
- Robin Laine – mix assistant (4, 10)
- Scott Gootman – assistant engineer (5)
- Paul Logus – assistant engineer (5)
- Jeff Poe – assistant engineer (5)
- Coke Johnson – second engineer (8)
- Dan Marnien – assistant mix engineer (8, 9)

== Charts ==
=== Album ===
Chart performance for The Lover in Me
Chart (1988–89)	Peak position
Australian Albums (ARIA)	94
Dutch Albums (Album Top 100)	9
German Albums (Offizielle Top 100)	48
Swedish Albums (Sverigetopplistan)	20
Swiss Albums (Schweizer Hitparade)	19
UK Albums Chart	30
US Billboard 200	44

=== Singles ===
Chart performance for singles from The Lover in Me
Year	Single	Chart	Position
1988	"The Lover in Me"	US Billboard Hot 100	2
1988	"The Lover in Me"	US Hot Dance Music/Maxi-Singles Sales	1
1988	"The Lover in Me"	US Hot Dance Club Play	2
1988	"The Lover in Me"	US Hot Black Singles	5
1989	"The Lover in Me"	UK Singles Chart	15
1989	"Days Like This"	US Hot Black Singles	35
1989	"Days Like This"	UK Singles Chart	43
1989	"101"	US Hot Dance Club Play	2
1989	"101"	US Hot Dance Music/Maxi-Singles Sales	25
1989	"101"	UK Singles Chart	54

== Certifications ==
Certifications for The Lover in Me
Region	Certification	Certified units/sales
United States (RIAA)	Gold	500,000^{^}
^{^} Shipments figures based on certification alone.
