= Can't Stop (After 7 song) =

Single by After 7

from the album After 7
- Released: May 16, 1990
- Recorded: 1989 LP/Remix
- Genre: R&B, new jack swing
- Length: 4:07
- Label: Virgin
- Songwriters: L.A. Reid, Babyface
- Producers: L.A. Reid, Babyface

After 7 singles chronology
"Ready or Not" (1990)	"Can't Stop" (1990)	"My Only Woman" (1990)

"Can't Stop" is a song performed by American group After 7, issued as the fourth single from the group's eponymous debut album (1989). The song is written and produced by L.A. Reid and Babyface, becoming the group's highest-charting single. It peaked at No. 6 on the US Billboard Hot 100 in 1990. The song became the group's second number-one R&B single, and peaked at No. 25 on the dance chart.

"Can't Stop" was certified Gold by the RIAA on February 7, 1991.

== Charts ==
=== Weekly charts ===
Chart (1990)	Peak position
Australia (ARIA)	80
US Billboard Hot 100	6
US Adult Contemporary (Billboard)	23
US Hot Dance Music/Maxi-Singles Sales (Billboard)	13
US Dance Music/Club Play (Billboard)	25
US Hot R&B Singles (Billboard)	1
US Cash Box Top 100	7

=== Year-end charts ===
Chart (1990)	Position
US Billboard Hot 100	60
US Hot R&B Singles (Billboard)	23
US Cash Box Top 100	45

== Certifications ==
Region	Certification	Certified units/sales
United States (RIAA)	Gold	500,000^{^}
^{^} Shipments figures based on certification alone.

== See also ==
- List of Hot R&B Singles number ones of 1990
