= The Lover in Me (song) =

1988 single by Sheena Easton

Single by Sheena Easton

from the album The Lover in Me
- Released: 11 October 1988
- Genre: Dance-pop
- Length: 5:01 (album version); 6:59 (extended version)
- Label: MCA
- Songwriters: Kenneth Edmonds; Antonio Reid; Daryl Simmons
- Producers: L.A. Reid; Babyface

Sheena Easton singles chronology
"Eternity" (1987)	"The Lover in Me" (1988)	"Days Like This" (1989)

Music video
- "The Lover in Me" on YouTube

"The Lover in Me" is a song by Scottish singer Sheena Easton for her ninth studio album of the same name (1988). Released as the album's lead single on 11 October 1988, the song became Easton's first top-20 hit in the United Kingdom after a seven-year hiatus. The song was also Easton's final top-10 single on the US Billboard Hot 100.

"The Lover in Me" was written by Kenneth "Babyface" Edmonds, Antonio "L.A." Reid and Daryl Simmons, and produced by Reid and Babyface, who were at the peak of their success at the time as a songwriting and production team.

== Chart performance ==
"The Lover in Me" reached number two on the US Billboard Hot 100 as well as the Cash Box Top 100 Pop Singles, becoming her biggest hit since "9 to 5 (Morning Train)". It stayed on the chart for 25 weeks. It also hit number two on the Billboard Dance Club Play chart.

== Music video ==
The accompanying music video for "The Lover in Me" was directed by Dominic Sena and features Easton singing and dancing in a nightclub.

== Track listings ==
7-inch single and cassette single

1. "The Lover in Me" – 4:10
2. "The Lover in Me" (instrumental) – 4:10

Standard 12-inch single

A1. "The Lover in Me" (extended version) – 6:59
B1. "The Lover in Me" (radio edit) – 5:20
B2. "The Lover in Me" (instrumental) – 6:59

UK 12-inch and mini-CD single

A1. "The Lover in Me" (extended version) – 6:55
B1. "The Lover in Me" (instrumental) – 6:55
B2. "The Lover in Me" (bassapella) – 5:13

== Charts ==
=== Weekly charts ===
Chart (1988–1989)	Peak position
Australia (ARIA)	91
Belgium (Ultratop 50 Flanders)	17
Canada Top Singles (RPM)	17
Denmark (Hitlisten)	19
Europe (Eurochart Hot 100)	29
Ireland (IRMA)	12
Luxembourg (Radio Luxembourg)	12
Netherlands (Dutch Top 40)	12
Netherlands (Single Top 100)	11
Switzerland (Schweizer Hitparade)	25
UK Singles (Official Charts)	15
US Billboard Hot 100	2
US Adult Contemporary (Billboard)	43
US Dance Club Songs (Billboard)	2
US Dance Singles Sales (Billboard)	1
US Hot R&B/Hip-Hop Songs (Billboard)	5
West Germany (GfK)	26
Zimbabwe (ZIMA)	1

=== Year-end charts ===
Chart (1989)	Position
Netherlands (Single Top 100)	74
US Billboard Hot 100	41
US 12-inch Singles Sales (Billboard)	29
US Dance Club Play (Billboard)	36
US Hot Black Singles (Billboard)	53

== Release history ==
Region	Date	Format(s)	Label(s)	Ref.
United States	11 October 1988	7-inch vinyl; 12-inch vinyl; cassette	MCA	
Japan	28 November 1988	Mini-CD	MCA	
United Kingdom	9 January 1989	7-inch vinyl; 12-inch vinyl; CD	MCA	
