= Heat of the Moment (After 7 song) =

Single by After 7

from the album After 7
- B-side: "Sayonara"
- Released: 1989
- Genre: R&B, new jack swing
- Length: 4:27
- Label: Virgin
- Songwriters: L.A. Reid, Babyface
- Producers: L.A. Reid, Babyface, Daryl Simmons (co.), Kayo (co.)

After 7 singles chronology
"Heat of the Moment" (1989)	"Don't Cha' Think" (1989)

"Heat of the Moment" is a song performed by After 7, issued as the lead single from the group's eponymous debut album in 1989. While reaching number 5 on the Billboard R&B chart, it stalled at number 74 on the Billboard Hot 100. It reentered the Hot 100 in late 1990, peaking at No. 19 on the Billboard Hot 100 in early 1991.

== Charts ==
=== Weekly charts ===
Chart (1989)	Peak position
Australia (ARIA)	107
US Billboard Hot 100	74
US Hot Dance Music/Maxi-Singles Sales (Billboard)	22
US Hot Black Singles (Billboard)	5
US Cash Box Top 100	15

Chart (1991) re-release	Peak position
US Billboard Hot 100	19

=== Year-end charts ===
Chart (1989)	Position
US Hot Black Singles (Billboard)	74
