= Natural High (Bloodstone song) =

1973 song performed by Bloodstone

Single by Bloodstone

from the album Natural High
- B-side: "Peter's Jones" (North America) "This Thing is Heavy" (international)
- Released: 1973
- Recorded: July 1972; The Village Recorder, Los Angeles
- Genre: Soul; funk; pop
- Length: 4:02 single edit. 4:54 album version.
- Label: London (North America); Decca (international)
- Songwriter(s): Charles McCormick
- Producer(s): Mike Vernon

Bloodstone singles chronology
"Natural High" (1973)	"Never Let You Go" (1973)

"Natural High" is a song performed by Bloodstone, released as the first single and title track from their second album. It was written by the band's bassist Charles McCormick, and it was the first song from the band to enter the Billboard Hot 100, peaking at number 10 on 21 July 1973.

The song also reached number 40 on the UK Singles chart, and was featured on the soundtrack of Quentin Tarantino's Blaxploitation crime drama Jackie Brown (1997).

== Chart positions ==
=== Weekly charts ===
Chart (1973)	Peak position
US Billboard Hot 100	10
US R&B Singles (Billboard)	4
Canada (RPM)	19
Canada AC (RPM)	52
UK	40

=== Year-end charts ===
Chart (1973)	Position
U.S. Billboard Hot 100	39

== After 7 version ==
"Baby, I'm for Real/Natural High"

Single by After 7

from the album Takin' My Time
- Released: 1992
- Genre: R&B, slow jam, soul
- Length: 5:08
- Label: Virgin
- Songwriter(s): Charles McCormick
- Producer(s): Daryl Simmons & Kevin Roberson

After 7 singles chronology
"Kickin' It" (1992)	"Baby, I'm for Real/Natural High" (1992)	"Can He Love U Like This" (1993)

In 1992, R&B group After 7 covered the song in a medley alongside the Originals' "Baby, I'm for Real". Released as "Baby, I'm for Real/Natural High", the song peaked at number 55 on the Billboard Hot 100.

=== Chart positions ===
==== Weekly charts ====
Chart (1992)	Peak position
US Billboard Hot 100	55
US Hot R&B/Hip-Hop Singles & Tracks (Billboard)	5
US Rhythmic Top 40 (Billboard)	26

==== Year-end charts ====
Chart (1992)	Position
US Hot R&B/Hip-Hop Singles & Tracks (Billboard)	38
