= Natural High (Bloodstone album) =

Studio album by Bloodstone
- Released: 1973
- Recorded: July 1972
- Studios: The Village Recorder, Los Angeles
- Genres: Soul, funk
- Length: 40:50 original LP
- Label: London
- Producer: Mike Vernon

Bloodstone chronology
Bloodstone (1972)	Natural High (1973)	Unreal (1974)

Singles from Natural High
- 1. "Natural High" Released: April 1973; 2. "Never Let You Go" Released: August 1973; 3. "Outside Woman" Released: January 1974

Professional ratings
Review scores
Source	Rating
AllMusic	3/5 stars
Christgau's Record Guide	C+
The Encyclopedia of Popular Music	3/5 stars
The Rolling Stone Record Guide	4/5 stars

Natural High is the second album by the soul group Bloodstone, released in 1973. It was reissued on CD in 1996 with several bonus tracks.

The album charted at number two on the Soul Album Charts led by the singles "Natural High," which rose to 10 on the soul singles chart and 4 on the pop chart, while "Never Let You Go" reached 43 and 7, respectively.

The title song was used by Quentin Tarantino on the soundtrack to his 1997 movie, Jackie Brown.

== Track listing ==
1. "You Know We've Learned" - (Willis Draffen Jr.) - 4:12
2. "Who Has the Last Laugh Now" - (Charles McCormick) - 5:36
3. "Peter's Jones" - (Larry Durham, Roger Durham) - 4:12
4. "That's the Way We Make Our Music" - (Eddie Summers) - 3:15
5. "Bo Diddley/Diddley Daddy" - (Ellis McDaniel) - 3:37
6. "Natural High" (McCormick) - 4:53
7. "I Need Your Love" - (McCormick) - 1:10
8. "Tell It to My Face" - (Charles Love) - 3:15
9. "Ran It in the Ground" - (Love) - 4:52
10. "Never Let You Go" - (Harry Williams) - 5:37

Bonus tracks on CD reissue:

11. "Girl (You Look So Fine)" - 2:38
12. "Judy, Judy" - 2:44
13. "Sadie Mae" - 3:02
14. "Take These Chains" - 2:55
15. "You Don't Mean Nothin'" - 3:39
16. "Little Green Apples" - 9:14

== Personnel ==
- Charles McCormick – bass, vocals
- Charles Love, Willis Draffen Jr. – guitar, vocals
- Melvin Webb – drums, congas, timbales
- Roger Durham, Harry Williams – percussion, vocals
- Hense Powell – acoustic and electric piano, organ
- Eddie Summers – drums, vibraphone, piano, congas, vocals
- Gordon Dewitte – organ
- Mike Vernon – glockenspiel, castanets, tubular bells
- Richard L. Mackey, Arthur N. Maebe – French horn
- Jacqueline Lustgarten, Raymond L. Kelley – cello
- Gene Cipriano – Cor Anglais
- Dan Neufeld, Nathan Kaproff – viola
- Carla Spencer, Erno Neufeld, Paul C. Shure, Samuel Boghossian – violin
- Pip Williams – arranger, conductor

== Charts ==
Chart (1973)	Peak position
Billboard Pop Albums	30
Billboard Top Soul Albums	2

=== Singles ===
Year	Single	Chart positions	
Year	Single	US Pop	US Soul
1973	"Natural High"	10	4
1973	"Never Let You Go"	43	7
1974	"Outside Woman"	34	2
