= Babyface discography =

The following is the discography of American musician Babyface.

== Albums ==
=== Studio albums ===
List of albums, with selected chart positions and certifications
Title	Album details	Peak chart positions									Certifications
Title	Album details	US	US R&B	AUS	CAN	JPN	NLD	NZ	UK	UK R&B	Certifications
Lovers	Released: October 7, 1986; Label: SOLAR	—	28	—	—	—	—	—	—	—	
Tender Lover	Released: July 7, 1989; Label: SOLAR/Epic	14	1	143	—	—	—	—	—	—	RIAA: 3× Platinum
For the Cool in You	Released: August 24, 1993; Label: Epic	16	2	46	—	—	—	49	—	—	RIAA: 3× Platinum; MC: Gold
The Day	Released: October 29, 1996; Label: Epic	6	4	14	24	17	10	12	34	—	RIAA: 2× Platinum; ARIA: Gold; MC: Platinum; RIAJ: Gold; BPI: Silver
Christmas with Babyface	Released: October 27, 1998; Label: Epic	101	34	—	—	41	—	—	—	—	RIAJ: Gold
Face2Face	Released: September 11, 2001; Label: Arista	25	8	—	—	13	—	—	—	—	RIAJ: Platinum
Grown & Sexy	Released: July 26, 2005; Label: Arista	10	3	—	—	18	—	—	—	—	
Playlist	Released: September 18, 2007; Label: Island/Mercury	48	7	—	—	49	—	—	—	—	
Love, Marriage & Divorce (with Toni Braxton)	Released: February 4, 2014; Label: Motown	4	1	—	—	73	45	—	75	7	
Return of the Tender Lover	Released: December 4, 2015; Label: Def Jam	39	5	—	—	—	—	—	—	—	
Girls Night Out	Released: October 29, 2022; Label: Capitol	166	— (Note: "Girls Night Out" did not enter the Top R&B/Hip-Hop Albums, but peaked at number 22 on the Top R&B Albums.)	—	—	—	—	—	—	—	
"—" denotes the album failed to chart.

=== Live albums ===
Title	Album details	Chart positions				Certifications
Title	Album details	US	US R&B	AUS	JPN	Certifications
MTV Unplugged NYC 1997	Released: November 25, 1997; Label: Epic	106	33	141	24	RIAA: Gold; MC: Gold; RIAJ: Platinum

=== Remix albums ===
Title	Album details
A Closer Look	Released: November 19, 1991; Label: SOLAR/Epic
The Other Side of Cool	Released: October 25, 2005; Label: Sony BMG

=== Compilation albums ===
Title	Album details	Chart positions	Certifications
Title	Album details	JPN	Certifications
A Collection of His Greatest Hits	Released: November 14, 2000; Label: Sony Music	12	RIAJ: Gold
Love Songs	Released: August 7, 2001; Label: Epic	93	
The Essential Babyface	Released: June 10, 2003; Label: Sony Music	—	
"—" denotes the album failed to chart.

== Singles ==
Year	Single	Chart positions										Certifications	Album
Year	Single	US	US R&B	US AC	US Adult R&B	AUS	NZ	GER	NLD	SWE	UK	Certifications	Album
1986	"I Love You Babe"	—	8	—	—	—	—	—	—	—	—		Lovers
1987	"Lovers"	—	42	—	—	—	—	—	—	—	—		Lovers
1987	"Mary Mack"	—	29	—	—	—	—	—	—	—	—		Lovers
1988	"If We Try"	—	65	—	—	—	—	—	—	—	—		Lovers
1989	"Love Saw It" (with Karyn White)	—	1	—	—	—	—	—	—	—	—		Karyn White
1989	"It's No Crime"	7	1	—	—	153	24	—	—	—	—		Tender Lover
1989	"Tender Lover"	14	1	—	—	143	32	—	—	—	86		Tender Lover
1990	"Whip Appeal"	6	2	36	—	—	—	—	—	—	—		Tender Lover
1990	"My Kinda Girl"	30	3	—	—	—	41	—	—	—	—		Tender Lover
1990	"Love Makes Things Happen" (with Pebbles)	13	1	24	—	—	—	—	—	—	—		Always
1992	"Give U My Heart" (with Toni Braxton)	29	2	—	—	110	41	—	—	—	—		Boomerang
1993	"For the Cool in You"	81	10	—	2	171	23	—	—	—	—		For the Cool in You
1993	"Never Keeping Secrets"	15	3	—	1	—	—	—	—	—	—		For the Cool in You
1994	"And Our Feelings"	21	8	38	4	—	—	—	—	—	—		For the Cool in You
1994	"Rock Bottom"	—	—	—	—	151	—	—	—	—	50		For the Cool in You
1994	"When Can I See You"	4	6	10	1	31	9	—	—	—	35	RIAA: Gold	For the Cool in You
1994	"Where Is My Love?" (with El DeBarge)	—	19	—	8	—	—	—	—	—	—		Heart, Mind and Soul
1994	"Dream Away" (with Lisa Stansfield)	—	80	—	—	—	—	—	—	—	—		The Pagemaster
1995	"Someone to Love" (with Jon B.)	10	7	32	1	50	17	—	—	—	—		Bonafide
1996	"Slow Jams" (with Quincy Jones featuring Tamia, Portrait, SWV and Barry White)	68	19	—	6	—	2	—	—	—	—		Q's Jook Joint
1996	"This Is for the Lover in You" (featuring LL Cool J, Howard Hewett, Jody Watley and Jeffrey Daniel)	6	2	—	21	50	12	—	19	34	12	RIAA: Platinum	The Day
1997	"Every Time I Close My Eyes"	6	5	17	1	40	8	87	93	—	13	RIAA: Platinum	The Day
1997	"How Come, How Long" (featuring Stevie Wonder)	—	—	—	15	5	9	17	2	9	10	ARIA: Platinum	The Day
1997	"Talk to Me"	—	—	—	—	155	50	—	75	—	—		The Day
1997	"(Always Be My) Sunshine" (with Jay-Z featuring Foxy Brown)	95	37	—	—	—	22	18	66	42	25		In My Lifetime, Vol. 1
1998	"Gone Too Soon" (featuring Stevie Wonder)	—	—	—	—	—	—	—	98	—	—		MTV Unplugged NYC 1997
1998	"Fire" (with Des'ree)	—	—	—	—	—	—	—	—	—	—		Hav Plenty
1998	"You Were There"	—	—	—	39	—	—	—	—	—	—		Simon Birch
2000	"Reason for Breathing"	—	59	—	5	—	—	—	99	—	—		A Collection of His Greatest Hits
2001	"There She Goes"	31	10	—	12	—	—	93	—	—	—		Face2Face
2001	"What If"	80	28	—	3	—	—	—	—	—	—		Face2Face
2002	"I Keep Callin'"	—	—	—	16	—	—	—	—	—	—		Face2Face
2004	"The Loneliness"	—	49	—	6	—	—	—	—	—	—		Grown & Sexy
2005	"Sorry for the Stupid Things"	—	65	—	8	—	—	—	—	—	—		Grown & Sexy
2005	"Grown & Sexy"	—	51	—	8	—	—	—	—	—	—		Grown & Sexy
2007	"Fire and Rain"	—	—	10	—	—	—	—	—	—	—		Playlist
2007	"Not Going Nowhere"	—	—	—	39	—	—	—	—	—	—		Playlist
2008	"Comfortable" (with Lil Wayne)	—	76	—	—	—	—	—	—	—	—		Tha Carter III
2008	"I Need a Love Song"	—	53	—	16	—	—	—	—	—	—		Non-album single
2013	"Hurt You" (with Toni Braxton)	—	33	—	1	—	—	—	—	—	—		Love, Marriage & Divorce
2013	"Where Did We Go Wrong" (with Toni Braxton)	—	—	—	11	—	—	—	—	—	—		Love, Marriage & Divorce
2014	"Roller Coaster" (with Toni Braxton)	—	—	—	17	—	—	—	—	—	—		Love, Marriage & Divorce
2015	"We've Got Love"	—	—	—	15	—	—	—	—	—	—		Return of the Tender Lover
2015	"Exceptional"	—	—	—	11	—	—	—	—	—	—		Return of the Tender Lover
2020	"Shoulda" (with Lucky Daye)	—	—	—	16	—	—	—	—	—	—		Painted
2020	"He Don't Know Nothin' 'Bout It" (with Jam & Lewis)	—	— (Note: "He Don't Know Nothin' 'Bout It" did not enter the Hot R&B/Hip-Hop Songs, but peaked at number 16 on the Hot R&B Songs.)	—	4	—	—	—	—	—	—		Jam & Lewis: Volume One
2022	"No Stoppin' Us" (with Charlie Wilson, K-Ci and Johnny Gill)	—	—	—	1	—	—	—	—	—	—		Non-album single
2022	"Keeps on Fallin'" (with Ella Mai)	—	— (Note: "Keeps on Fallin'" did not enter the Hot R&B/Hip-Hop Songs, but peaked at number 21 on the Hot R&B Songs.)	—	2	—	— (Note: "Keeps on Fallin'" did not enter the NZ Top 40 Singles Chart, but peaked at number 37 on the NZ Hot Singles Chart.)	—	—	—	—		Girls Night Out
2023	"As A Matter of Fact"	—	— (Note: "As A Matter of Fact" did not enter the Hot R&B/Hip-Hop Songs, but peaked at number 22 on the Hot R&B Songs.)	—	1	—	—	—	—	—	—		Non-album single
2024	"I Got You" (with Fat Joe)	—	—	—	21	—	—	—	—	—	—		The World Changed On Me
"—" denotes the single failed to chart or not released in that country

== Other appearances ==
=== Album appearances ===
Title	Year	Other artist(s)	Album
"Slow Jams"	1995	Tamia, Portrait and Barry White	Q's Jook Joint
"(Always Be My) Sunshine"	1997	Jay-Z and Foxy Brown	In My Lifetime, Vol. 1
"Fire"	1998	Des'ree	Supernatural
"Not A Game"	2004	Raphael Saadiq	Ray Ray
"If Only for One Night"	2006	—N/a	So Amazing: An All-Star Tribute to Luther Vandross
"Comfortable"	2008	Lil Wayne	Tha Carter III
"No Place Like Home"	2010	Kenny G	Heart and Soul
"Evergreen"	2014	Barbra Streisand	Partners
"Solid"	2015	Ty Dolla $ign	Free TC
"The Christmas Song"	2018	Jessie J	This Christmas Day
"Runaway"	2019	Tiffany Young	Lips on Lips
"Kim Porter"	2023	Diddy, John Legend	The Love Album: Off the Grid

=== Soundtrack appearances ===
Title	Year	Other artist(s)	Album
"Well Alright"	1993	N/A	Poetic Justice
"Someone to Love"	1995	Jon B.	Bad Boys
"Sorry for the Stupid Things"	2007	N/A	Why Did I Get Married?

== Select songwriting and production credits ==
- "A Song for Mama" – Boyz II Men (#1 R&B, #7 US)
- "Adore" – Cashmere Cat ft. Ariana Grande*
- "Ain't Got No Remedy" – Shanice*
- "Always" – Pebbles (feat. Cherrelle and Johnny Gill) (#13 R&B)
- "Always In My Heart" – Tevin Campbell (#6 R&B)
- "Another Sad Love Song" – Toni Braxton (#2 R&B, #7 US)
- "As" – George Michael and Mary J. Blige (#4 UK) (Produced only)
- "At Seventeen" – Celine Dion
- "Baby-Baby-Baby" – TLC (#1 R&B, #2 US)
- “Baby Boy” — Kevin Abstract
- "Baby I" – Ariana Grande (#6 Japan, Gold)
- "Baby I" – Tenderoni
- "Backyard" – Pebbles (feat. Salt-N-Pepa) (#4 R&B)
- "Best Thing I Never Had" – Beyoncé (#4 R&B, #3 UK, #16 US)
- "Betcha Never" – Vanessa Williams
- "Boys & Girls" – Tony! Toni! Tone!
- "Breathe Again" – Toni Braxton (#4 R&B, #3 US, #2 UK)
- "Can I Stay with You" – Karyn White (#10 R&B)
- "Can We Talk" – Tevin Campbell (#1 R&B, #9 US)
- "Can I Get a Moment?" – Jessica Mauboy (#5 Australia, Platinum)
- "Can't Help Myself" – Destiny's Child
- "Can't Stop" – After 7 (#1 R&B, #7 US)
- "Change the World" – Eric Clapton (#5 US, #1 AC)
- "The Color of Love" – Boyz II Men
- "Count on Me" – Whitney Houston and CeCe Winans (#7 R&B, #8 US)
- "Dial My Heart" – The Boys (#1 R&B)
- "Diggin' on You" – TLC (#7 R&B, #5 US)
- "Don't Be Cruel" – Bobby Brown (#1 R&B, #8 US)
- "Don't Wanna Love You" – Shanice
- "Dry Your Eyes" – The Deele (#1 R&B Airplay circa Winter '87)
- "End of the Road" – Boyz II Men (#1 R&B, #1 US, #1 UK)
- "Every Little Step" – Bobby Brown (#1 R&B, #3 US, #6 UK)
- "Exclusivity" – Damian Dame (#1 R&B)
- "Exhale (Shoop Shoop)" – Whitney Houston (#1 R&B, #1 US)
- "Fairweather Friend" – Johnny Gill (#2 R&B)
- "Fire" – Babyface and Des'ree
- "Giving You the Benefit" – Pebbles (#1 R&B, #4 US)
- "Girlfriend" – Pebbles (#1 R&B, #5 US, #8 UK)
- "Good Enough" – Bobby Brown (#5 R&B, #7 US)
- "Give U My Heart" – Babyface and Toni Braxton
- "Hard to Say I'm Sorry" – Az Yet (#8 US, #7 UK) (Produced only)
- "Have I Never" – A Few Good Men
- "Heat of the Moment" – After 7 (#5 R&B)
- "Honeymoon Avenue" – Ariana Grande
- "Humpin' Around" – Bobby Brown (#1 R&B, #3 US)
- "I Care 'Bout You" – Milestone (#10 R&B)
- "I Shoulda Lied" – Boyz II Men
- "I'd Still Say Yes" – Klymaxx (#7 R&B) (Written only)
- "I'll Make Love to You" – Boyz II Men (#1 R&B, #1 US, #1 AC, #5 UK)
- "I'm Like a Lawyer with the Way I'm Always Trying to Get You Off (Me & You)" – Fall Out Boy
- "I'm Ready" – Tevin Campbell (#2 R&B, #9 US)
- "I'm Your Baby Tonight" – Whitney Houston (#1 R&B, #1 US, #5 UK)
- "If Only in Heaven's Eyes" – *NSYNC
- "Just Stand Up!" – Various Artists (#11 US, #10 Canadian Hot 100, #3 FIMI)
- "Knocked Out" – Paula Abdul (#8 R&B)
- "Last Night" – Az Yet (#1 R&B, #9 US)
- "Let It Flow" – Toni Braxton (#1 R&B, #1 US)
- "Love Shoulda Brought You Home" – Toni Braxton (#4 R&B)
- "Love Will Be Waiting" – Kevon Edmonds
- "Love Will Be Waiting at Home" – For Real
- "Lovin' It" – Ariana Grande
- "Lucky Charm" – The Boys (#1 R&B)
- "Miracle" – Whitney Houston (#2 R&B, #9 US)
- "Most Girls" – Pink (#4 US, #5 UK)
- "My, My, My" – Johnny Gill (#1 R&B, # 10 US)
- "My Name Is Not Susan" – Whitney Houston (#8 R&B) (Produced only)
- "Never Forget You" – Mariah Carey (#7 R&B, #3 US)
- "Never Gonna Let You Go" – Faith Evans (#1 R&B)
- "Not Gon' Cry" – Mary J. Blige (#1 R&B, #2 US)
- "On Our Own" – Bobby Brown (#1 R&B, #2 US, #4 UK)
- "One More Dance" – Boyz II Men
- "One Up for Love" – Boyz II Men
- "Pink Champagne – Ariana Grande (Produced only)
- "Ready or Not" – After 7 (#1 R&B, #7 US, #7 AC)
- "Red Light Special" – TLC (#3 R&B, #2 US)
- "Reversal of a Dog" – Damian Dame, Highland Place Mobsters, TLC, Toni Braxton
- "Right Down to It" – Damian Dame (#2 R&B)
- "Rock Steady" – The Whispers (#1 R&B, #7 US)
- "Rock Wit'cha" – Bobby Brown (#3 R&B, #7 US)
- "Roni" – Bobby Brown (#2 R&B, #3 US)
- "Roses Are Red" – The Mac Band (feat. the McCampbell Brothers) (#1 R&B, #8 UK)
- "Secret Rendezvous" – Karyn White (#4 R&B, #6 US)
- "Secrets" – Kat Graham featuring Babyface
- "Seven Whole Days" – Toni Braxton (#1 R&B Airplay)
- "Shoot 'Em Up Movies" – The Deele (#10 R&B)
- "Sittin' Up in My Room" – Brandy (#2 R&B, #2 US)
- "Slow Jam" – Monica, Usher
- "Snooze" – SZA (#2 US)
- "Something in Your Eyes" – Bell Biv Devoe (#38 US, #6 R&B)
- "Something New" – Zendaya featuring Chris Brown
- "Sometimes Love" – Patti LaBelle
- "Superwoman" – Karyn White (#1 R&B, #8 US #5 UK)
- "Sweet November" – Troop (#1 R&B) (Written only)
- "Take a Bow" – Madonna (#1 US, #1 AC)
- "Tattooed Heart" – Ariana Grande
- "The Lover in Me" – Sheena Easton (#5 R&B, #2 US, #15 UK)
- "The Power of the Dream" – Celine Dion (it was written for the opening ceremony of the 1996 Summer Olympics)
- "The Way You Love Me" – Karyn White (#1 R&B, #7 US)
- "There U Go" – Johnny Gill
- "Thnks fr th Mmrs" – Fall Out Boy (#11 US, #12 UK)
- "'Til You Do Me Right" – After 7 (#5 R&B, #31 US)
- "Too Good to Say Goodbye" – Bruno Mars (Songwriting only)
- "Tonight Is Right" – Keith Washington
- "Truly Something Special" – After 7
- "Two Occasions" – The Deele (#4 R&B, # 10 US)
- "Try" – Colbie Caillat
- "Water Runs Dry" – Boyz II Men (#4 R&B, #2 US)
- "We're Not Making Love No More" – Dru Hill (#2 R&B)
- "Whatever" – En Vogue (#8 R&B)
- "When You Believe" – Whitney Houston and Mariah Carey (#4 UK) (Produced only)
- "Where Is My Love?" – El DeBarge
- "Why" – 3T feat. Michael Jackson (#2 UK) (Written only)
- "Why Does It Hurt So Bad" – Whitney Houston
- "Willing to Forgive" – Aretha Franklin (#5 R&B)
- "You Are the Man" – En Vogue
- "You Mean the World to Me" – Toni Braxton (#3 R&B, #7 US)
- "You Were There" – Babyface
- "You'll Never Know" – Ariana Grande
- "You're Makin' Me High" – Toni Braxton (#1 R&B, #1 US, #7 UK)
- "You Can't Run" – Vanessa Williams
