= Love Songs (Babyface album) =

Compilation album by Babyface
- Released: August 7, 2001
- Genre: R&B
- Label: Epic

Babyface chronology
Babyface: A Collection of His Greatest Hits (2000)	Love Songs (2001)	Face2Face (2001)

Love Songs is a compilation album by R&B artist, Babyface that contains songs from his first four studio albums: Lovers (1986), Tender Lover (1989), For the Cool in You (1993), The Day (1996).

AllMusic noted about the album, "Naturally, this cannot act as a substitute for a proper Babyface anthology like The Essential Babyface, but it does dig a little deeper into the type of material Face has done best."

== Track listing ==
1. "I Said I Love You"
2. "All Day Thinkin'"
3. "This Is for the Lover in You" - Babyface, LL Cool J
4. "Lady, Lady"
5. "For the Cool in You"
6. "A Bit Old Fashioned"
7. "Never Keeping Secrets"
8. "When Can I See You"
9. "Whip Appeal"
10. "Soon as I Get Home"
11. "Given a Chance"
12. "Sunshine"
13. "Every Time I Close My Eyes" - Babyface, Kenny G, Mariah Carey
14. "When Your Body Gets Weak"
15. "Lovers"
16. "You Make Me Feel Brand New"
