= The Other Side of Cool =

Remix album by Babyface
- Released: October 25, 2005
- Genres: R&B, dance
- Label: Sony BMG

Babyface chronology
The Essential Babyface (2003)	The Other Side of Cool (2005)	Grown & Sexy (2005)

The Other Side of Cool is an album by R&B artist Babyface, and is a remix compilation of some of his singles.

AllMusic rated it three stars and noted, "Most of the selections hold up well, despite being tied to the club trends of the time."

== Track listing ==
1. "It's No Crime" (IJ Extended Mix) (7:44)
2. "For the Cool in You" (Chicago House Club Vocal Mix) (5:20)
3. "My Kinda Girl" (Scratch Mix) (7:09)
4. "Whip Appeal" (The Ultimate Whip Mix) (5:30)
5. "Tender Lover" (The Long Mix) (7:55)
6. "Every Time I Close My Eyes" (Timbaland Remix) (4:55)
7. "How Come, How Long" feat. Stevie Wonder (Laws & Craigie Remix) (6:28)
8. "Rock Bottom" (CJ Deep Club Mix) (4:30)
9. "This Is for the Lover in You" feat. Ghostface Killah (Puffy's Face To Face Mix) (4:43)
10. "When Can I See You" (Urban Soul Basement Mix) (6:40)
