= The Essential Babyface =

Greatest hits album by Babyface
- Released: June 10, 2003
- Genres: R&B; pop rock
- Length: 66:34
- Labels: Sony Music, Epic

Babyface chronology
Face2Face (2001)	The Essential Babyface (2003)	The Other Side of Cool (2005)

Professional ratings
Review scores
Source	Rating
AllMusic	4.5/5 stars

The Essential Babyface is the eleventh album by R&B artist, Babyface and is a compilation of some of his singles. The release is part of Sony BMG's The Essential series.

== Track listing ==
All songs are written by Babyface, except as noted.

1. "I Said I Love You" - 4:05
2. "Never Keeping Secrets" - 4:50
3. "Every Time I Close My Eyes" - feat. Mariah Carey & Kenny G - 4:57
4. "Talk to Me" - 4:54
5. "When Can I See You" - 3:49
6. "For the Cool in You" (Babyface, Daryl Simmons)- 4:53
7. "My Kinda Girl" (Babyface, Daryl Simmons, L.A. Reid) - 4:39
8. "Whip Appeal" Babyface, Perri "Pebbles" Reid - 5:47
9. "Soon as I Get Home" - 5:08
10. "Well Alright" (From Poetic Justice) - 4:00
11. "Day (That You Gave Me a Son)" - 4:26
12. "How Come, How Long" - feat. Stevie Wonder (Babyface, Stevie Wonder) - 5:11
13. "This Is for the Lover in You" - feat. Jeffrey Daniels, Howard Hewett, LL Cool J & Jody Watley (Howard Hewett, Dana Meyers) - 4:01
14. Medley: "I'll Make Love to You/End of the Road" [Live] (Babyface, Daryl Simmons, L.A. Reid) - 2:01
15. Medley: "I'll Make Love to You/End of the Road" (Continued) [Live] (Babyface, Daryl Simmons, L.A. Reid) - 3:53
