= Babyface: A Collection of His Greatest Hits =

A Collection of His Greatest Hits

Greatest hits album by Babyface
- Released: November 14, 2000
- Genre: R&B
- Length: 70:43 (standard edition)
- Label: Sony Music

Babyface chronology
| Christmas with Babyface (1998) | A Collection of His Greatest Hits (2000) | Love Songs (2001) |

Professional ratings
Review scores
| Source | Rating |
|---|---|
| AllMusic | 4.5/5 stars |
| Robert Christgau | A− |
| Entertainment Weekly | C |

A Collection of His Greatest Hits is a compilation album by the American recording artist Babyface, released in 2000.

== Track listing ==
| No. | Title | Writer(s) | Length |
|---|---|---|---|
| 1. | "For the Cool in You" | Babyface, Daryl Simmons | 4:54 |
| 2. | "It's No Crime" | Babyface, Antonio "L.A." Reid, Simmons | 4:02 |
| 3. | "Whip Appeal" (12" version) | Babyface, Perri "Pebbles" Reid | 5:46 |
| 4. | "Never Keeping Secrets" | Babyface | 4:53 |
| 5. | "Every Time I Close My Eyes" (feat. Mariah Carey, Kenny G, Sheila E.) | Babyface | 4:57 |
| 6. | "When Can I See You" | Babyface | 3:48 |
| 7. | "Reason for Breathing" (Album edit) | Scott Andrews, Quincy Patrick, Joe Thomas, Joshua P. Thompson, Warren Wilson | 5:42 |
| 8. | "This Is for the Lover in You" (feat. LL Cool J, Howard Hewett, Jody Watley & Jeffrey Daniel) | Howard Hewett, Dana Myers | 4:00 |
| 9. | "How Come, How Long" (feat. Stevie Wonder) | Babyface, Stevie Wonder | 5:12 |
| 10. | "Change the World" (feat. Eric Clapton) | Tommy Sims, Gordon Kennedy, Wayne Kirkpatrick | 7:32 |
| 11. | "I Love You Babe" | Babyface | 4:09 |
| 12. | "Soon As I Get Home" | Babyface | 5:08 |
| 13. | "Where Will You Go" | Babyface | 5:08 |
| 14. | "When Men Grow Old" | Babyface | 5:32 |

Bonus track (Japanese edition)
| No. | Title | Writer(s) | Length |
|---|---|---|---|
| 15. | "Two Occasions" (Live version) | Babyface, Darnell "Dee" Bristol, Sid Johnson | 5:53 |

== Charts ==
=== Weekly charts ===
| Chart | Position |
|---|---|
| Japanese Oricon Albums Chart | 12 |

=== Certifications ===
| Region | Certification | Certified units/sales |
|---|---|---|
| Japan (RIAJ) | Gold | 100,000^{^} |
^{^} Shipments figures based on certification alone.
