= Soul Train Music Award for Best R&B/Soul Single – Male =

Annual US music award

This page lists the winners and nominees for the Soul Train Music Award for Best R&B/Soul Single – Male. The award was given out every year since the first annual Soul Train Music Awards in 1987. From 1989 to 1992 the award was known as R&B/Urban Contemporary Single – Male. When the Soul Train Music Awards returned in 2009 the categories of Best R&B/Soul Single – Male and Best R&B/Soul Album – Male were consolidated into the Best R&B/Soul Male Artist category. Michael Jackson has won the most awards in this category, with a total of three wins.

== Winners and nominees ==
Winners are listed first and highlighted in bold.

=== 1980s ===
| Year | Artist | Single | Ref |
|---|---|---|---|
1987
| 1987 | **Gregory Abbott** | **"Shake You Down"** | |
| 1987 | Freddie Jackson | "Tasty Love" | |
| 1987 | Prince | "Kiss" | |
| 1987 | Luther Vandross | "Give Me the Reason" | |
1988
| 1988 | **Michael Jackson** | **"Bad"** | |
| 1988 | Prince | "U Got the Look" | |
| 1988 | Luther Vandross | "So Amazing" | |
| 1988 | Stevie Wonder | "Skeletons" | |
1989
| 1989 | **Michael Jackson** | **"Man in the Mirror"** | |
| 1989 | Bobby Brown | "My Prerogative" | |
| 1989 | Johnny Kemp | "Just Got Paid" | |
| 1989 | Keith Sweat (featuring Jacci McGhee) | "Make It Last Forever" | |

=== 1990s ===
| Year | Artist | Single | Ref |
|---|---|---|---|
1990
| 1990 | **Luther Vandross** | **"Here and Now"** | |
| 1990 | Babyface | "It's No Crime" | |
| 1990 | Bobby Brown | "Every Little Step" | |
| 1990 | Eric Gable | "Remember (The First Time)" | |
1991
| 1991 | **Johnny Gill** | **"My, My, My"** | |
| 1991 | Babyface | "Whip Appeal" | |
| 1991 | MC Hammer | "U Can't Touch This" | |
| 1991 | James Ingram | "I Don't Have the Heart" | |
1992
| 1992 | **Keith Washington** | **"Kissing You"** | |
| 1992 | Michael Jackson | "Black or White" | |
| 1992 | Tony Terry | "With You" | |
| 1992 | Luther Vandross | "Power of Love/Love Power" | |
1993
| 1993 | **Michael Jackson** | **"Remember the Time"** | |
| 1993 | Chuckii Booker | "Games" | |
| 1993 | Bobby Brown | "Humpin' Around" | |
| 1993 | Sir Mix-a-lot | "Baby Got Back" | |
1994
| 1994 | **Tevin Campbell** | **"Can We Talk"** | |
| 1994 | Babyface | "Never Keeping Secrets" | |
| 1994 | Dr. Dre | "Nuthin' but a 'G' Thang | |
| 1994 | Luther Vandross | "Heaven Knows" | |
1995
| 1995 | **R. Kelly** | **"Bump n' Grind"** | |
| 1995 | Babyface | "When Can I See You" | |
| 1995 | Aaron Hall | "I Miss You" | |
| 1995 | Barry White | "Practice What You Preach" | |
1996
| 1996 | **D'Angelo** | **"Brown Sugar"** | |
| 1996 | Michael Jackson | "You Are Not Alone" | |
| 1996 | Montell Jordan | "This Is How We Do It" | |
| 1996 | Seal | "Kiss from a Rose" | |
1997
| 1997 | **Maxwell** | **"Ascension (Don't Ever Wonder)"** | |
| 1997 | D'Angelo | "Lady" | |
| 1997 | Joe | "All the Things (Your Man Won't Do)" | |
| 1997 | Keith Sweat | "Twisted" | |
1998
| 1998 | **Usher** | **"You Make Me Wanna..."** | |
| 1998 | Joe | "Don't Wanna Be a Player" | |
| 1998 | R. Kelly | "I Believe I Can Fly" | |
| 1998 | Kenny Lattimore | "For You" | |
1999
| 1999 | **Brian McKnight** | **"Anytime"** | |
| 1999 | Jon B. | "They Don't Know" | |
| 1999 | Kirk Franklin (featuring R. Kelly, Mary J. Blige, Bono, Crystal Lewis and the Family) | "Lean on Me" | |
| 1999 | R. Kelly | "Half on a Baby" | |

=== 2000s ===
| Year | Artist | Single | Ref |
|---|---|---|---|
2000
| 2000 | **Maxwell** | **"Fortunate"** | |
| 2000 | Ginuwine | "So Anxious" | |
| 2000 | Donell Jones | "U Know What's Up" | |
| 2000 | Brian McKnight | "Back at One" | |
2001
| 2001 | **R. Kelly** | **"I Wish"** | |
| 2001 | Avant | "Separated" | |
| 2001 | D'Angelo | "Untitled (How Does It Feel)" | |
| 2001 | Carl Thomas | "I Wish" | |
2002
| 2002 | **Musiq Soulchild** | **"Love"** | |
| 2002 | Jaheim | "Just in Case" | |
| 2002 | Brian McKnight | "Love of My Life" | |
| 2002 | Usher | "U Got It Bad" | |
2003
| 2003 | **Musiq Soulchild** | **"Dontchange"** | |
| 2003 | Maxwell | "This Woman's Work" | |
| 2003 | Justin Timberlake | "Like I Love You" | |
| 2003 | Usher | "U Don't Have to Call" | |
2004
| 2004 | **Luther Vandross** | **"Dance with My Father"** | |
| 2004 | Anthony Hamilton | "Comin' From Where I'm From" | |
| 2004 | Jaheim | "Put That Woman First" | |
| 2004 | Pharrell (featuring Jay Z) | "Frontin'" | |
2005
| 2005 | **Usher** | **"Confessions Part II"** | |
| 2005 | Anthony Hamilton | "Charlene" | |
| 2005 | Mario | "Let Me Love You" | |
| 2005 | Prince | "Call My Name" | |
2006
| 2006 | **John Legend** | **"Ordinary People"** | |
| 2006 | R. Kelly | "Trapped in the Closet" | |
| 2006 | Bobby Valentino | "Slow Down" | |
| 2006 | Charlie Wilson | "Charlie, Last Name Wilson" | |
2007
| 2007 | **John Legend** | **"Save Room"** | |
| 2007 | Avant | "4 Minutes" | |
| 2007 | Chris Brown | "Yo (Excuse Me Miss)" | |
| 2007 | Ne-Yo | "Sexy Love" | |
