= A Closer Look (Babyface album) =

Remix album by Babyface
- Released: November 19, 1991
- Recorded: 1990–91, 1987 ("Two Occasions" live version)
- Genre: R&B; soul; new jack swing; quiet storm
- Length: 64:30
- Label: SOLAR; Epic
- Producer: L.A. Reid & Babyface; 3 Boyz from Newark; The Ghostbrothers; Rodney Ascue; Roger Sanchez; Troy Taylor; Charles Farrar; Blaze; Eric Schilling; Nick Martinelli; Yvonne Turner

Babyface chronology
Tender Lover (1989)	A Closer Look (1991)	For the Cool in You (1993)

Professional ratings
Review scores
Source	Rating
AllMusic	4/5 stars
Calgary Herald	C
The Encyclopedia of Popular Music	2/5 stars
The Rolling Stone Album Guide	3.5/5 stars

A Closer Look is a remix album, and the third album overall, by American R&B musician Babyface. The album was released on November 19, 1991. It has the distinction of being the last album released by Dick Griffey's SOLAR (Sound of Los Angeles Records), as a joint venture with Epic Records.

== Track listing ==
No.	Title	Length
1.	"Mary Mack" (3 Boyz From Newark Remix)	6:08
2.	"Two Occasions" (Live)	5:50
3.	"I Love You Babe" (The Ghostbrothers & Rodney Ascue Remix - Kenneth Richardson Keyboards)	4:07
4.	"Chivalry" (The Characters Remix)	4:40
5.	"Lovers" (Roger S Remix)	5:04
6.	"It's No Crime" (Blaze Remix)	6:55
7.	"Love Saw It" (featuring Karyn White; Eric Schilling & Nick Martinelli Remix)	6:12
8.	"Love Makes Things Happen" (featuring Pebbles; Eric Schilling & Nick Martinelli Remix)	5:30
9.	"My Kinda Girl" (James Alfano & Yvonne Turner Remix)	7:33
10.	"Whip Appeal" (Blaze Remix)	5:32
11.	"Lovers" (Jazz Lover's Mix)	6:30
