= 65th Annual Grammy Awards =

2023 US music awards ceremony

- Date: February 5, 2023; Main ceremony 5:00–8:30 pm PST (UTC−8); Premiere ceremony 12:30–4:00 pm PST
- Venue: Crypto.com Arena
- Hosted by: Trevor Noah

Highlights
- Most awards: Beyoncé; Maverick City Music (4 each)
- Most nominations: Beyoncé (9)
- Website: grammy.com

Television/radio coverage
- Network: CBS; Paramount+
- Viewership: 12.4 million

The 65th Annual Grammy Awards ceremony was held at the Crypto.com Arena in Los Angeles on February 5, 2023. It recognized the best recordings, compositions, and artists of the eligibility year – October 1, 2021 to September 30, 2022 – as determined by the members of National Academy of Recording Arts and Sciences. The nominations were announced on November 15, 2022. South African comedian Trevor Noah, who hosted the 63rd and 64th ceremonies, returned again.

Beyoncé received the most nominations (nine) and tied Maverick City Music for wins (four), followed by Kendrick Lamar with eight nominations and three wins, and Adele and Brandi Carlile with seven nominations each. With a career total of 88 nominations, Beyoncé tied with her husband Jay-Z as the most nominated artists in Grammy history. Bad Bunny's Un Verano Sin Ti (2022) became the first Spanish-language album to be nominated for Album of the Year.

With her win in the Best Dance/Electronic Album category, Beyoncé passed Hungarian-British conductor Georg Solti for the record of most Grammy awards in the ceremony's history, with 32. Harry Styles won Album of the Year for Harry's House, becoming the first male British solo artist to win since George Michael in 1989. Lizzo won Record of the Year for "About Damn Time", becoming the first black woman to win the award since Whitney Houston in 1994. Bonnie Raitt won Song of the Year for "Just Like That", becoming the first female solo songwriter to win since Amy Winehouse in 2008. Samara Joy won Best New Artist, becoming the first jazz artist to win the award since Esperanza Spalding in 2011. Sam Smith and Kim Petras won Best Pop Duo/Group Performance for "Unholy", making Petras the first transgender artist to win the award.

With her win in the Best Audio Book, Narration & Storytelling Recording category, Viola Davis became the 18th person to win the EGOT in her entertainment career.

== Background ==
For the 2023 ceremony, the academy announced several changes for different categories and eligibility rules:

=== Category changes ===
- Five categories – Best Alternative Music Performance, Best Americana Performance, Best Score Soundtrack for Video Games and Other Interactive Media, Best Spoken Word Poetry Album, and Songwriter of the Year, Non-Classical – were added.
- A Special Merit Award, Best Song for Social Change, was added. The award will be determined by a Blue Ribbon Committee and is destined to reward songs that "contain lyrical content that addresses a timely social issue and promotes understanding, peacebuilding and empathy".
- For the categories of Best Opera Recording and Best Classical Compendium, composers and librettists became eligible for the award.
- Best New Age Album was renamed Best New Age, Ambient or Chant Album.
- For Best Musical Theater Album, composers and lyricists of more than 50% of the score of a new recording became eligible for the award.
- Best Spoken Word Album was renamed Best Audio Book, Narration & Storytelling Recording. Spoken word poetry is no longer eligible for this award and is now recognized with the Best Spoken Word Poetry Album category.

=== Album eligibility ===
- In order to be eligible for consideration, albums must contain greater than 75% playing time of newly recorded music; the previous eligibility rule was 50%. This rule does not apply to the categories of Best Compilation Soundtrack, Best Historical Album, Best Immersive Audio Album, Best Recording Package, Best Special Package, and Best Album Notes.

=== Craft committees ===
- For three categories of the classical music field (Producer of the Year, Classical, Best Engineered Album, Classical and Best Contemporary Classical Composition) the nominations will be determined by specialized craft committees.

== Performers ==
=== Premiere ceremony ===
The performers for the ceremony were announced on January 29, 2023.

List of performers at the premiere ceremony
Artist(s)	Song(s)
The Blind Boys of Alabama La Santa Cecilia Bob Mintzer Shoshana Bean Buddy Guy Maranda Curtis	"I Just Want to Celebrate"
Samara Joy	"Can't Get Out of This Mood"
Arooj Aftab Anoushka Shankar	"Udhero Na"
Carlos Vives	"La Gota Fría" "Pa' Mayté"
Madison Cunningham	"Life According to Raechel"

=== Main ceremony ===
The first wave of performers for the ceremony were announced on January 25, 2023, with Harry Styles confirmed a few days later. Performers for the In Memoriam segment were announced on February 1, 2023. The 50 Years of Hip Hop performance was announced on February 3.

List of performers at the 65th Annual Grammy Awards
Artist(s)	Song(s)
Bad Bunny	"El Apagón" "Después de la Playa"
Brandi Carlile	"Broken Horses"
Stevie Wonder WanMor Smokey Robinson Chris Stapleton	Tribute to Berry Gordy and Smokey Robinson "The Way You Do the Things You Do" "The Tears of a Clown" "Higher Ground"
Lizzo	"About Damn Time" "Special"
Harry Styles	"As It Was"
Kacey Musgraves Quavo Maverick City Music Sheryl Crow Mick Fleetwood Bonnie Raitt	In Memoriam "Coal Miner's Daughter" (tribute to Loretta Lynn) "Without You" "See You Again" (tribute to Takeoff) "Songbird" (tribute to Christine McVie)
Sam Smith Kim Petras	"Unholy"
Mary J. Blige	"Good Morning Gorgeous"
The Roots Black Thought Grandmaster Flash Barshon Rahiem Melle Mel Scorpio Run-DMC LL Cool J DJ Jazzy Jeff Salt-N-Pepa Rakim Public Enemy (Chuck D and Flavor Flav) De La Soul Scarface Ice-T Queen Latifah Method Man Big Boi Busta Rhymes and Spliff Star Missy Elliott Nelly and City Spud Too Short Swizz Beatz and The Lox Lil Baby GloRilla Lil Uzi Vert	50 Years of Hip-Hop "Flash to the Beat" "The Message" "King of Rock" "I Can't Live Without My Radio" "Rock the Bells" "My Mic Sounds Nice" "Eric B. Is President" "Rebel Without a Pause" "El Shabazz" "Buddy" "Mind Playing Tricks on Me" "New Jack Hustler (Nino's Theme)" "U.N.I.T.Y." "Method Man" "ATLiens" "Put Your Hands Where My Eyes Could See" "Look at Me Now" "Lose Control" "Hot in Herre" "Blow the Whistle" "We Gonna Make It" "Freestyle" "F.N.F. (Let's Go)" "Just Wanna Rock"
Luke Combs	"Going, Going, Gone"
Steve Lacy Thundercat	"Bad Habit"
DJ Khaled Jay-Z Lil Wayne Rick Ross John Legend Fridayy	"God Did"

== Presenters ==
Premiere ceremony

- Randy Rainbow – host
- Babyface
- Domi and JD Beck
- Myles Frost
- Arturo O'Farrill
- Malcolm-Jamal Warner
- Jimmy Jam
- Judy Collins
- Amanda Gorman

Main ceremony

- Catherine Carlile – introduced Brandi Carlile
- Jennifer Lopez – presented Best Pop Vocal Album
- Viola Davis – presented Best R&B Song
- Shania Twain – presented Best Country Album
- Billy Crystal – introduced Stevie Wonder, Smokey Robinson and Chris Stapleton
- Smokey Robinson – presented Best Pop Duo/Group Performance
- Jayla Sullivan – introduced Lizzo
- SZA – presented Best Musica Urbana Album
- Kid Harpoon – introduced Harry Styles
- Cardi B – presented Best Rap Album
- Madonna – introduced Sam Smith and Kim Petras
- James Corden – presented Best Dance/Electronic Music Album
- LL Cool J – presented inaugural Dr. Dre Global Impact Award to Dr. Dre
- Dwayne Johnson – presented Best Pop Solo Performance
- Jill Biden – presented Best Song for Social Change and Song of the Year
- Chris Martin – presented Record of the Year
- Olivia Rodrigo – presented Best New Artist
- Trevor Noah – presented Album of the Year

== Winners and nominees ==
The following are the winners and nominees of the 65th annual Grammy Awards. Winners appear first and highlighted in bold.

=== General field ===
Record of the Year

- **"About Damn Time" – Lizzo**
  - **Ricky Reed and Blake Slatkin, producers; Patrick Kehrier, Bill Malina and Manny Marroquin, engineers/mixers; Emerson Mancini, mastering engineer**
- "Don't Shut Me Down" – ABBA
  - Benny Andersson, producer; Benny Andersson and Bernard Löhr, engineers/mixers; Björn Engelmann, mastering engineer
- "Easy on Me" – Adele
  - Greg Kurstin, producer; Julian Burg, Tom Elmhirst and Greg Kurstin, engineers/mixers; Randy Merrill, mastering engineer
- "Break My Soul" – Beyoncé
  - Beyoncé, Terius "The-Dream" Gesteelde-Diamant, Jens Christian Isaksen and Christopher "Tricky" Stewart, producers; Brandon Harding, Chris McLaughlin and Stuart White, engineers/mixers; Colin Leonard, mastering engineer
- "Good Morning Gorgeous" – Mary J. Blige
  - D'Mile and H.E.R., producers; Bryce Bordone, Şerban Ghenea and Pat Kelly, engineers/mixers
- "You and Me on the Rock" – Brandi Carlile featuring Lucius
  - Dave Cobb and Shooter Jennings, producers; Brandon Bell, Tom Elmhirst and Michael Harris, engineers/mixers; Pete Lyman, mastering engineer
- "Woman" – Doja Cat
  - Crate Classics, Linden Jay, Aynzli Jones and Yeti Beats, producers; Jesse Ray Ernster and Rian Lewis, engineers/mixers; Mike Bozzi, mastering engineer
- "Bad Habit" – Steve Lacy
  - Steve Lacy, producer; Neal Pogue and Karl Wingate, engineers/mixers; Mike Bozzi, mastering engineer
- "The Heart Part 5" – Kendrick Lamar
  - Beach Noise, producer; Beach Noise, Rob Bisel, Ray Charles Brown Jr., James Hunt, Johnny Kosich, Matt Schaeffer and Johnathan Turner, engineers/mixers; Emerson Mancini, mastering engineer
- "As It Was" – Harry Styles
  - Tyler Johnson and Kid Harpoon, producers; Jeremy Hatcher and Spike Stent, engineers/mixers; Randy Merrill, mastering engineer

Album of the Year

- **Harry's House – Harry Styles**
  - **Tyler Johnson, Kid Harpoon and Sammy Witte, producers; Jeremy Hatcher, Oli Jacobs, Nick Lobel, Spike Stent and Sammy Witte, engineers/mixers; Amy Allen, Tobias Jesso Jr., Tyler Johnson, Kid Harpoon, Mitch Rowland, Harry Styles and Sammy Witte, songwriters; Randy Merrill, mastering engineer**
- Voyage – ABBA
  - Benny Andersson, producer; Benny Andersson and Bernard Löhr, engineers/mixers; Benny Andersson and Björn Ulvaeus, songwriters; Björn Engelmann, mastering engineer
- 30 – Adele
  - Shawn Everett, Ludwig Göransson, Inflo, Tobias Jesso Jr., Greg Kurstin, Max Martin, Joey Pecoraro and Shellback, producers; Julian Burg, Steve Churchyard, Tom Elmhirst, Shawn Everett, Şerban Ghenea, Sam Holland, Michael Ilbert, Inflo, Greg Kurstin, Riley Mackin and Lasse Mårtén, engineers/mixers; Adele Adkins, Ludwig Göransson, Dean Josiah Cover, Tobias Jesso Jr., Greg Kurstin, Max Martin and Shellback, songwriters; Randy Merrill, mastering engineer
- Un Verano Sin Ti – Bad Bunny
  - Rauw Alejandro, Buscabulla, Chencho Corleone, Jhay Cortez, Tony Dize, Bomba Estéreo and The Marías, featured artists; Demy and Clipz, Elikai, HAZE, La Paciencia, Cheo Legendary, MAG, MagicEnElBeat, Mora, Jota Rosa, Subelo Neo and Tainy, producers; Josh Gudwin and Roberto Rosado, engineers/mixers; Raul Alejandro Ocasio Ruiz, Benito Antonio Martinez Ocasio, Raquel Berrios, Joshua Conway, Mick Coogan, Orlando Javier Valle Vega, Jesus Nieves Cortes, Luis Del Valle, Marcos Masis, Gabriel Mora, Elena Rose, Liliana Margarita Saumet and Maria Zardoya, songwriters; Colin Leonard, mastering engineer
- Renaissance – Beyoncé
  - Beam, Grace Jones and Tems, featured artists; Jameil Aossey, Bah, Beam, Beyoncé, BloodPop, Boi-1da, Cadenza, Al Cres, Mike Dean, Honey Dijon, Kelman Duran, Harry Edwards, Terius "The-Dream" Gesteelde-Diamant, Ivor Guest, GuiltyBeatz, Hit-Boy, Jens Christian Isaksen, Leven Kali, Lil Ju, MeLo-X, No I.D., Nova Wav, Chris Penny, P2J, Rissi, S1a0, Raphael Saadiq, Neenyo, Skrillex, Luke Solomon, Christopher "Tricky" Stewart, Jahaan Sweet, Syd, Sevn Thomas, Sol Was and Stuart White, producers; Chi Coney, Russell Graham, Guiltybeatz, Brandon Harding, Hotae Alexander Jang, Chris McLaughlin, Delroy "Phatta" Pottinger, Andrea Roberts, Steve Rusch, Matheus Braz, Jabbar Stevens and Stuart White, engineers/mixers; Denisia "@Blu June" Andrews, Danielle Balbuena, Tyshane Thompson, Kevin Marquis Bellmon, Sydney Bennett, Beyoncé, Jerel Black, Michael Tucker, Atia Boggs p/k/a Ink, Dustin Bowie, David Debrandon Brown, S. Carter, Nija Charles, Sabrina Claudio, Solomon Fagenson Cole, Brittany "@Chi_Coney" Coney, Alexander Guy Cook, Levar Coppin, Almando Cresso, Mike Dean, Saliou Diagne, Darius Scott, Jocelyn Donald, Jordan Douglas, Aubrey Drake Graham, Kelman Duran, Terius "The-Dream" Gesteelde-Diamant, Dave Giles II, Derrick Carrington Gray, Nick Green, Larry Griffin Jr, Ronald Banful, Dave Hamelin, Aviel Calev Hirschfield, Chauncey Hollis, Jr., Ariowa Irosogie, Leven Kali, Ricky Lawson, Tizita Makuria, Julian Martrel Mason, Daniel Memmi, Cherdericka Nichols, Ernest "No I.D." Wilson, Temilade Openiyi, Patrick Paige II From The Internet, Jimi Stephen Payton, Christopher Lawrence Penny, Michael Pollack, Richard Isong, Honey Redmond, Derek Renfroe, Andrew Richardson, Morten Ristorp, Nile Rodgers, Oliver Rodigan, Freddie Ross, Raphael Saadiq, Matthew Samuels, Sean Seaton, Skrillex, Corece Smith, Luke Francis Matthew Solomon, Jabbar Stevens, Christopher A. Stewart, Jahaan Sweet, Rupert Thomas, Jr. and Jesse Wilson, songwriters; Colin Leonard, mastering engineer
- Good Morning Gorgeous (Deluxe) – Mary J. Blige
  - DJ Khaled, Dave East, Fabolous, Fivio Foreign, Griselda, H.E.R., Jadakiss, Moneybagg Yo, Ne-Yo, Anderson .Paak, Remy Ma and Usher, featured artists; Alissia, Tarik Azzouz, Bengineer, Blacka Din Me, Rogét Chahayed, Cool & Dre, Ben Billions, DJ Cassidy, DJ Khaled, D'Mile, Wonda, Bongo Bytheway, H.E.R., Hostile Beats, Eric Hudson, London on da Track, Leon Michels, Nova Wav, Anderson.Paak, Sl!Mwav, Streetrunner, Swizz Beatz and J. White Did It, producers; Derek Ali, Ben Chang, Luis Bordeaux, Bryce Bordone, Lauren D'Elia, Chris Galland, Şerban Ghenea, Akeel Henry, Jaycen Joshua, Pat Kelly, Jhair Lazo, Shamele Mackie, Manny Marroquin, Dave Medrano, Ari Morris, Parks, Juan Peña, Ben Sedano, Kev Spencer, Julio Ulloa and Jodie Grayson Williams, engineers/mixers; Alissia Beneviste, Denisia "Blu June" Andrews, Archer, Bianca Atterberry, Tarik Azzouz, Mary J. Blige, David Brewster, David Brown, Shawn Butler, Rogét Chahayed, Ant Clemons, Brittany "Chi" Coney, Kasseem Dean, Benjamin Diehl, DJ Cassidy, Jocelyn Donald, Jerry Duplessis, Uforo Ebong, Dernst Emile II, John Jackson, Adriana Flores, Gabriella Wilson, Shawn Hibbler, Charles A. Hinshaw, Jamie Hurton, Eric Hudson, Jason Phillips, Khaled Khaled, London Holmes, Andre "Dre" Christopher Lyon, Reminisce Mackie, Leon Michels, Jerome Monroe, Jr., Kim Owens, Brandon Anderson, Jeremie "Benny The Butcher" Pennick, Bryan Ponce, Demond "Conway The Machine" Price, Peter Skellern, Shaffer Smith, Nicholas Warwar, Deforrest Taylor, Tiara Thomas, Marcello "Cool" Valenzano, Alvin "Westside Gunn" Worthy, Anthony Jermaine White and Leon Youngblood, songwriters
- In These Silent Days – Brandi Carlile
  - Lucius, featured artist; Dave Cobb and Shooter Jennings, producers; Brandon Bell, Dave Cobb, Tom Elmhirst, Michael Harris and Shooter Jennings, engineers/mixers; Brandi Carlile, Dave Cobb, Phil Hanseroth and Tim Hanseroth, songwriters; Pete Lyman, mastering engineer
- Music of the Spheres – Coldplay
  - BTS, Jacob Collier, Selena Gomez and We Are KING, featured artists; Jacob Collier, Daniel Green, Oscar Holter, Jon Hopkins, Max Martin, Metro Boomin, Kang Hyo-Won, Bill Rahko, Bart Schoudel, Rik Simpson, Paris Strother and We Are KING, producers; Guy Berryman, Jonny Buckland, Will Champion, Jacob Collier, The Dream Team, Duncan Fuller, Şerban Ghenea, Daniel Green, John Hanes, Jon Hopkins, Michael Ilbert, Max Martin, Bill Rahko, Bart Schoudel, Rik Simpson and Paris Strother, engineers/mixers; Guy Berryman, Jonny Buckland, Denise Carite, Will Champion, Jacob Collier, Derek Dixie, Sam Falson, Stephen Fry, Daniel Green, Oscar Holter, Jon Hopkins, Jung Ho-Seok, Chris Martin, Max Martin, John Metcalfe, Leland Tyler Wayne, Bill Rahko, Kim Nam-Joon, Jesse Rogg, Davide Rossi, Rik Simpson, Amber Strother, Paris Strother, Min Yoon-Gi, Federico Vindver and Olivia Waithe, songwriters; Randy Merrill, mastering engineer
- Mr. Morale & the Big Steppers – Kendrick Lamar
  - Baby Keem, Blxst, Sam Dew, Ghostface Killah, Beth Gibbons, Kodak Black, Tanna Leone, Taylour Paige, Amanda Reifer, Sampha and Summer Walker, featured artists; The Alchemist, Baby Keem, Craig Balmoris, Beach Noise, Bekon, Boi-1da, Cardo, Dahi, DJ Khalil, The Donuts, FnZ, Frano, Sergiu Gherman, Emile Haynie, J.LBS, Mario Luciano, Tyler Mehlenbacher, OKLAMA, Rascal, Sounwave, Jahaan Sweet, Tae Beast, Duval Timothy and Pharrell Williams, producers; Derek Ali, Matt Anthony, Beach Noise, Rob Bisel, David Bishop, Troy Bourgeois, Andrew Boyd, Ray Charles Brown Jr., Derek Garcia, Chad Gordon, James Hunt, Johnny Kosich, Manny Marroquin, Erwing Olivares, Raymond J Scavo III, Matt Schaeffer, Cyrus Taghipour, Johnathan Turner and Joe Visciano, engineers/mixers; Khalil Abdul-Rahman, Hykeem Carter, Craig Balmoris, Beach Noise, Daniel Tannenbaum, Daniel Tannenbaum, Stephen Lee Bruner, Matthew Burdette, Isaac John De Boni, Sam Dew, Anthony Dixson, Victor Ekpo, Sergiu Gherman, Dennis Coles, Beth Gibbons, Frano Huett, Stuart Johnson, Bill K. Kapri, Jake Kosich, Johnny Kosich, Daniel Krieger, Kendrick Lamar, Ronald LaTour, Mario Luciano, Daniel Alan Maman, Timothy Maxey, Tyler Mehlenbacher, Michael John Mulé, D. Natche, OKLAMA, Jason Pounds, Rascal, Amanda Reifer, Matthew Samuels, Avante Santana, Matt Schaeffer, Sampha Sisay, Mark Spears, Homer Steinweiss, Jahaan Akil Sweet, Donte Lamar Perkins, Duval Timothy, Summer Walker and Pharrell Williams, songwriters; Emerson Mancini, mastering engineer
- Special – Lizzo
  - Benny Blanco, Quelle Chris, Daoud, Omer Fedi, ILYA, Kid Harpoon, Ian Kirkpatrick, Max Martin, Nate Mercereau, The Monsters & Strangerz, Phoelix, Ricky Reed, Mark Ronson, Blake Slatkin and Pop Wansel, producers; Benny Blanco, Bryce Bordone, Jeff Chestek, Jacob Ferguson, Şerban Ghenea, Jeremy Hatcher, Andrew Hey, Sam Holland, ILYA, Stefan Johnson, Jens Jungkurth, Patrick Kehrier, Ian Kirkpatrick, Damien Lewis, Bill Malina, Manny Marroquin and Ricky Reed, engineers/mixers; Amy Allen, Daoud Anthony, Jonathan Bellion, Benjamin Levin, Thomas Brenneck, Christian Devivo, Omer Fedi, Eric Frederic, Ilya Salmanzadeh, Melissa Jefferson, Jordan K Johnson, Stefan Johnson, Kid Harpoon, Ian Kirkpatrick, Savan Kotecha, Max Martin, Nate Mercereau, Leon Michels, Nick Movshon, Michael Neil, Michael Pollack, Mark Ronson, Blake Slatkin, Peter Svensson, Gavin Chris Tennille, Theron Makiel Thomas, Andrew Wansel and Emily Warren, songwriters; Emerson Mancini, mastering engineer

Song of the Year

- **"Just Like That"**
  - **Bonnie Raitt, songwriter (Raitt)**
- "ABCDEFU"
  - Sara Davis, Gayle and Dave Pittenger, songwriters (Gayle)
- "About Damn Time"
  - Lizzo, Eric Frederic, Blake Slatkin and Theron Makiel Thomas, songwriters (Lizzo)
- "All Too Well (10 Minute Version) (The Short Film)"
  - Liz Rose and Taylor Swift, songwriters (Swift)
- "As It Was"
  - Tyler Johnson, Kid Harpoon and Harry Styles, songwriters (Styles)
- "Bad Habit"
  - Matthew Castellanos, Brittany Fousheé, Diana Gordon, John Carroll Kirby and Steve Lacy, songwriters (Lacy)
- "Break My Soul"
  - Beyoncé, S. Carter, Terius "The-Dream" Gesteelde-Diamant and Christopher A. Stewart, songwriters (Beyoncé)
- "Easy on Me"
  - Adele Adkins and Greg Kurstin, songwriters (Adele)
- "God Did"
  - Tarik Azzouz, E. Blackmon, Khaled Khaled, F. LeBlanc, Shawn Carter, John Stephens, Dwayne Carter, William Roberts and Nicholas Warwar, songwriters (DJ Khaled Featuring Rick Ross, Lil Wayne, Jay-Z, John Legend and Fridayy)
- "The Heart Part 5"
  - Jake Kosich, Johnny Kosich, Kendrick Lamar and Matt Schaeffer, songwriters (Lamar)

Best New Artist

- **Samara Joy**
- Anitta
- Omar Apollo
- Domi and JD Beck
- Latto
- Måneskin
- Muni Long
- Tobe Nwigwe
- Molly Tuttle
- Wet Leg

=== Pop ===
Best Pop Solo Performance

- **"Easy on Me" – Adele**
- "Moscow Mule" – Bad Bunny
- "Woman" – Doja Cat
- "Bad Habit" – Steve Lacy
- "About Damn Time" – Lizzo
- "As It Was" – Harry Styles

Best Pop Duo/Group Performance

- **"Unholy" – Sam Smith and Kim Petras**
- "Don't Shut Me Down" – ABBA
- "Bam Bam" – Camila Cabello featuring Ed Sheeran
- "My Universe" – Coldplay and BTS
- "I Like You (A Happier Song)" – Post Malone and Doja Cat

Best Traditional Pop Vocal Album

- **Higher – Michael Bublé**
- When Christmas Comes Around... – Kelly Clarkson
- I Dream of Christmas – Norah Jones
- Evergreen – Pentatonix
- Thank You – Diana Ross

Best Pop Vocal Album

- **Harry's House – Harry Styles**
- Voyage – ABBA
- 30 – Adele
- Music of the Spheres – Coldplay
- Special – Lizzo

=== Dance/Electronic ===
Best Dance/Electronic Recording

- **"Break My Soul" – Beyoncé**
  - **Beyoncé, Terius "The-Dream" Gesteelde-Diamant, Jens Christian Isaksen and Christopher "Tricky" Stewart, producers; Stuart White, mixer**
- "Rosewood" – Bonobo
  - Simon Green, producer; Simon Green, mixer
- "Don't Forget My Love" – Diplo and Miguel
  - Diplo and Maximilian Jaeger, producers; Luca Pretolesi, mixer
- "I'm Good (Blue)" – David Guetta and Bebe Rexha
  - David Guetta and Timofey Reznikov, producers; David Guetta and Timofey Reznikov, mixers
- "Intimidated" – Kaytranada featuring H.E.R.
  - H.E.R. and Kaytranada, producers; Kaytranada, mixer
- "On My Knees" – Rüfüs Du Sol
  - Jason Evigan and Rüfüs Du Sol, producers; Cassian Stewart-Kasimba, mixer

Best Dance/Electronic Album

- **Renaissance – Beyoncé**
- Fragments – Bonobo
- Diplo – Diplo
- The Last Goodbye – Odesza
- Surrender – Rüfüs Du Sol

=== Contemporary instrumental ===
Best Contemporary Instrumental Album

- **Empire Central – Snarky Puppy**
- Between Dreaming and Joy – Jeff Coffin
- Not Tight – Domi and JD Beck
- Blooz – Grant Geissman
- Jacob's Ladder – Brad Mehldau

=== Rock ===
Best Rock Performance

- **"Broken Horses" – Brandi Carlile**
- "So Happy It Hurts" – Bryan Adams
- "Old Man" – Beck
- "Wild Child" – The Black Keys
- "Crawl!" – Idles
- "Patient Number 9" – Ozzy Osbourne featuring Jeff Beck
- "Holiday"– Turnstile

Best Metal Performance

- **"Degradation Rules" – Ozzy Osbourne featuring Tony Iommi**
- "Call Me Little Sunshine" – Ghost
- "We'll Be Back" – Megadeth
- "Kill or Be Killed" – Muse
- "Blackout" – Turnstile

Best Rock Song

- **"Broken Horses"**
  - **Brandi Carlile, Phil and Tim Hanseroth, songwriters (Brandi Carlile)**
- "Black Summer"
  - Flea, John Frusciante, Anthony Kiedis and Chad Smith, songwriters (Red Hot Chili Peppers)
- "Blackout"
  - Brady Ebert, Daniel Fang, Franz Lyons, Pat McCrory and Brendan Yates, songwriters (Turnstile)
- "Harmonia's Dream"
  - Robbie Bennett and Adam Granduciel, songwriters (The War On Drugs)
- "Patient Number 9"
  - John Osbourne, Chad Smith, Ali Tamposi, Robert Trujillo and Andrew Wotman, songwriters (Ozzy Osbourne featuring Jeff Beck)

Best Rock Album

- **Patient Number 9 – Ozzy Osbourne**
- Dropout Boogie – The Black Keys
- The Boy Named If – Elvis Costello & The Imposters
- Crawler – Idles
- Mainstream Sellout – Machine Gun Kelly
- Lucifer on the Sofa – Spoon

=== Alternative ===
Best Alternative Music Performance

- **"Chaise Longue" – Wet Leg**
- "There'd Better Be a Mirrorball" – Arctic Monkeys
- "Certainty" – Big Thief
- "King" – Florence and the Machine
- "Spitting Off the Edge of the World" – Yeah Yeah Yeahs featuring Perfume Genius

Best Alternative Music Album

- **Wet Leg – Wet Leg**
- We – Arcade Fire
- Dragon New Warm Mountain I Believe in You – Big Thief
- Fossora – Björk
- Cool It Down – Yeah Yeah Yeahs

=== R&B ===
Best R&B Performance

- **"Hrs and Hrs" – Muni Long**
- "Virgo's Groove" – Beyoncé
- "Here With Me" – Mary J. Blige featuring Anderson .Paak
- "Over" – Lucky Daye
- "Hurt Me So Good" – Jazmine Sullivan

Best Traditional R&B Performance

- **"Plastic Off the Sofa" – Beyoncé**
- "Do 4 Love" – Snoh Aalegra
- "Good Morning Gorgeous" – Mary J. Blige
- "Keeps on Fallin'" – Babyface featuring Ella Mai
- "'Round Midnight" – Adam Blackstone featuring Jazmine Sullivan

Best R&B Song

- **"Cuff It"**
  - **Denisia "Blu June" Andrews, Beyoncé, Mary Christine Brockert, Brittany "Chi" Coney, Terius "The-Dream" Gesteelde-Diamant, Morten Ristorp, Nile Rodgers and Raphael Saadiq, songwriters (Beyoncé)**
- "Good Morning Gorgeous"
  - Mary J. Blige, David Brown, Dernst Emile II, Gabriella Wilson and Tiara Thomas, songwriters (Mary J. Blige)
- "Hrs and Hrs"
  - Hamadi Aaabi, Dylan Graham, Priscilla Renea, Thaddis "Kuk" Harrell, Brandon John-Baptiste, Isaac Wriston and Justin Nathaniel Zim, songwriters (Muni Long)
- "Hurt Me So Good"
  - Akeel Henry, Michael Holmes, Luca Mauti, Jazmine Sullivan and Elliott Trent, songwriters (Jazmine Sullivan)
- "Please Don't Walk Away"
  - PJ Morton, songwriter (PJ Morton)

Best Progressive R&B Album

- **Gemini Rights – Steve Lacy**
- Operation Funk – Cory Henry
- Drones – Terrace Martin
- Starfruit – Moonchild
- Red Balloon – Tank and the Bangas

Best R&B Album

- **Black Radio III – Robert Glasper**
- Good Morning Gorgeous (Deluxe) – Mary J. Blige
- Breezy (Deluxe) – Chris Brown
- Candydrip – Lucky Daye
- Watch the Sun – PJ Morton

=== Rap ===
Best Rap Performance

- **"The Heart Part 5" – Kendrick Lamar**
- "God Did" – DJ Khaled featuring Rick Ross, Lil Wayne, Jay-Z, John Legend and Fridayy
- "Vegas" – Doja Cat
- "Pushin P" – Gunna and Future featuring Young Thug
- "F.N.F. (Let's Go)" – Hitkidd and GloRilla

Best Melodic Rap Performance

- **"Wait for U" – Future featuring Drake and Tems**
- "Beautiful" – DJ Khaled featuring Future and SZA
- "First Class" – Jack Harlow
- "Die Hard" – Kendrick Lamar featuring Blxst and Amanda Reifer
- "Big Energy (Live)" – Latto

Best Rap Song

- **"The Heart Part 5"**
  - **Jake Kosich, Johnny Kosich, Kendrick Lamar and Matt Schaeffer, songwriters (Kendrick Lamar)**
- "Churchill Downs"
  - Ace G, BEDRM, Matthew Samuels, Tahrence Brown, Rogét Chahayed, Aubrey Graham, Jack Harlow and Jose Velazquez, songwriters (Jack Harlow featuring Drake)
- "God Did"
  - Tarik Azzouz, E. Blackmon, Khaled Khaled, F. LeBlanc, Shawn Carter, John Stephens, Dwayne Carter, William Roberts and Nicholas Warwar, songwriters (DJ Khaled featuring Rick Ross, Lil Wayne, Jay-Z, John Legend and Fridayy)
- "Pushin P"
  - Lucas Depante, Nayvadius Wilburn, Sergio Kitchens, Wesley Tyler Glass and Jeffery Lamar Williams, songwriters (Gunna and Future featuring Young Thug)
- "Wait for U"
  - Tejiri Akpoghene, Floyd E. Bentley III, Jacob Canady, Isaac De Boni, Aubrey Graham, Israel Ayomide Fowobaje, Nayvadius Wilburn, Michael Mule, Oluwatoroti Oke and Temilade Openiyi, songwriters (Future featuring Drake and Tems)

Best Rap Album

- **Mr. Morale & the Big Steppers – Kendrick Lamar**
- God Did – DJ Khaled
- I Never Liked You – Future
- Come Home the Kids Miss You – Jack Harlow
- It's Almost Dry – Pusha T

=== Country ===
Best Country Solo Performance

- **"Live Forever"** – **Willie Nelson**
- "Heartfirst" – Kelsea Ballerini
- "Something in the Orange" – Zach Bryan
- "In His Arms" – Miranda Lambert
- "Circles Around This Town" – Maren Morris

Best Country Duo/Group Performance

- **"Never Wanted to Be That Girl"– Carly Pearce and Ashley McBryde**
- "Wishful Drinking" – Ingrid Andress and Sam Hunt
- "Midnight Rider's Prayer" – Brothers Osborne
- "Outrunnin' Your Memory" – Luke Combs and Miranda Lambert
- "Does He Love You (Revisited)" – Reba McEntire and Dolly Parton
- "Going Where The Lonely Go" – Robert Plant and Alison Krauss

Best Country Song

- **"'Til You Can't"**
  - **Matt Rogers and Ben Stennis, songwriters (Cody Johnson)**
- "Circles Around This Town"
  - Ryan Hurd, Julia Michaels, Maren Morris and Jimmy Robbins, songwriters (Maren Morris)
- "Doin' This"
  - Luke Combs, Drew Parker and Robert Williford, songwriters (Luke Combs)
- "I Bet You Think About Me (Taylor's Version) (From The Vault)"
  - Lori McKenna and Taylor Swift, songwriters (Taylor Swift featuring Chris Stapleton)
- "If I Was a Cowboy"
  - Jesse Frasure and Miranda Lambert, songwriters (Miranda Lambert)
- "I'll Love You Till The Day I Die"
  - Rodney Crowell and Chris Stapleton, songwriters (Willie Nelson)

Best Country Album

- **A Beautiful Time – Willie Nelson**
- Growin' Up – Luke Combs
- Palomino – Miranda Lambert
- Ashley McBryde Presents: Lindeville – Ashley McBryde
- Humble Quest – Maren Morris

=== New Age ===
Best New Age, Ambient or Chant Album

- **Mystic Mirror – White Sun**
- Positano Songs – Will Ackerman
- Joy – Paul Avgerinos
- Mantra Americana – Madi Das and Dave Stringer with Bhakti Without Borders
- The Passenger – Cheryl B. Engelhardt

=== Jazz ===
Best Improvised Jazz Solo

- **"Endangered Species" – Wayne Shorter and Leo Genovese**
- "Rounds (Live)" – Ambrose Akinmusire
- "Keep Holding On" – Gerald Albright
- "Falling" – Melissa Aldana
- "Call of the Drum" – Marcus Baylor
- "Cherokee/Koko" – John Beasley

Best Jazz Vocal Album

- **Linger Awhile – Samara Joy**
- The Evening: Live at Apparatus – The Baylor Project
- Fade to Black – Carmen Lundy
- Fifty – The Manhattan Transfer with The WDR Funkhausorchester
- Ghost Song – Cécile McLorin Salvant

Best Jazz Instrumental Album

- **New Standards Vol. 1 – Terri Lyne Carrington, Kris Davis, Linda May Han Oh, Nicholas Payton and Matthew Stevens**
- Live in Italy – Peter Erskine Trio
- LongGone – Joshua Redman, Brad Mehldau, Christian McBride, and Brian Blade
- Live at the Detroit Jazz Festival – Wayne Shorter, Terri Lyne Carrington, Leo Genovese and Esperanza Spalding
- Parallel Motion – Yellowjackets

Best Large Jazz Ensemble Album

- **Generation Gap Jazz Orchestra – Steven Feifke, Bijon Watson, Generation Gap Jazz Orchestra**
- Bird Lives – John Beasley, Magnus Lindgren and SWR Big Band
- Remembering Bob Freedman – Ron Carter and The Jazzaar Festival Big Band directed by Christian Jacob
- Center Stage – Steve Gadd, Eddie Gómez, Ronnie Cuber and WDR Big Band conducted by Michael Abene
- Architecture of Storms – Remy Le Boeuf's Assembly of Shadows

Best Latin Jazz Album

- **Fandango at the Wall in New York – Arturo O'Farrill and The Afro Latin Jazz Orchestra featuring The Congra Patria Son Jarocho Collective**
- Crisálida – Danilo Pérez featuring The Global Messengers
- If You Will – Flora Purim
- Rhythm & Soul – Arturo Sandoval
- Música de las Américas – Miguel Zenón

=== Gospel/contemporary Christian ===
Best Gospel Performance/Song

- **"Kingdom"** – **Maverick City Music** and **Kirk Franklin**
  - **Kirk Franklin, Jonathan Jay, Chandler Moore and Jacob Poole, songwriters**
- "Positive" – Erica Campbell
  - Erica Campbell, Warryn Campbell and Juan Winans, songwriters
- "When I Pray" – DOE
  - Dominique Jones and Dewitt Jones, songwriters
- "The Better Benediction" – PJ Morton featuring Zacardi Cortez, Gene Moore, Samoht, Tim Rogers and Darrel Walls
  - PJ Morton, songwriter
- "Get Up" – Tye Tribbett
  - Brandon Jones, Christopher Michael Stevens, Thaddaeus Tribbett and Tye Tribbett, songwriters

Best Contemporary Christian Music Performance/Song

- **"Fear Is Not My Future" – Maverick City Music and Kirk Franklin**
  - **Kirk Franklin, Nicole Hannel, Jonathan Jay, Brandon Lake and Hannah Shackelford, songwriters**
- "God Really Loves Us (Radio Version)" – Crowder featuring Dante Bowe and Maverick City Music
  - Dante Bowe, David Crowder, Ben Glover and Jeff Sojka, songwriters
- "So Good" – DOE
  - Chuck Butler, Dominique Jones and Ethan Hulse, songwriters
- "For God Is with Us" – For King & Country and Hillary Scott
  - Josh Kerr, Jordan Reynolds, Joel Smallbone and Luke Smallbone, songwriters
- "Holy Forever" – Chris Tomlin
  - Jason Ingram, Brian Johnson, Jenn Johnson, Chris Tomlin and Phil Wickham, songwriters
- "Hymn of Heaven (Radio Version)" – Phil Wickham
  - Chris Davenport, Bill Johnson, Brian Johnson and Phil Wickham, songwriters

Best Gospel Album

- **Kingdom Book One Deluxe – Maverick City Music and Kirk Franklin**
- Die To Live – Maranda Curtis
- Breakthrough: The Exodus (Live) – Ricky Dillard
- Clarity – DOE
- All Things New – Tye Tribbett

Best Contemporary Christian Music Album

- **Breathe – Maverick City Music**
- Lion – Elevation Worship
- Life After Death – TobyMac
- Always – Chris Tomlin
- My Jesus – Anne Wilson

Best Roots Gospel Album

- **The Urban Hymnal – Tennessee State University Marching Band**
- Let's Just Praise the Lord – Gaither Vocal Band
- Confessio – Irish American Roots – Keith & Kristyn Getty
- The Willie Nelson Family – Willie Nelson
- 2:22 – Karen Peck and New River

=== Latin ===
Best Latin Pop Album

- **Pasieros – Rubén Blades and Boca Livre**
- Aguilera – Christina Aguilera
- De adentro pa afuera – Camilo
- Viajante – Fonseca
- Dharma + – Sebastián Yatra

Best Música Urbana Album

- **Un verano sin ti – Bad Bunny**
- Trap Cake, Vol. 2 – Rauw Alejandro
- Legendaddy – Daddy Yankee
- La 167 – Farruko
- The Love & Sex Tape – Maluma

Best Latin Rock or Alternative Album

- **Motomami – Rosalía**
- El Alimento – Cimafunk
- Tinta y tiempo – Jorge Drexler
- 1940 Carmen – Mon Laferte
- Alegoría – Gaby Moreno
- Los Años Salvajes – Fito Páez

Best Regional Mexican Music Album (Including Tejano)

- **Un Canto por México – El Musical – Natalia Lafourcade**
- Abeja Reina – Chiquis
- La Reunión (Deluxe) – Los Tigres del Norte
- EP #1 Forajido – Christian Nodal
- Qué Ganas de Verte (Deluxe) – Marco Antonio Solís

Best Tropical Latin Album

- **Pa'llá voy – Marc Anthony**
- Quiero Verte Feliz – La Santa Cecilia
- Lado A lado B – Víctor Manuelle
- Legendario – Tito Nieves
- Imágenes Latinas – Spanish Harlem Orchestra
- Cumbiana II – Carlos Vives

=== American roots ===
Best American Roots Performance

- **"Stompin' Ground" – Aaron Neville with The Dirty Dozen Brass Band**
- "Someday It'll All Make Sense (Bluegrass Version)" – Bill Anderson featuring Dolly Parton
- "Life According to Raechel" – Madison Cunningham
- "Oh Betty" – Fantastic Negrito
- "Prodigal Daughter" – Aoife O'Donovan and Allison Russell

Best Americana Performance

- **"Made Up Mind" – Bonnie Raitt**
- "Silver Moon [A Tribute to Michael Nesmith]" – Eric Alexandrakis
- "There You Go Again" – Asleep at the Wheel featuring Lyle Lovett
- "The Message" – Blind Boys of Alabama featuring Black Violin
- "You and Me on the Rock" – Brandi Carlile featuring Lucius

Best American Roots Song

- **"Just Like That"**
  - **Bonnie Raitt, songwriter (Raitt)**
- "Bright Star"
  - Anaïs Mitchell, songwriter (Mitchell)
- "Forever"
  - Sheryl Crow and Jeff Trott, songwriters (Sheryl Crow)
- "High and Lonesome"
  - T Bone Burnett and Robert Plant, songwriters (Robert Plant and Alison Krauss)
- "Prodigal Daughter"
  - Tim O'Brien and Aoife O'Donovan, songwriters (Aoife O'Donovan and Allison Russell)
- "You and Me on the Rock"
  - Brandi Carlile, Phil Hanseroth and Tim Hanseroth, songwriters (Brandi Carlile featuring Lucius)

Best Americana Album

- **In These Silent Days – Brandi Carlile**
- Things Happen That Way – Dr. John
- Good to Be... – Keb' Mo'
- Raise the Roof – Robert Plant and Alison Krauss
- Just Like That... – Bonnie Raitt

Best Bluegrass Album

- **Crooked Tree – Molly Tuttle and Golden Highway**
- Toward the Fray – The Infamous Stringdusters
- Almost Proud – The Del McCoury Band
- Calling You from My Mountain – Peter Rowan
- Get Yourself Outside – Yonder Mountain String Band

Best Traditional Blues Album

- **Get On Board – Taj Mahal and Ry Cooder**
- Heavy Load Blues – Gov't Mule
- The Blues Don't Lie – Buddy Guy
- The Sun Is Shining Down – John Mayall
- Mississippi Son – Charlie Musselwhite

Best Contemporary Blues Album

- **Brother Johnny – Edgar Winter**
- Done Come Too Far – Shemekia Copeland
- Crown – Eric Gales
- Bloodline Maintenance – Ben Harper
- Set Sail – North Mississippi Allstars

Best Folk Album

- **Revealer – Madison Cunningham**
- Spellbound – Judy Collins
- The Light at the End of the Line – Janis Ian
- Age of Apathy – Aoife O'Donovan
- Hell on Church Street – Punch Brothers

Best Regional Roots Music Album

- **Live at the 2022 New Orleans Jazz & Heritage Festival** – **Ranky Tanky**
- Full Circle – Sean Ardoin and Kreole Rock and Soul featuring LSU Golden Band from Tigerland
- Natalie Noelani – Natalie Ai Kamauu
- Halau Hula Keali'i O Nalani - Live at the Getty Center – Halau Hula Keali'i O Nalani
- Lucky Man – Nathan & The Zydeco Cha Chas

=== Reggae ===
Best Reggae Album

- **The Kalling – Kabaka Pyramid**
- Gifted – Koffee
- Scorcha – Sean Paul
- Third Time's the Charm – Protoje
- Com Fly Wid Mi – Shaggy

=== Global ===
Best Global Music Performance

- **"Bayethe" – Wouter Kellerman, Zakes Bantwini and Nomcebo Zikode**
- "Udhero Na" – Arooj Aftab and Anoushka Shankar
- "Gimme Love" – Matt B and Eddy Kenzo
- "Last Last" – Burna Boy
- "Neva Bow Down" – Rocky Dawuni featuring Blvk H3ro

Best Global Music Album

- **Sakura – Masa Takumi**
- Shuruaat – Berklee Indian Ensemble
- Love, Damini – Burna Boy
- Queen of Sheba – Angélique Kidjo and Ibrahim Maalouf
- Between Us... (Live) – Anoushka Shankar, Metropole Orkest and Jules Buckley featuring Manu Delago

=== Children's ===
Best Children's Album

- **The Movement – Alphabet Rockers**
- Ready Set Go! – Divinity Roxx
- Space Cadet – Justin Roberts
- Los Fabulosos – Lucky Diaz and the Family Jam Band
- Into the Little Blue House – Wendy and DB

=== Spoken word ===
Best Audio Book, Narration & Storytelling Recording

- **Finding Me** – **Viola Davis**
- Act Like You Got Some Sense – Jamie Foxx
- Aristotle and Dante Dive into the Waters of the World – Lin-Manuel Miranda
- All About Me!: My Remarkable Life in Show Business – Mel Brooks
- Music Is History – Questlove

Best Spoken Word Poetry Album

- **The Poet Who Sat by the Door – J. Ivy**
- Black Men Are Precious – Ethelbert Miller
- Call Us What We Carry: Poems – Amanda Gorman
- Hiding in Plain View – Malcolm-Jamal Warner
- You Will Be Someone's Ancestor. Act Accordingly. – Amir Sulaiman

=== Comedy ===
Best Comedy Album

- **The Closer** – **Dave Chappelle**
- Comedy Monster – Jim Gaffigan
- A Little Brains, A Little Talent – Randy Rainbow
- Sorry – Louis C.K.
- We All Scream – Patton Oswalt

=== Musical theater ===
Best Musical Theater Album

- **Into The Woods (2022 Broadway Cast Recording) – Sara Bareilles, Brian D'Arcy James, Patina Miller and Phillipa Soo, principal soloists; Rob Berman and Sean Patrick Flahaven, producers; Stephen Sondheim, composer/lyricist (2022 Broadway Cast)**
- Caroline, or Change – John Cariani, Sharon D. Clarke, Caissie Levy and Samantha Williams, principal soloists; Van Dean, Nicel Lilley, Lawrence Manchester, Elliott Scheiner and Jeanine Tesori, producers; Jeanine Tesori, composers; Tony Kushner, lyricists (New Broadway Cast)
- MJ The Musical – Myles Frost and Tavon Olds-Sample, principal soloists; David Holcenberg, Derik Lee and Jason Michael Webb, producers (Original Broadway Cast)
- Mr. Saturday Night – Shoshana Bean, Billy Crystal, Randy Graff and David Paymer, principal soloists; Jason Robert Brown, Sean Patrick Flahaven and Jeffrey Lesser, producers; Jason Robert Brown, composer; Amanda Green, lyricist (Original Broadway Cast)
- Six: Live on Opening Night – Joe Beighton, Tom Curran, Sam Featherstone, Paul Gatehouse, Toby Marlow and Lucy Moss, producers; Toby Marlow and Lucy Moss, composers/lyricists (Original Broadway Cast)
- A Strange Loop – Jaquel Spivey, principal soloist; Michael Croiter, Michael R. Jackson, Charlie Rosen and Rona Siddiqui, producers; Michael R. Jackson, composer/lyricist (Original Broadway Cast)

=== Visual media ===
Best Compilation Soundtrack for Visual Media

- **Encanto – Various Artists**
- Elvis – Various Artists
- Stranger Things: Music from the Netflix Original Series, Season 4 (Vol. 2) – Various Artists
- Top Gun: Maverick – Lorne Balfe, Harold Faltermeyer, Lady Gaga and Hans Zimmer
- West Side Story – Various Artists

Best Score Soundtrack for Visual Media

- **Encanto – Germaine Franco**
- No Time to Die – Hans Zimmer
- The Power of the Dog – Jonny Greenwood
- The Batman – Michael Giacchino
- Succession: Season 3 – Nicholas Britell

Best Score Soundtrack for Video Games and Other Interactive Media

- **Assassin's Creed Valhalla: Dawn of Ragnarök – Stephanie Economou**
- Aliens: Fireteam Elite – Austin Wintory
- Call of Duty: Vanguard – Bear McCreary
- Old World – Christopher Tin
- Marvel's Guardians of the Galaxy – Richard Jacques

Best Song Written for Visual Media

- **"We Don't Talk About Bruno" (from Encanto)**
  - **Lin-Manuel Miranda, songwriter (Carolina Gaitán - La Gaita, Mauro Castillo, Adassa, Rhenzy Feliz, Diane Guerrero, Stephanie Beatriz and Encanto Cast)**
- "Be Alive" (from King Richard)
  - Beyoncé and Darius Scott, songwriters (Beyoncé)
- "Carolina" (from Where the Crawdads Sing)
  - Taylor Swift, songwriter (Swift)
- "Hold My Hand" (from Top Gun: Maverick)
  - BloodPop and Lady Gaga, songwriters (Lady Gaga)
- "Keep Rising" (from The Woman King)
  - Angelique Kidjo, Jeremy Lutito and Jessy Wilson, songwriters (Jessy Wilson featuring Angelique Kidjo)
- "Nobody Like U" (from Turning Red)
  - Billie Eilish and Finneas O'Connell, songwriters (4*Town, Jordan Fisher, Finneas O'Connell, Josh Levi, Topher Ngo, Grayson Villanueva)

=== Composition and arrangement ===
Best Instrumental Composition

- **"Refuge"**
  - **Geoffrey Keezer, composer (Geoffrey Keezer)**
- "African Tales"
  - Paquito D'Rivera, composer (Tasha Warren and Dave Eggar)
- "El País Invisible"
  - Miguel Zenón, composer (Miguel Zenón, José Antonio Zayas Cabán, Ryan Smith and Casey Rafn)
- "Fronteras (Borders) Suite: Al-Musafir Blues"
  - Danilo Pérez, composer (Danilo Pérez featuring The Global Messengers)
- "Snapshots"
  - Pascal Le Boeuf, composer (Tasha Warren and Dave Eggar)

Best Arrangement, Instrumental or A Cappella

- **"Scrapple From The Apple"**
  - **John Beasley, arranger (Magnus Lindgren, John Beasly & The SWR Big Band Featuring Martin Auer)**
- "As Days Go By (An Arrangement of The Family Matters Theme Song)"
  - Armand Hutton, arranger (Armand Hutton Featuring Terrell Hunt and Just 6)
- "How Deep Is Your Love"
  - Matt Cusson, arranger (Kings Return)
- "Main Titles (Doctor Strange in the Multiverse of Madness)"
  - Danny Elfman, arranger (Danny Elfman)
- "Minnesota, WI"
  - Remy Le Boeuf, arranger (Remy Le Boeuf)

Best Arrangement, Instruments and Vocals

- **"Songbird (Orchestral Version)"**
  - **Vince Mendoza, arranger (Christine McVie)**
- "Let It Happen"
  - Louis Cole, arranger (Louis Cole)
- "Never Gonna Be Alone"
  - Jacob Collier, arranger (Jacob Collier featuring Lizzy McAlpine and John Mayer)
- "Optimistic Voices / No Love Dying"
  - Cécile McLorin Salvant, arranger (Cécile McLorin Salvant)
- "2 + 2 = 5 (Arr. Nathan Schram)"
  - Nathan Schram and Becca Stevens, arrangers (Becca Stevens and Attacca Quartet)

=== Package, notes and historical ===
Best Recording Package

- **Beginningless Beginning**
  - Chun-Tien Hsia and Qing-Yang Xiao, art directors (Tamsui-Kavalan Chinese Orchestra)
- Divers
  - William Stichter, art director (Soporus)
- Everything Was Beautiful
  - Mark Farrow, art director (Spiritualized)
- Telos
  - Ming Liu, art director (Fann)
- Voyeurist
  - Tnsn Dvsn, art director (Underoath)

Best Boxed or Special Limited Edition Package

- **In and Out of the Garden: Madison Square Garden '81, '82, '83**
  - Lisa Glines, Doran Tyson and Dave Van Patten, art directors (Grateful Dead)
- Artists Inspired By Music: Interscope Reimagined
  - Josh Abraham, Steve Berman, Jimmy Iovine, John Janick and Jason Sangerman, art directors (Various Artists)
- Big Mess
  - Berit Gwendolyn Gilma, art director (Danny Elfman)
- Black Pumas (Collector's Edition Box Set)
  - Jenna Krackenberger, Anna McCaleb and Preacher, art directors (Black Pumas)
- Book
  - Paul Sahre, art director (They Might Be Giants)

Best Album Notes

- **Yankee Hotel Foxtrot (20th Anniversary Super Deluxe Edition)**
  - **Bob Mehr, album notes writer (Wilco)**
- The American Clavé Recordings
  - Fernando González, album notes writer (Astor Piazzolla)
- Andy Irvine and Paul Brady
  - Gareth Murphy, album notes writer (Andy Irvine and Paul Brady)
- Harry Partch, 1942
  - John Schneider, album notes writer (Harry Partch)
- Life's Work: A Retrospective
  - Ted Olson, album notes writer (Doc Watson)

Best Historical Album

- **Yankee Hotel Foxtrot (20th Anniversary Super Deluxe Edition)**
  - **Cheryl Pawelski and Jeff Tweedy, compilation producers; Bob Ludwig, mastering engineer (Wilco)**
- Against The Odds: 1974-1982
  - Tommy Manzi, Steve Rosenthal and Ken Shipley, compilation producers; Michael Graves, mastering engineer; Tom Camuso, restoration engineer (Blondie)
- The Goldberg Variations - The Complete Unreleased 1981 Studio Sessions
  - Robert Russ, compilation producer; Martin Kistner, mastering engineer (Glenn Gould)
- Life's Work: A Retrospective
  - Scott Billington, Ted Olson and Mason Williams, compilation producers; Paul Blakemore, mastering engineer (Doc Watson)
- To Whom It May Concern...
  - Jonathan Sklute, compilation producer; Kevin Marques Moo, mastering engineer; Lucas MacFadden, restoration engineer (Freestyle Fellowship)

=== Production ===
Best Engineered Album, Non-Classical

- **Harry's House**
  - **Jeremy Hatcher, Oli Jacobs, Nick Lobel, Spike Stent and Sammy Witte, engineers; Randy Merrill, mastering engineer (Harry Styles)**
- Adolescence
  - Yonatan (Yoni) Ayal, Maxwell Byrne, Patrick Liney, Tim Nelson, Jock Nowell-Usticke, Aidan Peterson, Pierre Luc Rioux, Ike Schultz, Rutger Van Woudenberg, George Nicholas and Ryan Schwabe, engineers; Ryan Schwabe, mastering engineer (Baynk)
- Black Radio III
  - Daniel Farris, Tiffany Gouché, Keith Lewis, Musiq Soulchild, Reginald Nicholas, Q-Tip, Amir Sulaiman, Michael Law Thomas and Jon Zacks, engineers; Chris Athens, mastering engineer (Robert Glasper)
- Chloë and the Next 20th Century
  - Dave Cerminara and Jonathan Wilson, engineers; Adam Ayan, mastering engineer (Father John Misty)
- Wet Leg
  - Jon McMullen, Joshua Mobaraki, Alan Moulder and Alexis Smith, engineers; Matt Colton, mastering engineer (Wet Leg)

Producer of the Year, Non-Classical

- **Jack Antonoff**
  - "All Too Well (10 Minute Version) (Taylor's Version) (From The Vault)" (Taylor Swift) (T)
  - Dance Fever (Florence + The Machine) (A)
  - "I Still Believe" (Diana Ross) (T)
  - Minions: The Rise Of Gru (Various Artists) (A)
  - "Part of the Band" (The 1975) (S)
- Dan Auerbach
  - Dropout Boogie (The Black Keys) (A)
  - El Bueno y el Malo (Hermanos Gutiérrez) (T)
  - Nightmare Daydream (The Velveteers) (A)
  - Rich White Honky Blues (Hank Williams Jr.) (A)
  - Something Borrowed, Something New: A Tribute to John Anderson (Various Artists) (A)
  - Strange Time to Be Alive (Early James) (A)
  - Sweet Unknown (Ceramic Animal) (A)
  - "Tres Hermanos" (Hermanos Gutiérrez) (T)
  - Young Blood (Marcus King) (A)
- Boi-1da
  - "Chronicles" (Cordae featuring H.E.R. and Lil Durk) (T)
  - "Churchill Downs" (Jack Harlow featuring Drake) (T)
  - "Heated" (Beyoncé) (T)
  - "Mafia" (Travis Scott) (S)
  - "N95" (Kendrick Lamar) (T)
  - "Nail Tech" (Jack Harlow) (T)
  - "Not Another Love Song" (Ella Mai) (T)
  - "Scarred" (Giveon) (T)
  - "Silent Hill" (Kendrick Lamar) (T)
- Dahi
  - "Buttons" (Steve Lacy) (T)
  - "Count Me Out" (Kendrick Lamar) (T)
  - "Die Hard" (Kendrick Lamar) (T)
  - "DJ Quik" (Vince Staples) (T)
  - "Father Time" (Kendrick Lamar featuring Sampha) (T)
  - "Give You the World" (Steve Lacy) (T)
  - "Mercury" (Steve Lacy) (T)
  - "Mirror" (Kendrick Lamar) (T)
  - "Rich Spirit" (Kendrick Lamar) (T)
- Dernst "D'Mile" Emile II
  - Candy Drip (Lucky Daye) (A)
  - An Evening with Silk Sonic (Bruno Mars, Anderson .Paak and Silk Sonic) (A)
  - Good Morning Gorgeous (Mary J. Blige) (S)
  - "Sometimes I Feel Like a Motherless Child" (Jazmine Sullivan) (S)

Best Remixed Recording, Non-Classical

- **"About Damn Time" (Purple Disco Machine Remix)**
  - **Purple Disco Machine, remixer (Lizzo)**
- "Break My Soul" (Terry Hunter Remix)
  - Terry Hunter, remixer (Beyoncé)
- "Easy Lover" (Four Tet Remix)
  - Four Tet, remixer (Ellie Goulding)
- "Slow Song" (Paul Woolford Remix)
  - Paul Woolford, remixer (The Knocks and Dragonette)
- "Too Late Now" (Soulwax Remix)
  - Soulwax, remixer (Wet Leg)

Best Immersive Audio Album

- **Divine Tides**
  - **Eric Schilling, immersive mix engineer; Stewart Copeland, Ricky Kej and Herbert Waltl, immersive producers (Stewart Copeland and Ricky Kej)**
- Aguilera
  - Jaycen Joshua, immersive mix engineer; Jaycen Joshua, immersive mastering engineer (Christina Aguilera)
- Memories...Do Not Open
  - Mike Piacentini, immersive mix engineer; Mike Piacentini, immersive mastering engineer; Adam Alpert, Alex Pall, Jordan Stilwell and Andrew Taggart, immersive producers (The Chainsmokers)
- Picturing the Invisible - Focus 1
  - Jim Anderson, immersive mix engineer; Morten Lindberg and Ulrike Schwarz, immersive mastering engineers; Jane Ira Bloom and Ulrike Schwarz, immersive producers (Jane Ira Bloom)
- Tuvayhun — Beatitudes For a Wounded World
  - Morten Lindberg, immersive mix engineer; Morten Lindberg, immersive mastering engineer; Morten Lindberg, immersive producer (Nidarosdomens Jentekor and Trondheim Soloists)

Best Engineered Album, Classical

- **Bates: Philharmonia Fantastique - The Making of the Orchestra**
  - **Shawn Murphy, Charlie Post and Gary Rydstrom, engineers; Michael Romanowski, mastering engineer (Edwin Outwater and Chicago Symphony Orchestra)**
- Beethoven: Symphony No. 6; Stucky: Silent Spring
  - Mark Donahue, engineer; Mark Donahue, mastering engineer (Manfred Honeck and Pittsburgh Symphony Orchestra)
- Perspectives
  - Jonathan Lackey, Bill Maylone and Dan Nichols, engineers; Joe Lambert, mastering engineer (Third Coast Percussion)
- Tuvayhun - Beatitudes for a Wounded World
  - Morten Lindberg, engineer; Morten Lindberg, mastering engineer (Anita Brevik, Nidarosdomens Jentekor and Trondheim Soloists)
- Williams: Violin Concerto No. 2 & Selected Film Themes
  - Bernhard Güttler, Shawn Murphy and Nick Squire, engineers; Christoph Stickel, mastering engineer (Anne-Sophie Mutter, John Williams and Boston Symphony Orchestra)

Producer of the Year, Classical

- **Judith Sherman**
  - Akiho: Oculus (Various Artists) (A)
  - Bach, C.P.E.: Sonatas & Rondos (Marc-André Hamelin) (A)
  - Bolcom: The Complete Rags (Marc-André Hamelin) (A)
  - Felix & Fanny Mendelssohn: String Quartets (Takács Quartet) (A)
  - Huang Ro's A Dust in Time (Del Sol Quartet) (A)
  - It Feels Like (Eunbi Kim) (A)
  - León: Teclas de Mi Piano (Adam Kent) (A)
  - Violin Odyssey (Itamar Zorman and Ieva Jokubaviciute) (A)
  - Works By Florence Price, Jessie Montgomery, Valerie Coleman (Michael Repper and New York Youth Symphony) (A)
- Jonathan Allen
  - Aspire (Seunghee Lee, JP Jofre, Enrico Fagone and London Symphony Orchestra) (A)
  - Cooper: Continuum (Jessica Cottis, Adjoah Andoh, Clio Gould and the Oculus Ensemble) (A)
  - Muse (Sheku Kanneh-Mason and Isata Kanneh-Mason) (A)
  - Origins (Lucie Horsch) (A)
  - Saudade (Plinio Fernandes) (A)
  - Schubert: Winterreise (Benjamin Appl) (A)
  - Secret Love Letters (Lisa Batiashvili, Yannick Nézet-Séguin and Philadelphia Orchestra) (A)
  - Song (Sheku Kanneh-Mason) (A)
- Christoph Franke
  - Brahms & Berg: Violin Concertos (Christian Tetzlaff, Robin Ticciati and Deutsches Symphonie-Orchester Berlin) (A)
  - John Williams - The Berlin Concert (John Williams and Berliner Philharmoniker) (A)
  - Mendelssohn: Piano Concertos (Lars Vogt and the Orchestre de chambre de Paris) (A)
  - Mozart: Complete Piano Sonatas (Elisabeth Leonskaja) (A)
  - Mozart Y Mambo: Cuban Dances (Sarah Willis, José Antonio Méndez Padrón and Havana Lyceum Orchestra) (A)
- James Ginsburg
  - As We Are (Julian Velasco) (A)
  - Avant L'Orage - French String Trios (Black Oak Ensemble) (A)
  - Gems from Armenia (Aznavoorian Duo) (A)
  - Stephenson: Symphony No. 3, 'Visions' (Vladimir Kulenovic and Lake Forest Symphony) (A)
  - Trios from Contemporary Chicago (Lincoln Trio) (A)
  - When There Are No Words - Revolutionary Works for Oboe and Piano (Alex Klein and Phillip Bush) (A)
- Elaine Martone
  - Beethoven: The Last Sonatas (Gerardo Teissonnière) (A)
  - Big Things (Icarus Quartet) (A)
  - Perspectives (Third Coast Percussion) (A)
  - Schnittke: Concerto for Piano and Strings; Prokofiev: Symphony No. 2 (Yefim Bronfman, Franz Welser-Möst and the Cleveland Orchestra) (A)
  - Strauss: Three Tone Poems (Franz Welser-Möst and the Cleveland Orchestra) (A)
  - Upon Further Reflection (John Wilson) (A)

=== Songwriting ===
Songwriter of the Year, Non-Classical Performers names appear in parentheses.

- **Tobias Jesso Jr.**
  - Boyfriends (Harry Styles) (T)
  - Can I Get It (Adele) (T)
  - Careless (FKA Twigs featuring Daniel Caesar) (T)
  - C'mon Baby Cry (Orville Peck) (T)
  - Dotted Lines (King Princess) (T)
  - Let You Go (Diplo With TSHA featuring Kareen Lomax) (S)
  - No Good Reason (Omar Apollo) (T)
  - Thank You Song (FKA Twigs) (T)
  - To Be Loved (Adele) (T)
- Amy Allen
  - For My Friends (King Princess) (S)
  - The Hardest Part (Alexander 23) (S)
  - If We Were A Party (Alexander 23) (S)
  - If You Love Me (Lizzo) (T)
  - Magic Wand (Alexander 23) (T)
  - Matilda (Harry Styles) (T)
  - Move Me (Charli XCX) (T)
  - Too Bad (King Princess) (S)
  - Vicious (Sabrina Carpenter) (S)
- Nija Charles
  - Cozy (Beyoncé) (T)
  - Ex For A Reason (Summer Walker With JT from City Girls) (T)
  - Good Love (City Girls featuring Usher) (S)
  - IYKYK (Lil Durk featuring Ella Mai and A Boogie wit da Hoodie) (T)
  - Lobby (Anitta and Missy Elliott) (S)
  - Ride For You (Meek Mill featuring Kehlani) (T)
  - Sweetest Pie (Megan Thee Stallion and Dua Lipa) (S)
  - Tangerine (Kehlani) (T)
  - Throw It Away (Summer Walker) (T)
- The-Dream
  - Break My Soul (Beyoncé) (S)
  - Church Girl (Beyoncé) (T)
  - Energy (Beyoncé featuring Beam) (T)
  - I'm That Girl (Beyoncé) (T)
  - Mercedes (Brent Faiyaz) (S)
  - Rock N Roll (Pusha T featuring Kanye West and Kid Cudi) (T)
  - Rolling Stone (Brent Faiyaz) (T)
  - Summer Renaissance (Beyoncé) (T)
  - Thique (Beyoncé) (T)
- Laura Veltz
  - Background Music (Maren Morris) (T)
  - Feed (Demi Lovato) (T)
  - Humble Quest (Maren Morris) (T)
  - Pain (Ingrid Andress) (T)
  - 29 (Demi Lovato) (T)

=== Classical ===
Best Orchestral Performance

- **"Works by Florence Price, Jessie Montgomery, Valerie Coleman"**
  - **New York Youth Symphony and Michael Repper**
- "John Williams: The Berlin Concert"
  - Berlin Philharmonic and John Williams
- "Dvořák: Symphonies Nos. 7-9"
  - Los Angeles Philharmonic and Gustavo Dudamel
- "Sila: The Breath of the World"
  - Various Artists
- "Stay on It"
  - Wild Up and Christopher Rountree

Best Opera Recording

- **Blanchard: Fire Shut Up In My Bones**
  - **Yannick Nézet-Séguin, conductor; Angel Blue, Will Liverman, Latonia Moore and Walter Russell III; David Frost, producer (The Metropolitan Opera Orchestra; The Metropolitan Opera Chorus)**
- Aucoin: Eurydice
  - Yannick Nézet-Séguin, conductor; Barry Banks, Nathan Berg, Joshua Hopkins, Erin Morley and Jakub Józef Orliński; David Frost, producer (The Metropolitan Opera Orchestra; The Metropolitan Opera Chorus)
- Davis: X - The Life And Times Of Malcolm X
  - Gil Rose, conductor; Joshua Conyers, Ronnita Miller, Whitney Morrison, Victor Robertson and Davóne Tines; Gil Rose, producer (Boston Modern Orchestra Project; Odyssey Opera Chorus)

Best Choral Performance

- **Born**
  - **Donald Nally, conductor (Dominic German, Maren Montalbano, Rebecca Myers and James Reese; The Crossing)**
- Bach: St. John Passion
  - John Eliot Gardiner, conductor (English Baroque Soloists; Monteverdi Choir)
- Verdi: Requiem - The Met Remembers 9/11
  - Yannick Nézet-Séguin, conductor; Donald Palumbo, chorus master (Michelle DeYoung, Eric Owens, Ailyn Pérez and Matthew Polenzani; The Metropolitan Opera Orchestra; The Metropolitan Opera Chorus)

Best Chamber Music/Small Ensemble Performance

- **Shaw: Evergreen – Attacca Quartet**
- Beethoven: Complete String Quartets, Volume 2 - The Middle Quartets – Dover Quartet
- Musical Remembrances – Neave Trio
- Perspectives – Third Coast Percussion
- What Is American – PUBLIQuartet

Best Classical Instrumental Solo

- **Letters For The Future – Time for Three; Xian Zhang, conductor (The Philadelphia Orchestra)**
- Abels: Isolation Variation – Hilary Hahn
- Bach: The Art Of Life – Daniil Trifonov
- Beethoven: Diabelli Variations – Mitsuko Uchida
- A Night In Upper Town - The Music Of Zoran Krajacic – Mak Grgić

Best Classical Solo Vocal Album

- **Voice Of Nature - The Anthropocene**
  - **Renée Fleming, soloist; Yannick Nézet-Séguin, pianist**
- Eden
  - Joyce DiDonato, soloist; Maxim Emelyanychev, conductor (Il Pomo D'Oro)
- How Do I Find You
  - Sasha Cooke, soloist; Kirill Kuzmin, pianist
- Okpebholo: Lord, How Come Me Here?
  - Will Liverman, soloist; Paul Sánchez, pianist (J'Nai Bridges and Caen Thomason-Redus)
- Stranger - Works For Tenor By Nico Muhly
  - Nicholas Phan, soloist (Eric Jacobson; Brooklyn Rider and The Knights; Reginald Mobley)

Best Classical Compendium

- **An Adoption Story**
  - **Starr Parodi and Kitt Wakeley; Jeff Fair, Starr Parodi and Kitt Wakeley, producers**
- Aspire
  - JP Jofre and Seunghee Lee; Enrico Fagone, conductor; Jonathan Allen, producer
- A Concert For Ukraine
  - Yannick Nézet-Séguin, conductor; David Frost, producer
- The Lost Birds
  - Voces8; Barnaby Smith and Christopher Tin, conductors; Sean Patrick Flahaven and Christopher Tin, producers

Best Contemporary Classical Composition

- **Puts: Contact Kevin Puts, composer (Xian Zhang, Time for Three and the Philadelphia Orchestra)**
- Akiho: Ligneous Suite Andy Akiho, composer (Ian Rosenbaum and Dover Quartet)
- Bermel: Intonations Derek Bermel, composer (Jack Quartet)
- Gubaidulina: The Wrath Of God Sofia Gubaidulina, composer (Andris Nelsons and Gewandhausorchester)
- Simon: Requiem For The Enslaved Carlos Simon, composer (Carlos Simon, MK Zulu, Marco Pavé and Hub New Music)

=== Music video and film ===
Best Music Video

- **All Too Well: The Short Film – Taylor Swift**
  - **Taylor Swift, video director; Saul Germaine, video producer**
- "Easy on Me" – Adele
  - Xavier Dolan, video director; Xavier Dolan and Nancy Grant, video producers
- "Yet to Come" – BTS
  - Yong Seok Choi, video director; Tiffany Suh, video producer
- "Woman" – Doja Cat
  - Child., video director; Missy Galanida, Sam Houston, Michelle Larkin and Isaac Rice, video producers
- "The Heart Part 5" – Kendrick Lamar
  - Dave Free and Kendrick Lamar, video directors; Jason Baum and Jamie Rabineau, video producers
- "As It Was" – Harry Styles
  - Tanu Muino, video director; Frank Borin, Ivanna Borin, Fred Bonham Carter and Alexa Haywood, video producers

Best Music Film

- **Jazz Fest: A New Orleans Story – Various artists**
  - **Frank Marshall and Ryan Suffern, video directors; Frank Marshall, Sean Stuart and Ryan Suffern, video producers**
- Adele One Night Only – Adele
  - Paul Dugdale, video director
- Our World – Justin Bieber
  - Michael D. Ratner, video director; Kfir Goldberg, Andy Mininger and Scott Ratner, video producers
- Billie Eilish Live at the O2 – Billie Eilish
  - Sam Wrench, video director; Michelle An, Tom Colbourne, Chelsea Dodson and Billie Eilish, video producers
- Motomami (Rosalía TikTok Live Performance) – Rosalía
  - Ferrán Echegaray, Rosalía Vila Tobella and Stillz, video directors
- A Band A Brotherhood A Barn – Neil Young and Crazy Horse
  - Dhlovelife, video director; Gary Ward, video producer

== Special merit awards ==
=== MusiCares Person of the Year ===
- Berry Gordy
- Smokey Robinson

=== Lifetime Achievement Awards ===
- The Supremes
- Nirvana
- Ma Rainey
- Nile Rodgers
- Ann Wilson and Nancy Wilson
- Bobby McFerrin
- Slick Rick

=== Dr. Dre Global Impact Award ===
- Dr. Dre

=== Best Song for Social Change ===
- "Baraye" – Shervin Hajipour

=== Music Educator Award ===
- Pamela Dawson

== Multiple nominations and awards ==
The following received multiple nominations:

Nine:

- Beyoncé

Eight:

- Kendrick Lamar

Seven:

- Adele
- Brandi Carlile

Six:

- Mary J. Blige
- Future
- DJ Khaled
- Randy Merrill
- Harry Styles
- The-Dream

Five:

- Doja Cat
- Lucky Daye
- Şerban Ghenea
- Jay-Z
- Lizzo
- Maverick City Music
- Yannick Nézet-Séguin

Four:

- ABBA
- Beach Noise (Jake Kosich, Johnny Kosich, Matt Schaeffer)
- Boi-1da
- D'Mile
- Drake
- Tom Elmhirst
- H.E.R.
- Kid Harpoon
- Jeremy Hatcher
- Steve Lacy
- Miranda Lambert
- Emerson Mancini
- Manny Marroquin
- Ozzy Osbourne
- Bonnie Raitt
- Christopher "Tricky" Stewart
- Taylor Swift

Three:

- Amy Allen
- John Beasley
- Bryce Bordone
- Bad Bunny
- BTS
- Coldplay
- Luke Combs
- DOE
- Kirk Franklin
- David Frost
- Phil Hanseroth
- Tim Hanseroth
- Jack Harlow
- Jens Christian Isaksen
- Tobias Jesso Jr.
- Tyler Johnson
- Greg Kurstin
- John Legend
- Colin Leonard
- Lil Wayne
- Morten Lindberg
- Muni Long
- Lucius
- Max Martin
- Maren Morris
- PJ Morton
- Willie Nelson
- Nova Wav (Brittany "Chi" Coney, Denisia "Blu June" Andrews)
- Aoife O'Donovan
- Robert Plant
- Rick Ross
- Blake Slatkin
- Jazmine Sullivan
- Tems
- Turnstile
- Wet Leg
- Stuart White

Two:

- Rauw Alejandro
- Brandon Bell
- Big Thief
- Rob Bisel
- The Black Keys
- BloodPop
- Blxst
- Bonobo
- Mike Bozzi
- Ray Charles Brown Jr.
- Julian Burg
- Burna Boy
- Nija Charles
- Dave Cobb
- Jacob Collier
- Madison Cunningham
- Dahi
- Diplo
- Domi & JD Beck
- Billie Eilish
- Björn Engelmann
- Lady Gaga
- Gunna
- Brandon Harding
- Michael Harris
- Sam Holland
- James Hunt
- Idles
- Michael Ilbert
- Shooter Jennings
- Samara Joy
- Patrick Kehrier
- Pat Kelly
- Angelique Kidjo
- Alison Krauss
- Latto
- Bernard Löhr
- Pete Lyman
- Bill Malina
- Ashley McBryde
- Chris McLaughlin
- Lin-Manuel Miranda
- Anderson .Paak
- Dolly Parton
- Ricky Reed
- Amanda Reifer
- Morten Ristorp
- Nile Rodgers
- Rosalía
- Rüfüs Du Sol
- Raphael Saadiq
- Anoushka Shankar
- Chad Smith
- Spike Stent
- Chris Tomlin
- Tye Tribbett
- Johnathan Turner
- Molly Tuttle
- Phil Wickham
- Sammy Witte
- Yeah Yeah Yeahs
- Young Thug
- Hans Zimmer

The following received multiple awards:

Four:

- Beyoncé
- Maverick City Music

Three:

- Brandi Carlile
- Kirk Franklin
- Kendrick Lamar
- Bonnie Raitt
- Kabir Sehgal

Two:

- Jeremy Hatcher
- Tobias Jesso Jr.
- Samara Joy
- Randy Merrill
- Willie Nelson
- Yannick Nézet-Séguin
- Ozzy Osbourne
- Harry Styles
- The-Dream
- Wet Leg

== In Memoriam ==
The show honored artists and industry professionals who had died within the year leading up to the ceremony.

- Loretta Lynn
- Olivia Newton-John
- Naomi Judd
- Mickey Gilley
- Dr. Paul T. Kwami
- Christine Farnon
- Thom Bell
- Joseph Tarsia
- Jim Stewart
- Dave Smith
- Peter Cooper
- Mo Ostin
- Barrett Strong
- Jeff Beck
- Ramsey Lewis
- Jerry Allison
- Dino Danelli
- Pharoah Sanders
- Ian McDonald
- Keith Levene
- Alec John Such
- Fred E. White
- Andrew Woolfolk
- Takeoff
- Anita Pointer
- Coolio
- Bruce Gowers
- DJ Kay Slay
- Irene Cara
- Fitzroy "Bunny" Simpson
- Donald Shaw
- Stephen "tWitch" Boss
- John ‘Knocker’ Knowles
- Tyrone Downie
- Hurricane G
- Hector Ramirez
- PnB Rock
- David Crosby
- Ronnie Hawkins
- Sam Gooden
- Andrew Fletcher
- Jim Seals
- Vangelis
- Christine McVie
- Lisa Marie Presley
- Gal Costa
- Tom Verlaine
- Bobby Rydell
- Jerry Lee Lewis
- John L. Eastman
- Charlie Rachlin
- Terry Hall
- Yukihiro Takahashi
- Charles Koppelman
- John Beug
- Jeff Cook
- Lamont Dozier
