= Grammy Trustees Award =

American music award

The Grammy Trustees Award is awarded by The Recording Academy to individuals who, during their careers in music, technology, and so on have made significant contributions, other than performance, to the field of recording. From 1983 onwards, performers could also receive this award. This award is distinct from the Grammy Lifetime Achievement Award, which honors performers.

== Trustees Award recipients ==
The following individuals have received Trustees Awards, listed by year.

| Year | Recipient(s) | Ref. |
|---|---|---|
| 1967 | Georg Solti and John Culshaw | |
| 1968 | Duke Ellington and Billy Strayhorn, Krzysztof Penderecki | |
| 1970 | Robert Moog | |
| 1971 | Chris Albertson, John Hammond, Larry Hiller, Paul Weston | |
| 1972 | The Beatles | |
| 1977 | Thomas Edison, Leopold Stokowski | |
| 1979 | Goddard Lieberson, Frank Sinatra | |
| 1981 | Count Basie, Aaron Copland | |
| 1983 | Les Paul | |
| 1984 | Béla Bartók | |
| 1985 | Eldridge R. Johnson | |
| 1986 | George and Ira Gershwin | |
| 1987 | Harold Arlen, Emile Berliner, Jerome Kern, Johnny Mercer | |
| 1989 | Walt Disney, Quincy Jones, Cole Porter | |
| 1990 | Dick Clark | |
| 1991 | Milt Gabler, Berry Gordy, Sam Phillips | |
| 1992 | Thomas A. Dorsey, Christine Farnon, Oscar Hammerstein II, Lorenz Hart | |
| 1993 | Ahmet and Nesuhi Ertegun, W. C. Handy, George T. Simon | |
| 1994 | Norman Granz | |
| 1995 | Pierre Cossette | |
| 1996 | George Martin, Jerry Wexler | |
| 1997 | Herb Alpert and Jerry Moss, Burt Bacharach and Hal David, Alan Jay Lerner and Frederick Loewe, Jerry Leiber and Mike Stoller | |
| 1998 | Holland-Dozier-Holland, Frances Preston, Richard Rodgers | |
| 1999 | Kenneth Gamble and Leon Huff | |
| 2000 | Clive Davis, Phil Spector | |
| 2001 | Arif Mardin, Phil Ramone | |
| 2002 | Tom Dowd, Alan Freed | |
| 2003 | Alan Lomax, New York Philharmonic | |
| 2004 | Gerry Goffin and Carole King, Orrin Keepnews, Marian McPartland | |
| 2005 | Hoagy Carmichael, Don Cornelius, Alfred Lion, Billy Taylor | |
| 2006 | Chris Blackwell, Owen Bradley, Al Schmitt | |
| 2007 | Estelle Axton, Cosimo Matassa, Stephen Sondheim | |
| 2008 | Clarence Avant, Jac Holzman, Willie Mitchell | |
| 2009 | George Avakian, Elliott Carter, Allen Toussaint | |
| 2010 | Harold Bradley, Florence Greenberg, Walter C. Miller | |
| 2011 | Al Bell, Wilma Cozart Fine, Bruce Lundvall | |
| 2012 | Dave Bartholomew, Steve Jobs, Rudy Van Gelder | |
| 2013 | Alan and Marilyn Bergman, Leonard and Phil Chess, Alan Livingston | |
| 2014 | Ennio Morricone, Rick Hall, Jim Marshall | |
| 2015 | Barry Mann and Cynthia Weil, Richard Perry, George Wein | |
| 2016 | John Cage, Fred Foster, Chris Strachwitz | |
| 2017 | Thom Bell, Mo Ostin, Ralph S. Peer | |
| 2018 | Bill Graham, Seymour Stein, John Williams | |
| 2019 | Lou Adler, Ashford & Simpson, Johnny Mandel | |
| 2020 | Frank Buckley Walker, Ken Ehrlich, Philip Glass | |
| 2021 | Ed Cherney, Benny Golson, Kenny "Babyface" Edmonds | |
| 2023 | Henry Diltz, Ellis Marsalis Jr., Jim Stewart | |
| 2024 | Peter Asher, DJ Kool Herc, Joel Katz | |
| 2025 | Erroll Garner, Glyn Johns, Tania León | |
| 2026 | Bernie Taupin, Eddie Palmieri, Sylvia Rhone | |
