= Christine Farnon =

Music industry professional (1925–2022)

Christine Miller Farnon (June 24, 1925 – October 24, 2022) was an American music executive with the National Academy of Recording Arts and Sciences. Early on in her career, Farnon was an event producer of the 1st Annual Grammy Awards in 1959. When she started her executive director tenure at NARAS's main branch in 1971, Farnon oversaw the Grammy Hall of Fame and was an event producer for the 1977 Grammy Awards. Near the end of her career, Farnon held the position of executive vice president from 1989 until her retirement in 1992. Upon her retirement, Farnon was the first woman ever to receive the Grammy Trustees Award.

== Early life and education ==
Farnon was born in Chicago, Illinois, on June 24, 1925, and went to Los Angeles for her post-secondary education in business.

== Career ==
Farnon started her career with the National Academy of Recording Arts and Sciences as an executive secretary in 1957. A few years later, Farnon was an event organizer of the 1st Annual Grammy Awards in 1959. She moved to NARAS's Los Angeles branch in 1961 to become the new executive director when Stan Richardson stepped down from his position. Farnon remained as the Los Angeles executive director until she left her position in 1969.

Farnon returned to work for the main branch of NARAS in 1971 as the organization's executive director. During her tenure, Farnon oversaw the operation of the Grammy Hall of Fame and was one of the preparers for the 1977 Grammy Awards. After she became NARAS's executive vice president in 1989, she remained with the organization until her retirement in 1992.

== Personal life and death ==
Farnon had one child. She died on October 24, 2022, at the age of 97.

== Awards and honors ==
In 1992, Farnon was the first ever woman recipient of the Grammy Trustees Award.
