= And Our Feelings =

Single by Babyface

from the album For the Cool in You
- Released: 1994
- Recorded: 1993
- Genre: R&B; soul
- Length: 5:42
- Label: Epic
- Songwriters: Babyface; Daryl Simmons
- Producers: L.A. Reid; Babyface; Daryl Simmons

Babyface singles chronology
"Never Keeping Secrets" (1993)	"And Our Feelings" (1994)	"Rock Bottom" (1994)

Music video
- "And Our Feelings" on YouTube

"And Our Feelings" is a song by American R&B musician and songwriter Babyface, released in 1994 by Epic Records as the third single from his third album, For the Cool in You (1993). The song was co-written and co-produced by him, peaking at number 21 on the US Billboard Hot 100 and number eight on the Billboard Hot R&B Singles chart. The accompanying music video was directed by Randee St. Nicholas and filmed in Los Angeles. Robert Brinkman directed photography and John Hopgood produced the video.

== Critical reception ==
Larry Flick from Billboard magazine wrote, "Follow-up to 'Never Keeping Secrets' is another of Babyface's patented soundtracks to an evening of romance. His emotional delivery is matched by a swaying, soulful rhythm and a chorus that sticks to the brain upon impact. Completely in the pocket of top 40 and urban radio trends, this one should meet with ardent programmer approval. Another good reason to investigate the current For the Cool in You set."

== Charts ==
=== Weekly charts ===
Chart (1994)	Peak position
US Billboard Hot 100	21
US Hot R&B Singles (Billboard)	8
US Adult Contemporary (Billboard)	38
US Cash Box Top 100	18

=== Year-end charts ===
Chart (1994)	Position
US Billboard Hot 100	98
