= For the Cool in You =

Studio album by Babyface
- Released: August 24, 1993
- Recorded: 1992–1993
- Studios: Doppler Studios; Studio LaCoCo (Atlanta, Georgia); Larrabee Sound Studios; Encore Studios; Elumba Recording Studios; The Lighthouse Studios (Los Angeles, California)
- Genres: Pop; R&B
- Length: 52:21
- Label: Epic
- Producers: Kenneth "Babyface" Edmonds; Antonio "L.A." Reid; Daryl Simmons

Babyface chronology
A Closer Look (1991)	For the Cool in You (1993)	The Day (1996)

Singles from For The Cool in You
- 1. "For the Cool in You" Released: 1993; 2. "Never Keeping Secrets" Released: 1993; 3. "And Our Feelings" Released: 1994; 4. "Rock Bottom" Released: 1994; 5. "When Can I See You" Released: May 20, 1994

Professional ratings
Review scores
Source	Rating
AllMusic	4/5 stars
Philadelphia Inquirer	2.5/4 stars
The Rolling Stone Album Guide	3/5 stars

For the Cool in You is the third studio album by American R&B musician and songwriter Babyface released by Epic in North America on 24 August 1993. The album reached number sixteen on the US Billboard 200 and at number two on the Top R&B Albums chart. The album spawned five singles, the lead single (and title track) "For the Cool in You" (US No. 81, R&B No. 10), "Never Keeping Secrets" (US No. 15, R&B No. 3), "And Our Feelings" (US No. 21, R&B No. 7), "Rock Bottom", and "When Can I See You" which became his biggest (and third) top-ten hit on the Billboard Hot 100, peaking at number four, and reaching number six on the Hot R&B Singles chart.

The album received a nomination in the category of Best Male R&B Vocal Performance at the 37th Grammy Awards. On January 29, 1997, the album was certified 3× Platinum by the Recording Industry Association of America (RIAA).

== Track listing ==
For the Cool in You track listing
No.	Title	Writer(s)	Length
1.	"For the Cool in You"	Kenneth "Babyface" Edmonds; Daryl Simmons	4:54
2.	"Lady, Lady"	Edmonds	4:23
3.	"Never Keeping Secrets"	Edmonds	4:53
4.	"Rock Bottom"	Edmonds; Antonio "L.A." Reid; Simmons	4:45
5.	"And Our Feelings"	Edmonds; Simmons	5:42
6.	"Saturday"	Edmonds; Reid; Simmons	3:44
7.	"When Can I See You"	Edmonds	3:49
8.	"Illusions"	Edmonds	5:24
9.	"A Bit Old-Fashioned"	Edmonds	2:56
10.	"You Are So Beautiful"	Bruce Fisher; Billy Preston	3:16
11.	"I'll Always Love You"	Edmonds; Reid; Simmons	4:34
12.	"Well Alright"	Edmonds	4:01
Total length:			52:21

2001 re-issue bonus tracks
No.	Title	Writer(s)	Length
13.	"For the Cool in You" (Quiet Storm Vocal Mix)	Edmonds; Simmons	4:57
14.	"When Can I See You" (Urban Soul Basement Mix)	Edmonds	6:15
15.	"For the Cool in You" (Midnight Luv Instrumental Mix)	Edmonds; Simmons	4:55
Total length:			68:28

- "Well Alright" was originally released on the Poetic Justice soundtrack album, June 1993.

== Personnel ==
Credits adapted from liner notes.

- Lead vocals, backing vocals, keyboards, bass guitar, executive producer – Babyface
- Background vocals – Anthony Kemp, Daryl Simmons, After 7
- Skins (Drum programming) – L.A. Reid
- Bottom (bass) – Kayo
- Saxophone – Larry Jackson
- MIDI programming – Donald Parks, Randy Walker
- Recording engineers – Jim Zumpano, Brad Gilderman
- Assistant engineers – John Frye, Lori Fumar, Steve Warner, Kevin Becks, Milton Chan, Eduardo Correa, Kimm James, Jason Shablik, Ray Silva, Thom Russo
- Mixing – Dave Way, Barney Perkins
- Mastering – Herb Powers, Jr.
- Production coordinator – Ivy Skoff
- Art direction – Marc Bennett Studio
- Photography – Rick Day
- Stylists – Bernard Jacobs, Anthony Mitchell

== Charts ==
=== Weekly charts ===
Chart (1993)	Peak position
Australian Albums (ARIA)	46
New Zealand Albums (RMNZ)	49
US Billboard 200	16
US Top R&B/Hip-Hop Albums (Billboard)	2

=== Year-end charts ===
Chart (1993)	Position
US Top R&B/Hip-Hop Albums (Billboard)	25

Chart (1994)	Position
US Billboard 200	72
US Top R&B/Hip-Hop Albums (Billboard)	12

== Certifications ==
Region	Certification	Certified units/sales
Canada (Music Canada)	Gold	50,000^{^}
United States (RIAA)	3× Platinum	3,000,000^{^}
^{^} Shipments figures based on certification alone.
