= Lovers (Babyface album) =

- Original 1986 Solar release

Studio album by Babyface
- Released: October 7, 1986; September 12, 1989 (re-issue)
- Recorded: 1986
- Genre: R&B
- Length: 39:04
- Labels: SOLAR (1986 release), Epic (1989 re-issue)
- Producers: L.A. Reid; Babyface

Babyface chronology
Lovers (1986)	Tender Lover (1989)

Singles from Lovers
- 1. "I Love You Babe" Released: December 12, 1986; 2. "Lovers" Released: 1987; 3. "Mary Mack" Released: 1987; 4. "If We Try" Released: 1988

Professional ratings
Review scores
Source	Rating
AllMusic	3/5 stars
The Rolling Stone Album Guide	2/5 stars

Lovers is the debut studio album by American R&B singer-songwriter and musician Babyface. It was originally released on October 7, 1986, while he was taking a break from his band the Deele. Album charted number 28 on the Soul Album Charts. The album was reissued in 1989 under Epic Records with a different front cover after the success of his second album Tender Lover.

== Track listing ==
No.	Title	Writer(s)	Length
1.	"You Make Me Feel Brand New"	Thom Bell; Linda Creed	5:03
2.	"Lovers"	Darnell "Dee" Bristol; Kenneth "Babyface" Edmonds; Antonio "L.A." Reid; Kevin "Kayo" Roberson	5:56
3.	"Chivalry"	Edmonds; Sidney Johnson	4:38
4.	"I Love You Babe"	Edmonds	4:09
5.	"Mary Mack"	Bristol; Edmonds; Roberson	5:28
6.	"Faithful"	Edmonds; Johnson	5:08
7.	"If We Try"	Tony Coates; Edmonds; Lynelle Edmonds	4:05
8.	"Take Your Time"	Edmonds; Reid; Daryl Simmons	4:37
9.	"I Love You Babe" (Reprise)	Edmonds	0:51

2001 re-issue bonus tracks
No.	Title	Writer(s)	Length
10.	"Mary Mack" (Free Style Mix)	Bristol; Edmonds; Roberson	5:54
11.	"If We Try" (12" version)	Coates; Edmonds; L. Edmonds	8:36
12.	"Lovers" (Jazz Lover's Mix)	Bristol; Edmonds; Reid; Roberson	6:29

== Charts ==
Chart (1986–87)	Peak position
US Top R&B/Hip-Hop Albums (Billboard)	28
