= Tender Lover =

- Vinyl edition of standard artwork

Studio album by Babyface
- Released: July 7, 1989
- Recorded: 1988–1989
- Studios: Elumba Recording Studios; Galaxy Sound Studios; M'Bila Studios (Hollywood, California)
- Genres: Soul; R&B; new jack swing
- Length: 48:51
- Labels: SOLAR; Epic
- Producers: L.A. Reid; Babyface

Babyface chronology
Lovers (1986)	Tender Lover (1989)	A Closer Look (1991)

Singles from Tender Lover
- 1. "It's No Crime" Released: June 13, 1989; 2. "Tender Lover" Released: October 3, 1989; 3. "Whip Appeal" Released: February 22, 1990; 4. "My Kinda Girl" Released: May 29, 1990

Tender Lover is the second studio album by American R&B singer-songwriter Babyface. The album was released on July 7, 1989. It is the follow-up to his debut Lovers (1986). It was his first album with SOLAR (Sound of Los Angeles Records) after the label entered into a distribution deal with Epic Records. In some regions of Europe, Tender Lover was released with a different cover picture and simply titled Babyface.

Professional ratings
Review scores
Source	Rating
AllMusic	4.5/5 stars
Christgau's Record Guide	B
The Rolling Stone Album Guide	3.5/5 stars

== Background ==
Babyface and fellow songwriter/producer Daryl Simmons first met each other as teenagers in Indianapolis, Indiana. The two played in a couple of bands together and later joined the funk outfit Manchild. The band recorded two albums before disbanding in the late 1970s. Cincinnati-based band Midnight Star came to perform in Indianapolis, which became good friends with Babyface and Simmons. Babyface then left Indianapolis for Cincinnati to write songs with Midnight Star – one of which became the song "Slow Jam" from their 1983 album No Parking on the Dance Floor as well as a couple of songs produced by Midnight Star founding member Reggie Calloway on The Whispers' 1984 album So Good. Around that same time, Calloway was producing the debut album for the band The Deele, who had just gotten signed to SOLAR Records. Group members L.A. Reid and Darnell Bristol asked Babyface to join, which led him to ask Simmons to help with songwriting and touring duties.

After joining The Deele, Babyface and Simmons tried getting songs to other acts on SOLAR such as Shalamar, Dynasty and Lakeside, but all of the acts turned them down. Although they were signed to a label, Reid, Babyface and Simmons kept paying dues on the production side in order to make something happen for them. They spent three years in Los Angeles working with The Deele and writing songs, as Babyface and Simmons were determined not to go back to Indianapolis. After a few years of trying to gain some recognition, at least one of their songs was accepted and recorded in 1986, "Personality" by Dynasty, from their "Daydreamin'" album, written and produced by L.A. and Babyface. Then in 1987, the team secured another production placement by writing and producing the song "Rock Steady" for The Whispers from their 1987 album Just Gets Better with Time. Simmons went back to Cincinnati, which caused Reid and Babyface to call him for more collaborations, as their production career started taking off.

Just as he had done in The Deele, Reid became the driving force of the newly established production team. Under his control, he made the decisions on what songs went to certain artists and who they wanted to work with. They went on to work on albums from Karyn White, Sheena Easton, Johnny Gill and Paula Abdul. Although the production of the album was credited to L.A. Reid & Babyface, Simmons revealed that Babyface actually produced the bulk of it with Reid handling the uptempo songs as he came from a funk background, while he and Babyface were more focused on ballads. They would record the songs with Reid overseeing the production of the music while Babyface concentrated on the aspect of lead and background vocals. According to Simmons, they would work long hours with Reid being in the studio many sleepless nights fine tuning the songs.

Tender Lover was mixed by Jim Zumpano, Jon Gass and Barney Perkins, the latter of which worked on Anita Baker's album Rapture as well as DeBarge's In a Special Way.

== Commercial performance ==
Released on July 23, 1989, Tender Lover contains Babyface's debut Top 10 hit, "It's No Crime", which reached #7 on the U.S. Hot 100 and later single "Whip Appeal", which reached #6 in the same chart. To date, Tender Lover is his highest charting R&B album as it topped that chart for eight nonconsecutive weeks; "Tender Lover" and "It's No Crime" were #1 R&B singles from this album. On June 28, 2001, Tender Lover was certified 3× Platinum by the Recording Industry Association of America (RIAA).

== Reception ==
Tender Lover was a critical and commercial success, reaching number fourteen on the US Billboard 200 and opened at number one on the Top R&B Albums chart. Babyface received numerous nominations for Favorite Soul/R&B New Artist at the 17th American Music Awards and three Grammy nominations, the top-ten US singles "Whip Appeal" received a nomination for Best Male R&B Vocal Performance, "It's No Crime" for Best R&B Instrumental Performance and a nomination for Producer of the Year with L.A. Reid. Also, it won him a Soul Train Music Award for Best R&B/Soul Album, Male in 1990.

== Covers ==
A couple of songs from this album have been covered by a few artists. Short-lived A&M Records group B.B.O.T.I. covered "Where Will You Go" from their first and only album Bad Boyz of the Industry in 1993. Singer Bobby Valentino covered "Soon As I Get Home" on his second album, 2007's Special Occasion.

== In popular culture ==
"Soon as I Get Home" appeared in the 2010 film, Our Family Wedding which starred Forest Whitaker and America Ferrera.

== Track listing ==
No.	Title	Writer(s)	Length
1.	"It's No Crime"	Kenneth "Babyface" Edmonds; Antonio "L.A." Reid; Daryl Simmons	4:02
2.	"Tender Lover"	Edmonds; Reid; Perri "Pebbles" Reid*	4:19
3.	"Let's Be Romantic"	Edmonds; Simmons	5:01
4.	"Can't Stop My Heart"	Edmonds; Reid; Simmons	4:31
5.	"My Kinda Girl"	Edmonds; Reid; Simmons	4:39
6.	"Where Will You Go" (Prelude)	Edmonds	0:40
7.	"Whip Appeal"	Edmonds; P. Reid	5:49
8.	"Soon as I Get Home"	Edmonds	5:09
9.	"Given a Chance"	Edmonds	4:21
10.	"Sunshine"	Edmonds	5:11
11.	"Where Will You Go"	Edmonds	5:09

2001 re-issue bonus tracks
No.	Title	Writer(s)	Length
12.	"Tender Lover" (Dub L.A.)	Edmonds; Reid; P. Reid	5:53
13.	"My Kinda Girl" (12" Version / Scratch Mix)	Edmonds; Reid; Simmons	7:06
14.	"Whip Appeal" (12" Version / The Ultimate Whip)	Edmonds; P. Reid	5:31

- Note: Perri "Pebbles" Reid is credited as Perri Smith in the original liner notes of Tender Lover.

== Personnel ==
- Babyface – lead vocals, guitars, keyboards
- Kayo (Kevin Roberson) – bass, keyboards, synthesizer, synthesized bass
- De'rock (Daryl Simmons) – percussion
- L.A. Reid – drums, percussion
- Donald Parks – Fairlight programming, Synclavier programming
- After 7 – backing vocals
- Troop – backing vocals
- Jon Gass – recording and mix engineer
- David Rideau – engineer
- Donnell Sullivan – assistant engineer
- Rich Caughron – assistant engineer
- Joseph M. Palmaccio – mastering

== Charts ==
=== Weekly charts ===
Chart (1989–1990)	Peak position
Australian Albums (ARIA)	143
US Billboard 200	14
US Top R&B/Hip-Hop Albums (Billboard)	1

=== Year-end charts ===
Chart (1989)	Position
US Top R&B/Hip-Hop Albums (Billboard)	38
Chart (1990)	Position
US Billboard 200	21
US Top R&B/Hip-Hop Albums (Billboard)	2

=== Singles ===
Year	Single	Chart position	
Year	Single	US Pop	US R&B
1989	"It's No Crime"	7	1
1989	"Tender Lover"	14	1
1990	"My Kinda Girl"	30	3
1990	"Whip Appeal"	6	2

== Certifications ==
Region	Certification	Certified units/sales
United States (RIAA)	3× Platinum	3,000,000^{^}
^{^} Shipments figures based on certification alone.

== See also ==
- List of number-one R&B albums of 1989 (U.S.)
- List of number-one R&B albums of 1990 (U.S.)
