= Tender Lover (song) =

Single by Babyface

from the album Tender Lover
- Released: October 3, 1989
- Recorded: 1989
- Genre: R&B, new jack swing
- Length: 4:19
- Label: SOLAR; Epic; Columbia/CBS
- Songwriters: Babyface, L.A. Reid, P. Smith
- Producers: Babyface, L.A. Reid

Babyface singles chronology
"It's No Crime" (1989)	"Tender Lover" (1989)	"Whip Appeal" (1990)

"Tender Lover" is a song performed and produced by R&B and soul singer Babyface (born as Kenneth Edmonds). It was the title track from the 1989 namesake album and the second single. Featuring backing vocals by Troop, it was Babyface's second single and last number one single on the Hot Black Singles chart. As his previous single had done, "Tender Lover", was also a Top 40 hit, peaking at number fourteen for the week of February 3rd, 1990. A remix released for radio features a rap verse by Bobby Brown.

== See also ==
- List of number-one R&B singles of 1989 (U.S.)
