= I Love You Babe =

Single by Babyface

from the album Lovers
- B-side: "Lovers", "You Make Me Feel Brand New"
- Released: December 12, 1986
- Recorded: 1986
- Genre: R&B; post-disco; funk
- Length: 4:09
- Label: SOLAR
- Songwriter(s): Babyface
- Producer(s): L.A. Reid; Babyface

Babyface singles chronology
"I Love You Babe" (1986)	"Lovers" (1987)

"I Love You Babe" is a song written, co-produced and performed by American contemporary R&B singer Babyface, issued as the lead single from his debut studio album Lovers. The song peaked at #8 on the Billboard R&B chart in 1987.

== Chart positions ==
Chart (1987)	Peak position
US Hot Dance Music/Maxi-Singles Sales (Billboard)	43
US Hot R&B/Hip-Hop Singles & Tracks (Billboard)	8
