= It's No Crime =

Single by Babyface

from the album Tender Lover
- Released: June 13, 1989
- Recorded: 1988
- Genre: New jack swing
- Length: 4:02
- Label: SOLAR, Epic
- Songwriters: Kenneth "Babyface" Edmonds; Antonio "L.A." Reid; Daryl Simmons
- Producers: L.A. & Babyface

Babyface singles chronology
"Love Saw It" (1989)	"It's No Crime" (1989)	"Tender Lover" (1989)

"It's No Crime" is a 1989 song written and performed by Babyface. The single was Babyface's first entry on the Hot 100 as a solo artist, peaking at number seven and reaching number one on the Hot Black Singles chart. The single was Babyface's only chart entry on the dance charts, where it peaked at number five.

The song was sampled by Skrillex and Solomun for their 2026 single "Rumpta".

== Charts ==
=== Weekly charts ===
Chart (1989)	Peak position
Australia (ARIA)	153
New Zealand (Recorded Music NZ)	24
US Billboard Hot 100	7
US Hot R&B/Hip-Hop Songs (Billboard)	1

=== Year-end charts ===
Chart (1989)	Position
US Billboard Hot 100	90
US Hot R&B/Hip-Hop Songs (Billboard)	20
