= For the Cool in You (song) =

Single by Babyface

from the album For the Cool in You
- Released: August 10, 1993
- Recorded: 1992
- Genre: R&B; new jack swing; jazz
- Length: 4:54 (album version); 4:00 (single edit)
- Label: Epic
- Songwriters: Babyface; Daryl Simmons
- Producers: Babyface; Daryl Simmons; L.A. Reid

Babyface singles chronology
"Give U My Heart" (1992)	"For the Cool in You" (1993)	"Never Keeping Secrets" (1993)

Music video
- "For the Cool in You" on YouTube

"For the Cool in You" is a song co-written, co-produced and performed by American contemporary R&B singer Babyface. The song was written by Babyface, Daryl Simmons, and produced by the former, Simmons and L.A. Reid. It is the opening and title track to his third studio album (1993) and was issued as the album's first single on August 10, 1993, by Epic Records. The song peaked at #81 on the Billboard Hot 100 in 1993.

In 1994, "For the Cool in You" was nominated for a Grammy Award for Best R&B Vocal Performance, Male.

Then-NBA player and jazz musician Wayman Tisdale covered the song titled "Jazz in You", which appeared on his 1995 debut album Power Forward.

"For the Cool in You" was featured on a fifth-season episode of ABC's Family Matters episode titled "Dr. Urkel and Mr. Cool", in which Stefan Urquelle, Steve Urkel's suave alter ego, dances to the song with Laura Winslow at her birthday party.

== Music video ==
The official music video for the song was directed by Andy Morahan.

The video is shot in black and white, and it is concerned primarily with images and mood, featuring no traditional storyline. Babyface sings and dances in two environments: one with a white background and the other, a black background in which a white outline sometimes appears around him. He is accompanied by dancers and band members playing guitar, bass, piano, saxophone, and drums. Images in the video include the turning blades of a fan, incense smoke, snow, and a snare drum covered in diamonds bouncing off its head as a drum stick strikes it. The song ends as Babyface melts into a silver puddle on a black floor.

== Charts ==
=== Weekly charts ===
Chart (1993)	Peak position
Australia (ARIA)	171
Europe (European Dance Radio)	24
US Billboard Hot 100	81
US Hot R&B/Hip-Hop Songs (Billboard)	10
US Maxi-Singles Sales (Billboard)	23
US Rhythmic Airplay (Billboard)	7

=== Year-end charts ===
Chart (1993)	Position
US Hot R&B Singles (Billboard)	73
