= My Kinda Girl (Babyface song) =

Single by Babyface

from the album Tender Lover
- Released: May 29, 1990
- Recorded: 1989
- Genre: R&B, new jack swing
- Length: 4:39 (album version); 4:10 (single edit)
- Label: SOLAR, Epic
- Songwriters: Babyface, Daryl Simmons, L.A. Reid
- Producers: Babyface, L.A. Reid

Babyface singles chronology
"Whip Appeal" (1990)	"My Kinda Girl" (1990)	"Love Makes Things Happen" (1990)

Music video
- "My Kinda Girl" on YouTube

"My Kinda Girl" is a song performed and co-written by American musician Babyface, issued as the fourth and final single from his second album, Tender Lover (1989). The song was also the fourth consecutive hit single from the album, peaking at #30 on the Billboard Hot 100 in 1990. SOLAR and Epic Records released 7 remixes of the recording with a remix of "Whip Appeal" in 1990, which was available as a CD single.

== Personnel ==
- Babyface: lead and background vocals, songwriter, producer, arranger, keyboards
- L.A. Reid: songwriter, producer, arranger, drums, percussion
- Daryl Simmons: songwriter, percussion
- Kayo: Moog bass
- Donald Parks: Fairlight synthesizer programming

== Charts ==
=== Weekly charts ===
Chart (1990)	Peak position
US Billboard Hot 100	30
US Hot Dance Music/Maxi-Singles Sales (Billboard)	28
US Hot R&B/Hip-Hop Singles & Tracks (Billboard)	3
US Cash Box Top 100	32

=== Year-end charts ===
Chart (1990)	Position
US Hot R&B/Hip-Hop Singles & Tracks (Billboard)	37
