= Never Keeping Secrets =

Single by Babyface

from the album For the Cool in You
- B-side: "For the Cool in You"
- Released: October 4, 1993
- Recorded: 1992–1993
- Genre: R&B; soul
- Length: 4:53
- Label: Epic
- Songwriter: Kenneth "Babyface" Edmonds
- Producers: L.A. Reid; Babyface; Daryl Simmons

Babyface singles chronology
"For the Cool in You" (1993)	"Never Keeping Secrets" (1993)	"And Our Feelings" (1994)

Music video
- "Never Keeping Secrets" on YouTube

"Never Keeping Secrets" is the second single released from American singer, songwriter, and record producer Babyface's third album, For the Cool in You (1993). Written and co-produced by Babyface with L.A. Reid and Daryl Simmons, the single was released in 1993 by Epic Records. It peaked at numbers 15 and 16 on the US Billboard Hot 100 and Cash Box Top 100, and number three on the Billboard R&B Singles chart.

A cover of the song by Spragga Benz and Wayne Wonder reached number one in Jamaica in 1994.

== Charts ==
=== Weekly charts ===
Chart (1993–1994)	Peak position
Iceland (Íslenski Listinn Topp 40)	34
US Billboard Hot 100	15
US Hot R&B/Hip-Hop Songs (Billboard)	3
US Rhythmic Airplay (Billboard)	7
US Cash Box Top 100	16

=== Year-end charts ===
Chart (1994)	Position
US Billboard Hot 100	67
US Hot R&B Singles (Billboard)	8
