= When Can I See You =

1994 single by Babyface

- US CD single

Single by Babyface

from the album For the Cool in You
- Released: May 20, 1994
- Genre: R&B; pop
- Length: 3:49
- Label: Epic
- Songwriter: Kenneth Edmonds
- Producers: Antonio Reid; Kenneth Edmonds; Daryl Simmons

Babyface singles chronology
"Rock Bottom" (1994)	"When Can I See You" (1994)	"Dream Away" (1994)

Music video
- "When Can I See You" on YouTube

"When Can I See You" is a song by American musician Babyface from his third album, For the Cool in You (1993). It was written by Babyface and co-produced by him along with Antonio Reid and Daryl Simmons. Released in May 1994 by Epic Records, the song became Babyface's highest-charting single on the US Billboard Hot 100 chart, peaking at No. 4. The song also peaked at No. 6 on the Billboard Hot R&B Singles chart and at No. 35 on the UK Singles Chart. The song was also included on his greatest hits collection, released in 2000. The song earned Babyface his first performance Grammy Award for Best Male R&B Vocal Performance. It also earned him an nomination in the category for Male R&B/soul single at the 1995 Soul Train Music Awards.

== Critical reception ==
Larry Flick from Billboard magazine wrote, "Just when you think you've heard the best possible single from Babyface's lush For the Cool in You collection, a more potent entry is presented. This time, he reels in his acrobatic delivery and offers a delicate, stirring performance over a spare acoustic pop arrangement. Album version of the track derives its motion from a subtle folk-like percussion, though a fleshier remix is included for R&B radio. Pick either mix, and play it like crazy."

== Music video ==
The accompanying music video for "When Can I See You" was directed by Randee St. Nicholas and filmed in Los Angeles. It was produced by John Hopgood and Michael Trim directed photography on the Planet Pictures production.

== Charts ==
=== Weekly charts ===
Chart (1994)	Peak position
Australia (ARIA)	31
Iceland (Íslenski Listinn Topp 40)	32
New Zealand (Recorded Music NZ)	9
UK Singles (OCC)	35
US Billboard Hot 100	4
US Adult Contemporary (Billboard)	10
US Hot R&B/Hip-Hop Songs (Billboard)	6
US Maxi-Singles Sales (Billboard)	33
US Pop Airplay (Billboard)	4
US Cash Box Top 100	2

=== Year-end charts ===
Chart (1994)	Position
US Billboard Hot 100	26
US Cash Box Top 100	10

== Certifications ==
Region	Certification	Certified units/sales
United States (RIAA)	Gold	500,000^{^}
^{^} Shipments figures based on certification alone.
