= Whip Appeal =

- Cassette cover

Single by Babyface

from the album Tender Lover
- Released: February 22, 1990
- Recorded: 1989
- Genre: R&B
- Length: 5:49 (album version); 4:31 (radio edit)
- Label: SOLAR, Epic
- Songwriters: Babyface, Perri "Pebbles" Reid
- Producers: Babyface, L.A. Reid

Babyface singles chronology
"Tender Lover" (1989)	"Whip Appeal" (1990)	"My Kinda Girl" (1990)

"Whip Appeal" is a song by American musician Babyface. It served as the third single from his second album, Tender Lover (1989). Written by Babyface and Perri "Pebbles" Reid, "Whip Appeal" was released on February 22, 1990 by SOLAR Records and Epic Records.

== Reception ==
"Whip Appeal" peaked at number six on the US Billboard Hot 100 singles chart in April 1990. It also reached number two on the Hot R&B/Hip-Hop Songs chart and number 39 in Canada. The song received a Grammy Award nomination in the Best R&B Vocal Performance, Male category and a Soul Train Music Award nomination in the Best R&B/Soul Single, Male category. In a 1990 Newsday article, journalist John Leland described the song as "suggestive but not rude" and called it "the risque love ballad that has eluded Prince the last few years." This version finished at #83 on Billboard's year-end chart for 1990. Rolling Stone said that the song had a quiet storm style.

== Music video ==
Babyface met Tracey Edmonds, his wife from 1992 to 2005, when she auditioned for a role in the "Whip Appeal" music video. "She made it but couldn't be in it because she got the chicken pox. I didn't see her again for a couple months," Babyface said. During casting for his next video, "My Kinda Girl", he recalled asking, "'Do you remember the girl who caught the chicken pox? She was real pretty.' The very next day, Tracey, her mom and brother happened to be driving down the street that I was on. It was like a 'meant to be' kind of thing." The video features actress Holly Robinson Peete, who introduces herself as 'Holly Robinson', as the sultry radio host at the beginning of the video. The music video was directed by Jim Yukich, who previously directed many videos for Phil Collins as well as his band Genesis.

== Other versions ==
- Jazz musician Charles Earland recorded a cover version of "Whip Appeal" which served as the title track from his 1990 album.
- R&B group The Whispers performed the song on their 1997 album, Songbook, Vol. 1: The Songs of Babyface.
- Vesta Williams covered it on her 2007 album Distant Lover.
- "Whip Appeal" was also interpolated in an unreleased Frank Ocean single.

== Charts ==
=== Weekly charts ===
Chart (1990)	Peak position
Canada Top Singles (RPM)	39
US Billboard Hot 100	6
US Adult Contemporary (Billboard)	36
US Hot Black Singles (Billboard)	2
US Cash Box Top 100	5

=== Year-end charts ===
Chart (1990)	Position
US Billboard Hot 100	83
US Hot Black Singles (Billboard)	49
