= Face2Face (Babyface album) =

Studio album by Babyface
- Released: September 11, 2001
- Length: 58:58
- Labels: Nu America; Arista
- Producers: Babyface; Buckwild; Mike City; Heavy D; Brion James; Megahertz; Anthony Nance; The Neptunes; Tim & Bob

Babyface chronology
| Love Songs (2001) | Face2Face (2001) | The Essential Babyface (2003) |

Singles from Face2Face
- 1. "There She Goes" Released: June 19, 2001; 2. "What If" Released: June 19, 2001

Face2Face is the fifth studio album by American singer Babyface. It was released by Nu America and Arista Records on September 11, 2001, in the United States. Babyface's first album in five years and his debut with Arista, reuniting him with L.A. Reid, then the label's president, Face2Face marked a shift from his signature ballads to a more uptempo sound and featured outside producers on several tracks, including Tim & Bob, Heavy D, The Neptunes, Buckwild, Mike City, and Megahertz.

The album received mixed reviews, as both critics and fans were divided over Babyface's shift in musical direction. Released in the shadow of the September 11 attacks, Face2Face became his lowest-charting release since his debut (1986), peaking at number 25 on the US Billboard 200, while reaching number eight on the Top R&B/Hip-Hop Albums chart. Domestic sales of 371,000 units were contrasted by a platinum certification in Japan. Lead single "There She Goes" reached number 31 on the US Billboard Hot 100, while follow-up "What If" became a top five hit on the R&B/Hip-Hop chart.

== Background ==
In 1996, Babyface released The Day, his third studio album with Epic Records. The album reached number six on the US Billboard 200 and sold over 1.5 million copies. Singles such as the Shalamar cover "This Is for the Lover in You" and follow-up "Every Time I Close My Eyes" helped introduce him to an increasingly international audience. Christmas with Babyface (1998), his next effort, would mark his final album for Epic. For his next project, the singer moved to Arista Records, reuniting him with his former songwriting and production partner L.A. Reid who was the president of the label at the time of the album's release.

Face2Face was a radical departure from his previous works, as the balladeer was focused on more uptempo songs. The album was also different due to Babyface working with outside producers on roughly half of the album, including Tim & Bob, Heavy D, The Neptunes, Diggin' in the Crates producer Buckwild, Brian McKnight's associate producer Anthony Nance and Dan Reed Network member Brion James. Babyface described the experience of making the album as transformative and exhilarating, noting that he experimented with a variety of new approaches — something he considered both refreshing and essential. Lyrically, he noted, the record deals with "real life in very conversational ways, the way people would actually talk. It's a little bit different than things before. It's not your typical Babyface."

== Critical reception ==
Professional ratings
Review scores
| Source | Rating |
|---|---|
| AllMusic | 4.5/5 stars |
| Robert Christgau | A− |
| Entertainment Weekly | D |
| Los Angeles Times | 3/4 stars |
| MTV Asia | 8/10 |
| Rolling Stone | 1/5 stars |
| Slant Magazine | 1.5/5 stars |
| USA Today | 3.5/4 stars |

The album received largely polarizing reviews. AllMusic editor Stephen Thomas Erlewine called Face2Face "a gleaming, stylish platter of urban funk and smooth soul that is easily among his very best records [...] The grooves here cut deeper and are flashier than ever before, and the sweet croon of his voice just makes them seem deeper [...] Babyface has never been in better form, and from beginning to end, this record captures him at the peak of his powers." Marc Weingarten, writing for The Los Angeles Times, felt that Face2Face "nicely balances classic soul arrangements with swatches of hip-hop flavor, but it's Babyface, whose pretty voice flutters and swoops like Al Green's, who holds the album in a suspended state of grace." Robert Christgau remarked that Babyface "has been funky on demand since The Deele, and the showcase tracks up front are as tricky as any to surface all year – just when you think you've balanced all five or six elements in your mind's ear, up pops number six or seven. He leaves the tricks behind eventually, if only so as not to alienate his normal market share, and after bottoming out briefly returns with enough ballads to make you stop humming "What If" until it goes platinum."

PopMatters critic Mark Anthony Neal wrote: "Given expectations associated with an artist of Babyface's caliber, Face2Face break little new ground and despite attempts to re-cast him, the recording finds the artist in stasis. For what it is Face2Face is a quality recording, in the vein of anything done by Case, Joe, or Jesse Powell, but audiences have come to expect so much more from Babyface." Sal Cinquemani from Slant Magazine found that Face2Face "falls short of stellar." While he applauded "There She Goes" and "Baby's Mama," Cinquemani called the rest of the album "just downright dull." Entertainment Weekly editor Craig Seymour wrote that "on his eighth album, the R&B veteran comes across like Frankenface, a poorly executed composite intended to appeal to a younger fan base. He sports a Lenny Kravitz-ish Afro, employs a Maxwell-like falsetto, and uses hip-hop beats from The Neptunes. In all, it's an unconvincing attempt at reinvention, and a monstrous waste of talent and time." Rolling Stone declared Face2Face a "painful grab for street cred."

== Commercial performance ==
Face2Face is notable for being one of a few albums released on the same day as the September 11 attacks, along with other recordings such as Slayer's God Hates Us All, Jay-Z's The Blueprint, The Microphones' The Glow Pt. 2, Dream Theater's Live Scenes from New York, Mariah Carey's Glitter, Fabolous's Ghetto Fabolous and Nickelback's Silver Side Up. The album debuted and peaked at number 25 on the US Billboard 200, with first week sales of 55,000 copies. With the exception of Christmas with Babyface, it marked his lowest-charting release since his debut. By August 2005, it had sold 371,000 units domestically. Commenting on the album's commercial underperformance, Babyface also commented in 2005: "The actual process was amazing. I did mixed things on that, which was good. You can always learn. It's still a very important record in my career. Things I learned about singing differently, messing around with how a song might flow differently… I wouldn’t have been able to grow without doing that record."

== Track listing ==
Face2Face track listing
| No. | Title | Writer(s) | Producer(s) | Length |
|---|---|---|---|---|
| 1. | "Outside In/Inside Out" | Kenneth Edmonds; Michael Flowers | Babyface; Mike City | 3:16 |
| 2. | "There She Goes" | K. Edmonds; Chad Hugo; Pharrell Williams | The Neptunes | 4:31 |
| 3. | "What If" | K. Edmonds | Babyface | 4:07 |
| 4. | "Stressed Out" | K. Edmonds; Hugo; Williams | The Neptunes | 3:35 |
| 5. | "Baby's Mama" (featuring Snoop Dogg) | Calvin Broadus; K. Edmonds; Dorsey Wesley; Damon Thomas | Megahertz | 3:55 |
| 6. | "How Can U Be Down" | K. Edmonds | Babyface | 4:41 |
| 7. | "Work It Out" | K. Edmonds; Tim Kelley; Bob Robinson | Babyface; Tim & Bob | 4:11 |
| 8. | "I Keep Callin'" | K. Edmonds; Heavy D; Brion James; Anthony Nance | Babyface; Heavy D | 4:29 |
| 9. | "With Him" | K. Edmonds | Babyface | 4:45 |
| 10. | "Wish U Was My Girl" | Jason Edmonds; K. Edmonds | Babyface | 4:02 |
| 11. | "U Should Know" | J. Edmonds; K. Edmonds | Babyface | 3:52 |
| 12. | "Don't Take It So Personal" | Edmonds; James; Nance | Babyface; Nance; James | 3:43 |
| 13. | "Still in Love with U" | J. Edmonds; K. Edmonds | Babyface | 4:00 |
| 14. | "Lover and Friend" | Anthony Best; J. Edmonds; K. Edmonds | Babyface; Buckwild | 5:51 |
| Total length: | | | | 58:58 |

Japan bonus track
| No. | Title | Writer(s) | Producer(s) | Length |
|---|---|---|---|---|
| 15. | "Just My Imagination (Running Away with Me)" (with Gwyneth Paltrow) | Norman Whitfield; Barrett Strong | Babyface | 4:10 |
| Total length: | | | | 63:08 |

== Personnel ==
Credits adapted from the album's liner notes.

- Keyboard programming – Babyface, The Neptunes, Mike City, Megahertz, Heavy D, Anthony Nance, Brion James, Tim Kelley
- Drum programming – Tim Kelley, Anthony Nance, Buckwild, The Neptunes, Mike City
- Bass – Babyface
- Acoustic guitar – Babyface
- Electric guitar – Babyface, Bob Robinson, Brion James
- Wurlitzer and Fender Rhodes – Wayne Lindsey
- Hammond B-3 organ – Bob Robinson
- Background vocals – Babyface, Mike City, Pharrell Williams, Latrelle Simmons
- Recording – Paul Boutin, Brian Garten
- Mixing – Jean Marie Horvat, Josean Posey, Edward Quesada, Derek Carlson
- Executive producer – Antonio "L.A." Reid
- Photography – Christian Lantry, Sante D'Orazio
- Art direction, design – Gravillis, Inc.

== Charts ==
=== Weekly charts ===
Weekly chart performance for Face2Face
| Chart (2001) | Peak position |
|---|---|
| Japanese Albums (Oricon) | 13 |
| US Billboard 200 | 25 |
| US Top R&B/Hip-Hop Albums (Billboard) | 8 |

=== Year-end charts ===
Year-end chart performance for Face2Face
| Chart (2001) | Position |
|---|---|
| US Top R&B/Hip-Hop Albums (Billboard) | 98 |

== Certifications ==
Certifications for Face2Face
| Region | Certification | Certified units/sales |
|---|---|---|
| Japan (RIAJ) | Platinum | 200,000^{^} |
^{^} Shipments figures based on certification alone.
