= Michael Jackson: The Immortal World Tour =

2011–14 tour by Cirque du Soleil

- Tour by Cirque du Soleil
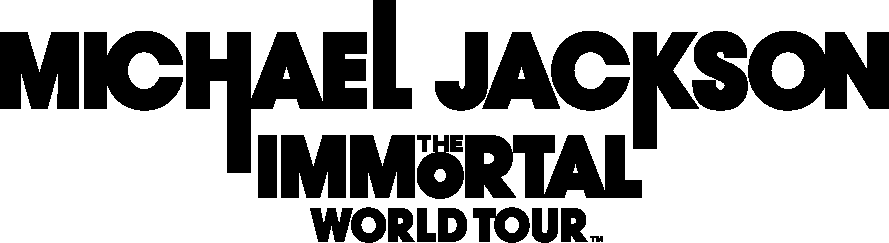
- Logo for Michael Jackson: The Immortal World Tour by Cirque du Soleil
- Start date: October 2, 2011
- End date: August 31, 2014
- Legs: 4
- No. of shows: 227 in North America; 18 in Latin America; 85 in Europe; 49 in Asia; 22 in Oceania; 501 in total
- Box office: $371 million

Cirque du Soleil concert chronology
- Iris (2011); Michael Jackson: The Immortal World Tour (2011–14); Amaluna (2012)

Michael Jackson: The Immortal World Tour was the first of two theatrical productions by Cirque du Soleil to combine the music of Michael Jackson with Cirque du Soleil's signature acrobatic performance style. The show was written and directed by Jamie King and produced in partnership with the Estate of Michael Jackson. The arena show—which is very similar to a rock concert—began its tour on October 2, 2011, in Montreal. After touring North America for one year, Immortal continued through Europe, Asia, Australia, New Zealand and the Middle East before returning to North America in February 2014 for a total of 501 shows from 141 cities. It is the most financially successful Cirque production and highest grossing tribute show in history.

By December 2011, just two months after it was launched, the show had sold over $100 million in tickets from US and Canada dates and became the top touring act in America, according to Forbes. The tour wrapped in mid-2014 after amassing $371 million in revenue with ticket sales of 3.7 million from 27 countries ranking the tour as the eighth highest-grossing tour of all time.

== Public reception ==
The show attracted numerous celebrities such as Brad Pitt, Angelina Jolie, Jay-Z, Beyoncé Knowles, Rihanna, Eva Longoria, Courteney Cox, Josh Groban, Jennifer Lopez, Tyra Banks, Naomi Campbell, the cast of Glee, Andrew Garfield, Emma Stone and Cee-lo Green.

== Background and development ==
On November 2, 2010, Cirque du Soleil and Jackson's estate announced the development of the Immortal World Tour through Jackson's official website. In a press release, the company stated, "A riveting fusion of visuals, dance, music and fantasy that immerses audiences in Michael's creative world and literally turns his signature moves upside down, Michael Jackson: The Immortal World Tour unfolds Michael Jackson's artistry before the eyes of the audience. Aimed at lifelong fans as well as those experiencing Michael's creative genius for the first time, the show captures the essence, soul and inspiration of the King of Pop, celebrating a legacy that continues to transcend generations".

Director Jamie King, who had previously spearheaded tours by Britney Spears (The Circus Tour), Madonna (Sticky & Sweet Tour), Celine Dion (Taking Chances World Tour) and Rihanna (Last Girl on Earth), stated that he wanted to include Jackson's "giving tree" as the focus of the tour.

As noted during an interview with Daniel Lamare, within 24 hours of opening ticket sales for the show, Cirque du Soleil sold 200,000 tickets.

Following the commercial and critical success of the show, a second Cirque du Soleil production based on Jackson's music titled Michael Jackson: One was developed for a permanent residency show at the Mandalay Bay Resort and Casino in Las Vegas. This second show opened in May 2013 to critical acclaim and commercial success.

== Acts ==
The acts of the Immortal World Tour were staged to the music of Michael Jackson. Cirque gathered a creative team of 10 high-profile choreographers, some of whom worked with Jackson, to design the acts.

- Childhood: The Mime awakens the inhabitants.
- Wanna Be Startin' Somethin': Dance and acrobatic number.
- Fanatics – Shake Your Body (Down to the Ground): Five fanatics take pictures of the audience and try to get into the gates of Neverland.
- Dancing Machine: Welders perform on motorized cables.
- Ben: A celebration of Jackson's love of animals.
- This Place Hotel: Aerial tango.
- Smooth Criminal: Dance routine.
- Dangerous: Pole-dancing act.
- Fanatics – The Jackson 5 Medley: The fanatics are in a competition and are granted access to Neverland.
- Mime: Mime gains the talents of Jackson and performs beatbox.
- Human Nature: Aerial hoops.
- Scary Story – Is It Scary: Contortion act.
- Bats – Threatened: Aerial act.
- Thriller: Free-running parkour act.
- Swans – I Just Can't Stop Loving You: Straps duo act.
- Beat It: The Fanatics manipulate Jackson's iconic accessories.
- Jam: Hip-hop dance choreography with basketballs.
- Earth Song: Mime is tangled in the tree, which is now turned upside down.
- Scream: Tumbling (men's rhythmic gymnastics) and aerial act.
- Gone Too Soon: The Mime cradles four horses in this ballad.
- They Don't Care About Us: Dance choreography.
- Heal the World / Will You Be There: Artists descend onto the stage with glowing red hearts.
- I'll Be There: The 11-year-old voice of Jackson and a single piano track.
- Megamix – Can You Feel It/Don't Stop 'Til You Get Enough/Billie Jean/Black or White: Swiss rings act, dance choreography, and world dance styles.
- Man in the Mirror: This finale is a celebration of Jackson.

== Costumes ==
Zaldy Goco, the tour's costume designer, said the following in regard to his inspiration for the collection of 252 costumes: "My approach has been to draw upon and respect Michael's iconic style while creating something new and fresh. I placed subtle references throughout the costumes in the show." The color palette chosen for the show is rich, lively, and ornate such as through the usage of gold and crystals. The design team explored such technologies as 3D printing and LED lighting for the many different colored pieces.

Highlights of the costumes range from 3D printing techniques to pyrotechnics being built into the designs.

- Gangster characters wield 3D-printed surreal guns that shoot pyrotechnics when the triggers are pulled. The shoulder pads are also 3D-printed.
- The straps duo costumes are covered in Swarovski crystals and were inspired by Jackson's corseted wrist in the "Black or White" music video.
- The bat costumes are created using ultra lightweight paper used for shipping parcels.
- The soldiers' costumes are primarily made of mytex on a polyester frame with padding.
- All the costumes for the "Human Nature" act are equipped with more than 275 LED lights.
- The costumes for the welders were inspired by the red, zipper-clad jacket in "Beat It".

== Music ==
On October 3, 2011, Sony Music Entertainment announced that more than 40 of Jackson's original recordings were redesigned and reimagined by Justin Timberlake and Rihanna producer Kevin Antunes throughout a year-period work in the studio with original multi-track master recordings. Hence it's expected that Immortal will continue a similar mixing production to the soundtracks to previous Cirque du Soleil shows: 2006's Love, with the remixed music of The Beatles (to the show of the same name), and 2010's Elvis Presley-themed remix soundtrack Viva Elvis (to the show of the same name).

Released by Epic Records in conjunction with estate of Michael Jackson, Immortal features an alternative version of the Jackson 5 song "ABC", as well as a series of mashups and remixes such as a choir-assisted rendition of "They Don't Care About Us". Although more than 60 songs were used for the stage show, the album release made available is a 20-track album or a deluxe 27-track album only. More than 2 million copies of the Immortal album have been sold worldwide.

== Setlist ==
The following songs were performed in the tour:

- "Opening Megamix": "Dirty Diana" / "Get on the Floor" / "P.Y.T. (Pretty Young Thing)" / "Heartbreaker" / "The Way You Make Me Feel" / "You Rock My World" / "Unbreakable" / "Blood on the Dance Floor" / "Baby Be Mine" / "Rock with You" / "Lovely One" / "Burn This Disco Out" (pre-show music)
- "Workin' Day and Night"
- "The Immortal Intro" (video interlude) *
- "Childhood"
- "Wanna Be Startin' Somethin'"
- "The Jackson 5 Medley": "I Want You Back" / "ABC" / "The Love You Save" (placed after "Mime Segment" on the album; only on selected days)
- "Shake Your Body (Down to the Ground)" (only on selected days)
- "Dancing Machine" / "Blame It on the Boogie" / "Why You Wanna Trip on Me"
- "Ben"
- "This Place Hotel"
- "Smooth Criminal"
- "Dangerous" / "In the Closet"
- "The Mime Segment": "(I Like) The Way You Love Me" / "Hollywood Tonight" / "Speed Demon" / "Slave to the Rhythm" / "Stranger in Moscow" / "Another Part of Me"
- "Speechless" / "Human Nature"
- "Is It Scary" / "Ghosts" / "Somebody's Watching Me" / "Monster" / "Threatened" ("Threatened" was only on selected days)
- "Thriller"
- "You Are Not Alone" / "I Just Can't Stop Loving You"
- "Beat It" / "State of Shock"
- "Jam"
- "Earth Song" / "Planet Earth"
- "Scream" / "Little Susie"
- "Gone Too Soon" (only on selected days)
- "They Don't Care About Us" / "Privacy" / "Tabloid Junkie"
- "Heal the World" / "Will You Be There"
- "I'll Be There" (video interlude)
- "Immortal Megamix": "Can You Feel It" / "Don't Stop 'Til You Get Enough" / "Billie Jean" / "Black or White"
- "Man in the Mirror"
- "Remember the Time" / "Bad" (curtain call music)

*Also includes: "Goin' Back to Indiana" / "Rockin' Robin" / "I Got the Feelin'"

== Shows ==
List of concerts, showing date, city, country, venue, tickets sold, number of available tickets and amount of gross revenue
Date	City	Country/Region	Venue	Attendance	Revenue
North America
October 2, 2011	Montreal	Canada	Bell Centre	—N/a	—N/a
October 3, 2011	Montreal	Canada	Bell Centre	—N/a	—N/a
October 4, 2011	Montreal	Canada	Bell Centre	—N/a	—N/a
October 7, 2011	Ottawa	Canada	Scotiabank Place	—N/a	—N/a
October 8, 2011	Ottawa	Canada	Scotiabank Place	—N/a	—N/a
October 9, 2011	Ottawa	Canada	Scotiabank Place	—N/a	—N/a
October 12, 2011	Hamilton	Canada	Copps Coliseum	—N/a	—N/a
October 13, 2011	Hamilton	Canada	Copps Coliseum	—N/a	—N/a
October 15, 2011	Detroit	United States	Joe Louis Arena	—N/a	—N/a
October 16, 2011	Detroit	United States	Joe Louis Arena	—N/a	—N/a
October 18, 2011	London	Canada	John Labatt Centre	—N/a	—N/a
October 19, 2011	London	Canada	John Labatt Centre	—N/a	—N/a
October 21, 2011	Toronto	Canada	Air Canada Centre	—N/a	—N/a
October 22, 2011	Toronto	Canada	Air Canada Centre	—N/a	—N/a
October 23, 2011	Toronto	Canada	Air Canada Centre	—N/a	—N/a
October 24, 2011	Toronto	Canada	Air Canada Centre	—N/a	—N/a
October 26, 2011	Winnipeg	Canada	MTS Centre	—N/a	—N/a
October 27, 2011	Winnipeg	Canada	MTS Centre	—N/a	—N/a
October 29, 2011	Saskatoon	Canada	Credit Union Centre	—N/a	—N/a
October 30, 2011	Saskatoon	Canada	Credit Union Centre	—N/a	—N/a
November 1, 2011	Edmonton	Canada	Rexall Place	19,131 / 25,346	$2,482,170
November 2, 2011	Edmonton	Canada	Rexall Place	19,131 / 25,346	$2,482,170
November 4, 2011	Vancouver	Canada	Rogers Arena	32,589 / 39,441	$3,905,970
November 5, 2011	Vancouver	Canada	Rogers Arena	32,589 / 39,441	$3,905,970
November 6, 2011	Vancouver	Canada	Rogers Arena	32,589 / 39,441	$3,905,970
November 9, 2011	Seattle	United States	KeyArena	14,531 / 21,754	$1,704,425
November 10, 2011	Seattle	United States	KeyArena	14,531 / 21,754	$1,704,425
November 12, 2011	Spokane	United States	Spokane Veterans Memorial Arena	—N/a	—N/a
November 13, 2011	Spokane	United States	Spokane Veterans Memorial Arena	—N/a	—N/a
November 15, 2011	Eugene	United States	Matthew Knight Arena	3,869 / 6,919	$459,033
November 18, 2011	Portland	United States	Rose Garden Arena	—N/a	—N/a
November 19, 2011	Portland	United States	Rose Garden Arena	—N/a	—N/a
November 28, 2011	Salt Lake City	United States	EnergySolutions Arena	—N/a	—N/a
November 29, 2011	Salt Lake City	United States	EnergySolutions Arena	—N/a	—N/a
November 30, 2011	Salt Lake City	United States	EnergySolutions Arena	—N/a	—N/a
December 3, 2011	Las Vegas	United States	Mandalay Bay Events Center	140,019 / 260,640	$14,475,909
December 4, 2011	Las Vegas	United States	Mandalay Bay Events Center	140,019 / 260,640	$14,475,909
December 9, 2011	Las Vegas	United States	Mandalay Bay Events Center	140,019 / 260,640	$14,475,909
December 11, 2011	Las Vegas	United States	Mandalay Bay Events Center	140,019 / 260,640	$14,475,909
December 17, 2011	Las Vegas	United States	Mandalay Bay Events Center	140,019 / 260,640	$14,475,909
December 18, 2011	Las Vegas	United States	Mandalay Bay Events Center	140,019 / 260,640	$14,475,909
December 19, 2011	Las Vegas	United States	Mandalay Bay Events Center	140,019 / 260,640	$14,475,909
December 27, 2011	Las Vegas	United States	Mandalay Bay Events Center	140,019 / 260,640	$14,475,909
December 30, 2011	Phoenix	United States	US Airways Center	16,149 / 23,162	$1,825,233
December 31, 2011	Phoenix	United States	US Airways Center	16,149 / 23,162	$1,825,233
January 3, 2012	Boise	United States	Taco Bell Arena	5,647 / 6,525	$603,818
January 6, 2012	Denver	United States	Pepsi Center	23,078 / 25,614	$2,552,443
January 7, 2012	Denver	United States	Pepsi Center	23,078 / 25,614	$2,552,443
January 8, 2012	Denver	United States	Pepsi Center	23,078 / 25,614	$2,552,443
January 10, 2012	Sacramento	United States	Power Balance Pavilion	13,507 / 19,948	$1,323,679
January 11, 2012	Sacramento	United States	Power Balance Pavilion	13,507 / 19,948	$1,323,679
January 13, 2012	San Jose	United States	HP Pavilion at San Jose	27,537 / 32,976	$3,281,784
January 14, 2012	San Jose	United States	HP Pavilion at San Jose	27,537 / 32,976	$3,281,784
January 15, 2012	San Jose	United States	HP Pavilion at San Jose	27,537 / 32,976	$3,281,784
January 17, 2012	Oakland	United States	Oracle Arena	31,785 / 35,814	$3,448,610
January 18, 2012	Oakland	United States	Oracle Arena	31,785 / 35,814	$3,448,610
January 19, 2012	Oakland	United States	Oracle Arena	31,785 / 35,814	$3,448,610
January 21, 2012	San Diego	United States	Valley View Casino Center	14,928 / 19,844	$1,609,176
January 22, 2012	San Diego	United States	Valley View Casino Center	14,928 / 19,844	$1,609,176
January 24, 2012	Anaheim	United States	Honda Center	12,979 / 18,528	$1,481,242
January 25, 2012	Anaheim	United States	Honda Center	12,979 / 18,528	$1,481,242
January 27, 2012	Los Angeles	United States	Staples Center	31,632 / 35,814	$3,867,569
January 28, 2012	Los Angeles	United States	Staples Center	31,632 / 35,814	$3,867,569
January 29, 2012	Los Angeles	United States	Staples Center	31,632 / 35,814	$3,867,569
February 7, 2012	St. Louis	United States	Scottrade Center	11,989 / 20,508	$1,161,543
February 8, 2012	St. Louis	United States	Scottrade Center	11,989 / 20,508	$1,161,543
February 10, 2012	Houston	United States	Toyota Center	30,548 / 33,018	$3,627,938
February 11, 2012	Houston	United States	Toyota Center	30,548 / 33,018	$3,627,938
February 12, 2012	Houston	United States	Toyota Center	30,548 / 33,018	$3,627,938
February 15, 2012	New Orleans	United States	New Orleans Arena	12,097 / 23,278	$1,264,312
February 16, 2012	New Orleans	United States	New Orleans Arena	12,097 / 23,278	$1,264,312
February 18, 2012	Tulsa	United States	BOK Center	10,212 / 21,818	$1,156,139
February 19, 2012	Tulsa	United States	BOK Center	10,212 / 21,818	$1,156,139
February 21, 2012	Kansas City	United States	Sprint Center	14,922 / 22,334	$1,546,350
February 22, 2012	Kansas City	United States	Sprint Center	14,922 / 22,334	$1,546,350
February 24, 2012	Indianapolis	United States	Bankers Life Fieldhouse	13,975 / 20,844	$1,707,418
February 25, 2012	Indianapolis	United States	Bankers Life Fieldhouse	13,975 / 20,844	$1,707,418
February 28, 2012	Orlando	United States	Amway Center	19,288 / 21,780	$2,200,201
February 29, 2012	Orlando	United States	Amway Center	19,288 / 21,780	$2,200,201
March 2, 2012	Miami	United States	American Airlines Arena	35,105 / 37,974	$4,296,135
March 3, 2012	Miami	United States	American Airlines Arena	35,105 / 37,974	$4,296,135
March 4, 2012	Miami	United States	American Airlines Arena	35,105 / 37,974	$4,296,135
March 7, 2012	Jacksonville	United States	Jacksonville Veterans Memorial Arena	9,463 / 12,246	$905,144
March 8, 2012	Jacksonville	United States	Jacksonville Veterans Memorial Arena	9,463 / 12,246	$905,144
March 10, 2012	Raleigh	United States	RBC Center	12,793 / 21,296	$1,376,253
March 11, 2012	Raleigh	United States	RBC Center	12,793 / 21,296	$1,376,253
March 13, 2012	Charlotte	United States	Time Warner Cable Arena	10,369 / 24,824	$1,100,604
March 14, 2012	Charlotte	United States	Time Warner Cable Arena	10,369 / 24,824	$1,100,604
March 16, 2012	Milwaukee	United States	BMO Harris Bradley Center	13,828 / 23,730	$1,518,631
March 17, 2012	Milwaukee	United States	BMO Harris Bradley Center	13,828 / 23,730	$1,518,631
March 20, 2012	Montreal	Canada	Bell Centre	28,504 / 38,415	$3,646,620
March 21, 2012	Montreal	Canada	Bell Centre	28,504 / 38,415	$3,646,620
March 22, 2012	Montreal	Canada	Bell Centre	28,504 / 38,415	$3,646,620
March 24, 2012	Quebec City	Canada	Colisée Pepsi	14,090 / 18,238	$1,719,960
March 25, 2012	Quebec City	Canada	Colisée Pepsi	14,090 / 18,238	$1,719,960
March 27, 2012	Minneapolis	United States	Target Center	16,204 / 20,098	$1,775,154
March 28, 2012	Minneapolis	United States	Target Center	16,204 / 20,098	$1,775,154
March 30, 2012	Newark	United States	Prudential Center	24,452 / 32,709	$2,662,658
April 1, 2012	Newark	United States	Prudential Center	24,452 / 32,709	$2,662,658
April 3, 2012	New York City	United States	Madison Square Garden	29,007 / 33,081	$3,794,245
April 4, 2012	New York City	United States	Madison Square Garden	29,007 / 33,081	$3,794,245
April 5, 2012	New York City	United States	Madison Square Garden	29,007 / 33,081	$3,794,245
April 7, 2012	Uniondale	United States	Nassau Veterans Memorial Coliseum	16,935 / 22,470	$1,823,742
April 8, 2012	Uniondale	United States	Nassau Veterans Memorial Coliseum	16,935 / 22,470	$1,823,742
April 10, 2012	Philadelphia	United States	Wells Fargo Center	19,174 / 23,732	$2,363,651
April 11, 2012	Philadelphia	United States	Wells Fargo Center	19,174 / 23,732	$2,363,651
April 13, 2012	Pittsburgh	United States	Petersen Events Center	15,645 / 19,821	$1,301,898
April 14, 2012	Pittsburgh	United States	Petersen Events Center	15,645 / 19,821	$1,301,898
April 15, 2012	Pittsburgh	United States	Petersen Events Center	15,645 / 19,821	$1,301,898
April 24, 2012	University Park	United States	Bryce Jordan Center	4,575 / 11,003	$482,617
April 27, 2012	Columbia	United States	Colonial Life Arena	7,979 / 15,500	$707,395
April 28, 2012	Columbia	United States	Colonial Life Arena	7,979 / 15,500	$707,395
May 2, 2012	Hartford	United States	XL Center	14,030 / 20,770	$1,571,574
May 3, 2012	Hartford	United States	XL Center	14,030 / 20,770	$1,571,574
May 5, 2012	Baltimore	United States	1st Mariner Arena	17,819 / 21,526	$2,086,549
May 6, 2012	Baltimore	United States	1st Mariner Arena	17,819 / 21,526	$2,086,549
May 8, 2012	Hampton	United States	Hampton Coliseum	7,289 / 10,832	$731,757
May 9, 2012	Hampton	United States	Hampton Coliseum	7,289 / 10,832	$731,757
May 11, 2012	Greenville	United States	BI-LO Center	4,215 / 7,466	$380,280
May 16, 2012	Worcester	United States	DCU Center	11,223 / 17,022	$1,220,535
May 17, 2012	Worcester	United States	DCU Center	11,223 / 17,022	$1,220,535
May 19, 2012	Quebec City	Canada	Colisée Pepsi	4,079 / 11,972	$423,305
May 20, 2012	Quebec City	Canada	Colisée Pepsi	4,079 / 11,972	$423,305
May 22, 2012	Albany	United States	Times Union Center	5,475 / 9,376	$516,663
May 25, 2012	Cincinnati	United States	U.S. Bank Arena	6,031 / 8,510	$577,376
June 6, 2012	Dayton	United States	Nutter Center	7,635 / 16,470	$748,944
June 7, 2012	Dayton	United States	Nutter Center	7,635 / 16,470	$748,944
June 9, 2012	Columbus	United States	Value City Arena	14,124 / 20,984	$1,465,358
June 10, 2012	Columbus	United States	Value City Arena	14,124 / 20,984	$1,465,358
June 12, 2012	Nashville	United States	Bridgestone Arena	11,277 / 19,234	$1,055,507
June 13, 2012	Nashville	United States	Bridgestone Arena	11,277 / 19,234	$1,055,507
June 15, 2012	Austin	United States	Frank Erwin Center	8,756 / 10,535	$1,106,902
June 20, 2012	Memphis	United States	FedExForum	3,901 / 10,972	$407,078
June 23, 2012	San Antonio	United States	AT&T Center	10,028 / 11,272	$1,121,252
June 26, 2012	Dallas	United States	American Airlines Center	16,454 / 22,184	$1,807,601
June 27, 2012	Dallas	United States	American Airlines Center	16,454 / 22,184	$1,807,601
June 29, 2012	Atlanta	United States	Philips Arena	25,592 / 36,486	$2,901,224
June 30, 2012	Atlanta	United States	Philips Arena	25,592 / 36,486	$2,901,224
July 1, 2012	Atlanta	United States	Philips Arena	25,592 / 36,486	$2,901,224
July 6, 2012	Montreal	Canada	Bell Centre	20,128 / 25,610	$2,428,050
July 7, 2012	Montreal	Canada	Bell Centre	20,128 / 25,610	$2,428,050
July 11, 2012	Hershey	United States	Giant Center	6,085 / 8,058	$553,272
July 13, 2012	Washington, D.C.	United States	Verizon Center	30,203 / 34,260	$3,916,511
July 14, 2012	Washington, D.C.	United States	Verizon Center	30,203 / 34,260	$3,916,511
July 15, 2012	Washington, D.C.	United States	Verizon Center	30,203 / 34,260	$3,916,511
July 17, 2012	Cleveland	United States	Quicken Loans Arena	14,270 / 21,964	$1,514,927
July 18, 2012	Cleveland	United States	Quicken Loans Arena	14,270 / 21,964	$1,514,927
July 20, 2012	Chicago	United States	United Center	22,177 / 24,226	$2,658,416
July 21, 2012	Chicago	United States	United Center	22,177 / 24,226	$2,658,416
July 24, 2012	Ottawa	Canada	Scotiabank Place	12,883 / 23,796	$1,233,900
July 25, 2012	Ottawa	Canada	Scotiabank Place	12,883 / 23,796	$1,233,900
July 27, 2012	Toronto	Canada	Air Canada Centre	20,684 / 23,310	$2,422,040
July 28, 2012	Toronto	Canada	Air Canada Centre	20,684 / 23,310	$2,422,040
July 31, 2012	Buffalo	United States	First Niagara Center	5,483 / 7,730	$521,914
August 3, 2012	Boston	United States	TD Garden	21,802 / 22,440	$2,481,710
August 4, 2012	Boston	United States	TD Garden	21,802 / 22,440	$2,481,710
August 10, 2012	Vancouver	Canada	Rogers Arena	15,456 / 24,628	$1,667,240
August 11, 2012	Vancouver	Canada	Rogers Arena	15,456 / 24,628	$1,667,240
August 14, 2012	Los Angeles	United States	Staples Center	17,975 / 24,578	$2,005,380
August 15, 2012	Los Angeles	United States	Staples Center	17,975 / 24,578	$2,005,380
Latin America
August 24, 2012	Mexico City	Mexico	Palacio de los Deportes	163,261 / 199,556	$13,234,000
August 25, 2012	Mexico City	Mexico	Palacio de los Deportes	163,261 / 199,556	$13,234,000
August 26, 2012	Mexico City	Mexico	Palacio de los Deportes	163,261 / 199,556	$13,234,000
August 28, 2012	Mexico City	Mexico	Palacio de los Deportes	163,261 / 199,556	$13,234,000
August 29, 2012	Mexico City	Mexico	Palacio de los Deportes	163,261 / 199,556	$13,234,000
August 30, 2012	Mexico City	Mexico	Palacio de los Deportes	163,261 / 199,556	$13,234,000
August 31, 2012	Mexico City	Mexico	Palacio de los Deportes	163,261 / 199,556	$13,234,000
September 1, 2012	Mexico City	Mexico	Palacio de los Deportes	163,261 / 199,556	$13,234,000
September 2, 2012	Mexico City	Mexico	Palacio de los Deportes	163,261 / 199,556	$13,234,000
Europe
October 12, 2012	London	England	The O_{2} Arena	78,777 / 78,777	$7,290,450
October 13, 2012	London	England	The O_{2} Arena	78,777 / 78,777	$7,290,450
October 14, 2012	London	England	The O_{2} Arena	78,777 / 78,777	$7,290,450
October 16, 2012	London	England	The O_{2} Arena	78,777 / 78,777	$7,290,450
October 17, 2012	London	England	The O_{2} Arena	78,777 / 78,777	$7,290,450
October 19, 2012	London	England	The O_{2} Arena	78,777 / 78,777	$7,290,450
October 20, 2012	London	England	The O_{2} Arena	78,777 / 78,777	$7,290,450
October 21, 2012	London	England	The O_{2} Arena	78,777 / 78,777	$7,290,450
October 24, 2012	Herning	Denmark	Jyske Bank Boxen	15,242 / 22,000	$1,480,670
October 25, 2012	Herning	Denmark	Jyske Bank Boxen	15,242 / 22,000	$1,480,670
October 27, 2012	Copenhagen	Denmark	Parken Stadium	28,156 / 36,710	$2,609,620
October 28, 2012	Copenhagen	Denmark	Parken Stadium	28,156 / 36,710	$2,609,620
November 2, 2012	Stockholm	Sweden	Ericsson Globe	15,875 / 18,000	$1,543,730
November 3, 2012	Stockholm	Sweden	Ericsson Globe	15,875 / 18,000	$1,543,730
November 5, 2012	Helsinki	Finland	Hartwall Areena	24,493 / 34,659	$2,097,870
November 6, 2012	Helsinki	Finland	Hartwall Areena	24,493 / 34,659	$2,097,870
November 9, 2012	Saint Petersburg	Russia	Ice Palace	29,800 / 31,148	$3,410,855
November 10, 2012	Saint Petersburg	Russia	Ice Palace	29,800 / 31,148	$3,410,855
November 11, 2012	Saint Petersburg	Russia	Ice Palace	29,800 / 31,148	$3,410,855
November 16, 2012	Frankfurt	Germany	Festhalle Frankfurt	17,992 / 22,000	$1,886,090
November 17, 2012	Frankfurt	Germany	Festhalle Frankfurt	17,992 / 22,000	$1,886,090
November 20, 2012	Oberhausen	Germany	König Pilsener Arena	9,175 / 11,594	$894,598
November 21, 2012	Oberhausen	Germany	König Pilsener Arena	9,175 / 11,594	$894,598
November 24, 2012	Munich	Germany	Olympiahalle	23,299 / 24,000	$2,291,070
November 25, 2012	Munich	Germany	Olympiahalle	23,299 / 24,000	$2,291,070
November 28, 2012	Hanover	Germany	TUI Arena	7,356 / 8,000	$736,332
December 1, 2012	Vienna	Austria	Wiener Stadthalle	22,966 / 30,220	$2,345,310
December 2, 2012	Vienna	Austria	Wiener Stadthalle	22,966 / 30,220	$2,345,310
December 5, 2012	Mannheim	Germany	SAP Arena	7,729 / 7,960	$750,198
December 8, 2012	Leipzig	Germany	Leipzig Arena	10,970 / 12,000	$1,108,310
December 9, 2012	Leipzig	Germany	Leipzig Arena	10,970 / 12,000	$1,108,310
December 11, 2012	Hamburg	Germany	O_{2} World Hamburg	13,905 / 20,568	$1,231,750
December 12, 2012	Hamburg	Germany	O_{2} World Hamburg	13,905 / 20,568	$1,231,750
December 15, 2012	Cologne	Germany	Lanxess Arena	21,426 / 30,000	$2,192,280
December 16, 2012	Cologne	Germany	Lanxess Arena	21,426 / 30,000	$2,192,280
December 19, 2012	Berlin	Germany	O_{2} World Berlin	17,650 / 23,640	$1,760,320
December 20, 2012	Berlin	Germany	O_{2} World Berlin	17,650 / 23,640	$1,760,320
December 26, 2012	Madrid	Spain	Palacio de Deportes	46,540 / 51,145	$3,803,510
December 27, 2012	Madrid	Spain	Palacio de Deportes	46,540 / 51,145	$3,803,510
December 28, 2012	Madrid	Spain	Palacio de Deportes	46,540 / 51,145	$3,803,510
December 29, 2012	Madrid	Spain	Palacio de Deportes	46,540 / 51,145	$3,803,510
December 30, 2012	Madrid	Spain	Palacio de Deportes	46,540 / 51,145	$3,803,510
January 17, 2013	Kazan	Russia	TatNeft Arena	17,732 / 20,452	$2,136,633
January 18, 2013	Kazan	Russia	TatNeft Arena	17,732 / 20,452	$2,136,633
January 19, 2013	Kazan	Russia	TatNeft Arena	17,732 / 20,452	$2,136,633
January 22, 2013	Moscow	Russia	Olympisky Arena	76,818 / 86,502	$9,955,539
January 23, 2013	Moscow	Russia	Olympisky Arena	76,818 / 86,502	$9,955,539
January 24, 2013	Moscow	Russia	Olympisky Arena	76,818 / 86,502	$9,955,539
January 25, 2013	Moscow	Russia	Olympisky Arena	76,818 / 86,502	$9,955,539
January 26, 2013	Moscow	Russia	Olympisky Arena	76,818 / 86,502	$9,955,539
January 27, 2013	Moscow	Russia	Olympisky Arena	76,818 / 86,502	$9,955,539
February 5, 2013	Budapest	Hungary	Budapest Sports Arena	14,749 / 19,242	$1,231,780
February 6, 2013	Budapest	Hungary	Budapest Sports Arena	14,749 / 19,242	$1,231,780
February 8, 2013	Prague	Czech Republic	O_{2} Arena	10,762 / 22,928	$1,089,630
February 9, 2013	Prague	Czech Republic	O_{2} Arena	10,762 / 22,928	$1,089,630
February 13, 2013	Zürich	Switzerland	Hallenstadion	20,738 / 22,500	$2,884,220
February 14, 2013	Zürich	Switzerland	Hallenstadion	20,738 / 22,500	$2,884,220
February 15, 2013	Zürich	Switzerland	Hallenstadion	20,738 / 22,500	$2,884,220
February 19, 2013	Turin	Italy	Torino Palasport Olimpico	15,714 / 15,714	$943,035
February 20, 2013	Turin	Italy	Torino Palasport Olimpico	15,714 / 15,714	$943,035
February 23, 2013	Milan	Italy	Mediolanum Forum	26,566 / 26,566	$2,148,610
February 24, 2013	Milan	Italy	Mediolanum Forum	26,566 / 26,566	$2,148,610
February 26, 2013	Montpellier	France	Park&Suites Arena	8,900 / 14,562	$802,299
February 27, 2013	Montpellier	France	Park&Suites Arena	8,900 / 14,562	$802,299
March 1, 2013	Antwerp	Belgium	Sportpaleis	34,471 / 40,116	$3,070,750
March 2, 2013	Antwerp	Belgium	Sportpaleis	34,471 / 40,116	$3,070,750
March 8, 2013	Amsterdam	Netherlands	Ziggo Dome	26,744 / 30,588	$2,691,260
March 9, 2013	Amsterdam	Netherlands	Ziggo Dome	26,744 / 30,588	$2,691,260
March 10, 2013	Amsterdam	Netherlands	Ziggo Dome	26,744 / 30,588	$2,691,260
March 15, 2013	Istanbul	Turkey	Ulker Sports Arena	12,825 / 38,265	$1,004,380
March 16, 2013	Istanbul	Turkey	Ulker Sports Arena	12,825 / 38,265	$1,004,380
March 17, 2013	Istanbul	Turkey	Ulker Sports Arena	12,825 / 38,265	$1,004,380
March 26, 2013	Birmingham	England	National Indoor Arena	7,923 / 9,347	$693,247
March 29, 2013	Manchester	England	Manchester Arena	11,132 / 15,028	$892,891
March 30, 2013	Manchester	England	Manchester Arena	11,132 / 15,028	$892,891
April 2, 2013	Paris	France	Palais Omnisports de Paris-Bercy	58,458 / 83,024	$5,950,080
April 3, 2013	Paris	France	Palais Omnisports de Paris-Bercy	58,458 / 83,024	$5,950,080
April 4, 2013	Paris	France	Palais Omnisports de Paris-Bercy	58,458 / 83,024	$5,950,080
April 5, 2013	Paris	France	Palais Omnisports de Paris-Bercy	58,458 / 83,024	$5,950,080
April 6, 2013	Paris	France	Palais Omnisports de Paris-Bercy	58,458 / 83,024	$5,950,080
April 7, 2013	Paris	France	Palais Omnisports de Paris-Bercy	58,458 / 83,024	$5,950,080
April 11, 2013	Lisbon	Portugal	Pavilhão Atlântico	44,709 / 66,240	$3,612,340
April 12, 2013	Lisbon	Portugal	Pavilhão Atlântico	44,709 / 66,240	$3,612,340
April 13, 2013	Lisbon	Portugal	Pavilhão Atlântico	44,709 / 66,240	$3,612,340
April 14, 2013	Lisbon	Portugal	Pavilhão Atlântico	44,709 / 66,240	$3,612,340
April 17, 2013	Barcelona	Spain	Palau Sant Jordi	56,081 / 67,626	$4,517,110
April 18, 2013	Barcelona	Spain	Palau Sant Jordi	56,081 / 67,626	$4,517,110
April 19, 2013	Barcelona	Spain	Palau Sant Jordi	56,081 / 67,626	$4,517,110
April 20, 2013	Barcelona	Spain	Palau Sant Jordi	56,081 / 67,626	$4,517,110
April 21, 2013	Barcelona	Spain	Palau Sant Jordi	56,081 / 67,626	$4,517,110
Asia
May 9, 2013	Saitama	Japan	Saitama Super Arena	82,816 / 87,828	$8,951,360
May 10, 2013	Saitama	Japan	Saitama Super Arena	82,816 / 87,828	$8,951,360
May 11, 2013	Saitama	Japan	Saitama Super Arena	82,816 / 87,828	$8,951,360
May 12, 2013	Saitama	Japan	Saitama Super Arena	82,816 / 87,828	$8,951,360
May 16, 2013	Yokohama	Japan	Yokohama Arena	61,160 / 62,484	$7,068,320
May 17, 2013	Yokohama	Japan	Yokohama Arena	61,160 / 62,484	$7,068,320
May 18, 2013	Yokohama	Japan	Yokohama Arena	61,160 / 62,484	$7,068,320
May 19, 2013	Yokohama	Japan	Yokohama Arena	61,160 / 62,484	$7,068,320
May 23, 2013	Nagoya	Japan	Nippon Gaishi Hall	35,333 / 36,756	$4,105,970
May 24, 2013	Nagoya	Japan	Nippon Gaishi Hall	35,333 / 36,756	$4,105,970
May 25, 2013	Nagoya	Japan	Nippon Gaishi Hall	35,333 / 36,756	$4,105,970
May 26, 2013	Nagoya	Japan	Nippon Gaishi Hall	35,333 / 36,756	$4,105,970
May 30, 2013	Fukuoka	Japan	Marine Messe Fukuoka	37,068 / 45,930	$5,626,780
May 31, 2013	Fukuoka	Japan	Marine Messe Fukuoka	37,068 / 45,930	$5,626,780
June 1, 2013	Fukuoka	Japan	Marine Messe Fukuoka	37,068 / 45,930	$5,626,780
June 2, 2013	Fukuoka	Japan	Marine Messe Fukuoka	37,068 / 45,930	$5,626,780
June 6, 2013	Osaka	Japan	Osaka-Jo Hall	84,307 / 93,120	$13,899,200
June 7, 2013	Osaka	Japan	Osaka-Jo Hall	84,307 / 93,120	$13,899,200
June 8, 2013	Osaka	Japan	Osaka-Jo Hall	84,307 / 93,120	$13,899,200
June 9, 2013	Osaka	Japan	Osaka-Jo Hall	84,307 / 93,120	$13,899,200
June 13, 2013	Osaka	Japan	Osaka-Jo Hall	84,307 / 93,120	$13,899,200
June 14, 2013	Osaka	Japan	Osaka-Jo Hall	84,307 / 93,120	$13,899,200
June 15, 2013	Osaka	Japan	Osaka-Jo Hall	84,307 / 93,120	$13,899,200
June 16, 2013	Osaka	Japan	Osaka-Jo Hall	84,307 / 93,120	$13,899,200
June 28, 2013	Taipei	Taiwan	Taipei Arena	38,359 / 50,545	$4,310,940
June 29, 2013	Taipei	Taiwan	Taipei Arena	38,359 / 50,545	$4,310,940
June 30, 2013	Taipei	Taiwan	Taipei Arena	38,359 / 50,545	$4,310,940
July 10, 2013	Seoul	South Korea	Olympic Gymnastics Arena	32,367 / 66,080	$3,234,710
July 11, 2013	Seoul	South Korea	Olympic Gymnastics Arena	32,367 / 66,080	$3,234,710
July 12, 2013	Seoul	South Korea	Olympic Gymnastics Arena	32,367 / 66,080	$3,234,710
July 13, 2013	Seoul	South Korea	Olympic Gymnastics Arena	32,367 / 66,080	$3,234,710
July 14, 2013	Seoul	South Korea	Olympic Gymnastics Arena	32,367 / 66,080	$3,234,710
July 17, 2013	Daegu	South Korea	EXCO Daegu Exhibition and Convention Center	18,371 / 40,971	$1,419,340
July 18, 2013	Daegu	South Korea	EXCO Daegu Exhibition and Convention Center	18,371 / 40,971	$1,419,340
July 19, 2013	Daegu	South Korea	EXCO Daegu Exhibition and Convention Center	18,371 / 40,971	$1,419,340
July 20, 2013	Daegu	South Korea	EXCO Daegu Exhibition and Convention Center	18,371 / 40,971	$1,419,340
July 21, 2013	Daegu	South Korea	EXCO Daegu Exhibition and Convention Center	18,371 / 40,971	$1,419,340
August 9, 2013	Beijing	China	MasterCard Center	11,959 / 42,420	$1,094,970
August 10, 2013	Beijing	China	MasterCard Center	11,959 / 42,420	$1,094,970
August 11, 2013	Beijing	China	MasterCard Center	11,959 / 42,420	$1,094,970
August 16, 2013	Shanghai	China	Mercedes-Benz Arena	18,124 / 43,760	$1,687,780
August 17, 2013	Shanghai	China	Mercedes-Benz Arena	18,124 / 43,760	$1,687,780
August 18, 2013	Shanghai	China	Mercedes-Benz Arena	18,124 / 43,760	$1,687,780
August 23, 2013	Hong Kong		AsiaWorld–Arena	17,938 / 41,010	$1,713,200
August 24, 2013	Hong Kong		AsiaWorld–Arena	17,938 / 41,010	$1,713,200
August 25, 2013	Hong Kong		AsiaWorld–Arena	17,938 / 41,010	$1,713,200
Oceania
September 18, 2013	Perth	Australia	Perth Arena	52,681 / 72,516	$6,865,840
September 19, 2013	Perth	Australia	Perth Arena	52,681 / 72,516	$6,865,840
September 20, 2013	Perth	Australia	Perth Arena	52,681 / 72,516	$6,865,840
September 21, 2013	Perth	Australia	Perth Arena	52,681 / 72,516	$6,865,840
September 22, 2013	Perth	Australia	Perth Arena	52,681 / 72,516	$6,865,840
September 26, 2013	Sydney	Australia	Allphones Arena	50,593 / 58,848	$6,565,130
September 27, 2013	Sydney	Australia	Allphones Arena	50,593 / 58,848	$6,565,130
September 28, 2013	Sydney	Australia	Allphones Arena	50,593 / 58,848	$6,565,130
September 29, 2013	Sydney	Australia	Allphones Arena	50,593 / 58,848	$6,565,130
October 2, 2013	Brisbane	Australia	Brisbane Entertainment Centre	36,075 / 51,156	$4,686,980
October 3, 2013	Brisbane	Australia	Brisbane Entertainment Centre	36,075 / 51,156	$4,686,980
October 4, 2013	Brisbane	Australia	Brisbane Entertainment Centre	36,075 / 51,156	$4,686,980
October 5, 2013	Brisbane	Australia	Brisbane Entertainment Centre	36,075 / 51,156	$4,686,980
October 6, 2013	Brisbane	Australia	Brisbane Entertainment Centre	36,075 / 51,156	$4,686,980
October 9, 2013	Melbourne	Australia	Rod Laver Arena	59,810 / 64,414	$7,761,670
October 10, 2013	Melbourne	Australia	Rod Laver Arena	59,810 / 64,414	$7,761,670
October 11, 2013	Melbourne	Australia	Rod Laver Arena	59,810 / 64,414	$7,761,670
October 12, 2013	Melbourne	Australia	Rod Laver Arena	59,810 / 64,414	$7,761,670
October 13, 2013	Melbourne	Australia	Rod Laver Arena	59,810 / 64,414	$7,761,670
October 15, 2013	Adelaide	Australia	Adelaide Entertainment Centre	21,323 / 24,284	$2,837,820
October 16, 2013	Adelaide	Australia	Adelaide Entertainment Centre	21,323 / 24,284	$2,837,820
October 17, 2013	Adelaide	Australia	Adelaide Entertainment Centre	21,323 / 24,284	$2,837,820
October 30, 2013	Auckland	New Zealand	Vector Arena	58,507 / 67,168	$6,911,550
October 31, 2013	Auckland	New Zealand	Vector Arena	58,507 / 67,168	$6,911,550
November 1, 2013	Auckland	New Zealand	Vector Arena	58,507 / 67,168	$6,911,550
November 2, 2013	Auckland	New Zealand	Vector Arena	58,507 / 67,168	$6,911,550
November 3, 2013	Auckland	New Zealand	Vector Arena	58,507 / 67,168	$6,911,550
Asia
December 30, 2013	Dubai	United Arab Emirates	Dubai World Trade Centre	50,540 / 60,000	$7,100,620
January 1, 2014	Dubai	United Arab Emirates	Dubai World Trade Centre	50,540 / 60,000	$7,100,620
January 2, 2014	Dubai	United Arab Emirates	Dubai World Trade Centre	50,540 / 60,000	$7,100,620
January 3, 2014	Dubai	United Arab Emirates	Dubai World Trade Centre	50,540 / 60,000	$7,100,620
January 4, 2014	Dubai	United Arab Emirates	Dubai World Trade Centre	50,540 / 60,000	$7,100,620
January 6, 2014	Dubai	United Arab Emirates	Dubai World Trade Centre	50,540 / 60,000	$7,100,620
January 7, 2014	Dubai	United Arab Emirates	Dubai World Trade Centre	50,540 / 60,000	$7,100,620
January 8, 2014	Dubai	United Arab Emirates	Dubai World Trade Centre	50,540 / 60,000	$7,100,620
January 9, 2014	Dubai	United Arab Emirates	Dubai World Trade Centre	50,540 / 60,000	$7,100,620
January 10, 2014	Dubai	United Arab Emirates	Dubai World Trade Centre	50,540 / 60,000	$7,100,620
January 11, 2014	Dubai	United Arab Emirates	Dubai World Trade Centre	50,540 / 60,000	$7,100,620
January 13, 2014	Dubai	United Arab Emirates	Dubai World Trade Centre	50,540 / 60,000	$7,100,620
January 14, 2014	Dubai	United Arab Emirates	Dubai World Trade Centre	50,540 / 60,000	$7,100,620
North America
February 28, 2014	Worcester	United States	DCU Center	7,862 / 9,460	$784,647
March 1, 2014	Worcester	United States	DCU Center	7,862 / 9,460	$784,647
March 6, 2014	Amherst	United States	Mullins Center	3,747 / 5,129	$286,567
March 10, 2014	Rochester	United States	Blue Cross Arena	7,104 / 10,000	$627,084
March 11, 2014	Rochester	United States	Blue Cross Arena	7,104 / 10,000	$627,084
March 18, 2014	Baltimore	United States	1st Mariner Arena	9,354 / 11,886	$965,083
March 19, 2014	Baltimore	United States	1st Mariner Arena	9,354 / 11,886	$965,083
March 21, 2014	Fairfax	United States	Patriot Center	11,905 / 12,654	$1,408,665
March 22, 2014	Fairfax	United States	Patriot Center	11,905 / 12,654	$1,408,665
March 25, 2014	Philadelphia	United States	Wells Fargo Center	12,375 / 15,902	$1,210,963
March 26, 2014	Philadelphia	United States	Wells Fargo Center	12,375 / 15,902	$1,210,963
March 28, 2014	Trenton	United States	Sun National Bank Center	8,664 / 10,602	$722,531
March 29, 2014	Trenton	United States	Sun National Bank Center	8,664 / 10,602	$722,531
April 1, 2014	Raleigh	United States	PNC Arena	4,802 / 17,336	$399,837
April 2, 2014	Raleigh	United States	PNC Arena	4,802 / 17,336	$399,837
April 4, 2014	Norfolk	United States	Norfolk Scope Arena	7,296 / 17,692	$761,662
April 5, 2014	Norfolk	United States	Norfolk Scope Arena	7,296 / 17,692	$761,662
April 8, 2014	Charlotte	United States	Time Warner Cable Arena	5,748 / 15,584	$489,436
April 9, 2014	Charlotte	United States	Time Warner Cable Arena	5,748 / 15,584	$489,436
April 11, 2014	Greensboro	United States	Greensboro Coliseum	6,215 / 12,480	$513,676
April 12, 2014	Greensboro	United States	Greensboro Coliseum	6,215 / 12,480	$513,676
April 15, 2014	Richmond	United States	Richmond Coliseum	6,408 / 11,772	$622,712
April 16, 2014	Richmond	United States	Richmond Coliseum	6,408 / 11,772	$622,712
April 18, 2014	Columbus	United States	Value City Arena	8,654 / 15,062	$751,992
April 19, 2014	Columbus	United States	Value City Arena	8,654 / 15,062	$751,992
April 22, 2014	North Little Rock	United States	Verizon Arena	4,886 / 18,238	$359,227
April 23, 2014	North Little Rock	United States	Verizon Arena	4,886 / 18,238	$359,227
April 25, 2014	Louisville	United States	KFC Yum! Center	8,233 / 13,660	$681,119
April 26, 2014	Louisville	United States	KFC Yum! Center	8,233 / 13,660	$681,119
April 29, 2014	Toledo	United States	Huntington Center	6,125 / 8,390	$418,637
April 30, 2014	Toledo	United States	Huntington Center	6,125 / 8,390	$418,637
May 2, 2014	Lexington	United States	Rupp Arena	4,177 / 15,538	$410,142
May 3, 2014	Lexington	United States	Rupp Arena	4,177 / 15,538	$410,142
May 6, 2014	Huntsville	United States	Propst Arena	3,420 / 10,166	$310,083
May 7, 2014	Huntsville	United States	Propst Arena	3,420 / 10,166	$310,083
May 10, 2014	Duluth	United States	Arena at Gwinnett Center	11,790 / 15,324	$1,136,958
May 11, 2014	Duluth	United States	Arena at Gwinnett Center	11,790 / 15,324	$1,136,958
May 13, 2014	Gainesville	United States	O'Connell Center	4,936 / 11,660	$393,001
May 14, 2014	Gainesville	United States	O'Connell Center	4,936 / 11,660	$393,001
May 16, 2014	North Charleston	United States	North Charleston Coliseum	6,306 / 13,178	$525,785
May 17, 2014	North Charleston	United States	North Charleston Coliseum	6,306 / 13,178	$525,785
May 20, 2014	Tampa	United States	Tampa Bay Times Forum	12,737 / 14,150	$1,113,082
May 21, 2014	Tampa	United States	Tampa Bay Times Forum	12,737 / 14,150	$1,113,082
May 23, 2014	Sunrise	United States	BB&T Center	17,733 / 20,700	$1,541,926
May 24, 2014	Sunrise	United States	BB&T Center	17,733 / 20,700	$1,541,926
June 24, 2014	Lincoln	United States	Pinnacle Bank Arena	7,777 / 10,580	$592,330
June 25, 2014	Lincoln	United States	Pinnacle Bank Arena	7,777 / 10,580	$592,330
June 27, 2014	Hoffman Estates	United States	Sears Centre Arena	11,003 / 11,688	$948,253
June 28, 2014	Hoffman Estates	United States	Sears Centre Arena	11,003 / 11,688	$948,253
July 8, 2014	Salt Lake City	United States	EnergySolutions Arena	—N/a	—N/a
July 9, 2014	Salt Lake City	United States	EnergySolutions Arena	—N/a	—N/a
July 22, 2014	Oklahoma City	United States	Chesapeake Energy Arena	5,250 / 9,806	$393,489
July 23, 2014	Oklahoma City	United States	Chesapeake Energy Arena	5,250 / 9,806	$393,489
July 25, 2014	Dallas	United States	American Airlines Center	8,976 / 12,738	$845,608
July 26, 2014	Dallas	United States	American Airlines Center	8,976 / 12,738	$845,608
July 29, 2014	Lafayette	United States	Cajundome	6,052 / 12,590	$548,460
July 30, 2014	Lafayette	United States	Cajundome	6,052 / 12,590	$548,460
August 5, 2014	Cedar Park	United States	Cedar Park Center	4,862 / 10,854	$396,317
August 6, 2014	Cedar Park	United States	Cedar Park Center	4,862 / 10,854	$396,317
August 8, 2014	Houston	United States	Toyota Center	14,480 / 15,596	$1,240,387
August 9, 2014	Houston	United States	Toyota Center	14,480 / 15,596	$1,240,387
Latin America
August 20, 2014	Mexico City	Mexico	Palacio de los Deportes	52,441 / 109,560	$3,723,640
August 21, 2014	Mexico City	Mexico	Palacio de los Deportes	52,441 / 109,560	$3,723,640
August 22, 2014	Mexico City	Mexico	Palacio de los Deportes	52,441 / 109,560	$3,723,640
August 23, 2014	Mexico City	Mexico	Palacio de los Deportes	52,441 / 109,560	$3,723,640
August 24, 2014	Mexico City	Mexico	Palacio de los Deportes	52,441 / 109,560	$3,723,640
August 28, 2014	Guadalajara	Mexico	Arena VFG	42,025 / 64,176	$3,017,370
August 29, 2014	Guadalajara	Mexico	Arena VFG	42,025 / 64,176	$3,017,370
August 30, 2014	Guadalajara	Mexico	Arena VFG	42,025 / 64,176	$3,017,370
August 31, 2014	Guadalajara	Mexico	Arena VFG	42,025 / 64,176	$3,017,370
Total				3,207,796 / 4,401,410	$341,958,550

== Cancelled shows ==
List of cancelled concerts, showing date, city, country, venue and reason for cancellation
Date	City	Country	Venue	Reason
November 16, 2011	Eugene	United States	Matthew Knight Arena	Logistical issues
November 20, 2011	Portland	United States	Rose Garden Arena	Logistical issues
March 19, 2014	Johannesburg	South Africa	Coca-Cola Dome	Scheduling issues
March 20, 2014	Johannesburg	South Africa	Coca-Cola Dome	Scheduling issues
March 21, 2014	Johannesburg	South Africa	Coca-Cola Dome	Scheduling issues
March 22, 2014	Johannesburg	South Africa	Coca-Cola Dome	Scheduling issues
July 1, 2014	Auburn Hills	United States	Palace Of Auburn Hills	Scheduling issues
July 2, 2014	Auburn Hills	United States	Palace Of Auburn Hills	Scheduling issues
July 7, 2014	Salt Lake City	United States	EnergySolutions Arena	Scheduling issues
July 8, 2014	Salt Lake City	United States	EnergySolutions Arena	Scheduling issues
July 11, 2014	Rio Rancho	United States	Santa Ana Star Center	Scheduling issues
July 12, 2014	Rio Rancho	United States	Santa Ana Star Center	Scheduling issues
July 18, 2014	Topeka	United States	Kansas Expocentre	Scheduling issues
July 19, 2014	Topeka	United States	Kansas Expocentre	Scheduling issues
August 1, 2014	Laredo	United States	Laredo Energy Arena	Scheduling issues
August 2, 2014	Laredo	United States	Laredo Energy Arena	Scheduling issues

== Personnel ==
=== Main ===
- Writer and director — Jamie King
- Creation director — Chantal Tremblay
- Associate Show Director - Carla Kama
- Musical designer — Kevin Antunes
- Music — Michael Jackson
- Remixer — Kevin Antunes
- Set designer — Mark Fisher
- Props and scenic designer — Michael Curry
- Costume designer — Zaldy Goco
- Acrobatic performance designer — Germain Guillemot
- Rigging and acrobatic equipment designer — Scott Osgood
- Projection designer — Olivier Goulet
- Lighting designer — Martin Labrecque
- Sound designer — François Desjardins

=== Band ===
- Musical director — Greg Phillinganes
- Keyboards — Greg Phillinganes, Darrell Smith, Charles Wilson
- Drums — Jonathan "Sugarfoot" Moffett
- Guitars — Jon Clark and Desiree Bassett
- Bass — Don Boyette
- Percussion — Taku Hirano and Bashiri Johnson
- Horns — Keyon Harrold, Mike Phillips, Michael Ghegan, Ravi Best
- Cello — Tina Guo and Mariko
- Vocals — Fred White, Jason Woods, Stephanie Alexander, Jaymee Marie Rodriguez Rivera, and Jory Steinberg

=== Performers ===
- Main dancers —Loukas LEECO Kosmidis, Pom Arnold, Jonathan Bayani, Michael Cameron, Tina Cannon, Khalid Freeman, Jawkeen Howard, Ruthy Inchaustegui, Jeff "JBoogie" Kelly, Shondra Leigh, Cameron Mckinlay, Fernando Miro, Leo Moctezuma, Gianinni Semedo Moreira, Melena Rounis, Tammy To, Levan Torchinava, Irakli Gelozia, Davi Lorenzo, Yavuz Topuz, Tomohiko Tsujimoto, Joseph Wiggan & Josette Wiggan, Kendrick Jones & Danielle Hobbs, Jean Sok, and Les Twins
- Mimes — Mansour Abdessadok and Jonathan Bayani
- Pole dancers — Anna Melnikova, Felix Cane, Talia Marino, Giulia Piolanti
- Aerial silks artist — Giulia Piolanti
- Straps Artist – Igor Zaripov
- Contortionist — Baaska Enkhbaatar
- Fanatics — Tomohiko Tsujimoto, Leo Moctezuma, Levan Torchinava, Khalid Freeman, Kendrick Jones, Cameron McKinlay
- Acrobats — Thomas Hubener, Vincent Deplanche, Christian Détraz, Stéphane Détraz, Harvey Donnelly, Darren Trull, Kodai Noro, Daisuke Suzuki, Yuta Takahashi, Mitsuhiro Tamura, Tatsuya Tanimoto, Narihito Tonosaki, Loic Weissbrodt, Terrance Harrison, Joshua Rasile, Igor Zaripov
