= You Were There (disambiguation) =

"You Were There" is a 1992 song by Southern Sons.

You Were There may also refer to:

- "You Were There" (1989), an unreleased song by Michael Jackson and Buz Kohan
- "You Were There", by Babyface from the 1998 album Christmas with Babyface
- "You Were There", by Avalon, from the 2004 album The Creed
- You Were There, a novel by Thelma Strabel

== See also ==
- "Five Candles (You Were There)", a song by Jars of Clay from the 1997 album Much Afraid
- "ICO -You Were There-", from the soundtrack of the 2001 PlayStation 2 video game ICO
