= How Come, How Long =

Single by Babyface featuring Stevie Wonder

from the album The Day
- Released: July 7, 1997
- Genre: Soul
- Length: 5:10 (album version); 4:11 (radio edit)
- Label: Epic
- Songwriters: Babyface, Stevie Wonder
- Producer: Babyface

Babyface singles chronology
| "Every Time I Close My Eyes" (1997) | "How Come, How Long" (1997) | "(Always Be My) Sunshine" (1997) |

Audio sample
- How Come, How Long: file; help

Music video
- "How Come, How Long" on YouTube

"How Come, How Long" is a song written, produced and performed by Babyface (Kenneth Edmonds). It was released as the third and final single from his fourth album, The Day (1996). It is a duet with American singer-songwriter Stevie Wonder.

The lyrics deal with domestic violence, regarding a woman who was killed by her husband after tremendous physical abuse. This release met with mixed reaction by critics and did not chart on any major charts in the United States, finding a better chart performance in the United Kingdom, where it became a top ten hit for the performers. At the 40th Grammy Awards this song received a nomination for Best Pop Collaboration with Vocals, which it lost to "Don't Look Back" by John Lee Hooker and Van Morrison. The following year, the song received the same nomination with the live version included on Babyface's Unplugged album, losing this time to Elvis Costello and Burt Bacharach with their rendition of "I Still Have That Other Girl".

== Background ==
The track was written, produced and performed by Babyface as a duet with American singer-songwriter Stevie Wonder, who also co-wrote the song. The lyrics deal with domestic violence and is inspired by the Nicole Brown Simpson case.

== Critical reception ==
On the Entertainment Weekly review of The Day, David Browne wrote that this "domestic-abuse saga" needed "tougher music to make its point". A reviewer from Music Week rated the song four out of five, stating that "Wonder's input (singing and harmonica-playing) is obvious on this emotionally-charged soul ballad". The magazine's Alan Jones viewed it as "a worthy social commentary piece (about wife beating)".

== Music video ==
The accompanying music video for this song, directed by F. Gary Gray, shows several residents of an apartment building ignoring the shouts, screams, and arguments between a married couple, ending with a twist, showing that the woman killed her abusive husband, ending with her being arrested. This video received a nomination for Best R&B Video at the 1997 MTV Video Music Awards, which was awarded to "I'll Be Missing You" by Puff Daddy (Sean Combs) featuring Faith Evans and 112. It also was nominated for a Grammy Award for Best Short Form Music Video, losing to "Got 'til It's Gone" by Janet Jackson.

== Track listing ==
- US CD single
1. "How Come, How Long" – 5:11
2. "Every Time I Close My Eyes" (Timbaland remix) – 4:23
- UK CD single (XPCD2161)
1. "How Come, How Long" (Radio edit) – 4:12
- CD maxi single (EPC 664402 2)
1. "How Come, How Long" (radio edit) – 4:12
2. "How Come, How Long" (Natty & Slaps remix) – 5:08
3. "How Come, How Long" (Laws & Craigie remix) – 6:28
4. "Every Time I Close My Eyes" (Timbaland remix) – 4:55

== Chart ==
=== Weekly charts ===
| Chart (1997) | Peak position |
|---|---|
| Australia (ARIA) | 5 |
| Austria (Ö3 Austria Top 40) | 9 |
| Belgium (Ultratop 50 Flanders) | 15 |
| Belgium (Ultratop 50 Wallonia) | 16 |
| Denmark (IFPI) | 17 |
| France (SNEP) | 22 |
| Germany (GfK) | 17 |
| Ireland (IRMA) | 10 |
| Netherlands (Dutch Top 40) | 2 |
| Netherlands (Single Top 100) | 2 |
| New Zealand (Recorded Music NZ) | 9 |
| Norway (VG-lista) | 5 |
| Sweden (Sverigetopplistan) | 9 |
| Switzerland (Schweizer Hitparade) | 10 |
| UK Singles (OCC) | 10 |
| US Rhythmic Top 40 (Billboard) | 21 |
| US Top 40 Mainstream (Billboard) | 31 |

=== Year-end charts ===
| Chart (1997) | Position |
|---|---|
| Australia (ARIA) | 27 |
| Belgium (Ultratop 50 Flanders) | 67 |
| Belgium (Ultratop 50 Wallonia) | 89 |
| Germany (Media Control) | 78 |
| Netherlands (Dutch Top 40) | 27 |
| Netherlands (Single Top 100) | 26 |
| Romania (Romanian Top 100) | 14 |
| Sweden (Topplistan) | 47 |
| Switzerland (Schweizer Hitparade) | 30 |

== Certifications ==
| Region | Certification | Certified units/sales |
|---|---|---|
| Australia (ARIA) | Platinum | 70,000^{^} |
^{^} Shipments figures based on certification alone.

== Personnel ==
The following people contributed to "How Come, How Long":

- Babyface — main performer and producer
- Stevie Wonder — vocals, harmonica
- Timbaland — producer, remixing
- Jimmy Douglas — remixing
- Jon Gass — mixing
- Benny Medina — management
- Anton Corbijn — photography
