= There She Goes (Babyface song) =

Single by Babyface

from the album Face2Face
- B-side: "Don't Take It Personal", "Lover and Friend", "Stress Out", "What If", "Work It Out"
- Released: June 19, 2001
- Genre: Electro-R&B; R&B; hip-hop soul
- Length: 4:31
- Label: Arista
- Songwriters: Kenneth Edmonds; Pharrell Williams; Charles Hugo
- Producer: The Neptunes

Babyface singles chronology
"Reason for Breathing" (2000)	"There She Goes" (2001)	"What If" (2001)

Music video
- "There She Goes" on YouTube

"There She Goes" is a song by American R&B singer Babyface, issued as the lead single from his sixth studio album Face2Face. Produced and co-written by The Neptunes, it was the first single Babyface released that he did not produce himself. The song peaked at number 31 on the Billboard Hot 100 in 2001, making it his last Top 40 entry to date.

== Music video ==
The official music video for the song was directed by Hype Williams.

== Personnel ==
Credits adapted from album liner notes.

- Babyface: lead vocals, background vocals, writer, bass
- The Neptunes: producers, instruments
- Pharrell Williams: writer, background vocals
- Chad Hugo: writer
- Latrelle Simmons: background vocals
- Wayne Lindsey: electric piano
- Paul Boutin: recording engineer
- Jean-Marie Horvat: mix engineer
- Josean Posey: assistant mix engineer

== Charts ==
=== Weekly charts ===
Chart (2001)	Peak position
US Billboard Hot 100	31
US Hot R&B/Hip-Hop Songs (Billboard)	10

=== Year-end charts ===
Chart (2001)	Position
UK Urban (Music Week)	30
US Hot R&B/Hip-Hop Songs (Billboard)	75
