= Talk to Me (Babyface song) =

Single by Babyface

from the album The Day
- Released: October 26, 1996
- Recorded: 1996
- Genre: R&B; soft rock
- Label: Epic
- Songwriter: Kenneth Edmonds

Babyface singles chronology
| "This Is for the Lover in You" (1996) | "Talk to Me" (1996) | "Every Time I Close My Eyes" (1997) |

"Talk to Me" is a song written by Kenneth "Babyface" Edmonds. The track features Eric Clapton on guitar and was released in 1996 on the album The Day. A live performance featuring Clapton on was released in 1997 on the album MTV Unplugged NYC 1997.

Just before performing the song with Clapton for the MTV Unplugged session, Edmonds explained how the song came about: "This is a song that I was working on when we worked together on Change the World. He started playing guitar and I started smelling neck bone, grits and greens and things. So we did this song called 'Talk to Me'."

== Personnel and credits ==
Credits adapted from album liner notes.

- Babyface – writer, producer, lead vocals, keyboards, programming, acoustic guitar
- Eric Clapton - guitar
- Michael Thompson – guitar
- Nathan East - bass
- John Robinson – drums
- Sheila E – percussion
- De De O’Neal, Marc Nelson, Shanice Wilson – background vocals
- Brad Gilderman, Adam Kagan, Thom Russo – engineers
- Paul Boutin, Greg Collins, Tim Lauber – assistant engineers
- Tim Hoogenakker, John Hurlbut, Rafa Sardina, Peter Doell – assistant engineers
- Jon Gass – mixer
- Kyle Bess – assistant mix engineer
- Randy Walker – programmer
- Eddy Shreyer - mastering

== Charts ==
| Chart (1997–1998) | Peak position |
|---|---|
| Australia (ARIA) | 155 |
| Netherlands (Single Top 100) | 75 |
| New Zealand (Recorded Music NZ) | 50 |
