= Childhood (Michael Jackson song) =

Single by Michael Jackson

from the album HIStory: Past, Present and Future, Book I and Free Willy 2: Original Motion Picture Soundtrack
- A-side: "Scream"
- Released: May 29, 1995
- Genre: Orchestral pop
- Length: 4:27
- Label: Epic
- Songwriter: Michael Jackson
- Producers: Michael Jackson; David Foster

Michael Jackson singles chronology
"Gone Too Soon" (1993)	"Scream" / "Childhood" (1995)	"You Are Not Alone" (1995)

Music video
- "Childhood" on YouTube

"Childhood" is a 1995 song composed and recorded by American singer Michael Jackson. It was released as a track on Jackson's 1995 studio album HIStory: Past, Present and Future, Book I, and was released as a double A-side with Jackson's single "Scream".

"Childhood" is an autobiographical song written and composed by Michael Jackson. The theme of the track is his difficult childhood experiences. It would become the main theme song for Free Willy 2: The Adventure Home that centered on the character Elvis, continuing his association with the Free Willy series. The track appeared on several compilation albums, but was met with a mixed reception amongst critics. The song's music video, which had little in common with the supporting film, has been critically praised.

== Background ==
"Childhood" is a biographical reference to Jackson's difficult years as a youngster, such as the relationship with his father Joseph and the pressures of being world-famous from such a young age as the lead singer of the Jackson 5. From a young age, Jackson and his siblings were allegedly physically and emotionally abused by their father through incessant rehearsals, whippings and derogatory name-calling. Jackson's abuse as a child had affected him throughout his later life. In one altercation—later recalled by Marlon Jackson—Joseph held Michael Jackson upside down by one leg and "pummelled him over and over again with his hand, hitting him on his back and buttocks". Joseph would allegedly often trip up or push his sons into walls. One night, while Jackson was asleep, Joseph climbed into his room through the bedroom window. Wearing a fright mask, he entered the room screaming and shouting. Joseph said he wanted to teach his children not to leave the window open when they went to sleep. For a number of years afterward, Jackson suffered nightmares about being kidnapped from his bedroom.

Although it had been reported for several years that Jackson had an abusive childhood, he first spoke openly about it in a 1993 interview with Oprah Winfrey. He grimaced when speaking of the childhood abuse at the hands of his father; he stated he had missed out on much of his childhood, admitting that he often cried from loneliness. In the same interview, speaking of his father, Jackson said, "There were times when he'd come to see me, I'd get sick...I'd start to regurgitate. I'm sorry...Please don't be mad at me...But I do love him". In Jackson's other high-profile interview Living with Michael Jackson (2003), he covered his face with his hand and began crying when talking about his childhood abuse. Jackson recalled that Joseph sat in a chair as the group rehearsed, saying, "He had this belt in his hand. If you didn't do it the right way, he would tear you up, really get you. It was bad. Real bad". When Jackson received his Living Legend award—presented to him by Janet Jackson—at the 1993 Grammys, he said, "I don't read all the things written about me, I wasn't aware the world thought I was so weird and bizarre. But when you grow up like I did in front of 100 million people since the age of five, you're automatically different... My childhood was completely taken away from me. There was no Christmas, no birthdays. It was not a normal childhood, no normal pleasures of childhood. Those were exchanged for hard work, struggle and pain, and eventual material and professional success".

Both of Jackson's parents have denied the longstanding abuse allegations and Katherine acknowledges that although the whippings are viewed as child abuse by current generations, such disciplinary methods were normal back then. In an interview, Jackie, Tito, Jermaine and Marlon have also denied that their father is abusive and according to Jermaine, he is, second to Michael, one of the most misunderstood people.

For its inclusion in Free Willy 2: The Adventure Home, despite being billed as the theme from the film, "Childhood" played a pivotal role in the scene where Elvis ran away after his half-brother Jesse and their foster parents, Glen and Annie, each denied his help which in-turn caused the latter to accidentally break a promise she made between her and Elvis the previous day about letting him get involve in helping Willy and Littlespot especially Luna who falls ill from swimming through the oil spill that trapped the whales at the main Camp Nor'Wester site where the Greenwoods were camping. An instrumental version of the song is also played when Elvis is all alone later that night.

=== Album booklet ===
In the HIStory: Past, Present and Future, Book I album booklet there is a drawing of Jackson as a child. He is huddled in a corner of the room and looks scared; the electric cord of his microphone has snapped. On one corner wall are the lyrics to "Childhood", the other wall shows Jackson's signature.

== Production, music and reception ==
"Childhood"
Excerpt of the beginning of "Childhood".

Professional ratings
Review scores
Source	Rating
AllMusic	2.5/5 stars

"Childhood" is a biographical song, written, produced and sung solely by Michael Jackson. New York City's children's choir are credited for providing backing vocals on the track. The song appeared alongside an instrumental version in Free Willy 2: The Adventure Home and its soundtrack which was released by Epic Soundtrax, 550 Music and Jackson's label MJJ. Jackson had previously provided the main theme song for the first Free Willy film, his hit single "Will You Be There", originally from Dangerous. Aside from HIStory and the Free Willy 2: The Adventure Home soundtrack, "Childhood" appeared on compilations such as Movie Music: The Definitive Performances and Sony Music 100 Years: Soundtrack for a Century.

Jon Pareles described it as a "defense show...Over tinkling keyboards and strings that could be sweeping across a cinemascope panorama, he croons [the lyrics]". He described it as "creepy" yet "lushest". In the song, Jackson states, "No one understands me...They view it as such strange eccentricities, 'cause I keep kidding around". He invokes "the painful youth I've had" and asks the public to, "Try hard to love me" and, with a breaking voice, asks, "Have you seen my childhood?". James Hunter believed, "uncut Hollywood fluff like "Childhood"...has zero point of view on itself; its blend of rampaging ego and static orchestral pop is a Streisand-size mistake". Chris Willman of the Los Angeles Times described it as "dynamically enunciated reading and maudlin string arrangement directly invoke Streisand".

Tim Molloy, of the Associated Press, called it a sweet sounding pleading song. Patrick Macdonald of The Seattle Times described "Childhood" as "a sad, self-pitying song, but quite moving and beautiful". Taraborrelli observed that the song was not purely about his bad childhood years, but was also a plea for compassion and understanding.

== Live versions ==
"Childhood" was performed as an instrumental interlude to "Smooth Criminal" during the HIStory World Tour. It was also performed live during the Michael Jackson: The Immortal World Tour by Cirque du Soleil and is featured on the Immortal remix album.

== Music video ==
The video is set in a forest; Jackson, in scruffy clothes, sings "Childhood" while sitting on a tree stump. The camera moves up the trees into the night sky and flying airships travel overhead. On board the ships, children are seen playing a variety of games as they travel further away from Jackson, towards the Moon. Other children appear in the forest undergrowth before floating up towards the airships, but Jackson remains seated on the tree stump. In addition to an appearance from Jenna Malone and Erika Christensen, there is a Free Willy 2 tie-in featuring Jason James Richter and Francis Capra reprising their roles as Jesse and Elvis respectively.

The video for "Childhood" is four and a half minutes long and has little in common with the corresponding film. In the publication, Doug Pratt's DVD: Movies, Television, Music, Art, Adult, and More!, Pratt describes the video as "outstanding, a Chris Van Allsburg-style vision of children in flying airships, crusading through a forest at night".

== Track listing ==
Adapted from the 1995 cassette single.

No.	Title	Writer(s)	Length
1.	"Scream" (with Janet Jackson)	James Harris III, Terry Lewis, Michael Jackson, Janet Jackson	4:38
2.	"Childhood" (Theme from Free Willy 2)	Michael Jackson	4:28

== Personnel ==
- Produced by Michael Jackson and David Foster
- Recorded and mixed by Bruce Swedien
- Arranged by Michael Jackson, David Foster, and Bruce Swedien
- Orchestration by Jeremy Lubbock
- Michael Jackson – lead vocals and percussion
- New York City's Children's Choir – Tracy Spindler, Natalia Harris, Jonathon Ungar, Brandi Stewart, Reeve Carney, Caryn Jones, and Brian Jones
- New York Philharmonic Orchestra conducted by Jeremy Lubbock
- David Foster – percussion, keyboards, and synthesizers
- Brad Buxer – keyboards and synthesizers
- Michael Boddicker and Brad Buxer – synthesizer programming

== Cover versions ==
The song was covered by Italian singer Cristina D'Avena for her 2009 Magia Di Natale album as a tribute to Jackson.

== Bibliography ==
- Campbell, Lisa (1995). Michael Jackson: The King of Pops Darkest Hour. Branden. ISBN 0828320039.
- George, Nelson (2004). Michael Jackson: The Ultimate Collection booklet. Sony BMG.
- Pratt, Douglas (2005). Doug Pratt's DVD: Movies, Television, Music, Art, Adult, and More!. UNET 2 Corporation. ISBN 1932916016.
- Lewis, Jel (2005). Michael Jackson, the King of Pop: The Big Picture: the Music! the Man! the Legend! the Interviews!. Amber Books Publishing. ISBN 097497790X.
- Taraborrelli, J. Randy (2004). The Magic and the Madness. Terra Alta, WV: Headline. ISBN 0330420054.
