= MTV Unplugged NYC 1997 =

Live album by Babyface
- Released: 25 November 1997
- Recorded: Hammerstein Ballroom
- Genre: R&B
- Length: 63:11
- Label: Epic
- Producer: Alex Coletti

Babyface chronology
The Day (1996)	MTV Unplugged NYC 1997 (1997)	Christmas with Babyface (1998)

Professional ratings
Review scores
Source	Rating
AllMusic	3/5 stars
Entertainment Weekly	(C)
Los Angeles Times	3/4 stars
The New York Times	(Favorable)

MTV Unplugged NYC 1997 is a live album by R&B artist Babyface. It includes other performers such as Eric Clapton, Shanice, K-Ci & JoJo, Kevon Edmonds, Melvin Edmonds, Sheila E. and Stevie Wonder.

== Track listing ==
No.	Title	Writer(s)	Notes	Length
1.	"Change the World"	Tommy Sims, Gordon Kennedy, Wayne Kirkpatrick	feat. Eric Clapton	7:33
2.	"Talk to Me"	Kenneth "Babyface" Edmonds	feat. Eric Clapton	6:32
3.	"Whip Appeal"	Edmonds, Perri "Pebbles" Reid		4:38
4.	"Breathe Again"	Edmonds	feat. Shanice	2:49
5.	"Exhale (Shoop Shoop)"	Edmonds	feat. Beverly Crowder	3:57
6.	"Medley: "I'll Make Love to You"/"End of the Road"	Edmonds, Antonio "L.A." Reid, Daryl Simmons		5:56
7.	"I Care About You"	Edmonds	feat. K-Ci & JoJo, Kevon Edmonds & Melvin Edmonds	5:05
8.	"The Day (That You Gave Me a Son)"	Edmonds		7:59
9.	"Gone Too Soon"	Larry Grossman, Buz Kohan	feat. Stevie Wonder	5:08
10.	"How Come, How Long"	Edmonds, Stevie Wonder	feat. Stevie Wonder	9:30

== Charts ==
=== Weekly charts ===
Chart	Peak position
Australian Albums (ARIA)	141
Japanese Oricon Albums Chart	24
US Billboard 200	106
US Billboard Top R&B/Hip-Hop Albums	33

=== Certifications ===
Region	Certification	Certified units/sales
Canada (Music Canada)	Gold	50,000^{^}
Japan (RIAJ)	Platinum	200,000^{^}
United States (RIAA)	Gold	500,000^{^}
^{^} Shipments figures based on certification alone.
