= What If (Babyface song) =

Single by Babyface

from the album Face2Face
- B-side: "Lover and Friend"
- Released: June 19, 2001
- Genre: R&B
- Length: 4:06
- Label: Arista
- Songwriter: Kenneth Edmonds
- Producers: Kenneth Edmonds; Andre Harrell

Babyface singles chronology
"There She Goes" (2001)	"What If" (2001)	"The Loneliness" (2004)

Music video
- "What If" on YouTube

"What If" is a song written, co-produced and performed by American contemporary R&B musician Babyface, issued as the second official single from his sixth studio album Face2Face (following the promotional single "Baby's Mama"). The song peaked at #80 on the Billboard Hot 100 in 2001.

== Music video ==
The official music video for "What If" was directed by Bille Woodruff. Actress Sanaa Lathan, portray Babyface love interest in the music video. The video features scenes involving Babyface and Lathan that correspond to the song's narrative.

== Personnel and credits ==
Credits adapted from album liner notes.

- Babyface: lead vocals, background vocals, writer, producer, drum & keyboard programming, bass
- Wayne Lindsey: electric piano
- Paul Boutin: recording engineer
- Jean-Marie Horvat: mix engineer
- Josean Posey: assistant mix engineer

== Chart positions ==
Chart (2001)	Peak position
US Billboard Hot 100	80
US Hot R&B/Hip-Hop Singles & Tracks (Billboard)	28
