= Jean Sok =

French professional breakdancer

Jean Sok also known as BBoy Hourth, is a French-born one-legged professional breakdancer.

Sok is known for performing in Cirque du Soleil's Michael Jackson tribute The Immortal World Tour and performance at the 2012 Billboard Music Awards as a backup dancer for Goodie Mob. He uses “b-boy” style techniques and incorporates his crutches into his moves,. He uses his crutches as an extension of his arms.

Sok started dancing at age 15.
