= Every Time I Close My Eyes =

Single by Babyface featuring Kenny G and Mariah Carey

from the album The Day and The Moment
- B-side: "Lady, Lady"
- Released: January 1997
- Recorded: 1996
- Studio: Larrabee Sound Studios (Los Angeles, CA)
- Genre: R&B; soul; smooth jazz
- Length: 4:58 (album version); 4:11 (radio edit)
- Label: Epic; Sony
- Songwriter: Kenneth Edmonds
- Producer: Edmonds

Babyface singles chronology
| "Talk to Me" (1996) | "Every Time I Close My Eyes" (1997) | "How Come, How Long" (1997) |

Music video
- "Every Time I Close My Eyes" on YouTube

"Every Time I Close My Eyes" is a song written, produced and performed by American musician Babyface, released in January 1997 by Epic Records as the second single from his fourth album, The Day (1996). Saxophonist Kenny G performs saxophone on the track, while Mariah Carey performs backing vocals (after Babyface did the same for her on "Melt Away", a track written by Carey and Babyface that appeared on her 1995 album Daydream). An alternate version without Carey's vocals and additional sax elements is included on Kenny G's The Moment (1996).

The song was met with commercial and critical acclaim, peaking at number six in the Billboard Hot 100 chart in United States and at number 13 in the United Kingdom. At the 40th Grammy Awards this song received a nomination for Best Male Pop Vocal Performance, which it lost to "Candle in the Wind" by Elton John. For the music video of this single, Babyface received a MTV Video Music Award nomination for Best Male Video, losing to "Devil's Haircut" by Beck.

On Shawn Stockman’s On The Note podcast. Babyface admitted that the song was originally written for Luther Vandross, who subsequently turned it down.

== Critical reception ==
On the AllMusic review, "Every Time I Close My Eyes" was awarded with three stars out of five. Larry Flick from Billboard praised the song, writing that it shows Babyface "at his all-around best." He added, "Complemented by harmonies from Mariah Carey, he weaves a sweetly romantic tale on top of a quietly shuffling pop/R&B groove. His performance has an engaging, soulful flexibility that never flies over the top into over-compensation. He's wise enough to let the song properly unfold and work its magic. There is no doubt that listeners of every imaginable format will be humming this gem within seconds—and then for months to come." A reviewer from Music Week rated it four out of five, stating that "multi-talented Babyface shows why he is worth 12 Grammy nominations on this classy, sultry ballad on which he is joined by Mariah Carey and Kenny G." The magazine's Alan Jones complimented it as "one of the cutest little Babyface records yet—a pretty, easy-paced ballad impeccably played and sung with sweetly cooed verses and a chorus which sticks in the brain."

== Chart performance ==
The track debuted at number 19 on the Billboard Hot 100 dated February 1, 1997 and climb to its peak at number six seven weeks later, spending 26 weeks in the chart. On the Hot R&B/Hip-Hop Songs chart, peaked at number 5. Overseas, the single reached number 13 on the UK Singles Chart. At the Billboard Hot 100 and Hot R&B/Hip-Hop Songs Year-End charts of 1997, this song ranked at number 26. "Every Time I Close My Eyes" was certified gold by the RIAA and sold 700,000 copies.

== Track listing ==
- CD single
1. "Every Time I Close My Eyes" (Radio edit) – 4:11
2. "Lady, Lady" – 4:23
- Digital download
1. "Every Time I Close My Eyes" (Timbaland remix) – 4:51
- UK CD maxi single (6642492)
1. "Every Time I Close My Eyes" (Radio edit) – 4:12
2. "Every Time I Close My Eyes" (Linslee Campbell remix) – 5:53
3. "Every Time I Close My Eyes" (Every Time I Feel the Groove remix) – 4:43
4. "Every Time I Close My Eyes" (Every Time I Feel The Funk remix) – 4:44
5. "Every Time I Close My Eyes" (House of Music remix) – 5:13

== Charts ==
=== Weekly charts ===
| Chart (1997) | Peak position |
|---|---|
| Australia (ARIA) | 40 |
| Germany (GfK) | 87 |
| Netherlands (Single Top 100) | 93 |
| New Zealand (Recorded Music NZ) | 8 |
| Scotland Singles (Official Charts) | 38 |
| UK Singles (Official Charts) | 13 |
| UK Hip Hop/R&B (Official Charts) | 3 |
| US Billboard Hot 100 | 6 |
| US Adult Contemporary (Billboard) | 17 |
| US Adult Pop Airplay (Billboard) | 29 |
| US Hot R&B/Hip-Hop Songs (Billboard) | 5 |
| US Pop Airplay (Billboard) | 12 |
| US Rhythmic Airplay (Billboard) | 4 |

=== Year-end charts ===
| Chart (1997) | Position |
|---|---|
| US Billboard Hot 100 | 26 |
| US Hot R&B/Hip-Hop Songs (Billboard) | 26 |

== Certifications and sales ==
| Region | Certification | Certified units/sales |
|---|---|---|
| United States (RIAA) | Platinum | 1,000,000^{‡} |
^{‡} Sales+streaming figures based on certification alone.

== Personnel ==
The following people contributed to "Every Time I Close My Eyes":

- Babyface – vocals, keyboards, drum programming
- Mariah Carey – vocals
- Kenny G – soprano saxophone
- Greg Phillinganes – acoustic piano
- Michael Thompson – guitars
- Nathan East – bass
- Sheila E – percussion

== Production ==
- Babyface – producer
- L.A. Reid – producer
- Daryl Simmons – producer
- Brad Gilderman – engineer
- Thom Russo – engineer
- Mick Guzauski – mixing
- Dave Way – mixing
