= Scream (Michael Jackson and Janet Jackson song) =

Single by Michael and Janet Jackson

from the album HIStory: Past, Present and Future, Book I
- A-side: "Childhood"
- Released: May 29, 1995
- Recorded: October–December 1994
- Studio: The Hit Factory (New York City); Flyte Tyme (Edina, Minnesota)
- Genre: Dance-pop; electronic; electronic rock; funk; R&B
- Length: 4:38; 4:04 (single edit)
- Label: Epic
- Songwriters: Michael Jackson; Janet Jackson; Jimmy Jam and Terry Lewis
- Producers: Jimmy Jam and Terry Lewis; Michael Jackson; Janet Jackson

Michael Jackson singles chronology
"Gone Too Soon" (1993)	"Scream" / "Childhood" (1995)	"You Are Not Alone" (1995)

Janet Jackson singles chronology
"Whoops Now" / "What'll I Do" (1995)	"Scream" (1995)	"Runaway" (1995)

Music video
- "Scream" on YouTube

"Scream" is a song by American singers and siblings Michael and Janet Jackson. It was released as the lead single of Michael Jackson's ninth studio album, HIStory: Past, Present and Future, Book I (1995). It was released as a double A-side with "Childhood", a solo song by Michael. The single was released on May 29, 1995.

"Scream" is an aggressive, retaliatory song directed at the tabloid media and their coverage of the child sexual abuse accusations made against Michael Jackson in 1993. It was written, composed and produced by Jimmy Jam and Terry Lewis, Michael Jackson, and Janet Jackson; Michael played many of the instruments. It incorporates elements of dance-pop, electronic, electronic rock, funk, and R&B. Recording for "Scream" took place at the Hit Factory in New York City in October 1994 and at Flyte Tyme Studios in Edina, Minnesota in December 1994. The song was leaked to radio stations early, despite Epic Records' attempt to keep it off air until the release date.

Generally well received amongst critics, it has been compared favorably to other songs by Michael Jackson. The corresponding music video remains one of his most critically acclaimed; it won three MTV Video Music Awards and the Grammy Award for Best Music Video. At a cost of $7 million, it was listed in the Guinness World Records as the most expensive music video ever made; however, director Mark Romanek has refuted the claim, saying that there were two other music videos from the same era which cost "millions more" than the video for "Scream".

"Scream" would become the first single in the 37-year history of Billboard to debut in the top five on the US Billboard Hot 100, peaking at number five. Elsewhere, it topped the charts in Italy, New Zealand, and Spain while reaching the top five in Australia, Belgium, France, the Netherlands, Norway, Switzerland, and the United Kingdom. Michael performed "Scream" on his 1996–1997 HIStory World Tour. Following his death in 2009, Janet performed the song at the 2009 MTV Video Music Awards and on her 2011 Number Ones, Up Close and Personal as a tribute to him, the 2015–2016 Unbreakable World Tour, and on several dates of her 2017–2018 State of the World Tour. It was also included on her 2023–2024 Together Again Tour, and subsequent Las Vegas residency.

== Background ==
"Scream" is a song primarily directed at the tabloid press. As far back as the late 1980s, Jackson and the press had a difficult relationship. In 1986, tabloids claimed that Jackson slept in a hyperbaric oxygen chamber and had offered to buy the bones of Joseph Merrick (the "Elephant Man"), both of which Jackson vehemently denied. These stories inspired the derogatory nickname "Wacko Jacko", which Jackson despised. He stopped leaking untruths to the press, and the media began creating their own stories. In 1989, Jackson released "Leave Me Alone", a song about the victimization he felt by the press.

In 1993, the relationship between Jackson and the press came to a head when he was accused of child sexual abuse. Although never charged with a crime, Jackson was subject to intense media scrutiny while the criminal investigation took place. Complaints about the coverage and media included using sensational headlines to draw in readers and viewers when the content itself did not support the headline, accepting stories of Jackson's alleged criminal activity in return for money, accepting confidential, leaked material from the police investigation in return for money paid, using unflattering pictures of Jackson; and using headlines that strongly implied Jackson's guilt. At the time, Jackson said of the media reaction, "I will say I am particularly upset by the handling of the matter by the incredible, terrible mass media. At every opportunity, the media has dissected and manipulated these allegations to reach their own conclusions." Jackson began taking painkillers, Valium, Xanax and Ativan to deal with the stress of the allegations made against him. When he left the United States to go into rehabilitation, the media showed him little sympathy.

"Scream" / "Childhood" and HIStory were Jackson's first releases since the allegations, and the press was waiting to see if the album would sell well. One analyst for SoundScan expressed the opinion that the press were out of touch with the public when it came to Jackson; the public liked him, while the press did not. He believed that "naysayers" in the media would be left surprised with the commercial reception to the HIStory campaign.

=== Album booklet ===
In the HIStory: Past, Present and Future, Book I album booklet, there's an image of Gottfried Helnwein's 1981 watercolor "Das Lied / The Song", which is an image of a distressed child huddled in the corner of a room, screaming up at the ceiling. Jackson's handwritten lyrics to "Scream" were scrawled on the wall beside the child. Towards the end of the booklet is a copy of a child's letter to the President of the United States, Bill Clinton, asking him to end war, pollution, and to stop the negative press reports about Jackson.

== Production ==
"Scream"
Excerpt of the single "Scream". Both siblings' vocals can be heard in the audio sample, with Janet Jackson's vocals first.

Janet Jackson wanted to be involved with the project as a show of sibling support. It was the first time they had worked together since 1984, when Michael provided backing vocals on "Don't Stand Another Chance". Janet said that it was "very fun" working with her brother again and that seeing her brother's work was "interesting". "Scream" was written, composed and produced by the Jackson siblings, with Jimmy Jam and Terry Lewis.

It was the first time Michael Jackson had worked with Jam and Lewis, although Janet had worked with them successfully on numerous occasions. The album was created with the intention of following half R&B and half pop/rock themes, the same themes that brought Jackson success on his prior album, Dangerous. Jackson was credited for playing instruments such as keyboard, synthesizer, guitar, drums and percussion on the single and album.

In the song, Jackson tells the media to stop pressuring him and to stop misrepresenting the truth. Jon Pareles of The New York Times observed, "fear has turned to aggression. The music has polarized; it's either clipped, choppy and electronic or glossy and sumptuous, only occasionally trying to combine the two. Most of the time, Jackson sounds as if he's singing through clenched teeth, spitting out words in defiance of any and all persecutors". He believed that "Scream" had a similar sound to the music of Janet's acclaimed Rhythm Nation. The media noted that "Scream" and other songs from the album contained vulgar words absent from previous albums. "Scream" incorporates elements of pop, R&B, hip-hop, funk and rock.

=== Leaking of "Scream" ===
Two weeks before the official release of "Scream", Jackson happened to hear it on a Los Angeles radio station. The station was playing "Scream" once an hour until served with a cease and desist order from Epic Records. Two other stations in Philadelphia also received similar orders. All involved denied that Epic leaked them the song early. The song had been a closely guarded secret by the label and most staff members were not allowed access to a copy.

Though they potentially faced legal action, the Los Angeles radio station programmer noted that, "some things are more important... The record company was furious, lawyers were involved and the situation got hairy... But on a release as big as Michael Jackson's, there's no way we're going to wait if we receive a leak. It's a once-in-a-lifetime opportunity because his security is really insane."

== Reception ==
=== Critical reaction ===
Professional ratings
Review scores
Source	Rating
The Charlotte Post	2.5/5 stars
AllMusic	2.5/5 stars

Stephen Thomas Erlewine of AllMusic retrospectively expressed the opinion that the song "improved on the slamming beats of his earlier single 'Jam,'" a song that received critical acclaim in its own right, as the recipient of two Grammy nominations: Best R&B Vocal Performance and Best R&B Song. Deepika Reddy of The Daily Collegian wrote, "The lyrics to the album's debut single and video 'Scream' are for the first time in Jackson's convoluted career, painfully direct. He sings 'Stop pressuring me/Stop pressuring me/It makes me want to scream' with a force and resentment that's new and surpassing." "'Scream' and 'Tabloid Junkie' have a raw aspect that Jackson hasn't approached since a near-miss with 'Billie Jean.'"

Music & Media noted "the sound of radio interference and frenzied swingbeat." Tim Jeffery from Music Week's RM Dance Update gave it four out of five, stating that it is "obviously a chart hit". Another RM editor, James Hamilton deemed it a "typically yelped and for once genuine pain filled jitterer duetted with sister Janet." James Hunter of Rolling Stone said that, "the excellent current single 'Scream' or the first-rate R&B ballad 'You Are Not Alone' – manage to link the incidents of Jackson's infamous recent past to universal concepts like injustice or isolation. When he bases his music in the bluntness of hip-hop, Jackson sketches funky scenarios denouncing greed, blanket unreliability and false accusation." He went on to say of 'Scream' and 'Tabloid Junkie', "[these] two adventurous Jam and Lewis thumpers work completely: Jackson's slippery voice is caught in mammoth funk-rock constructions. They're reminiscent of Janet Jackson's hits, in which Jam and Lewis allow space for lush vocal harmonies taken from the Triumph-era Jacksons; the choruses of 'Tabloid Junkie' in particular sing out with quick-voiced warnings about the failings of media truth."

Patrick MacDonald of The Seattle Times called 'Scream' the best song on the album. He continued, "The refrain of "Stop pressurin' me!" is compelling, and he spits out the lyrics with drama and purpose. The song has bite and infectious energy." MacDonald did, however, consider the use of profanity unnecessary. Tony Cross from Smash Hits gave it a top score of five out of five, writing, "This really is dangerous. Just like 'Black & White' went in the face of Michael's "white" look, so 'Scream' goes in the face of everything you'd expect. Police sirens, anger (Stop questioning me — you know you make me wanna scream), his sister's small but vital contribution (I was disgusted by the injustice). This is Michael fighting back. And he's delivered what could be a knock-out blow. Incredible." Richard Harrington of The Washington Post, however, called it "dull and musically uninvolved." He was also of the opinion that it sounded like 'Jam' from 1991, thus dated. 'Scream' was nominated for "Best Pop Collaboration with Vocals" at the 1996 American Music Awards, and shortly afterward it gained a Grammy nomination for "Best Pop Collaboration with Vocals".

=== Commercial reception of "Scream" ===
"Scream" was a worldwide hit. In the US it was the first song in the 37-year history of Billboard to debut at number five, where it peaked. The single was certified platinum by the RIAA and sold 700,000 copies domestically. It reached number one in Italy, Spain, and New Zealand, number two in Australia and Norway and number three in the UK. It became a top five hit in every major music market. A remix of "Scream" was also issued in the UK which charted at number 43 and in 2009 re-entered the UK charts at number 70.

== Music video ==
=== Production ===
In "Scream", Jackson and his sister Janet angrily retaliate against the media for misrepresentation to the public. The acclaimed video was shot primarily in black and white, at a cost of $7 million.

The 4:47-minute music video for "Scream" was filmed in May 1995 and was directed by Mark Romanek with choreography by Travis Payne, LaVelle Smith Jr, Tina Landon, Sacha Lucashenko, and Sean Cheesman, and the production being designed by Tom Foden. Jackson did not create the "concept" for the video, which he had often done in the past, but left it to Romanek. Jackson later described the making of "Scream" as a collaborative effort. The song and its accompanying video are a response to the backlash Jackson received from the media in 1993.

Foden commented, "Mark had written the treatment and the general idea was that Michael and Janet were on this large spacecraft. And they were alone... They were getting away from Earth, and the different sets were the different environments on the spacecraft where they could have a little bit of fun and where they could relax." Production of the music video's 13-piece set was restricted to a one-month period and was produced by Foden and art directors Richard Berg, Jeff Hall, and Martin Mervel. Foden described the assignment as a "military operation", explaining, "The idea was to give each of the art directors three sets: a complicated one, a not-so-complicated one, and one of the smaller, easier vignettes."

The visual effects were created by Visualist Ash Beck, CGI artist Richard "Doc" Baily and Alex Frisch. Typography in the video was designed by P. Scott Makela. Jackson was happy to work with his sister again, explaining that as they still had a passion for dancing it reminded him of "old times." Janet Jackson revealed on her 2022 self-titled documentary film that the two worked separately on set (Michael working nights and Janet working days) and that his team limited her access to the soundstage when Michael was filming which she attributed to an effort to keep things competitive between them. She also stated the video was supposed to be filmed over three days, and was "supposed to cost a lot less."

In the video, Janet Jackson takes on a darker persona, previously unseen in her own music videos. Jim Farber of the New York Daily News described her as "Sporting a thick thatch of wig hair, and eyes darkened by coal-black makeup... sullen and arty... Janet, however, never looked tougher, or more in control." The video has influences of Japanese sci-fi anime; in the background screens, several clips can be seen of the television series Zillion (1987) and Babel II (OVA, 1992), and the films Vampire Hunter D (1985) and Akira (1988).

=== Synopsis ===
The video begins with a sign showing the siblings' names which splits away to reveal a logo of the song's title. The scene then changes to a spacecraft traveling past Earth before the camera zooms in inside. The lights come on and reveal Michael and Janet inside individual capsules. During this sequence, the song's intro, a soundtrack of noise music with heavy sub-bass, uncharacteristic for the song's style, is heard. Suddenly, the spacecraft zooms out through the outer part of the galaxy, causing Michael and Janet to grimace in pain, and the song starts when Michael screams and slams his hands on his capsule's lid, shattering it.

In the first verse, Michael is seen in a room where he is floating in zero gravity. Then, Michael is shown in a room with several guitars where he breaks one while Janet sings the next verse. Then, it shows Michael dancing on the wall while Janet looks at her nails before playing a game of tag. Then, it shows Michael and Janet in the gallery using a remote control to switch between artwork such as Andy Warhol's Self-Portrait, Jackson Pollock's Number 32, and René Magritte's The Son of Man. Next, it shows both Michael and Janet in the media room, where they are playing a video game, which Michael wins. Then, Janet sports a skimpy bikini in some scenes while at the core of the craft, grabs at her breasts, gives the camera a middle finger, and simulates male urination. Michael is shown taking controls into some kind of observation room. (In outtakes to the music video, there is a still color photograph of Michael also giving the camera a middle finger.)

Michael is then seen wearing a black robe in a white room where he is meditating before screaming, which breaks the glass above him. The scene then shifts, showing Michael and Janet performing a dance breakdown. Then, it cuts back to the media room where Janet is dancing with Michael being seen on the television screen while Janet does the same thing with Michael. Then, Michael is seen playing a tennis game where he is using a robotic orb to break jars.

=== Reception ===
The video premiered in June 1995, on MTV and BET and the next evening on ABC's Primetime Live during Diane Sawyer's interview with Jackson and Lisa Marie Presley. The interview was broadcast to approximately 64 million viewers. The video is one of Jackson's most critically acclaimed. Heather Phares of Allmusic described the video as a "stylish, interstellar clip." James Hunter of Rolling Stone called it a contemporary video, "in which Michael and his sister Janet jump around like '90s fashion kids trapped in a spaceship stolen from a Barbarella film set." Jim Farber called it a "supercool black-and-white clip... The clip's great allure is that neither of the siblings look quite real. While the visuals hold barely any connection to the lyric, and seem to have no clear point, the weird look captivates." He was of the opinion that while Michael Jackson outshines his sister in the vocals, it is Janet Jackson who gives the better performance in the music video.

In 1995, Scream gained 11 MTV Video Music Award nominations—more than any other music video—including Best Video of the Year and won Best Dance Video, Best Choreography, and Best Art Direction. In reaction, Jackson stated that he was "very honored", explaining that he had worked "very hard" and was "very happy" with the reception up to that point. It was also given a Billboard Music Award for best Pop/Rock video. A year later, it won a Grammy for Best Music Video, Short Form; shortly afterward Guinness World Records listed it as the most expensive music video ever made at a cost of $7 million, although it was later refuted by the director. In 2001, VH1 placed "Scream" at number nine on their list of the 100 greatest music videos.

=== Influence ===
"Scream" was a creative influence on other music videos, especially during the Y2K pop era, such as the 1999 release of the award-winning "No Scrubs" by TLC. This influence was also present on the 2008 release of "Shawty Get Loose" by Lil Mama and Chris Brown. Reacting to the comparisons made between the videos, Mama explained, "I feel honored, because that was one of the initial goals, and I feel that it was executed well." She added that the emulation was intentional and that Brown was the only logical choice to step into Michael Jackson's role. Ciara and Nicki Minaj's music video for their single "I'm Out" was heavily influenced by the video by referencing the all-white scenery and attire. Tyga's 2018 music video "Dip", also featuring Minaj, was also heavily influenced by the "Scream" video.

==== MTV Video Music Awards tribute ====
"As the future-shock intro to "Scream" hit the screen, and plumes of white fog sprouted up amid a space-age set made up of white honeycombs, Janet kicked through a mirror and emerged to screams from fans and celebs alike, as Alicia Keys, Beyoncé and Pink hooted their excitement".

— Gil Kaufman, MTV

In September 2009, Janet Jackson performed "Scream" on the 2009 MTV Video Music Awards as part of a medley tribute to Michael Jackson, who died three months earlier. MTV General Manager Stephen Friedman stated "[t]his is not something that just came together—we've been in talks with [Janet] for a while... We felt there was no one better than Janet to anchor it and send a really powerful message." She worked with several world-renowned choreographers, including Dave Scott, Cris Judd, Brian Friedman, Wade Robson, Tyce Diorio, Travis Payne, Jeri Slaughter, Laurie Ann Gibson, Mia Michaels and Tina Landon, with her personal creative director, Gil Duldulao, coordinating the performance.

Gil Kaufman of MTV commented "[w]earing a black-and-white, skintight leather dress with matching pants, Janet busted some of her and Michael's signature moves, flawlessly re-creating her late brother's steps as they were projected on the screen behind her." Michael Slezak of Entertainment Weekly commented, "she worked that stage harder than an underpaid assistant doin' overtime, and as tributes go, this was as energetic as it was heartfelt."

== Impact and legacy ==
Upon its release, "Scream" debuted at number 5 on the Billboard Hot 100 chart, becoming the first song to enter the chart within the top 5. The previous record for highest debut was held by the Beatles' "Let It Be", which entered the chart at number 6 in March 1970.

In 1995, Scream gained 11 MTV Video Music Award nominations—more than any other music video—including Best Video of the Year and won Best Dance Video, Best Choreography, and Best Art Direction. In reaction, Jackson stated that he was "very honored", explaining that he had worked "very hard" and was "very happy" with the reception up to that point. It was also given a Billboard Music Award for best Pop/Rock video. A year later, it won a Grammy for Best Music Video, Short Form; shortly afterward Guinness World Records listed it as the most expensive music video ever made at a cost of $7 million, although this was later refuted by the director. In 2001, VH1 placed "Scream" at number nine on their list of the 100 greatest music videos.

The David Morales remix of "Scream" was released as a single in the United Kingdom on June 24, 1995, peaking at number 43 and dropping to number 57 a week later. It remained on the charts for only two weeks.

In 1997, "Scream" was remixed for Jackson's remix album Blood on the Dance Floor: HIStory in the Mix. Entitled "Scream Louder" (Flyte Tyme remix), the remix used elements from the Sly and the Family Stone song "Thank You (Falettinme Be Mice Elf Agin)". Another official remix was produced by Naughty by Nature, called the "Naughty" remix, having a new urban R&B instrumental beat and a rap verse by Treach.

Despite being known as Scary Movie throughout its production, the 1996 film Scream, directed by Wes Craven, changed its name to Scream after Harvey Weinstein heard Jackson's song on the radio.

== Track listings ==
- US CD single
1. "Scream" – 4:37
2. "Childhood" (Theme from Free Willy 2) – 4:27
- US 12-inch single

A1. "Scream" (Classic Club mix) – 9:00
A2. "Scream" (Pressurized Dub Pt. 1) – 10:06
B1. "Scream" (Naughty Main mix) – 5:42
B2. "Scream" (Dave "Jam" Extended Urban remix) – 5:09
B3. "Scream" (single edit 2) – 4:04
B4. "Childhood" (theme from Free Willy 2) – 4:27

== Personnel ==
- Produced and arranged by Jimmy Jam, Terry Lewis, Michael Jackson, and Janet Jackson
- Recorded and mixed by Bruce Swedien and Steve Hodge
- Michael Jackson – lead and backing vocals, guitars, percussion
- Janet Jackson – lead and backing vocals
- Jimmy Jam and Terry Lewis – keyboards, percussion

== Charts ==
=== Weekly charts ===
1995 weekly chart performance for "Scream"
Chart (1995)	Peak position
Australia (ARIA)	2
Austria (Ö3 Austria Top 40)	9
Belgium (Ultratop 50 Flanders)	5
Belgium (Ultratop 50 Wallonia)	3
Canada Top Singles (RPM)	12 (Note: The main RPM single chart was airplay-only from September 1988 until the magazine's end in December 2000.)
Canada Adult Contemporary (RPM)	51
Canada Dance/Urban (RPM)	6
Canada Retail Singles (The Record)	5
Canada Contemporary Hit Radio (The Record)	10
Denmark (Tracklisten)	1
Europe (European Hot 100)	1
Europe (European Dance Radio)	1
Europe (European Hit Radio)	1
Finland (IFPI)	1
France (SNEP)	4
France Airplay (SNEP)	2
Germany (GfK)	8
Hungary (Mahasz)	1
Iceland (Íslenski Listinn Topp 40)	33
Ireland (IRMA)	6
Israel (Israeli Singles Chart)	13
Italy (Musica e dischi)	1
Italy Airplay (Music & Media)	1
Lithuania (M-1)	1
Netherlands (Dutch Top 40)	3
Netherlands (Single Top 100)	4
New Zealand (RIANZ)	1
Norway (VG-lista)	2
Poland Airplay (Music & Media)	5
Scottish Singles Sales (Official Charts)	6
Spain (AFYVE)	1
Spanish Airplay (Music & Media)	1
Sweden (Sverigetopplistan)	8
Switzerland (Schweizer Hitparade)	3
UK Singles (Official Charts)	3
UK Dance (Official Charts)	3
UK Hip Hop/R&B (Official Charts)	1
UK Airplay (Music Week)	4
UK Pop Tip Club Chart (Music Week)	31
US Billboard Hot 100	5
US Adult Contemporary (Billboard)	32
US Dance Club Songs (Billboard)	1
US Dance Singles Sales (Billboard) with "Childhood"	1
US Hot R&B/Hip-Hop Songs (Billboard)	2
US Pop Airplay (Billboard)	20
US Rhythmic Airplay (Billboard)	5
US Cash Box Top 100	3
Zimbabwe (ZIMA)	1

2009 weekly chart performance for "Scream"
Chart (2009)	Peak position
Switzerland (Schweizer Hitparade)	93
UK Singles (OCC)	70
US Digital Songs (Billboard)	70

=== Year-end charts ===
Year-end chart performance for "Scream"
Chart (1995)	Position
Australia (ARIA)	47
Belgium (Ultratop 50 Flanders)	89
Belgium (Ultratop 50 Wallonia)	30
Brazil (Crowley)	79
Canada Top Singles (RPM)	87
Europe (European Hot 100)	36
Europe (European Hit Radio)	10
France (SNEP)	59
Germany (Media Control)	95
Italy (Musica e dischi)	34
Netherlands (Dutch Top 40)	89
Netherlands (Single Top 100)	55
New Zealand (RIANZ)	22
Sweden (Topplistan)	79
Switzerland (Schweizer Hitparade)	28
UK Singles (OCC)	57
US Billboard Hot 100	56
US Hot R&B/Hip-Hop Songs (Billboard)	62
US Dance Club Play (Billboard)	7
US Maxi-Singles Sales (Billboard)	19
US Cash Box Top 100	46

== Certifications ==
Certifications for "Scream"
Region	Certification	Certified units/sales
Australia (ARIA)	Gold	35,000^{^}
New Zealand (RMNZ)	Gold	5,000^{*}
United Kingdom (BPI)	Silver	200,000^{‡}
United States (RIAA)	Platinum	1,000,000^{^}
^{*} Sales figures based on certification alone.^{^} Shipments figures based on certification alone.^{‡} Sales+streaming figures based on certification alone.

== Release history ==
Release dates and formats for "Scream"
Region	Date	Format(s)	Label(s)	Ref.
United States	May 23, 1995	Rhythmic contemporary; contemporary hit radio	Epic	
Australia	May 29, 1995	CD; cassette	Epic	
United Kingdom	May 29, 1995	CD1; cassette	Epic	
United Kingdom	June 5, 1995	CD2	Epic	
United Kingdom	June 12, 1995	7-inch vinyl; 12-inch vinyl	Epic	
Japan	June 15, 1995	Mini-CD	Epic	
Australia	June 19, 1995	12-inch vinyl	Epic	

== Cover versions ==
- In 2011, Patrick Stump of Fall Out Boy covered the song in an a cappella mash-up tribute to Jackson along with Jackson's "Billie Jean", "Man in the Mirror", "Thriller", and several other Jackson songs over pre-recorded backing vocals.
- In 2013, by Christina Aguilera on The Voice.
- "Scream" was also covered in Glee's Season 3 episode "Michael", with Michael's section sung by Artie Abrams (Kevin McHale) and Janet's section sung by Mike Chang (Harry Shum Jr.). The video was also re-created for the dream sequence.

== See also ==
- List of most expensive music videos

== Bibliography ==
- Campbell, Lisa (1995). Michael Jackson: The King of Pops Darkest Hour. Branden. ISBN 0828320039.
- George, Nelson (2004). Michael Jackson: The Ultimate Collection booklet. Sony BMG.
- Pratt, Douglas (2005). Doug Pratt's DVD: Movies, Television, Music, Art, Adult, and More!. UNET 2 Corporation. ISBN 1932916016.
- Lewis, Jel (2005). Michael Jackson, the King of Pop: The Big Picture: the Music! the Man! the Legend! the Interviews!. Amber Books Publishing. ISBN 097497790X.
- Taraborrelli, J. Randy (2004). The Magic and the Madness. Terra Alta, WV: Headline. ISBN 0330420054.
