= Gone Too Soon =

Single by Michael Jackson

from the album Dangerous
- B-side: "Human Nature"; "She's Out of My Life"; "Thriller"
- Released: December 1, 1993
- Recorded: June 1990
- Genre: Operatic pop
- Length: 3:22
- Label: Epic
- Songwriters: Larry Grossman; Buz Kohan
- Producers: Michael Jackson; Bruce Swedien

Michael Jackson singles chronology
"Will You Be There" (1993)	"Gone Too Soon" (1993)	"Scream" / "Childhood" (1995)

Music video
- "Gone Too Soon" on YouTube

"Gone Too Soon" is a ballad recorded and popularized by American singer and recording artist Michael Jackson. It was written and composed by Larry Grossman and Buz Kohan.

Dionne Warwick first performed (but never recorded) the song in February 1983 on a TV special titled Here's Television Entertainment as a tribute to many performers, including Janis Joplin, Elvis Presley, John Belushi, Cass Elliot, John Lennon, Bobby Darin, Minnie Riperton, Sam Cooke, Harry Chapin, Buddy Holly, Otis Redding, Jimi Hendrix, Jim Croce, Bobby Van, and Karen Carpenter, who had died days earlier. Later on the same day, Jackson called Kohan explaining he had wept while watching the performance and that he felt he wanted to record it some day.

Jackson's version of "Gone Too Soon" was dedicated to the memory of Jackson's friend Ryan White, a teenager from Kokomo, Indiana who came to national attention, after being expelled from his school for having HIV/AIDS. This version was produced by Jackson and co-produced by Bruce Swedien for Jackson's eighth studio album, Dangerous (1991). The song was also mixed by Swedien, and featured instrumentation by artists such as David Paich, Steve Porcaro, Michael Boddicker, Abraham Laboriel and Paulinho da Costa.

The song was released on December 1, 1993, as the ninth and final single from the Dangerous album. Following its release—on World AIDS Day of 1993—"Gone Too Soon" became a moderate chart success in several countries: France, Germany, the Netherlands, New Zealand, Switzerland, the UK, and Zimbabwe. The song was released as a cassette single in the US. "Gone Too Soon" received mixed reviews from music critics.

"Gone Too Soon" was promoted with a music video directed by Bill DiCicco, which showed footage of Jackson and White together, as well as scenes from the latter's funeral. In January 1993, a live performance by Jackson at Bill Clinton's inaugural celebration also served as a promotional platform, for both the song and AIDS-related funding. "Gone Too Soon" later received more exposure, following the deaths of both Diana, Princess of Wales, and Jackson himself.

== Background and production ==
Ryan White was an American teenager from Kokomo, Indiana who became a national poster child for HIV/AIDS in the United States after being expelled from school because of his infection. A hemophiliac, he became infected with HIV from a contaminated blood treatment and, when diagnosed in 1984, was given six months to live. Though doctors said he posed no risk to other students, AIDS was poorly understood at the time, and when White tried to return to school, many parents and teachers in Kokomo rallied against his attendance. A lengthy legal battle with the school system ensued, and media coverage of the struggle made White into a national celebrity and spokesman for AIDS research and public education.

During this time, White was befriended by singer Michael Jackson. White's mother Jeanne commented on the friendship, "It's a really good relationship. They have a good time. [Michael Jackson] treats [Ryan White] like he's not sick. And Ryan treats Michael like he's not a celebrity." The pop star bought the teenager a red Ford Mustang, and invited White and his mother to spend time at his Neverland Ranch in Santa Barbara County, California. Surprising his doctors, White lived five years longer than initially predicted and died in April 1990, shortly before he would have completed high school. His funeral was attended by Jackson, as well as English musician Elton John, media personality Phil Donahue, First Lady of the United States Barbara Bush, and 1000 other mourners.

Other projects took precedence for years, but Jackson ended up recording the song for his Dangerous album, in memory of White. The prelude to the song was composed, arranged and conducted by American musician Marty Paich. Bruce Swedien, who had worked extensively on Jackson's Thriller, was drafted to record and mix the ballad. The music engineer also served as the co-producer for "Gone Too Soon", with Jackson producing the song. Prior to the production of the finalized version of "Gone Too Soon", Jackson had recorded a demo version of the song, which featured different vocals and a "perfect sunflower" lyric. To date, the demo has not received an official release, but that lyric was used in the song by Jackson when he sang it at the 1993 Presidential Gala for then President-elect Bill Clinton.

== Release and reception ==
"Gone Too Soon" was released on December 1, 1993—World AIDS Day—as the ninth and final single from the Dangerous album. It charted in numerous countries outside of the US. In the UK singles chart, "Gone Too Soon"—which featured an instrumental version on its B-side—reached number 33, becoming Jackson's ninth Top 40 hit from the one album (Dangerous). He thus equalled his own record, set with Bad and its accompanying singles. Outside of the UK, in the African country of Zimbabwe, "Gone Too Soon" became a hit, charting at number 3 on their singles chart. The song reached number three in The Netherlands, number 32 in France, and number 33 in Switzerland. In Germany, "Gone Too Soon" peaked at number 45.

Journalist David Browne, writing for Entertainment Weekly, claimed that the song "recasts the equally melodramatic Off the Wall hit "She's Out of My Life"; he noted that Jackson sobs during the finale of both songs. The staff of the Kansas City Star alleged that "Gone Too Soon" made syrup seem "tart in comparison". The Miami Herald noted that Jackson "rediscover[ed]" his falsetto voice on the track, while the Milwaukee Journal Sentinel compared his tenor to that featured on a Broadway ballad. Alan Jones from Music Week wrote, "This cloying ballad from Dangerous will be used as an indicator of public support or otherwise for Jackson in these troubled times. Unfortunately, it's probably too saccharine to earn a place in the Top 10." Leesa Daniels from Smash Hits gave it five out of five, saying it "shows off his wonderful voice in a tear-jerking epic" from the album. The Toronto Star's Peter Howell described the song as a "simply beautiful ode to youthful AIDS victim Ryan White". Edna Gundersen of USA Today, reviewing the songs on Dangerous, offered the opinion that Jackson's "heartfelt" delivery redeemed the "fairy-tale cliches" of "Gone Too Soon". She felt that the song was "shamelessly Disneyesque". The Worcester Telegram Gazette added to the reviews, stating that "Gone Too Soon" was an "orchestra-drenched ballad full of insipid little boy innocence".

== Promotion ==
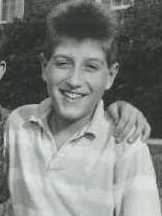
Footage of Ryan White was used in the music video of "Gone Too Soon".

"Gone Too Soon" was promoted with a short music video directed by Bill DiCicco. The footage in the music video featured scenes of Jackson and White together, as well as brief coverage from White's funeral. Home movies, donated by White's mother Jeanne, were also shown in the short film. At the time of its creation, Jeanne White revealed that the video for "Gone Too Soon" would demonstrate how much Jackson cared for her ill son. The music video was later featured on Jackson's 1993 VHS Dangerous: The Short Films. An alternate video was released a few months after Michael's death, and was later released on Michael Jackson's Vision.

The song was further promoted with a live performance of "Gone Too Soon" at President-elect Bill Clinton's inauguration celebration, An American Reunion: The 52nd Presidential Inaugural Gala. The pop star dedicated his performance to White, and used the occasion to plead with the incoming president for funding toward AIDS-related research:

Thank you, mister President-elect, for inviting me to your inauguration gala. I would like to take a moment from this very public ceremony to speak of something very personal. It concerns a dear friend of mine who is no longer with us. His name is Ryan White. He was a hemophiliac who was diagnosed with the AIDS virus when he was thirteen. He died shortly after turning eighteen, the very time most young people are beginning to explore life's wonderful possibilities. My friend Ryan was a very bright, very brave, and very normal young man who never wanted to be a symbol or a spokesperson for a deadly disease. Over the years, I've shared many silly, happy, and painful moments with Ryan and I was with him at the end of his brief but eventful journey. Ryan is gone and just as anyone who has lost a loved one to AIDS, I miss him deeply and constantly. He is gone, but I want his life to have meaning beyond his passing. It is my hope, President-elect Clinton, that you and your administration commit the resources needed to eliminate this awful disease that took my friend, and ended so many promising lives before their time. This song is for you, Ryan.

— Michael Jackson, January 1993

== Cover versions ==
Babyface and Stevie Wonder duetted on the song during an MTV Unplugged performance in 1997, with the former performing and dedicating the song to Jackson in June and July 2009. American hip-hop artist b-Rabbit recorded a song entitled "Broken Hearts (R&B Remix)" that sampled Jackson's vocals in early 2012. Tichina Arnold sung the song in The Neighborhood episode "Porch Pirate"

== Death of Michael Jackson ==
Michael Jackson died on June 25, 2009, after suffering a cardiac arrest. His memorial service was held on July 7, 2009, at the Staples Center in Los Angeles, preceded by a private family service at Forest Lawn Memorial Park's Hall of Liberty. The event was reported to have been viewed by more than one billion people. At the memorial, R&B singer Usher performed "Gone Too Soon" as a tribute to the singer. During the performance, the entertainer—wearing dark sunglasses and a yellow rose pinned to the lapel of his jacket—approached Jackson's gold-plated casket, which was in attendance. Usher placed his left hand upon the coffin, before completing the final lyric—"gone too soon"—through tears.

== Personnel ==
- Music by Larry Grossman
- Lyrics by Buz Kohan
- Produced and solo vocal by Michael Jackson
- Co-produced by Bruce Swedien
- Recorded and mixed by Bruce Swedien
- Rhythm arrangement and keyboards by David Paich
- Orchestra arranged and conducted by Marty Paich
- David Paich, Steve Porcaro and Michael Boddicker – synthesizers
- Abraham Laboriel – bass
- Paulinho da Costa – percussion
- Prelude composed, arranged and conducted by Marty Paich

== Track listing ==
CD single

1. "Gone Too Soon" – 3:22
2. "Human Nature" – 4:06
3. "She's Out of My Life" – 3:38
4. "Thriller" – 5:57

CD promo

1. "Gone Too Soon" – 3:22
2. "Gone Too Soon" (instrumental) – 3:22

== Charts ==
Weekly chart performance for "Gone Too Soon"
Chart (1993–1994)	Peak position
Australia (ARIA Charts)	76
Europe (Eurochart Hot 100)	39
Europe (European Hit Radio)	27
France (SNEP)	32
Germany (Official German Charts)	45
Ireland (IRMA)	18
Netherlands (Dutch Top 40)	31
Netherlands (Single Top 100)	20
New Zealand (RIANZ)	6
Switzerland (Schweizer Hitparade)	33
UK Singles (OCC)	33
UK Airplay (ERA)	75
Zimbabwe (ZIMA)	3

2009 weekly chart performance for "Gone Too Soon"
Chart (2009)	Peak position
US Billboard Digital Songs	67

== See also ==
- "The Last Song", a single by Elton John, dedicated to Ryan White

== Bibliography ==
- Campbell, Lisa (1993). Michael Jackson: The King of Pop. Branden. ISBN 0-8283-1957-X.
- Campbell, Lisa (1995). Michael Jackson: The King of Pop's Darkest Hour. Branden. ISBN 0-8283-2003-9.
- George, Nelson (2004). Michael Jackson: The Ultimate Collection booklet. Sony BMG.
- Halstead, Craig (2003). Michael Jackson the Solo Years. Authors On Line. ISBN 0-7552-0091-8.
- Halstead, Craig (2007). Michael Jackson: For the Record. Authors On Line. ISBN 978-0-7552-0267-6.
- Taraborrelli, J. Randy (2004). The Magic and the Madness. Headline. ISBN 0-330-42005-4.
