= The Day (Babyface album) =

Studio album by Babyface
- Released: October 22, 1996
- Studios: Brandon's Way Recording; The Record Plant; Conway Recording; Ocean Way Recording; Capitol Recording Studios (Hollywood, California); The TracKen Place (Beverly Hills, California); Larrabee Sound Studios (Los Angeles, California); Quad Studios (Manhattan, New York); Barking Doctor Recording (Mount Kisco, New York)
- Genre: R&B
- Length: 46:12
- Label: Epic
- Producer: Kenneth "Babyface" Edmonds

Babyface chronology
For the Cool in You (1993)	The Day (1996)	Unplugged (1997)

Singles from The Day
- 1. "This Is for the Lover in You" Released: October 5, 1996; 2. "Talk to Me" Released: October 29, 1996; 3. "Every Time I Close My Eyes" Released: January 1997; 4. "How Come, How Long" Released: July 7, 1997

The Day is the fourth studio album by American R&B singer Babyface. It was released by Epic Records on October 22, 1996, in the United States. The album peaked at number 6 on the US Billboard 200 and number 4 on the Top R&B/Hip-Hop Albums, also reaching the top ten on the Dutch Albums Chart. The Day was certified double platinum by the Recording Industry Association of America (RIAA), and received Grammy Award nominations for Album of the Year and Best R&B Album respectively.

From the album, the track "Every Time I Close My Eyes" was nominated for Best Male Pop Vocal Performance. A duet with Stevie Wonder, titled "How Come, How Long", was also Grammy nominated for Best Pop Collaboration with Vocals. Additionally, the singles "This Is for the Lover in You" and "Every Time I Close My Eyes" both reached number 6 on the US Billboard Hot 100.

== Critical reception ==
Professional ratings
Review scores
Source	Rating
AllMusic	4.5/5 stars
Entertainment Weekly	A−
Los Angeles Times	3.5/4 stars
Muzik	3/5 stars
The Rolling Stone Album Guide	3.5/5 stars
The Village Voice	A−

AllMusic editor Leo Stanley found that The Day "confirms his skill for subtle, inventive songwriting and accessible, polished yet soulful production [...] He is still compelling – his voice is as smooth as silk, and nearly as seductive – but it doesn't quite have the force of personality as his greatest productions. Nevertheless, The Day qualifies as state-of-the-art mid-'90s soul, featuring a handful of terrific songs, and a lot of extremely pleasurable filler." David Browne from Entertainment Weekly wrote that on the album, Babyface "immerses himself in the same hot-tub soul he's applied to everyone from Toni Braxton to Eric Clapton. All the Babyface trademarks — the crisp, unobtrusive percussion, the silky guitars, the harmonies that blanket the melodies like a quilt — are laid out like a three-piece suit. But more so than any previous album he’s made, The Day is chockful of luscious, gently persuasive songs, from doe-eyed testimonials to his devotion to misty childhood reminiscences.

Connoe Johnson from The Los Angeles Times wrote: "This ballad-intensive album is long on the soothing, roses-and-candlelight romanticism that sets him apart from most of his hip-hop-oriented compatriots [...] There is a certain niche in R&B that he fills quite nicely. In a genre where many expressions of love and commitment require a parental-guidance sticker, spiritually stated songs such as "The Day (That You Gave Me a Son)" are rare." The New York Times editor Jon Pareles noted that with the album, "Babyface continues his sensitive-guy testimonials" and "certified [his] status as a superstar among pop peers." He also felt though, thtat "Babyface may have handed off too many of his best songs. About halfway through the album, the quality of the writing starts to dip, and despite the plush understatement of Babyface's arrangements, The Day ends up seeming skimpy."

== Commercial performance ==
The Day debuted and peaked at number six on the US Billboard 200 and number four on the Top R&B/Hip-Hop Albums chart. It marked Babyface's highest-charting release on the Billboard 200 yet. A steady seller, the album was certified both Gold and Platinum by the Recording Industry Association of America (RIAA) on January 8, 1997 and reached 2× Platinum status on July 23, 1997. By August 2005, it had sold 1.5 million units domestically. Internationally, The Day would mark Babyface's breakthrough as a performer, reaching the top ten in the Netherlands and the top 20 in Australia, Japan and New Zealand. It was certified Silver by the British Phonographic Industry (BPI), and Platinum by Music Canada, and became a Gold-seller in Australia and Japan.

== Track listing ==
The Day track listing
No.	Title	Writer(s)	Producer(s)	Length
1.	"Every Time I Close My Eyes" (featuring Kenny G and Mariah Carey)	Kenneth Edmonds	Babyface	4:56
2.	"Talk to Me"	Edmonds	Babyface	4:54
3.	"I Said I Love You"	Edmonds	Babyface	4:05
4.	"When Your Body Gets Weak"	Edmonds	Babyface	5:40
5.	"Simple Days"	Edmonds; Robbie Nevil; Emanuel Officer; Bradley Spalter	Babyface; Spalter^{[a]}	4:31
6.	"All Day Thinkin'"	Edmonds	Babyface; Gerald Baillergeau^{[a]}	4:23
7.	"Seven Seas"	Edmonds; Marc Nelson	Babyface	4:02
8.	"The Day (That You Gave Me a Son)"	Edmonds	Babyface	4:29
9.	"How Come, How Long" (featuring Stevie Wonder)	Edmonds; Wonder	Babyface	5:15
10.	"This Is for the Lover in You" (featuring LL Cool J, Howard Hewett, Jody Watley, and Jeffrey Daniels)	Howard Hewett; Dana Meyers; James Todd Smith	Babyface; LL Cool J^{[a]}	4:01
Total length:				46:12

Bonus tracks (2001 reissue)
No.	Title	Writer(s)	Producer(s)	Length
11.	"Every Time I Close My Eyes" (Timbaland Remix)	Edmonds	Babyface; Timbaland^{[b]}	4:50
12.	"Every Time I Close My Eyes" (Urban Soul Basement Mix)	Edmonds	Babyface; Urban Soul^{[b]}	4:40
13.	"This Is for the Lover in You" (Honey Lookin' Laced Extended Remix)	Hewett; Meyers	Babyface	5:26

Notes

- ^{^[a]} denotes a co-producer
- ^{^[b]} denotes an additional producer

== Personnel ==
Credits adapted from the album's liner notes.

- Engineered by Brad Gilderman and Thom Russo
- Mixed by Jon Gass, Mick Guzauski and Bob Brockmann
- Strings on "The Day" engineered by Humberto Gatica
- Background vocals on "Every Time I Close My Eyes" engineered by Mike Scott
- Mastered by Eddy Schreyer at Oasis Mastering
- MIDI Programmer: Randy Walker
- Production coordinator: Ivy Skoff
- Art direction: Bennet/Novak and company
- Design: Vincent Oto
- Booklet and Spike Photography: Anton Corbijn
- Cover photography: Beisig and Taylor
- Styling: Bernard C. Jacobs
- Grooming: Melvonne
- Hair: Tim Carter

== Charts ==
=== Weekly charts ===
Weekly chart performance for The Day
Chart (1996)	Peak position
Australian Albums (ARIA)	14
Canadian Albums (RPM)	24
Dutch Albums (Album Top 100)	10
French Albums (SNEP)	35
German Albums (Offizielle Top 100)	85
Japanese Albums (Oricon)	17
New Zealand Albums (RMNZ)	12
UK Albums (Official Charts)	34
US Billboard 200	6
US Top R&B/Hip-Hop Albums (Billboard)	4

=== Year-end charts ===
1996 year-end chart performance for The Day
Chart (1996)	Position
US Top R&B/Hip-Hop Albums (Billboard)	80

1997 year-end chart performance for The Day
Chart (1997)	Position
Australian Albums (ARIA)	83
Dutch Albums (Album Top 100)	55
US Billboard 200	55
US Top R&B/Hip-Hop Albums (Billboard)	34

== Certifications ==
Certifications for The Day
Region	Certification	Certified units/sales
Australia (ARIA)	Gold	35,000^{^}
Canada (Music Canada)	Platinum	100,000^{^}
Japan (RIAJ)	Gold	100,000^{^}
United Kingdom (BPI)	Silver	60,000^{^}
United States (RIAA)	2× Platinum	2,000,000^{^}
^{^} Shipments figures based on certification alone.
