= Christmas with Babyface =

Studio album by Babyface
- Released: October 27, 1998
- Studios: Brandon's Way Recording; Ocean Way (Hollywood)
- Genres: R&B; Christmas
- Length: 40:20
- Label: Epic
- Producers: Kenneth "Babyface" Edmonds; Walter Afanasieff

Babyface chronology
Unplugged (1997)	Christmas with Babyface (1998)	Babyface: A Collection of His Greatest Hits (2000)

Christmas with Babyface is the fifth studio album by American singer Babyface. It was released by Epic Records on October 27, 1998, in the United States. The album is a follow-up to his first live album, MTV Unplugged NYC 1997 (1997), as well as his first Christmas album. Produced by Walter Afanasieff, Christmas with Babyface consists of ten tracks, featuring one original song, "You Were There" from the film Simon Birch, and ten cover versions of Christmas standards and carols. It peaked at number 101 on the US Billboard 200 and number 34 on the US Top R&B/Hip-Hop Albums.

== Critical reception ==
Professional ratings
Review scores
Source	Rating
AllMusic	3/5 stars

AllMusic editor Leo Stanley wrote that "those years he spent perfecting his style were put to good use – not only did he turn into a reliable hitmaker, but he developed an alluring, mellow sound that appealed to all generations of listeners, which is exactly what is needed for a successful holiday album. And Christmas with Babyface is exactly that – a warm, friendly, and inviting holiday record, with enough soul for younger listeners and enough style for old folks. It may not be a classic, but it is a lovely record ideal for romantic winter nights or relaxed holiday parties."

== Track listing ==
All tracks were produced by Walter Afanasieff; except "You Were There," produced by Babyface.

Christmas with Babyface track listing
No.	Title	Length
1.	"Rudolph the Red-Nosed Reindeer"	4:03
2.	"Winter Wonderland"	3:13
3.	"The Christmas Song"	3:13
4.	"White Christmas"	4:37
5.	"The Little Drummer Boy"	4:04
6.	"I'll Be Home for Christmas"	3:58
7.	"It Came Upon a Midnight Clear"/"The First Noel"	4:16
8.	"Sleigh Ride"	3:32
9.	"Silent Night"	4:33
10.	"You Were There"	4:58

== Charts ==
Chart (1998)	Peak position
US Billboard 200	101
US Top R&B/Hip-Hop Albums (Billboard)	34

== Certifications ==
Region	Certification	Certified units/sales
Japan (RIAJ)	Gold	100,000^{^}
^{^} Shipments figures based on certification alone.
