= Mirage (disambiguation) =

A mirage is an optical phenomenon.

Mirage(s) or The Mirage may also refer to:

== Places ==
=== Hotels ===
- The Mirage, a hotel and casino resort on the Las Vegas Strip
  - Mirage Resorts, a hotel-casino operator; original owner of The Mirage
  - MGM Mirage, a hotel-casino operator formed by the merger of MGM Grand Inc. and Mirage Resorts

=== Other places ===
- El Mirage, Arizona, U.S., a city
- Mirage, Kansas, U.S.
- Mirage Township, Kearney County, Nebraska, U.S.
- The Mirage Tavern, a bar purchased by the Chicago Sun-Times to document corrupt officials

== People ==
- Mirage (drag queen), American drag performer
- Briana Banks or Mirage (born 1979), German-born pornographic actress and model
- Marianne Mirage (born 1989), Italian singer-songwriter

== Books and magazines ==
- Mirage Publishing, a British publisher of true-crime books
- Mirage Studios, an American comic book company
- Mirage, a 2000 novel in the New Isaac Asimov's Robot Mystery series by Mark W. Tiedemann, based in Asimov's Robot universe
- Mirage, a 1987 novel by Louise Cooper
- Mirage, a 1988 novel by James Follett
- Mirage, a 1956 novel by Ruth McKenney
- Mirage, a 1996 novel by F. Paul Wilson with Matthew J. Costello
- Mirage, a 2013 novel by Clive Cussler
- The Mirage (Mahfouz novel), 1948, by Naguib Mahfouz
- The Mirage (Ruff novel), 2012, by Matt Ruff
- Mirages: The Unexpurgated Diary of Anaïs Nin, 1939-1947, a 2013 book
- Mirage (magazine), an international fashion and culture magazine
- The Mirage (Al-Suwaidi book), a 2015 nonfiction book by Jamal Sanad Al-Suwaidi

== Film, television, and stage ==
- The Mirage (play), a 1920 play by Edgar Selwyn
- Mirages (1915 film), a Russian short film directed by Pyotr Chardynin
- The Mirage (1920 film), a British silent romance directed by Arthur Rooke
- The Mirage (1924 film), an American silent comedy film
- Mirages (1938 film), a French drama film directed by Alexandre Ryder
- Mirage (1965 film), a thriller film starring Gregory Peck
- Mirage (1972 film) (Espejismo), a Peruvian drama film directed by Armando Robles Godoy
- The Mirage, 1980 Moroccan film by Ahmed Bouanani
- Mirage (1995 film), a thriller film starring Sean Young
- Mirage (2004 film) (Iluzija), a Macedonian film
- Mirage (2014 film), a Hungarian-Slovak film
- The Mirage (2015 film), a Canadian comedy-drama film
- Mirage (2018 film), a Spanish thriller romance film directed by Oriol Paulo
- Mirage (2025 film), an Indian thriller film by Jeethu Joseph
- The Mirage, Egyptian film based on 1948 novel by Naguib Mahfouz
- "Mirage" (Alias), an episode of Alias
- Susie "Mirage" Young, a character from COPS (animated TV series)

== Comics and video games ==
=== Characters ===
- Mirage (Aladdin), from the Disney animated series Aladdin
- Mirage (G.I. Joe), a character in the G.I. Joe universe
- Mirage (The Incredibles), from the film The Incredibles
- Mirage (Transformers), several characters in the various Transformers universes
- Mirage (comics), a set-index article listing several uses, including:
  - Danielle Moonstar or Mirage, an X-Men comics superheroine
  - Mirage (DC Comics), two characters: a Batman minor supervillain and a Teen Titan superheroine
  - Mirage (Marvel Comics), a Spider-Man supervillain
  - Mirage Studios, an American comic book company
- Mirage, from the animated series COPS
- Mirage Koas, from the video game Star Ocean: Till the End of Time
- Mirage Farina Jenius, from the anime series Macross Delta
- Mirage, from the video game Apex Legends

=== Other uses in comics and video games ===
- Mirage (video game), a 1995 game for Windows 3.1
- Mirage: Arcane Warfare, a 2017 video game for Windows
- Mirage (Counter-Strike), a multiplayer map for the Counter-Strike series of shooters
- Mirage Technologies (Multimedia) Ltd., a British video game developer
- Assassin's Creed Mirage, a 2023 video game by Ubisoft

== Brands and software ==
- Mirage Toys, a company that produces action figures, including characters in South Park
- Mirage (chocolate bar), a chocolate bar made by Nestlé Canada
- Mirage (Magic: The Gathering), a collectible card game block
- Quantel Mirage, a digital real-time video effects processor
- Ensoniq Mirage, a sampler made by Ensoniq
- Minimum Information Required About a Glycomics Experiment, a set of guidelines for reporting biological experiments and facilitate automated processing

== Companies ==
- Mirage Aircraft Corporation, an American aircraft manufacturer

== Vehicles ==
- Dassault Mirage, a series of military jets produced by Dassault Aviation
- Malibu Mirage, a variant of the Piper PA-46 aircraft
- Ultralight Flight Mirage, an ultralight aircraft
- Mirage (race car), a series of sports racing and racing cars
- Mitsubishi Mirage, a subcompact car
- Mirage, a class of Russian Navy patrol boats

== Music ==
=== Performers ===
- Mirage, a 1990s British progressive rock band formed by Camel members Peter Bardens and Andy Ward
- Mirage (metal band), a 1980s British heavy metal band
- Mirage (Russian band), a 1980s Russian pop group
- Mirage (medley group), a project of British record producer Nigel Wright, best known for the Jack Mix series of medleys/mash-ups
- The Mirage (band), a late-1960s British pop group

=== Albums ===
- Mirage (Armin van Buuren album), 2010
- Mirage (Art Blakey album), 1957
- Mirage (Art Farmer album), 1982
- Mirage (Bobby Hutcherson album), 1991
- Mirage (Camel album), 1974
- Mirage (Digitalism album), 2016
- Mirage (Eric Burdon album), 2008
- Mirage (Fleetwood Mac album), 1982
- Mirage (Iris album), 1998
- Mirage (Jagjit Singh album), 1995
- Mirage (Klaus Schulze album), 1977
- Mirage (Meat Puppets album), 1987
- Mirage (Mell album), 2010
- Mirages (Tim Hecker album), 2004
- Mirages, by Sabine Devieilhe, 2017

=== EPs ===
- Mirage (T-ara EP), a repackaged version of Day by Day, 2012
- Mirage, by Glass Beams, 2021
- Mirage, by Plini, 2023
- Mirage, by Scarlet Pleasure, 2014

=== Songs ===
- "Mirage" (Creepy Nuts song), 2025
- "Mirage" (M. Pokora song), 2010
- "Mirage" (OneRepublic song), 2023
- "Mirage" (Scotch song), 1986
- "Mirage" (MPH and Skrillex song), 2026
- "Mirage" (Tommy James and the Shondells song), 1967
- "Mirage", by Alexandra Savior from Belladonna of Sadness, 2017
- "Mirage", by Band-Maid from Conqueror, 2019
- "Mirage", by Brymo from Klĭtôrĭs, 2016
- "Mirage", by Chris Brown from Fortune, 2012
- "Mirage", by Doro from Doro, 1990
- "Mirage", by Jean-Luc Ponty from Enigmatic Ocean, 1977
- "Mirage", by Ladytron from Gravity the Seducer, 2011
- "Mirage", by M83 from DSVII, 2019
- "Mirage", by MiSaMo from Haute Couture, 2024
- "Mirage", by Moroccan Blonde from the soundtrack of the film It's All Gone Pete Tong, 2004
- "Mirage", by Oh Hiroshima from In Silence We Yearn, 2015
- "Mirage", by Ricki-Lee Coulter from Dance in the Rain, 2014
- "Mirage", by Sabrina Carpenter from Evolution, 2016
- "Mirage", by Santana from Borboletta, 1974
- "Mirage", by Siouxsie and the Banshees from The Scream, 1978
- "Mirage", by Soolking featuring Khaled, 2018
- "Mirage", by Takanashi Kiara, 2024
- Mirages (Fauré), a song cycle by Gabriel Fauré, 1919

=== Other uses in music ===
- Mirage Music, an American record company co-founded by Jerry L. Greenberg
