= David August (musician) =

German electronic musician, producer, and composer (born 1990)

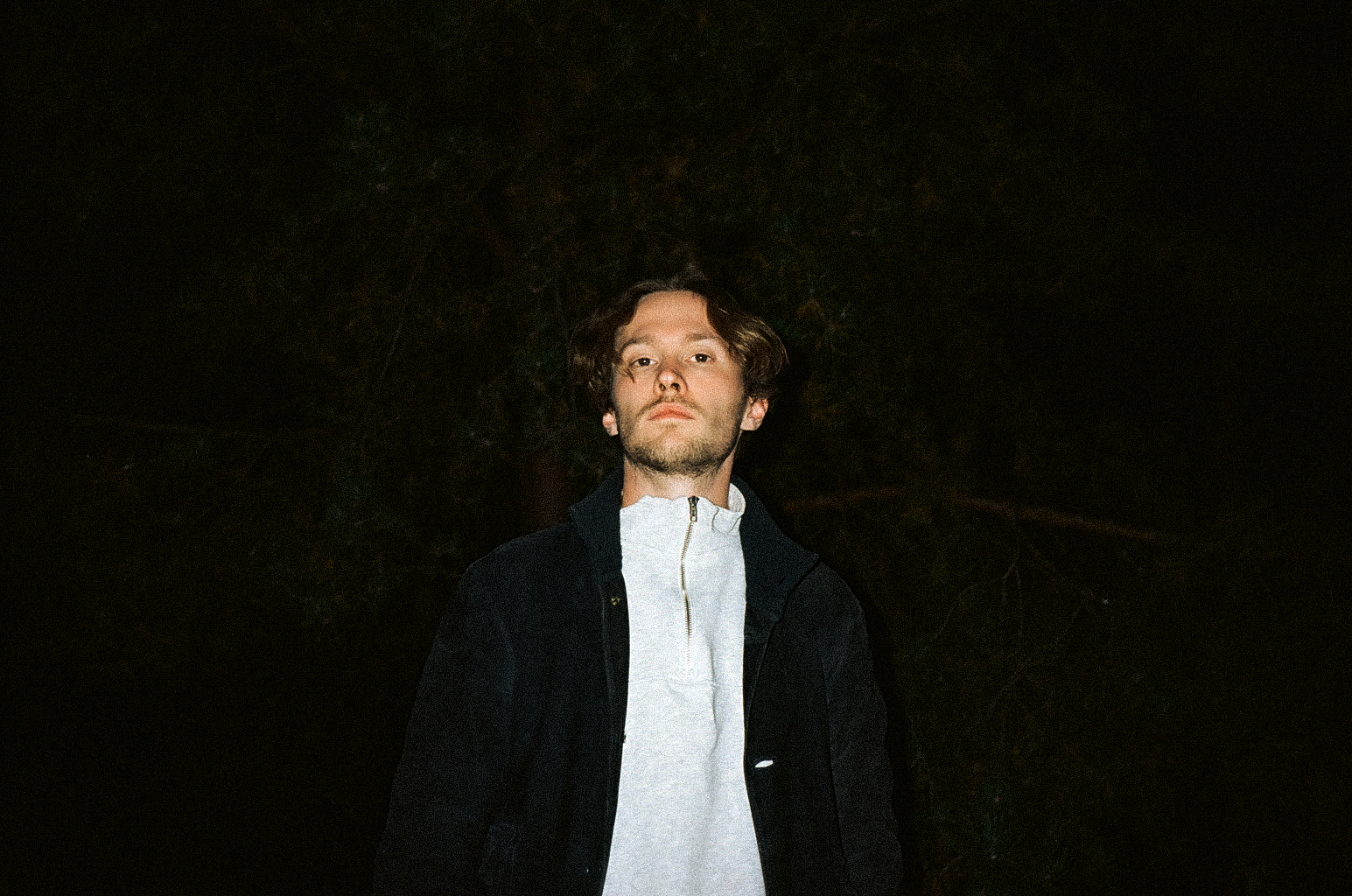

Background information
- Also known as: David August
- Born: David Nattkemper; July 7, 1990 (age 36); Hamburg, Germany
- Origin: Hamburg, Germany; Palestrina, Italy
- Genres: Electronic; ambient; experimental
- Occupations: composer, DJ, producer, mixing engineer, pianist, label owner
- Years active: 2006–present
- Labels: 99CHANTS; PIAS; !K7; Counter Records; Innervisions
- Website: davidxaugust.com

David Nattkemper (born 7 July 1990), professionally known as David August, is an Italo-German composer, producer, mixing engineer, DJ and classically trained pianist and a graduate from Universität der Künste.

August released 4 studio albums and multiple EPs since 2010.

In 2018, the release of the cinematic album DCXXXIX A.C. marked the debut of his newly founded record label 99Chants, followed by D'Angelo in the same year which was released on PIAS.

August has collaborated with Deutsches Symphonie Orchester Berlin, with the Coro Polifonico Cittá Del Palestrina, as well as with other musicians, including Cansu Tanrikulu, Sushma Soma, Anastasia Markopoulou among others. He is the son of German pianist Ralf Nattkemper.

== Early life ==
August was born in Hamburg, Germany. His first approach to music happened at age 5 through the piano, focussing on classical repertoire. His first teacher was Gisela Stumme, taught by Conrad Hansen. Subsequent teachers were Marian Migdal from 2009 to 2011 and Rolf Koenen from 2013 to 2017. At age 10, August started programming his first compositions in notation software as well as composing pieces on guitar.

== Career ==
=== 2006–2014 ===
In 2006, August was introduced to dance music through a friend from school, with whom he shared first DJ experiences and eventually also made his first music productions. From 2008 through 2014 his music production was predominantly club-oriented, inspired by the local Hamburg scene and its most prominent artists.

In 2009 August became resident at Hamburg's club EGO. The residency at the 300-capacity space devoted to a wide range of monthly programming marked a pathbreaking period for August's early career. Shortly after in 2010, August released his Instant Harmony EP, consisting in a theatrical and melodic approach to the club scene. Several EPs followed as well as remixes, official and unofficial works.

In 2013 David August released his first album Times, a first exploration in electronic songwriting with acoustic and electronic instrumentation and a detachment from playing traditional DJ gigs in favour of developing a new language. With Times, David adopted a different approach to shows, presenting for the first time his own music in a club environment with a live set. It is during these more explorative years that he landed numerous official remixes for the likes of Max Cooper (2014), Stimming (2014), Kollektiv Turmstrasse (2014) and The Acid (2015) In 2014 he released Epikur, his debut EP on the Berlin label Innervisions.

His debut for Boiler Room, a showcase of unofficial works that remains a signature of David's live performances and a significant turning point in August's career was broadcast in 2014. Several appearances in annual polls followed with "4th-best live act of the year in the Resident Advisor annual poll" among them

=== 2015–2017 ===
In 2015 August continued exploring with Resident Advisor session's live set, during which he built an improvised piece based on an interview of Alfred Hitchcock and his "Definition Of Happiness". In the same year an encounter with Berlin-based Greek vocalist and harpist Sissi Rada would happen and the collaboration on the song Patria was released. Sissi Rada became part of a new live project "David August & Ensemble" together with Max Trieder on guitar and Marcel Braun on drums in the same year. A European tour followed with appearances at Volksbühne, Melkweg, Le Divan du Monde and others.

In August 2016, debuts a collaborative project and broadcast live performance X-Poème Symphonique with the Deutsches Symphonie Orchester Berlin, a 50-piece classical symphonic orchestra. It was one of August's first steps towards a dialogue between classical and electronic music. David met Mark Wyand who played the saxophone within the orchestra, who eventually becomes a collaborator for other live performances at Elbphilharmonie and studio recordings The Life of Merisi and Dorian Space

In the same month, released two EPs: J.B.Y./Ouvert and The Spell, on Ninja Tunes' sub-label Counter Records, marking a new dedication to sound design and different rhythmical structures. A live summer tour across the European continent followed to promote these two EPs, including a live session for Red Bull Music Academy's showcase series See.Hear.Now. where he performed live versions of his Counter catalogue.

After this tour, August took a break from performing to focus on graduating from university.

=== 2018–2020 ===
In March 2018 August released his second album DCXXXIX A.C. accompanied by an hour-long video filmed by August in Palestrina, birth-place of his mother.

Launching his own record label 99Chants, DCXXXIX A.C. marks a turning point in aesthetic and concept. Ambient and drone in its core, August explores the visual and sonic work while aiming for a three-dimensional form of expression. In an interview with XLR8R he says: "The piece is 60 min long and contains 24 tracks, which I see all linked together, forming one long breath. As my most recent work takes inspiration from my Italian provenience, so does this album. I go back in time, finding myself surrounded by the nature and ancient spirit of a small town in the middle of Italy – vision and sound to a time and space unknown".

In September 2018 August performed a sold-out show at Elbphilharmonie, in his native city of Hamburg. In October of the same year, August released his third album D'Angelo, on PIAS. The writing sessions began in Florence in 2016, and were concluded in Berlin two years later. August cooperates with the Coro Polifonico Città del Palestrina, whose featured on every track of the album As with his predecessor DCXXXIX A.C., D'Angelo is dedicated to August's provenience, inspired by Italian artists throughout the centuries. Baroque painter Caravaggio and renaissance composer Giovanni Pierluigi da Palestrina are the most significant inspirations. August also mentions Fellini, Dante, Battisti and De André as inspirations.

Showcasing a variety of musical directions, from post-rock, ambient and club influences, the album connects throughout a continuous cinematic aesthetic and experimental songwriting. Ascetic House affiliate JS Aurelius contributes the design and packaging of the record as previously on DCXXXIX A.C. To promote the album, August embarked on an 85-date world tour. Gigi Masin, Paquita Gordon, Louis Sterling and Neonlichter were supporting the tour in Europe and the United States.

In summer 2019 August broadcast The Life of Merisi, a cooperation with Argentinian artist and painter Francisco Bosoletti. August deconstructed the material of D'Angelo and presented unreleased works.

In early 2020, August released Reminiscence Of A Jewel, the sixth "chant" on his imprint 99Chants.

In September 2020, 99Chants released Bunita Marcus' 1985 composition Lecture for Jo Kondo. The original composition is accompanied by 20-minute long recomposition by August, characterised by a process of "deconstruction" rooted in experimental sound-design and modern counterpoint, divided into 5 chapters. It is also August's first attempt to accompany his music with a visual score.

=== 2021–2023 ===
In 2021 August curated a 12-month residency at Palestinian based Radio Alhara inviting guests such as Suzanne Ciani, Donato Dozzy, KMRU, SSIEGE, Marta de Pascalis and more.

In 2022 August was involved in the release of Aurōra through his label, a solar panel instrument and design object for modular synthesizers. Later in 2022, he released non-profit compilation Imaginary Landscapes with music by KMRU, Yu Su, Karem Lotfy, and others, donating all the proceeds to help restoring mangroves in India. August contributed with two collaborative side-projects, Aşa (with jazz-noise vocalist Cansu Tanrikulu) and Madrā (with Carnatic vocalist Sushma Soma). He is intrigued about necessary utopias and the social impact of sound.

In 2023 August released his 4th studio album VĪS. According to its press release, the album "is the result of a lengthy process of self-discovery, collaboration and research". The album features an imaginary alphabet, made in collaboration with Moroccan graphic designer Hiba Baddou. The packaging was designed by Saeed Abu-Jaber and Mothanna Hussein at Turrbo, a Amman-based graphic design studio.

For a concert tour, August translated VĪS to a stage setting. Supported by visuals by Marcel Weber/MFO and choreography by Franka Marlene Foth. August is joined on stage by 2 dancers and percussionist Andrea Belfi. The concert tour spanned multiple dates across Europe, including Barbican Centre, Le Trianon and Bozar.

== Discography ==
=== LPs ===
- 2013: Times
- 2018: DCXXXIX A.C.
- 2018: D'Angelo
- 2023: VĪS
- 2024: VĪS Reinterpretations

=== Broadcast ===
- 2014: Boiler Room DJ Set
- 2015: RA Session
- 2016: X - Poème Symphonique with the Deutsches Symphonie Orchester Berlin
- 2019: The Life of Merisi at Melt! Festival

=== Selected Singles & EPs ===
- 2010: Instant Harmony EP
- 2014: Epikur EP
- 2014: Diynamic Revisited EP
- 2015: Patria feat. Sissi Rada
- 2016: J.B.Y./Ouvert EP
- 2016: The Spell/A Golden Rush EP
- 2020: Reminiscence of a Jewel
- 2024: Workouts EP

=== Mixes ===
- 2014: Innervisions #50
- 2017: NTS Radio
- 2019: No Fun Radio w/Neonlichter
- 2019: The Lot Radio
- 2019: Worldwide FM
- 2020: Tomorrow Is Forever I
- 2020: Tomorrow Is Forever II
- 2020: Tomorrow Is Forever III
- 2021: Tomorrow Is Forever x Radio Alhara
- 2022: Refuge Worldwide
- 2023: NTS Radio VĪS Special
- 2024: Aeyde Radio
- 2024: Crack Magazine
- 2024: The Lot Radio
- 2025: Rough Radio Roma
- 2025: NTS Radio

=== Selected remixes & edits ===
- 2013: Rebekah Del Rio – "Llorando" (David August Remix) – Unofficial
- 2013: Grizzly Bear – "Yet Again" (David August Reconstruction) – Unofficial
- 2013: Syl Johnson – "Is It Because I am Black" (David August Edit) – Unofficial
- 2014: Kollektiv Turmstrasse – "Last Day" (David August Revision)
- 2014: Stimming – "Der Schmelz" (David August Revision)
- 2014: Max Cooper – "Origins" (David August Remix)
- 2015: The Acid – "RA" (David August Remix)
- 2016: Hamlet Gonashvili – "Orovela" (David August Edit) – Unofficial
- 2016: Nina Simone – "Black Is the Color of My True Love's Hair" (David August Edit) – Unofficial
- 2016: Ashford & Simpson – "Don't Cost You Nothing" (David August Edit) – Unofficial
- 2017: Leonard Cohen – "You Want It Darker" (David August Remix)
- 2018: Pino Daniele – "My Way" (David August Remix) – Unofficial
- 2018: Giovanni Pierluigi da Palestrina - "Missa Papae Marcelli" (David August Reconstruction) – Unofficial
- 2018: Frescobaldi – "Toccata Seconda" (David August Deconstruction) – Unofficial
- 2019: Pino Daniele – "I Know My Way" (David August Edit) — Unofficial
- 2020: Bunita Marcus – "Lecture for Jo Kondo" (David August Deconstruction)
