= Sian (musician) =

Graham Goodwin
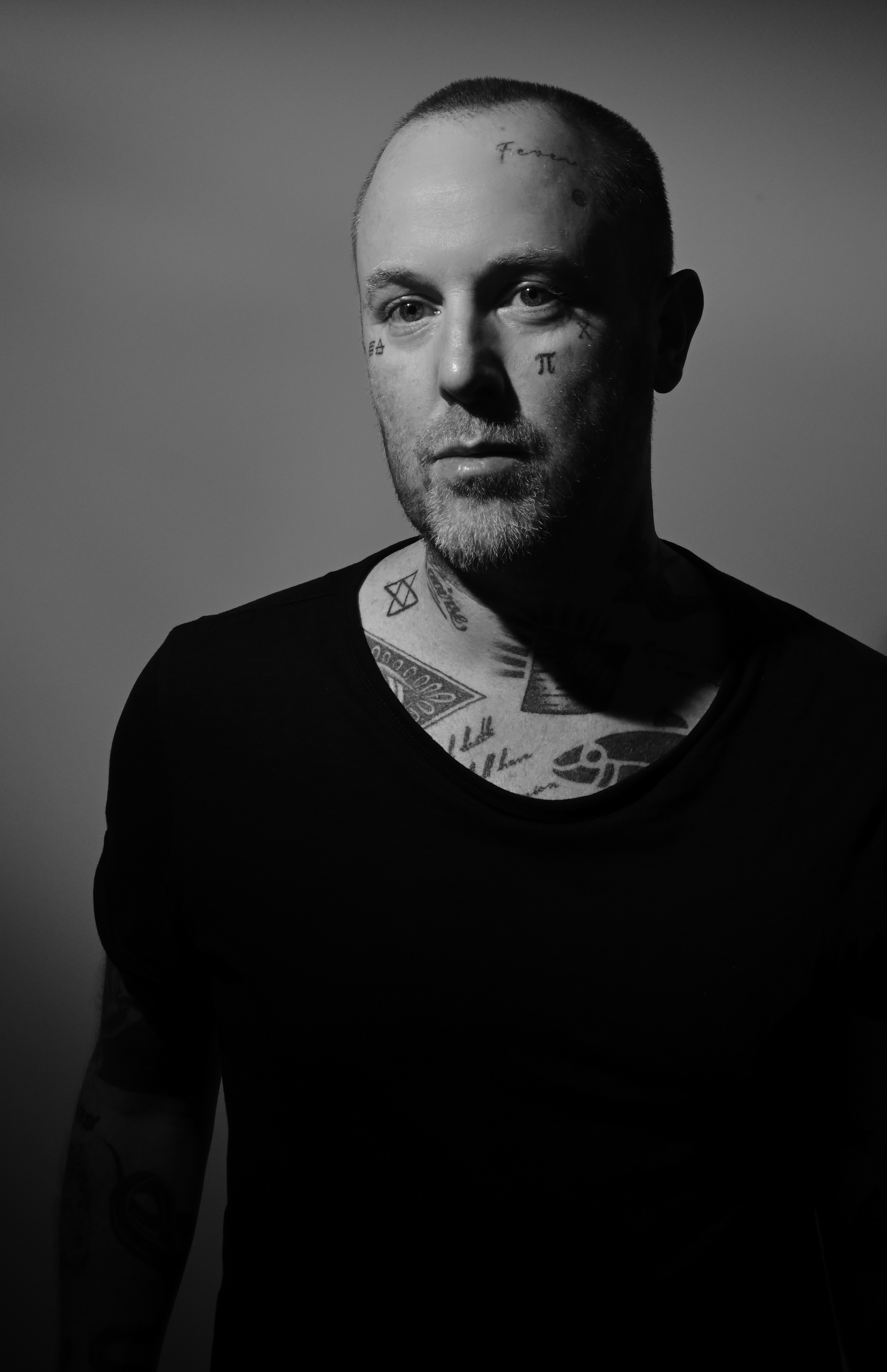

Background information
- Also known as: Sian
- Born: Graham Anthony Goodwin; 22 October 1977 (age 49); Dublin, Republic of Ireland
- Origin: Ireland and Spain
- Genres: Techno, Melodic techno, dark disco
- Occupations: Musician, DJ, Label owner
- Years active: 2005–present
- Label: Octopus Recordings
- Website: https://www.djsian.com/

Graham Anthony Goodwin (born 22 October 1977), also known as Sian, is an Irish electronic dance music producer, DJ, visual artist, and record label owner. He founded Octopus Recordings label in 2008. He has released records on Diynamic, Cocoon Recordings, and Drumcode Records music labels, and produced remixes for Jan Blomqvist, Oliver Heldens, and Deadmau5, among others. Goodwin hosts a show on his label’s Octopus Radio, appears on BBC Northern Ireland radio, the SiriusXM BPM station, and has been featured on Apple Music.

== Biography and career ==
Born in Dublin, Ireland, Goodwin was raised in Spain. He currently resides in Los Angeles. His musical career began when he was a teenager, playing in Dublin's now-closed club, The Kitchen and in Barcelona's Razzmatazz club. Sian's releases have been charted by Beatport over 100 times, with 8 tracks appearing on the site's Overall Top 100 Tracks chart. He has also had two charted tracks on Spotify.

Founded in 2008, Goodwin’s music label outputs a range of electronic music genres, from Melodic Techno to Indie Dance. Octopus Recordings has released work by notable artists including Nicole Moudaber, HI-LO, Julian Jeweil, Sam Paganini, Reiner Zonneveld, Oliver Koletzki, among others. The label's releases have appeared in the top 10 techno chart on Beatport. Nicole Moudaber's 2012 remix of Sian's "Front Pocket" reached the number one position on the Beatport techno charts. In 2016, Beatport featured Goodwin as their Artist of the Week.

In 2017, Goodwin collaborated with skateboarder Aaron Homoki to create a line of merchandise. Goodwin has also released albums on Deadmau5's label, Mau5trap, including his "Ultraviolet" EP series.

In 2023, Armin van Buuren's Armada Music released Sian's "La Petite Mort" with Burko and Autograf.

== Third Culture ==
In 2023, Goodwin collaborated with Sacha Robotti on a project called Third Culture, releasing two EPs on Solomun's record label, Diynamic. Solomun also invited Third Culture to perform alongside him at Exposition Park (Los Angeles). Maceo Plex's Lone Romantic label also releases Third Culture's work, and BBC Radio 1's Pete Tong is a notable supporter. Third Culture's early releases earned chart-topping spots on Beatport's electro (Classic / Detroit / Modern) charts.

== Touring ==
Goodwin has performed at popular music events, including Amsterdam Dance Event, Barcelona's Sónar music festival, Detroit Electronic Music Festival “Movement”, Art Brasil, Electric Daisy Carnival Las Vegas and Orlando, Brooklyn's Avant Gardner, Miami Music Week, and Governors Island. He has also supported Deadmau5 on tour in 2019.

== Discography ==
=== On Octopus Recordings ===
Year	Title
2017	Pause
2015	Front Pocket (Nicole Moudaber remix)
2013	Sleeper Cell
2013	Shame Cube
2011	Purple Bang

=== Albums ===
Year	Title
2020	X
2017	Ultraviolet EP
2017	Capital Crimewave
2015	Anthracite
2011	Before Silence

=== Releases ===
Singles and EPs

2023	La Petite Mort (with Burko and Autograf)	Armada Music
2023	Chemicals EP	Diynamic
2023	Never Look Back EP	Diynamic

=== Early Releases ===
Singles and EPs

2007	Flood EP (with Gui Boratto remix)	Octopus Recordings
2006	Cinematheque	Dessous
2005	Sei	Pokerflat Recordings

=== Remixes ===
Sian has produced remixes for Jan Blomqvist, Deadmau5, HI-LO, and others.
