= HOSH =

German DJ & producer (born 1986)

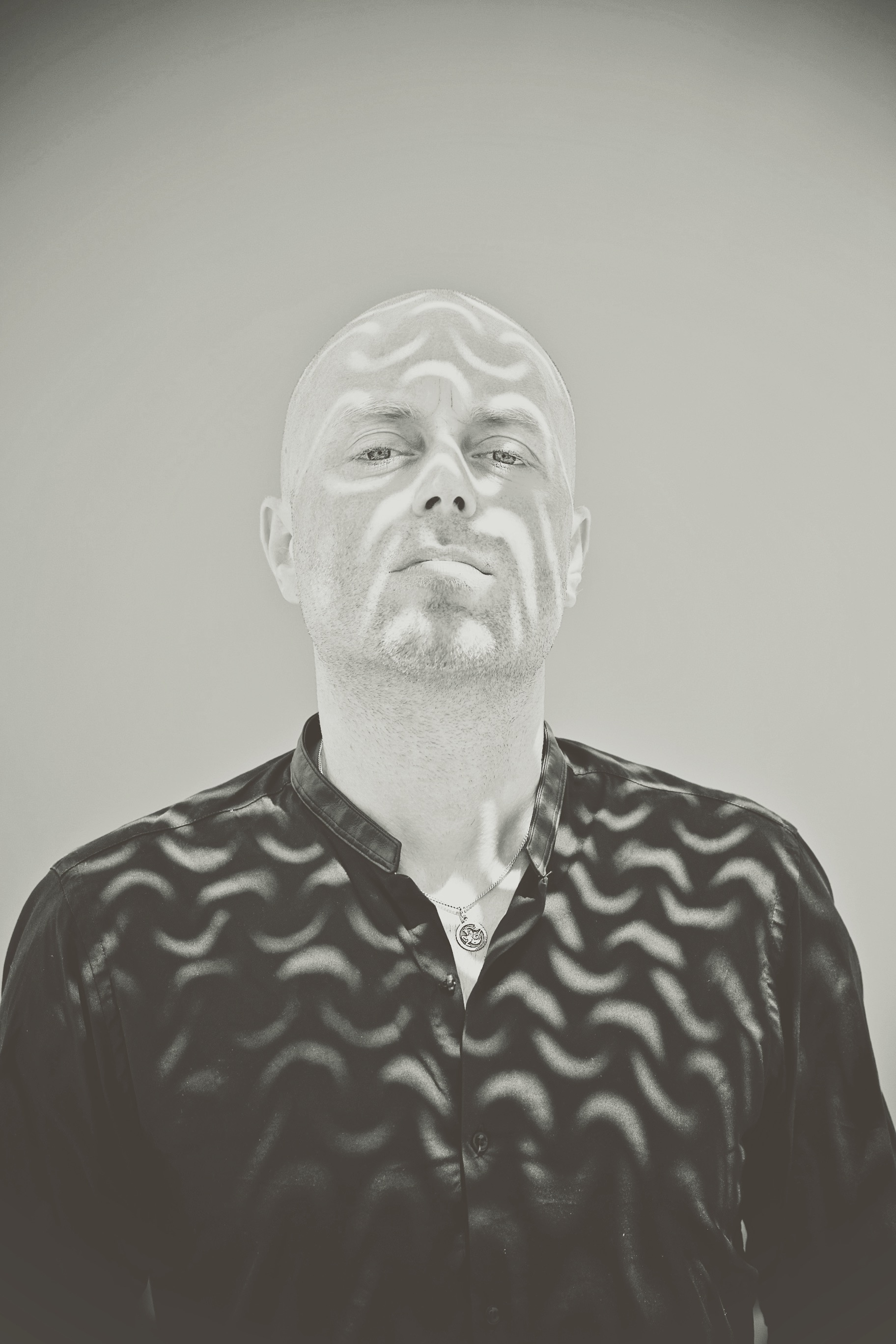

Background information
- Also known as: H.O.S.H.
- Born: Holger Behn; 1986 (age 39–40); Hamburg, West Germany
- Genres: Deep house, electronica, techno
- Occupations: DJ, producer
- Years active: 2004 – present
- Labels: fryhide, Diynamic

HOSH (born as Holger Behn; 1986 in Hamburg, West Germany) is a German DJ and producer. He is an employee of Diynamic and the founder of The Fryhide Imprint (or, in German, 'Freiheit').

== Career ==
HOSH was born in 1986, Hamburg. He became interested in producing because he had interest in how the records he was playing were put together. H.O.S.H states, "When it comes to producing, making music for me is like cooking – the meal/track gets better the more love you put in." H.O.S.H was the first member of Diynamic, releasing successful records such as Oelckersallee EP & White Elephant. Following releases and remixes for imprints like Kindisch, Get Physical, Stil Vor Talent, Supernature, Freerange, Strictly Rhythm, Dessous, Tsuba, and more. Being an important employee of the Diynamic crew, H.O.S.H released his album in 2010 on Diynamic, Connecting the Dots, an album made up of ten dance floor cuts that all exhibit a trademark Diynamic musicality, hint at H.O.S.H influences up to this point and simultaneously mark out a path into the future of underground house music.

In the year 2013, H.O.S.H presented a special on Diynamic consisting of four releases and eight tracks titled 'Forever Young.' H.O.S.H stated, "We all had dreams when we were young, and it's never too late to live them. This special series encapsulates that sentiment." Making highlights again, H.O.S.H stepped up for the official remix of Sono's 'Keep Control' released in 2013 on Kontor Music. The release was a staple in Beatports top 100. H.O.S.H then ended his Diynamic journey with his latest release 'Karma EP' in 2017, becoming the #1 track in Beatport techno charts in 2017. During the summer of 2016, H.O.S.H was invited by Heart Ibiza to host five exclusive dates with ROULETTE "Heart is a place on the island that really wants to be groundbreaking and always looks for fresh concepts—I feel our ROULETTE idea has found the perfect home", HOSH tells DJ Mag Ibiza. "If you come to one of our five events this year, you will find something that you don't find at any other party on the island!"

H.O.S.H established his own imprint, Fryhide, which was initiated with the Stories from Sa Talaia album, creating a mix that H.O.S.H then donated to listeners. He then released the tracks through 4 EPs on Fryhide, featuring collaborations with GHEIST, Tim Engelhardt, Lehar, Pig&Dan, Karmon, Mia Lee, Sono, Musumeci, and Johannes Brecht. Fryhide has seen great success releasing music from artists such as Artbat, Tone Depth, Groj, 1979, and more, becoming one of the best-selling labels and holding high chart positions in Beatport's top 100 all genres and Melodic House & Techno. Moving forward, H.O.S.H has taken Fryhide to his fans through showcases in Montreal, Basel, Berlin, Amsterdam, Hamburg, and Barcelona. In 2018, H.O.S.H was nominated for the Melodic House & Techno DJ Awards alongside many of his peers and friends.

=== Midnight ("The Hanging Tree") ===
In 2019, H.O.S.H teamed up with Italian artist 1979 (a.k.a. Venetian-born, Amsterdam-based producer Giovanni Salviato) on a dance version of James Newton Howard's Hunger Games's song "The Hanging Tree". Now titled "Midnight (The Hanging Tree)" and featuring singer Jalja, the song reached #1 on the Melodic House and Techno Tracks playlist after being released exclusively on Beatport in December 2019. In 2020, the record was signed to Mark Gillespie and Pete Tong's Three Six Zero Recordings, with the UK release being promoted by Sony's Ministry of Sound records label. The track was then picked up by BBC Radio 1's Annie Mac as 'The Week's Hottest Record' and was also Pete Tong's Essential New Tune, the first of the decade. After a couple of months on the bottom of the Official Singles Chart Top 100, the song finally entered the Top 40 on 26 June 2020 at Number 34.

The song additionally achieved prominence after Péter Magyar's victory at the 2026 Hungarian Parliamentary Election, where a clip of Magyar's Health Minister nominee, Zsolt Hegedűs dancing to the song after the victory speech by Magyar went viral. On May 9, 2026, H.O.S.H. and Jalja appeared as surprise guests at the celebration following Magyar and his government's inauguration ceremony, at Kossuth Square in front of the Hungarian Parliament building, where they performed "Midnight (The Hanging Tree)", with Hegedűs and his fellow politicians dancing to it.

=== Becky Hill and Sigala – "Heaven on My Mind" (HOSH Remix) ===
Released in August 2020, HOSH has been recruited by UK pop-dance-rising Becky Hill and Sigala to remix their summer single.

== Discography ==
=== Albums ===
- 2010: Connecting.The.Dots (Diynamic)

=== Extended plays and singles ===
- 2006: "Süßstoff" (Stil Vor Talent)
- 2006: Solomun and HOSH – Oelkersallee EP (Diynamic)
- 2007: Solomun / HOSH – Mischwaren EP (Diynamic)
- 2007: Themes, Rhythms & Harmonies / Jazzkantine (Diynamic)
- 2007: "Grünanlage" (Stil Vor Talent)
- 2007: "White Elephant" (Kindisch)
- 2008: Under a Fig Tree EP (Diynamic)
- 2008: Stimming / HOSH / Solomun – Trilogy EP (Diynamic)
- 2008: Remix Session 01 (Diynamic)
- 2009: Better & Sweet EP (Diynamic)
- 2010: Cash the Chord EP (Diynamic)
- 2011: The Remix Sessions 07 (Diynamic)
- 2011: "Tour De Fonque" (Leena Music)
- 2012: Ego EP (Poker Flat Recordings)
- 2012: Neon EP (Diynamic)
- 2012: Life Is Music Is Life EP (Diynamic)
- 2012: HOSH & HearThug – "Technicolour" (Stranjjur)
- 2013: HOSH Presents Forever Young 2 (Diynamic)
- 2013: HOSH Presents Forever Young (10 INCH) (Diynamic)
- 2013: HOSH Presents Forever Young 3 (Diynamic)
- 2014: Forever Young 4 (Diynamic)
- 2015: Cilantrophy EP (Diynamic)
- 2016: "Lunchtime" (Bedrock Records)
- 2017: Karma EP (Diynamic)
- 2017: Stories from Sa Talaia – fryhide
- 2018: On the radar – fryhide
- 2018: Blinded – fryhide
- 2018: Jedi – fryhide
- 2018: Unconventional Ride – fryhide
- 2018: Express / Airwolf – fryhide
- 2019: Solstice – fryhide
- 2019: Midnight – fryhide
- 2020: Tighter featuring Jalja

=== Remixes ===
- 2007 Dizko Toaster – Toast Hawaii (H.O.S.H. Remix) – Stil Vor Talent
- 2007 Smith and Burns – Come On Digital (H.O.S.H. Remix) – Deepdub Recordings
- 2007 Catorze – Lusco fusco (H.O.S.H. Remix) – Bloop Recordings
- 2008 Koletzki – Music from the heart (H.O.S.H. Remix) – Stil vor Talent
- 2008 Lucy – Downstairs (H.O.S.H. Remix) – Meerestief
- 2008 Sweno N – Lore – Ziodoor (H.O.S.H. Remix) – Parquet
- 2008 Daso – Bummelzug (H.O.S.H. Remix) – Flash
- 2008 Milton Jackson – Ghosts (H.O.S.H. Remix) – Freerange
- 2008 Nicone – Una Rosa (H.O.S.H. Remix) – Stil vor Talent
- 2009 Lucy – Downstairs (H.O.S.H. Remix) – Meerestief Digital
- 2009 Milton Jackson – Ghosts In My Machine (H.O.S.H. Remix) – Freerange
- 2009 Sole Fusion – Bass Tone (H.O.S.H. Remix) – Strictly Rhythm
- 2010 Alex Moments and Matt Brown – Odette (H.O.S.H. Remix) – Supernature
- 2010 Trickski – Pill Collins (H.O.S.H. Remix) – Suol
- 2011 Gorge – Makena (H.O.S.H. Remix) – 8bit Records
- 2011 Audiojack – No Rest For The Wicked (H.O.S.H. Remix) – Gruuv
- 2011 Moonbeam – No Regrets (H.O.S.H. Remix) – Neurotraxx Deluxe
- 2011 Adultnapper – Idiot Fair (H.O.S.H. Remix) – Pokerflat
- 2012 Rivera Rotation – Singing Our Song (H.O.S.H. Remix) – Lounge Records
- 2013 HNQO featuring BR – We Do It (H.O.S.H. Remix) – Playperview
- 2013 Sono – Keep Control (H.O.S.H. Remix) – Kontor Records
- 2013 Marlon Hoffstadt and HRRSN – Skin And Bone (H.O.S.H. Remix) – Stil vor Talent
- 2013 Riva Star featuring Rssll – Detox Blues (H.O.S.H. Remix) – Snatch! Records
- 2015 ABBY – Halo (H.O.S.H.'s Boy Remix) – 2DIY4
- 2015 ABBY – Halo (H.O.S.H.’s Night Remix) – 2DIY4
- 2015 Kaiserdisco – Jet Stream (H.O.S.H. Remix) – KD RAW
- 2015 Kaiserdisco – Jet Stream (H.O.S.H.’s Melodrama Mix) – KD RAW
- 2015 Of The Moon – Of The Moon (feat. Bartlee) (H.O.S.H. Remix) – Audiotonic Records
- 2016 Andre Winter, D-SAW – Track 10:30 (H.O.S.H. Remix) – Capital Heaven
- 2016 RÜFÜS – Innerbloom (H.O.S.H. Remix) – Sweat It Out!
- 2017 Simon Berry, Luke Brancaccio – Oblivion (HOSH Remix) – Bedrock Records
- 2018 Desert Sound Colony – Sunrise Of My Mind (HOSH Remix) – Fayer
- 2018 Groj – The Crossing (HOSH Remix) – fryhide
- 2018 Hernan Cattaneo, Lonya – Confession EP (HOSH & Tone Depth Remix) – Warung Recordings
- 2018 Tone Depth, Fetsum, Johannes Brecht – Free (HOSH Edit) – Diyanamic Music
- 2019 Poe – Through Glass (HOSH edit) – fryhide
- 2019 Simao – The Chase (HOSH edit) – fryhide
- 2019 Joplyn – Money Machine (HOSH remix) – Stone Free Berlin
- 2019 Crooked Colours – I C Light (HOSH remix) – fryhide
- 2020: Boss Doms – I Want More (feat. Kyle Pearce) [HOSH remix] – Warner Music Italy
- 2020: Becky Hill and Sigala – Heaven On My Mind (HOSH Remix) – Universal
