= Plagemann =

Plagemann is a surname. Notable people with the surname include:

- Augusta Plagemann (1799–1888), Swedish artist
- Jürgen Plagemann (1936–2026), German rower
- Nico Plagemann, half of German musical duo Kollektiv Turmstraße
- Stephen Plagemann, co-author of The Jupiter Effect
