= Fadi Kattan =

Palestinian chef

- Born: c. 1977; Bethlehem, Palestine
- Culinary career
- Current restaurants
- Fawda, Bethlehem (2016–present); Akub, London (2022–present); Louf, Toronto (2025–present)
- Website: www.fadikattan.com

Fadi Kattan (born 1977 or 1978) is a Palestinian chef, hotelier, and cookbook author. His debut book Bethlehem: A Celebration of Palestinian Food (2024) won a Guild of Food Writers (GFW) Award.

== Early life ==
Kattan was born to "one of the oldest Christian families in Bethlehem", with records dating back to at least 1738. His maternal grandmother Julia Dabdoub founded the local Arab Women's Union in 1947 and spoke five languages, while his grandfather Michel Dabdoub, a doctor raised in France, would take Kattan to Paris. On the other side, his Bombay-born father's family were well traveled around India, Japan and Sudan. Prior to the Nakba, the family had 120 dunams (100 acres) of orange groves in Jaffa that were confiscated "overnight" while they were traveling in India.

Kattan attended school in Jerusalem and has siblings, including writer Karim Kattan. Because much of his extended family had lived, traveled, or married outside of the West Bank, Kattan was exposed to a broad range of foods throughout his childhood. He learned to cook from his grandmother Julia and mother Micheline. Kattan completed a Bachelor of Arts (BA) in business administration in Paris. He then pursued a Master of Arts (MA) and studied hotel management at the Institut Vatel in Paris.

== Career ==
Upon returning to Bethlehem in 2000, Kattan worked at the InterContinental Hotel before it shut down after the Second Intifada. He subsequently found work at his father's kitchen business. During this time, Kattan started a local culinary competition. He found general knowledge of Palestinian cuisine lacking, and wanted to challenge the general categories of Mediterranean, Middle Eastern and Levantine, "which don't mean anything, to me", he said. "If you're having a meal in Northern Algeria it has nothing to do with the meal that you could have in South Turkey. And if you are having a meal in occupied Jaffa, most probably the only thing in common with Marseille is that some of the fish are the same, but it stops there."

Kattan founded a restaurant, Fawda, in Bethlehem in 2016. The restaurant featured a menu that was improvised daily based on local produce. It closed during the COVID-19 pandemic, with plans to reopen in late 2024. Kattan has also led food tours of Bethlehem and managed the Hosh Al-Syrian guesthouse.

During the COVID-19 lockdown, Kattan started the YouTube series Teta's Kitchen, in which he sought recipes from various mothers and grandmothers around historic Palestine. He hosted a radio segment and podcast titled Ramblings of a Chef for Radio Alhara.

In December 2022, Kattan opened a restaurant called Akub in the Notting Hill area of London. The restaurant combines British produce with Palestinian flavors. In 2023 with Elizabeth Kassis, he co-founded Kassa Boutique Hotel within Bethlehem's historic Sabagh house.

Kattan's debut cookbook Bethlehem: A Celebration of Palestinian Food, comprising 60 recipes, was published on 16 May 2024 by Hardie Grant. Nourie Flayhan provided the book's illustrations. The book is split into four sections, each based on a season of the year, and is interwoven with stories of Kattan's family and Palestinian food artisans and farmers. Bethelehem won Best International or Regional Cookery Book at the 2025 Guild of Food Writers (GFW) Awards.

In 2025, Kattan opened the restaurant Louf in Toronto.

== Personal life ==
Kattan is an atheist and secularist. "I don't see the world based on people's faiths... That's my French bit of my identity", he said.

== Bibliography ==
- Bethlehem: A Celebration of Palestinian Food (2024)
