= Lehar (DJ) =

Italian DJ and producer

Lorenzo Esposito (born 2 December 1983) known professionally as Lehar is an Italian DJ and producer and is signed by techno label Diynamic. With performances at Tomorrowland he belongs to the most prominent DJs of Venice.

== Musical career ==
Lehar was born in Naples, grew up near Venice and graduated from university at IULM. After attending parties with music by the likes of François Kevorkian and Tony Humphries he grew interest in electronic music. His first record was released at Connaisseur Recordings in 2013. Under this label Lehar published a remix of "Spirit Lights" by Of Norway and a collaboration with Musumeci named "Horizon". In 2016 he signed to Solomun's label Diynamic with the first release being a remix for Ost & Kjex called "Easy". These three tracks reached the number one spot at the Beatport electronic chart. In the same year he played his first tour called "All Through The Night" across several cities in Europe. On Diynamic Lehar released an album and has contributed to their "10 Years of Diynamic" album. In 2018, he played his second tour. He also had appearances at Tomorrowland in 2017, 2018 and 2019. In 2019, he was playing a residency show called "MUSE" in Ibiza.

== Discography ==
=== Releases ===
- 2015: Flora & Zephyr EP – Connaisseur Recordings
- 2015: Sargas EP – Connaisseur Recordings
- 2016: Lonestar Memories (10 Years Diynamic Compilation) – Diynamic Music
- 2016: Magical Realism EP – Diynamic Music
- 2016: Number One Hero EP – 2DIY4
- 2016: The White Diary EP – Connaisseur Recordings
- 2017: Lehar, Olderic – Il Sole – Siamese
- 2017: Picture: Lehar – Diynamic
- 2017: Lehar & Musumeci – Lotus Ep – Endless
- 2018: Penta EP – Multinotes
- 2018: Blue Wolf – Watergate Records
- 2019: Everything I Ever Did – Compost Black Label
- 2019: Da Levante feat. Aldebaran – Afterlife
- 2019: Signature EP – Multinotes

=== Remixes ===
- 2014: Kollektiv Turmstrasse – Tristesse (Lehar Remix) – Connaisseur Recordings
- 2015: Mario Aureo & Spieltape – Keep Pushin’ (Lehar Dub) – Moodmusic
- 2015: Mario Aureo & Spieltape – Keep Pushin’ (Lehar Remix) – Moodmusic
- 2015: Musumeci & The Element – Demiurgo (Lehar Remix) – Connaisseur
- 2015: Ost & Kjex – Easy (Lehar & Musumeci Remix) – Diynamic Music
- 2015: Of Norway – Spirit Lights (Lehar Remix) – Connaisseur Recordings
- 2016: Francesco Chiocci – Black Sunrise (Lehar Remix) – Connaisseur
- 2016: Sasse – Ani (Lehar Remix) – My favorite Robot
- 2017: Guy J, Khen – Prism (Lehar in Ipnosi Remix) – Lost & Found
- 2019: Colle, Oluhle – Owami (Lehar Remix) – TrueColors
