= Stimming (musician) =

Hamburg-based music producer

- Born: December 1983 (age 42)
- Genres: Electronic; house; dance
- Occupations: DJ; producer
- Instruments: Keyboard; violin; piano; drums
- Years active: 2007–present
- Labels: Diynamic; Terminal M; Buzzin' Fly; Freerange; Audiomatique; Green; 2DIY4; Pampa; D-Edge; HART & TIEF; Ki; Sunday; enja yellowbird; Awesome Soundwave
- Website: https://stimming.org/

Martin Stimming (born December 1983), better known under his stage name Stimming, is a music producer based in Hamburg. He is well known for using hand-made sounds and field recordings in his compositions, and crafting improvised sounds during live sets.

== Music ==
Born in Giessen, and raised in Butzbach, both near Frankfurt, Stimming is a classically-trained musician; he played the violin, piano and drums at 10. At 16, Stimming began producing electronic music, moving to Hamburg at the age of 19 to attend SAE Institute (School of Audio Engineering) where he did an Electronic Music Producer course.

In 2006, Stimming met DJs and producers Solomun and Adriano who had just launched their label Diynamic that year. He started releasing under Diynamic, having to date released four albums with the label as well as multiple singles. Many of Stimming's releases under Diynamic are of a classically-informed nature, including analogue instrument samples such as the violin. Stimming's music has been characterized by "heartstring-tugging tunes and acoustic feel."

In 2008, Stimming had his breakthrough hit, "Una Pena", which contained worked vocals by the Chilean folklore-singer Violeta Parra. In 2009, Stimming released his debut album Reflections to great acclaim earning him an Ibiza DJ Award in the category of 'Best Newcomer' in 2010. In 2012, Stimming and a friend of his reworked his track "November Morning" into a classical arrangement, and had the new version performed by the Brandenburgisches Staatsorchester Frankfurt and recorded. Stimming's third and self-titled album, Stimming, was recorded on the Baltic coast and released in 2013. In 2016, Stimming released his fourth and most conceptual LP Alpe Lusia, which was mostly produced over the period of one month in a secluded cabin in the Dolomites in Northern Italy. In 2018, Stimming released his fifth album Exodus, in cooperation with the German neo-classical pianist, Lambert via the Berlin-based Kryptox label. Later in the same year, Stimming was awarded the German Music Authors' Prize in the Composition Dance/Elektro category.

In 2025, Stimming released his ninth album Friedrich via his own label Stimming Recordings, including two standout singles "Keys Don´t Match" (Note: Major music sources—e.g. Spotify, Deezer, SoundCloud, but not Bandcamp—display the track's name with the Unicode acute accent mark as an apostrophe.) (featuring Dominique Fricot) and "Lucky Me", both of which were released beforehand. The album features two vocalists SALOMEA and Dominique Fricot. Stimming has also opened up an official remix contest for his track "Keys Don´t Match", later posting about the event on social media. The event was due on May 7. This led to the release of Keys Don´t Match in July the same year, featuring a selection of seven remixes of "Keys Don´t Match" each introduced by different artists. During an interview with Kyle Marno on Soundspace, Stimming chose "Keys Don´t Match" since "…I knew this track was a goldmine for a remixer – strong vocals, interesting harmonic possibilities, and medium tempo".

Stimming has also released various remixes for the likes of Claude VonStroke, Nina Kraviz, Stephan Bodzin and Robert Babicz, Marc Romboy, Kiasmos and deadmau5 amongst others. Stimming worked with the South African vocalist Lazarusman early in his career earning him a loyal fan base in the country, where he frequently performs and visit.

Stimming has cited DJ Krush and Amon Tobin as influences on his music.

== Live performances ==
Stimming has performed at numerous festivals worldwide including Diynamic Festival and Into The Woods festival in The Netherlands, Babylon Festival in Australia, Fusion Festival and Melt! Festival in Germany, Open Space Festival in France, The BPM Festival in Mexico and Rage Festival, South Africa.

== Equipment ==
Stimming is well known for incorporating the latest technology into his songs, working on a versatile range of equipment both in the studio and on live sets. He refuses to work with a mouse and keyboard, opting instead for pen-display equipment. He has also performed music on the 4D sound system. Stimming has reviewed several electronic music equipment in videos online for Electronic Beats TV. He has also stated he has never used a repeated sample in his work. Stimming frequently uses field recordings from mundane objects such as a coffee machine, children's toys or loose change in his recordings, and has admitted to taking his tape recorder everywhere he goes.

== Discography ==
=== As Stimming ===
==== Albums ====
Title	Details
Reflections	Released: April 6, 2009; Label: Diynamic Music; Format: MP3
Liquorice	Released: April 11, 2011; Label: Diynamic Music; Format: CD, MP3
Stimming	Featuring: Urzula Amen; Released: June 7, 2013; Label: Diynamic Music; Format: 12-inch, CD, MP3
Alpe Lusia	Released: April 29, 2016; Label: Diynamic Music; Format: 12-inch, CD, MP3
Ludwig	Featuring: Balbina; Released: June 18, 2021; Label: Stimming Recordings (self-released); Format: MP3
Elderberry	Released: September 29, 2023; Label: Awesome Soundwave; Format: MP3
Friedrich	Featuring: SALOMEA, Dominique Fricot; Released: April 24, 2025; Label: Stimming Recordings (self-released); Format: 12-inch, MP3

==== EPs ====
- Feuer & Eis (with Solomun) (12-inch, Diynamic Music, 2007)
- Funkworm EP (12-inch, Diynamic Music, 2007)
- Die Liebe (12-inch, Terminal M, 2008)
- Trilogy EP (with Solomun & H.O.S.H.) (12-inch, Diynamic Music, 2008)
- Mesdames EP (with Einmusik) (12-inch, Diynamic Music, 2008)
- Kleine Nachtmusik (12-inch/CD-R, Buzzin' Fly Records, 2008)
- Remix: Session 2 (with Solomun) (MP3, Diynamic Music, 2008)
- Una Pena EP (12-inch, CD-R, Diynamic Music, 2008)
- Short Story (12-inch, Freerange Records, 2008)
- Stormdrum EP (12-inch, Diynamic Music, 2009)
- Buxton Pipes (12-inch, Audiomatique Recordings, 2009)
- Gaensebluemchen (12-inch, Green, 2009)
- Change EP (12-inch, Diynamic Music, 2010)
- Cheesecake (12-inch, Green, 2011)
- Window Shopping EP (12-inch, Diynamic Music, 2012)
- November Morning EP (12-inch, 2DIY4, 2012)
- The Southern Sun EP (12-inch, Pampa Records, 2014)
- Stekker EP (with Johannes Brecht) (12-inch, Diynamic Music, 2015)
- Filosofia (with Stimming) by Renato Ratier (12-inch, D-Edge, 2016)
- Alpe Lusia Remixes (12-inch, Diynamic Music, 2016)
- Die Luft, der Garten und das Meer (12-inch, Ki Records, 2018)
- Eiger Nordwand EP (with Marcus Worgull) (12-inch, Sunday Music, 2020)
- Keys Don´t Match (Remixes) (MP3, self-released, 2025)

==== Singles ====
- "Frankfurt Main" on Franktfurt Main / Saida 222 (MP3, HART & TIEF, 2018)
- "Judith Maria" (MP3, self-released, 2021)
- "The Hyve" (MP3, self-released, 2021)
- "Circle of Thirds" (MP3, self-released, 2021)
- "Der Krokus" (with LBT) (MP3, enja yellowbird, 2022)
- "Golden Tree" (MP3, Awesome Soundwave, 2023)
- "People Do" (MP3, Awesome Soundwave, 2023)
- "Keys Don´t Match" (featuring Dominique Fricot) (MP3, self-released, 2025)
- "Lucky Me" (MP3, self-released, 2025)

==== Guest appearances ====
- "Trombone" on 5 Years Diynamic (CD, Diynamic Music, 2012)
- "Window Shopping" on Schneeweiss Presented by Oliver Koletzki by Oliver Koletzki (MP3, Stil vor Talent, 2013)
- "No. 17" on DJ Koze Presents Pampa Vol. 1 by DJ Koze (CD, Pampa Records, 2016)
- "Una Pena (Argy Nights of the Deep Tech Mix)" on Chronographic by Argy (MP3, These Days, 2016)
- "Trains Of Hope" on Schneeweiss VI: Presented by Oliver Koletzki by Oliver Koletzki (CD, Stil vor Talent, 2016)
- "The Anger (Mixed)" on Global Underground: Nubreed 10 (Mixed) by Oliver Schories (MP3, Global Underground, 2017)
- "The Gift That Never Stops To Give" on Cocoon Compilation S (12-inch/CD, Cocoon Recordings, 2019)
- "She Hates That Chord" & "Morgentau" on Awesome Trax Vol. 1 (MP3, Awesome Soundwave, 2025)
- "Skin" (featuring Modise Sekgothe), "In You Go" & "The Dust Has Settled" (featuring Clint Smith) on Skin by Lazarusman (12-inch, Moodfamily, 2026)

==== Remixes ====
- "Vabanque (Stimming Remix)" on Vabanque by Manuel Tur (12-inch, Freerange Records, 2008)
- "Blacklist (Stimming Remix)" on Blacklist by Pezzner (MP3, Freerange Records, 2010)
- "Moses (Stimming Remix)" on Sascha Funke vs. Nina Kraviz - Moses by Sascha Funke (MP3, BPitch Control, 2010)
- "Mine to keep (Stimming Remix)" by Blagger on Ripperton presents Retrospectiv Remixes 2007-2011 (MP3, Tamed Musiq, 2011)
- "Raise Your Weapon (Stimming Remix)" on Raise Your Weapon (Remixes) by deadmau5 (CD-R, EMI Music Denmark, 2011)
- "Close These Curtains (Stimming Remix)" on Remixes by Yoko Duo (12-inch, Fauxpas Music, 2013)
- "Kids (Stimming Remix)" on What I Do (Remixes) by Ian Pooley (MP3, Pooled Music, 2013)
- "Lion (Stimming Remix)" on Lion by HVOB (12-inch, Stil Vor Talent, 2013)
- "Paused (Stimming Remix)" on Blurred EP by Kiasmos (12-inch/CD, Erased Tapes Records, 2017)
- "Amadou (Stimming Remix)" on BLD Remixes B by Acid Pauli (12-inch, Ouïe, 2018)
- "Johnny Belinda (Stimming Remix)" on Johnny Belinda Remixes by Active Child (MP3, Subtract Music, 2018)
- "Brandenburg (Stimming Remix)" by Apparat (MP3, Mute Records, 2019)
- "Genou Respirant (Stimming Remix)" by Koki Nakano (MP3, No Format!, 2021)
- "Waves (Stimming Rework)" by Aukai (MP3, self-released, 2021)
- "Lonely Jester" by Fka Mash (MP3, Atjazz Record Company, 2022)
- "Cyborgs Like Unicorns Too (Stimming Remix)" on Aldeapolis by Bonfante (12-inch, 3000Grad, 2022)
- "Higher Than Me (Stimming Remix)" (featuring JJ Dawson) on Higher Than Me (Remixes) by Ed Ed (MP3, Frau Blau, 2022)
- "Kreatur de Nacht (Stimming & Johannes Brecht Remix)" (featuring Isolation Berlin) on Nobody Is Not Loved (Remixed) by Solomun (12-inch, BMG & NINL, 2022)
- "Storm On Lake St. Claire (Stimming Remix)" by Claude VonStroke on Dirtybird Scrambled (MP3, DIRTYBIRD, 2023)
- "Mend It (Stimming Remix)" on Mend It / Your Eyes (Remixes) by Lazarusman (MP3, Connaisseur Recordings, 2023)
- "Wintergreen (Stimming Remix)" on Mindibu Remixes by Stavroz (MP3, Moodfamily, 2023)
- "Your Body 2011 (Stimming Remix)" (featuring Michael Marshall) on The Kosmos Remixes by Tom Novy (MP3, NITRON Music, 2023)
- "Guardian Angel (Stimming Remix)" on Guardian Angel by Henri Bergmann (12-inch, Crosstown Rebels, 2024)

=== As Stimming x Lambert ===
==== Albums ====
Title	Details
Exodus	Released: March 9, 2018; Label: Kryptox; Format: 12-inch, MP3
Positive	Released: October 15, 2021; Label: XXIM Records; Format: 12-inch, MP3

==== EPs ====
- Positive (Piano Versions) (MP3, XXIM Records, 2022)
