= Rumpta =

2026 single by Skrillex and Solomun

Single by Skrillex and Solomun
- Released: July 1, 2026
- Genre: House; industrial dance
- Length: 3:46
- Label: Diynamic
- Songwriters: Sonny Moore; Mladen Solomun
- Producers: Skrillex; Solomun

Skrillex singles chronology
"Thistle" (2026)	"Rumpta" (2026)	"Mirage" (2026)

Solomun singles chronology
"Kinesphere" (2026)	"Rumpta" (2026)

"Rumpta" is a song by American record producer Skrillex and Bosnian–German producer Solomun. The song was released without announcement on July 1, 2026, using a sample of "It's No Crime" by Babyface.

== Background ==
Skrillex appeared as a special guest for a Solomun show on June 29, 2025, who was performing for the 2025 edition of Defected music festival. The success of the performance served as the catalyst for the two to work together on a song.

== Cover art ==
The cover art consists of a photo taken by Naisha, a friend of Skrillex who was featured on his studio albums Soma (2026) and Fuck U Skrillex You Think Ur Andy Warhol but Ur Not!! (2025).

== Reception ==
The Fader said the song could "work well on the neon-lit dance floors of Ibiza, where Solomun has his long-running residency" and called the song "just the latest musical flex in a very busy summer for both artists". CULTR described it as "a compelling sonic space, blending nostalgic house vocals with a contemporary edge" and said it was "built for peak-time dance floors".

== Live performances ==
Solomun played the song live during his sets at Tomorrowland 2025 and Electric Daisy Carnival 2026 as an unknown ID track. He also played the song during his shows at Tehmplo Tulum and his two sold-out shows at Alexandra Palace, all of which occurred before the song was officially released.

== Charts ==
Chart performance for "Rumpta"
Chart (2026)	Peak position
Lithuania Airplay (TopHit)	85
New Zealand Hot Singles (RMNZ)	39
Paraguay Anglo Airplay (Monitor Latino)	14
