= Mirage (comics) =

Mirage, in comic, may refer to:

- Danielle Moonstar, an X-Men superheroine who sometimes uses the codename Mirage
- Mirage (DC Comics), the Batman minor supervillain Mike and the Teen Titan superheroine Miriam Delgado
- Mirage (Marvel Comics), the Spider-Man supervillain Desmond Charne
- Mirage (Image Comics), a Haunt supporting character and secret agent
- Mirage Studios

== See also ==
- Mirage (disambiguation)
