= Mirage (Jagjit Singh album) =

Studio album by Jagjit Singh
- Released: 1 February 1996
- Genre: Ghazal
- Length: 42:15
- Label: Saregama

Mirage is a 1996 Urdu ghazal album by the Indian singer Jagjit Singh, released by Saregama.

== Track listing ==
1. "Apni marzi se" (also the title song of the popular 1990s TV series Sailaab)
2. "Dushman ko bhi seene se lagana"
3. "Ek barahman ne kaha hai"
4. "Koi chaudavi raat ka chaand"
5. "Main rahe meena rahe"
6. "Mujhe jeene do"
7. "Rishta kya hai tera mera"
8. "Zindagi se badi sazaa hi nahin"
