= The Mirage (Mahfouz novel) =

1948 novel by Naguib Mahfouz

2009 English translation (publ. American University in Cairo Press)

The Mirage (Arabic السراب Al-Sarab) is a 1948 Egyptian novel by Naguib Mahfouz. The novel was filmed as al-Sarab (The Mirage) by Anwar al-Shinawi. Mahfouz has said that it is a personal novel based on his upbringing. Novel translated to English by Nancy Roberts.

== Plot ==
The narrator, Kamel, recounts the story of his childhood in Cairo. Kamel lives in his grandfather's home with his divorced mother. His mother is very caring and pampers him excessively, until he becomes shy and isolated from others. He sleeps in the same bed with her until he is 25. Kamel struggles in school due to his shyness, and he attends a university but fails to graduate.

He gets a government job and marries a teacher, but discovers on his wedding night that he is impotent. Kamel sees a psychiatrist to try to overcome his impotence, and eventually begins a sexual relationship with a prostitute. His mother and wife both die, and he decides to continue his relationship with the prostitute.
