= The Mirage (Al-Suwaidi book) =

2015 book by Jamal Sanad Al-Suwaidi

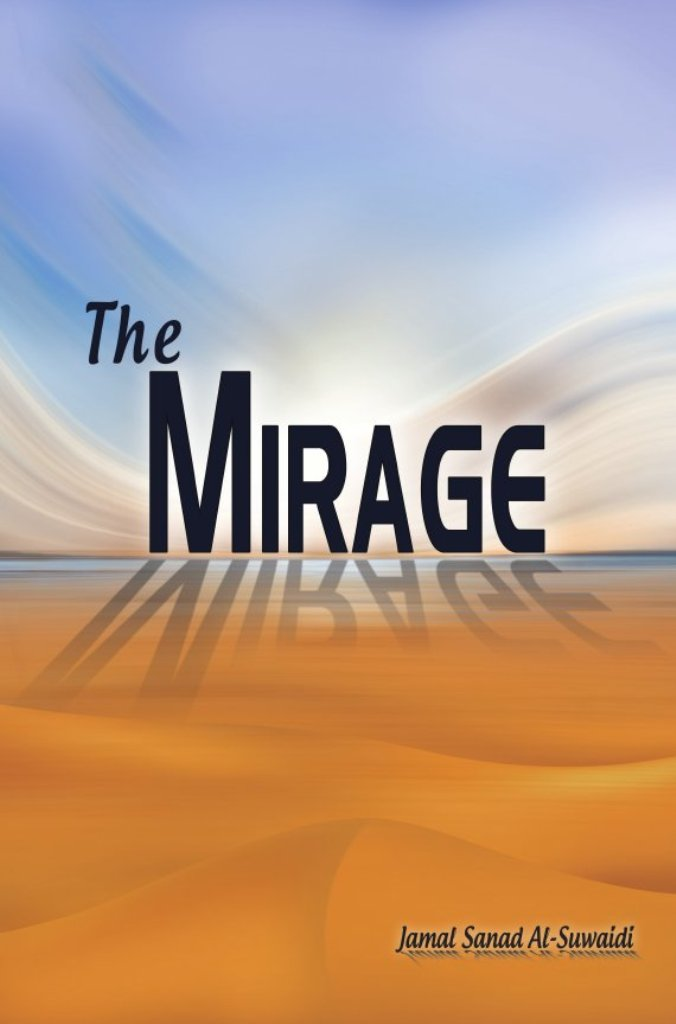
- Cover, first edition
- Author: Jamal Sanad Al-Suwaidi
- Language: English
- Subject: Islam
- Genre: Nonfiction
- Publisher: Emirates Center For Strategic Studies And Research
- Publication date: July 15, 2015
- Publication place: UAE
- Media type: Print (hardback)
- Pages: 823 pp.
- ISBN: 978-9948230762

The Mirage is a book written by Jamal Sanad Al-Suwaidi, Director of the Emirates Center for Strategic Studies and Research in Abu Dhabi, UAE. This book, originally published in Arabic as “Al-Sarab” (Arabic: السراب), is a review of the history, origin, evolution, practices and objectives of political Islam in Arab and Muslim societies. It also explains the danger of related political religious groups. Its title is a metaphor about the misleading religious solutions proposed by Islamist groups, to contemporary social problems.

== Summary ==
The Mirage highlights the struggle of the Arab and Islamic world against the actions of religious extremist organizations that pose military and security threats but also a significant intellectual challenge. One of its main objectives is to protect future generations from the misleading calls of “rebuilding the Islamic Islamic Caliphate” from Islamist groups that do not represent true Islam. After careful research on the intellectual, political, cultural and social implications of religious extremism, its author Al-Suwaidi suggests appropriate solutions such as “separating religion from power”. The book also emphasizes Islam as a source of identity and social cohesion in both the Arab and Islamic world.

The author tracks the historical evolution of the phenomenon of religious extremism and studies specific examples from their inception through their peak in the early 2010s, to their downfall. In particular, he explains the causes of recent failures of the Muslim Brotherhood-led governments that took power in some Arab and Muslim countries. Then, Al-Suwaidi exposes the fallacy of the slogans that attracted such veneration among sympathizers. He advocates “separating religion from power” as a method of dealing with this issue.

The book suggests similarities between certain aspects of the ideologies and practices in the European Middle Ages and the intellectual and political structures, relationship between religion and politics, and the role of clergy in religious extremist groups in the modern Arab and Muslim world.

For researchers, decision makers and the general public, this book reveals the intellectual and ideological characteristics of religious extremist groups and appears as an effort to deconstruct the various obstacles they pose to progress and development in Arab and Muslim countries.

The Mirage poses five main existential questions:

- Modern Arab and Muslim countries may be reenacting the same political and religious battle fought by Europeans five centuries ago during the Middle Ages. If this assumption is true, are Islamic civilizations lagging five centuries behind their European counterparts?
- Should we consider religious Dark Ages as prerequisites for reaching modern civilization as we know it?
- Can a modern, secular civilization coexist with religion and include its teachings?
- Why do some groups in Arab and Muslim societies consider that a religious discourse should end where progress and development start?
- Why have referential concepts been overwhelmed by destructive ideas disseminated by political religious groups?

== Reception ==
=== Book reviews ===
Mohamed Noman Galal, a Member of the Egyptian Council of Foreign Relations, former Egyptian Ambassador and author reviewed the book. Galal recognized it as "a scholarly encyclopedia that is based on careful research, references and multiple end notes to objectively establish each and every fact it contains (without hypocrisy, prejudice or delusion)"

Abdul Hamid Al-Ansari, wrote a review of The Mirage in an article titled "The Mirage: An Islamic Religious Perspective". Al-Ansari said that: "I recognize that the book offers a mature and insightful view on the instructions, guidance and values of Islam, in terms of the transformation of the individual and society"

=== Events ===
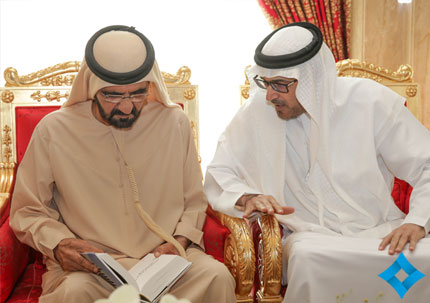
Sheikh Mohammed bin Rashid Al Maktoum, Vice President, Prime Minister and Ruler of Dubai, receiving of a copy of The Mirage

In March 2015, Shaikh Mohammad Bin Rashid Al Maktoum, Vice-president, Prime minister of the UAE and Ruler of Dubai, received a copy of the Arabic version of the book. In addition, during a meeting held at Abu Dhabi police general police headquarters, Sheikh Saif bin Zayed Al Nahyan, Deputy Prime Minister and Minister of Interior of UAE, was presented with the book.

On 8 March 2015, Sheikh Hamad bin Mohammed Al Sharqi, member of the Supreme Council and ruler of Fujairah, received a copy of the book and said that it elucidates facts about the misuse of Islam by extremist groups.

On April 14, 2015, the United Arab Emirates University organized a symposium to review and discuss The Mirage. On 19 May 2015, the book was also the subject of a gathering at the Emirates Center for Strategic Studies and Research in Abu Dhabi themed The Mirage: Enlightened Thought in Countering Terrorism.

== See also ==
- Political aspects of Islam
- Islam and secularism
- Islamism
