= Mirage (MPH and Skrillex song) =

Single by MPH and Skrillex
- Released: August 14, 2026
- Length: 4:51
- Label: Capitol Records

Skrillex singles chronology
"Rumpta" (2026)	"Mirage" (2026)

"Mirage" (originally known as "Bunga") is a song by American record producer Skrillex and British producer MPH, set to be released on August 14, 2026.

== Live performances ==
MPH played the song for the first time at Electric Daisy Carnival 2026 and later played it during his set at Lightning in a Bottle 2026.
