= Radio Alhara =

Radio station in Palestine

- Type: Internet radio
- Country: Palestine
- First air date: 20 March 2020; 6 years ago
- Availability: Global
- Key people: Yazan Khalili, Yousef Anastas, Elias Anastas, Ibrahim Owais, Said Abu Jaber and Mothanna Hussein
- Official website: www.radioalhara.net

Radio Alhara (Arabic: راديو الحارة) is a Palestinian online radio station broadcasting from Bethlehem since its launch in March 2020. The station grew in public notoriety when it launched a solidarity campaign with protests surrounding the Sheikh Jarrah controversy, which it termed the "Sonic Liberation Front."

In addition to radio shows broadcast in solidarity with international movements for self-determination, the station raises awareness around the civil and human rights issues facing Palestinians living under Israeli occupation. Radio Alhara has received support from a global coalition of musicians and its shows have been syndicated on stations internationally. The station has also organized a fundraising campaign for relief following the 2020 Beirut explosion and broadcast shows in solidarity with Mahsa Amini protests in Iran.

== Early history ==
Radio AlHara was founded by group of friends Yazan Khalili, Yousef Anastas, Elias Anastas, Said Abu Jaber, Mothanna Hussein and Ibrahim Owais on 20 March 2020. They were located in Bethlehem, Ramallah, and Amman. The show started as an online music broadcasting space between these cities, open to the public sending contributions via a Dropbox link and multi-language presentation. They received contributions as not only music, but also sound content, visual, and art and was a communal project from its beginnings.

Yousef and Elias Anastas were influenced by their background in architecture in their approach to this project - "For us, architecture is very much linked to music at its core. It is about fluidity and how objects and spaces interpenetrate each other. This relates very powerfully with music".

== Marathon Radio Broadcasts ==
Radio AlHara has started marathon shows to raise awareness around civil and human rights issues facing Palestinians living under Israeli Occupation, as well as struggles in surrounding countries like Iran. The first one was in Summer 2020, where in response to mass annexation plans by Israel prime minister Benjamin Netanyahu and support from then-US President Donald Trump, they broadcast a 72-hour anti-colonial, anti-racist musical event under the name Fil Mishmish, which also set up the stage for their later broadcasts.

In May 2021, the radio went silent for 24 hours in solidarity with forced evictions of the occupied district of Sheikh Jarrah, which was met with several messages in solidarity from around the world, leading to the creation of "Sonic Liberation Front". Sonic Liberation Front was a daily program that started out by broadcasting recorded sounds of the protests of the forced evictions, and grew to include submissions of similar sounds from struggles and injustices across the world. Under this same banner, they have partnered with other radio stations across the globe, including Soho Radio in London in May 2021 for a show titled "DJs Against Arm Sales".

In September 2022, Sonic Liberation Front broadcast two 12-hour shows in solidarity with Mahsa Amini protests in Iran after the murder of 22 year-old Mahsa Amini at the hands of the country's police, which included a lineup of women and non-binary musicians.
