= Diynamic =

German record label

Diynamic Music
- Type: Private
- Industry: Music
- Genre: Electronic music, House music
- Founded: Hamburg, Germany 2006
- Founder: Solomun and Adriano Trolio
- Headquarters: Hamburg, Germany
- Area served: Worldwide
- Website: www.diynamic.com

Diynamic is an underground electronic music label based in Hamburg, Germany. The DJ, producer and three time DJ Awards winner for Best Producer and Best Deep House DJ, Mladen Solomun is one of the founders along with Adriano Trolio.

== History ==
Before Adriano Trolio and Mladen Solomun founded Diynamic Music on November 4, 2006, Adriano worked as a promoter. He was one of the first guys who introduce the electro-house to Hamburg around 2002. At that time Solomun and Trolio throw monthly parties in which Solomun met Stimming and H.O.S.H with the same idea, to create their own label. The DIY name came up to make a reference to DIgital music.

They are called Diynamic Music instead of Diynamic Records because there is not specific Diynamic sound. When they started, Diynamic Music used to be minimal, and they were also one of the first to try to mix old school Detroit sound in a modern European way. In 2013 the new kind of deep house that Diynamic played had many pop influences. It contained many vocals, a slow BPM, catchy bass-lines and sometimes even a chorus.

In 2011, Adriano and Mladen launched their sub-label, 2DIY4 (to die for) a platform for anything that does not necessarily fit to Diynamic concept but they consider has to be released. This means bringing in a more overt pop influence.

== Artists ==
For ten years now Diynamic have hosted big factors in the German and International house music scene.

- Solomun
- Stimming
- Southside Dance
- HOSH
- Kollektiv Turmstraße
- Adriatique
- NTFO
- Ben Sterling
- DJ Phono
- OST & KJEX
- Karmon
- THYLADOMID
- Magdalena
- Notre Dame
- Mila Journée
- Undercatt
- Johannes Brecht
- Lehar
- ARTBAT
- Josh Gigante
- Sonickraft
- Silver Mx
- Mau P
- Graumann

== Diynamic Festival ==
With the idea of expanding into a more complete brand instead of club only, Studio 80's representatives Jaap Mutsaers, Wytze Dijk and Diynamic created The Diynamic Festival. The festival debuted on May 18, 2013 at the Arena Park in Amsterdam. Since then, organisers have taken the concept on the road hosting large-scale showcases in Mexico, Brazil and Ibiza, featuring strictly the Diynamic artists only.

The second Diynamic Festival took place on May 30 at the Amsterdam Bos, a large forest about 30 minutes drive from the city centre.

On May 29 two stages were presented for the third Diynamic Festival, the usual outdoor big mainstage and the new indoor second stage (all acts played longer sets).

On May 27, 2016, the Diynamic Festival returned to the Amsterdam Forest but this time in a different location called “Land Van Bosse” – an area deep within the forest.
