= Kollektiv Turmstraße =

German musical duo

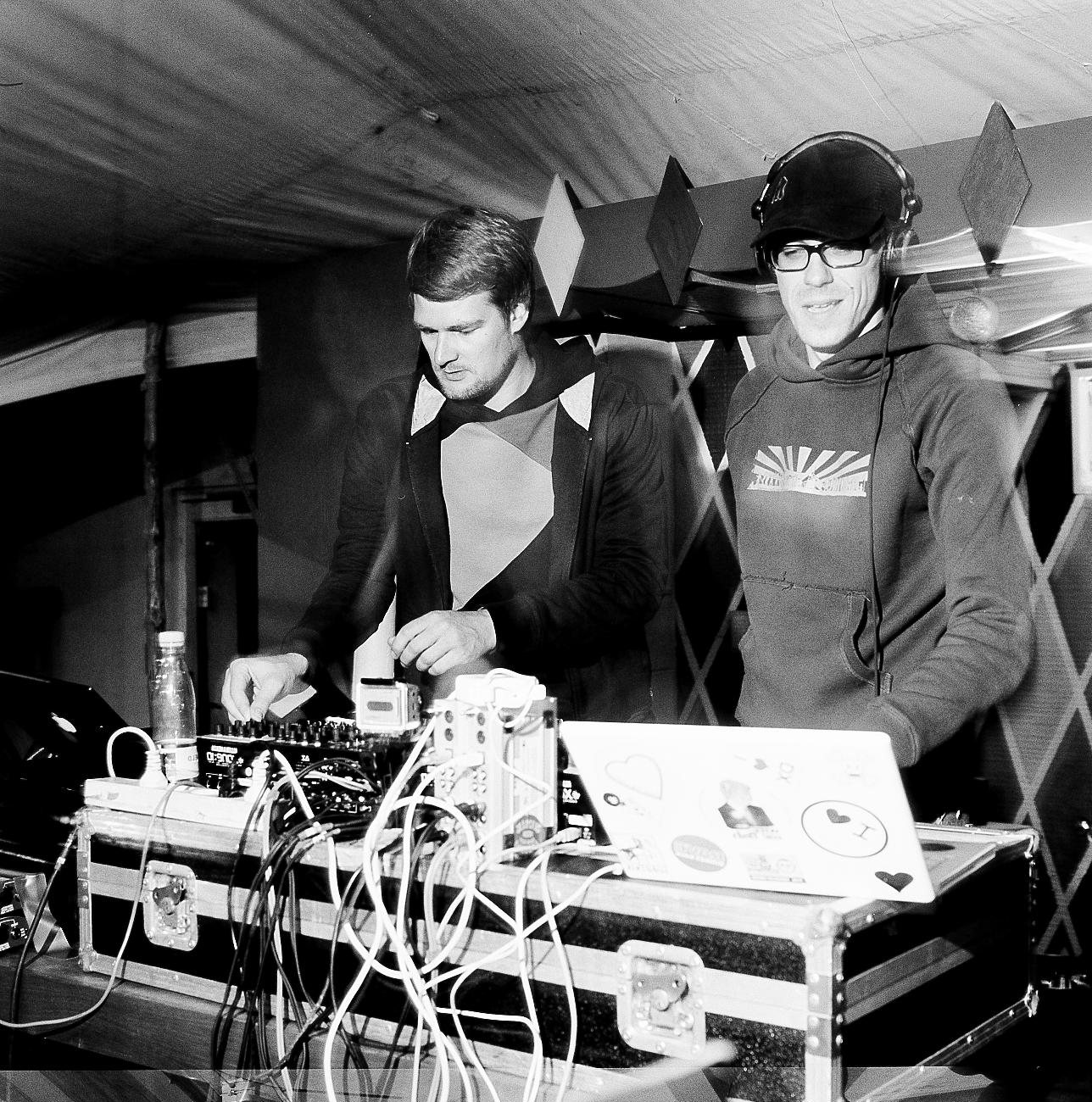
- Kollektiv Turmstraße in 2010

Background information
- Origin: Hamburg, Germany
- Genres: minimal techno
- Years active: 1998–present
- Members: Nico Plagemann
- Past members: Christian Hilscher

Kollektiv Turmstraße is a German musical project.

Originally established as a duo by Nico Plagemann and Christian Hilscher in 1998, in Hamburg, it released tracks on various compilation albums before producing their own album Verrückte Welt in 2006. This was followed by Rebellion der Träumer in 2010. The musical style can be broadly labeled as minimal techno.

It has performed at such festivals as Melt, Homerun, Off Week and Distortion.

In 2023, the group announced Christian Hilscher’s departure.

== Discography ==
=== Albums ===
- 2006: Verrückte Welt (No Response)
- 2010: Rebellion der Träumer (Connaisseur Recordings)
- 2013: Musik Gewinnt Freunde Collection
- 2023: Unity of Opposites

=== EPs and singles ===
- 2004: New Weakness EP (No Response)
- 2006: Disconnect Me (Ostwind Records)
- 2006: Musik gewinnt Freunde (Musik Gewinnt Freunde)
- 2007: Abenteuer Alltag EP (Diynamic Music)
- 2007: Farbenlehre (Musik Gewinnt Freunde)
- 2007: Grillen im Park (Ostwind Records)
- 2007: Tristesse (Connaisseur Recordings)
- 2008: Blutsbrüder (Musik Gewinnt Freunde)
- 2008: Holunderbaum EP (Musik Gewinnt Freunde)
- 2008: Mondscheinprimaten (Baalsaal Music)
- 2009: Like The First Day EP (Diynamic Music)
- 2009: Luechtoorn EP (Musik Gewinnt Freunde)
- 2009: Melodrama Remixes (Ostwind Records)
- 2010: Grillen im Park Remixes (Ostwind Records)
- 2010: Rebellion der Träumer (Connaisseur Recordings)
- 2012: Ordinary EP (Musik Gewinnt Freunde)
- 2015: Sry I'm Late EP (Diynamic Music)
- 2019: Ribbon Reef EP (Musik Gewinnt Freunde)
- 2022: YAP EP (Not Sorry Music)
