= Solomun (musician) =

Bosnian-German DJ (born 1975)

- Born: Mladen Solomun; December 27, 1975 (age 50); Travnik, SR Bosnia and Herzegovina, SFR Yugoslavia
- Genres: Deep house; techno; melodic house and techno; indie dance
- Occupations: DJ; producer; remixer
- Instrument: Synthesizer
- Years active: 2002–present
- Label: Diynamic

Mladen Solomun (born December 27, 1975), better known under his stage name Solomun, is a Bosnian-German DJ, producer and remixer. He is a four-time winner of the DJ Awards for Best Producer, Best DJ, and Best Melodic House.

== Musical career ==
After Solomun was born in Travnik, Yugoslavia (today Bosnia and Herzegovina). He later moved to Hamburg with his family, where he grew up. As a young boy, he worked in construction for his father. He later founded a small film production company with friends. He worked in film for about five years before pursuing a career in music.

His cousin, who frequented nightclubs, brought him cassette tapes whenever he came to town. These tapes introduced Solomun to music beyond commercial radio content. From then on, he started purchasing vinyl records, and eventually playing at House of Youth at the age of 16 for other teenagers. Solomun started producing music at the age of 23.

For about one year before he began producing on his own, he learned production skills from a good friend that ran a hip-hop label.

In 2005, Solomun began producing music, founding the record label Diynamic in late 2005 with his partner Adriano Trolio, who manages the booking for Diynamic. The motto for Diynamic is "Do It Yourself". Solomun's first EP on Diynamic, Solomun EP, came out in 2006. Since then, he has released many other EPs and compilations, as well as the 2009 album Dance Baby. In December 2010, he launched a second label, the more experimental 2DIY4.

In 2011, Solomun remixed Noir & Haze's "Around." The track was dubbed Remix of the Year by Resident Advisor. He was named Mixmag's "DJ of the Year" in 2012. He was also awarded Producer of the Year by the DJ Awards in Ibiza, and Best International DJ by the Cool Awards in Brazil that same year.

Until the end of June 2014, he owned the Hamburg-based club Ego, co-run by his sister and Adriano Trolio.

Solomun's musical roots are in hip-hop, soul, funk, and R&B. His sound has been described as "house music, but with deep, ultra funky basslines, euphoric melodies and emotionally charged vocals".

In From at least 2015-2016, he held two residencies (both dubbed Solomun +1) in Ibiza, at night-clubs Pacha and Destino.

Solomun started 2016 with two events at The BPM Festival including Diynamic in the Jungle and Solomun +1 with Mano Le Tough. Following that, the Bosnian artist continued touring across North America. The Diynamic family then celebrated ten years at Watergate in Berlin on April 9, 2016, which they followed with a ten-year jubilee at DC-10 in Ibiza on August 19, 2016.

He has played at events like Ultra Europe, Exit Festival, Melt! Festival, Tomorrowland, and Movement Croatia in 2016 and 2017, and also at Hungexpo in 2018.

In 2018, Solomun played himself as an in-residence DJ for the video game Grand Theft Auto Online, as part of the After Hours update. Additionally, Solomun's music video for "Customer is King" was made entirely within Grand Theft Auto V's engine as part of a larger collaboration between him and Rockstar Games.

== Industry awards ==
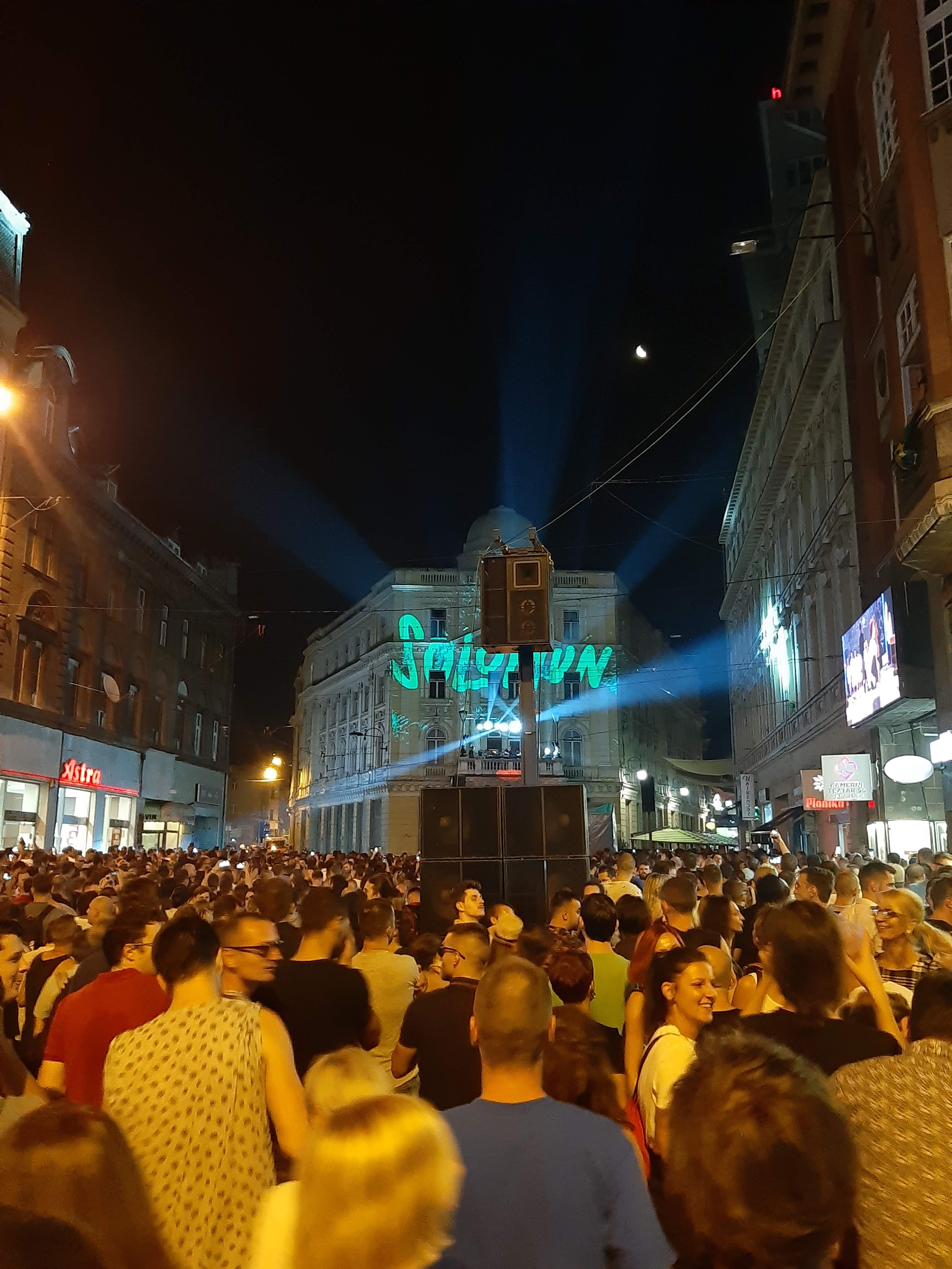
Solomun performing live in Sarajevo in August 2019

=== 2011 ===
- Remix of the Year – Around (Noir & Haze) – Resident Advisor (UK)
- Most Charted Artist" No. 04 Resident Advisor (UK)
- Best Remix No. 02 – Around (Noir & Haze) – Groove Magazine (DE, AT, CH)
- Best Remix No. 03 – Let's Go Back (Kraak & Smaak ) – Groove Magazine (DE, AT, CH)
- Best Producer No. 02 – Groove Magazine (DE, AT, CH)
- Best DJ No. 03 – Groove Magazine (DE, AT, CH)
- Best DJ No. 05 – De:Bug Magazine (DE, AT, CH)

=== 2012 ===
- Winner – DJ of the Year – Mixmag Magazine (UK)
- Winner – Best Producer – DJ Awards Ibiza (ES)
- Winner – Best International DJ – Cool Awards Brazil (BR)
- Best International Tour – Rio Music Conference Award (BR)
- Best Producer – Groove Magazine (DE, AT, CH)
- Best Label Diynamic – Groove Magazine (DE, AT, CH)
- Best DJ No. 03 – Groove Magazine (DE, AT, CH)
- Best Track No. 04 Kackvogel – Groove Magazine (DE, AT, CH)
- Best Producer No. 6 – Faze Mag (DE, AT, CH)
- Best Label Diynamic No. 5 Faze Mag (DE, AT, CH)
- Best Track No. 14 Kackvogel – Faze Mag (DE,AT,CH)
- Best DJ No. 22 – Resident Advisor (UK)
- Best Compilation No. 05 (Watergate 11) – DJ Mag (UK)
- Best Compilation No. 05 (Watergate 11) – Mixmag Magazine (UK)

=== 2013 ===
- Winner – Category: Deep House – DJ Awards Ibiza (ES)
- Best DJ #24 – Resident Advisor (UK)

=== 2014 ===
- Best DJ No. 26 – Resident Advisor (UK)

=== 2015 ===
- Winner – Category: Deep House – DJ Awards Ibiza (ES)
- Winner – Best DJ: Solomun – DJ Mag Italia (IT)
- Winner – Best Night: "Solomun +1" (Sundays at Pacha) – DJ Mag Italia (IT)
- Best DJ #13 – Resident Advisor (UK)

=== 2016 ===
- Best DJ: #1 (Deep House, public vote) // Beatport
- Best DJ: #5 // Resident Advisor
- Best DJ: #1 // DJ Mag Italia (IT)
- Best Night: "Solomun+1" (Sundays at Pacha) // DJ Mag Italia (IT)
- Best Remixes // DJ Mag Italia (IT):
  - Whilk & Misky – Clap Your Hands (Solomun Remix)
  - Ost & Kjex – Queen of Europe (Solomun Remix)
- Ibiza's most shazamed summer hits:
  - #3 Whilk & Misky – Clap Your Hands (Solomun Remix)

=== 2017 ===
- Best DJ: #1 // FAZE Mag (DE/AT/CH)
- Best Remix: Age Of Love – The Age Of Love (Solomun Renaissance Remix) // FAZE Mag (DE/AT/CH)

=== 2018 ===
- Winner – Category: Melodic House and Techno kind of– DJ Awards Ibiza (ES)
- Best DJ: #3 // FAZE Mag (DE/AT/CH)

=== 2019 ===
- Winner – Best International DJ – Cool Awards Brazil (BR)

== Discography ==
=== Releases ===
- 2005 Galaxy Empire – Mudra Records
- 2005 Jackpot – Schanzen Rec. – CD Compilation
- 2005 Frei – Schanzen Rec. – CD Compilation
- 2006 Do It Yourself EP – Diynamic Music
- 2006 Nachrichten EP – Diynamic Music
- 2006 Oelkersallee EP – Diynamic Music
- 2006 Solomun EP – Diynamic Music
- 2007 Feuer und Eis EP – Diynamic Music
- 2007 Hooked / Jungle River Cruise – liebe*detail
- 2007 Koboldmaki – Sonar Kollektiv
- 2007 Meerkats – Sonar Kollektiv
- 2007 Mischwaren EP – Diynamic Music
- 2007 Sambada EP – Dessous Recordings
- 2007 Second Kiss in Winter / Four Seasons EP – Diynamic Music
- 2008 Deadman/Beauty and the Beast – Four:Twenty
- 2008 Ghostdog / Trilogy EP – Diynamic Music
- 2008 Flying Pics EP – Diynamic Music
- 2008 Beauty and the Beast / Dead Man – Four:Twenty
- 2008 Black Rose / Trickski Remix – Sonar Kollektiv
- 2008 Woodstep EP – Dessous
- 2008 International Hustle EP – Four:Twenty
- 2008 Argy and Solomun – Focus On – Poker Flat
- 2008 Midnight Call EP – Compost black
- 2008 Federgewicht EP – Diynamic Music
- 2009 Carnivale / Factory – Phil e
- 2009 Dance Baby – Diynamic Music
- 2010 Sisi EP – Leena Music
- 2011 Daddy's Jam – Rebellion
- 2011 Love Recycled EP – 2DIY4
- 2011 Zappzerapp EP – Diynamic Music
- 2011 Challenge Everyday EP – Diynamic Music
- 2011 Something We All Adore EP – Supernature
- 2012 Living On – from: 5 years Diynamic Charity Compilation – Diynamic Music
- 2012 Kackvogel – Watergate Records
- 2013 Bootcamp – Diynamic Music
- 2014 Samson – Diynamic Music
- 2014 Friends – 2DIY4
- 2015 "Zora" – Diynamic Music
- 2016 Let it out – Solomun feat. Liu Bei – Diynamic Music
- 2016 Solomun Selected Remixes 2009–2015 – Diynamic Music
- 2018 Customer Is King EP – Diynamic Music
- 2020 Home – Diynamic Music
- 2021 Nobody Is Not Loved - NINL
- 2026 "Rumpta" – Diynamic Music

=== Remixes ===
- 2007 Bearweasel – "Monkier" (Solomun Remix) – Supernature
- 2007 Barbo – "Barbi in Love" (Solomun Remix) – Buzzin Fly
- 2007 Monoroom – "Feed Me" (Solomun Remix) – Freunde Tontraeger
- 2008 Tiger Stripes – "Hooked" (Solomun Remix) – Liebe*detail
- 2008 Kollektiv Turmstrasse – "Blutsbrueder" (Solomun Rmx) – MGF
- 2008 Palm Skin Productions – "Wonderful Thing" (Solomun Remix ) – Freerange
- 2008 Marbert Rocel – "Cornflakes" (Solomun Remix ) – Compost Black
- 2008 Christian Prommer – Daft Punk/"Around the World" – (Solomun Remix)
- 2010 Oliver Koletzki And Fran – "Echoes" (Solomun Remix) – Stil Vor Talent
- 2011 Gorge – "Garuna" (Solomun Remix) – 8bit
- 2011 Edu Imbernon and Los Suruba – "Punset" (Solomun Remix) – Eklektisch
- 2011 DJ Hell – "Germania" (Solomun Remix) – Gigolo Records
- 2011 Noir and Haze – "Around" (Solomun Remix) – Noir Music
- 2011 Kraak and Smaak – "Let's Go Back" (feat. Romanthony) (Solomun Remix)
- 2011 Tiefschwarz – "Corporate Butcher" (Solomun Remix) – Watergate Records
- 2012 Pool – "Game Over" (Solomun Remix) – 2DIY4
- 2012 Luca C & Brigante feat. Roisin Murphy – "Flash of Light" (Solomun Remix) – Southern Fried Records
- 2013 Foals – "Late Night" (Solomun Remix)
- 2013 Tiga vs. Audion – "Let's Go Dancing" (Solomun Remix) – Turbo Recordings
- 2014 Claude VonStroke – "The Clapping Track" (Solomun Remix) – Dirtybird
- 2014 Broken Bells – "Holding on For Life" (Solomun Remix) – Sony Music
- 2014 Lana del Rey – West Coast (Solomun Remix)- Polydor Ltd.
- 2015 Liu Bei – Atlas World (Solomun Day / Night Remixes) – 2DIY4
- 2015 Josef Salvat – Hustler (Solomun Remix) – Columbia
- 2015 Paul Kalkbrenner – Cloud Rider (Solomun Remix) – Sony Music
- 2015 Editors – Our Love (Solomun Remix) – Pias
- 2015 Johannes Brecht – Breathe! (Solomun Edit) – Diynamic Music
- 2015 Whilk & Misky – Clap Your Hands (Solomun Remix) – Island/Universal
- 2016 Interpol – Everything is wrong (Solomun Remix)- Matador
- 2016 Ost&Kjex feat. Anne Lise Frokedal – Queen of Europe (Solomun Remix) – Diynamic Music
- 2016 Stimming – Alpe Lusia (Solomun Remix) – Diynamic Music
- 2016 Moderat – Eating Hooks (Siriusmo Remix, Solomun Edit) – Monkeytown
- 2016 Michael Mayer & Joe Goddard – For you Solomun Morning Version – K7!
- 2016 Michael Mayer & Joe Goddard – For you Solomun Night Version – K7!
- 2017 Age of Love – The Age of Love (Solomun Renaissance Remix) – Renaissance Records
- 2017 DJ Hell – Anything, Anytime (Solomun Remix) _ International Deejay Gigolo Records
- 2017 Depeche Mode – Going Backwards (Solomun Remix) – Columbia (Sony)
- 2017 Super Flu – mygut (Solomun Remix) – Monaberry
- 2017 Leonard Cohen – You Want It Darker (Solomun Remix) – Sony Music Entertainment
- 2017 Pantha du Prince – Dream Yourself Awake (Solomun Remix) – Plangent Records
- 2018 Made by Pete feat. Jem Cooke – So long (Solomun Remix) – Crosstown Rebels
- 2018 Eagles & Butterflies – The Last Dance (Solomun Remix) – Art Imitating Life
- 2018 Stephan Bodzin & Marc Romboy – Kerberos (Solomun & Johannes Brecht Remix) – Systematic
- 2018 Keinemusik – You Are Safe (Solomun Remix) – Keinemusik
- 2019 Apparat – Outlier (Solomun Remix) – Mute
- 2019 Agoria – You're Not Alone (Solomun Remix) – Sapiens
- 2019 Âme – The Line (Solomun Remixes: Frank's Vote and Kristian's Vote) – Innervisions
- 2019 Jon Hopkins – Emerald Rush (Solomun Remix) – Domino
- 2019 Adriatique – Nude (Solomun Remix) – Afterlife
- 2024 Pet Shop Boys – Dancing star (Solomun Remix) – Parlophone
- 2024 Pet Shop Boys – Dancing star (Solomun Extended Remix) – Parlophone
- 2024 Pet Shop Boys – Dancing star (Solomun Dub) – Parlophone

=== Music ===
- 2016 Stimming – Alpe Lusia (Solomun Remix) – Diynamic Music
- 2016 Moderat – Eating Hooks (Siriusmo Remix, Solomun Edit) – Monkeytown
- 2016 Michael Mayer & Joe Goddard – For you Solomun Morning Version – K7!
- 2016 Michael Mayer & Joe Goddard – For you Solomun Night Version – K7!

== See also ==
- Similar artists from former Yugoslavia: UMEK (SLO) Mike Vale (SLO), Ilija Djokovic (SRB), Rub A Dub (BiH), Flojd Covic (BiH), Zlatinchi (BiH), Sinisa Tamamovic (BiH), Mladen Tomic (BiH), Forniva (BiH), Andrew Meller (SRB).
